= Listed buildings in Medway, non civil parish (Frindsbury, Rochester, Strood) =

Historic structures in Kent, England

Medway is a unitary authority area with borough status in Kent, England. There are both civil parishes and unparished areas within the borough.

The unparished or non-civil parish area contains 35 grade I, 72 grade II* and 416 grade II listed buildings that are recorded in the National Heritage List for England.

This list contains the listed buildings for the town of Rochester including Borstal, the unparished area of Frindsbury and Strood.

This list is based on the information retrieved online from Historic England.

== Key ==
| Grade | Criteria |
|---|---|
| I | Buildings that are of exceptional interest |
| II* | Particularly important buildings of more than special interest |
| II | Buildings that are of special interest |

== Listing ==
=== Rochester ===
| Name | Grade | Location | Type | Completed (Note: The date given is the date used by Historic England as significant for the initial building or that of an important part in the structure's description.) | Date designated | Grid ref. (Note: The grid reference is based on the British national grid reference system, sometimes known as OSGB36, used by the Ordnance Survey.) Geo-coordinates | Notes | Entry number (Note: The "List Entry Number" is a unique number assigned to each listed building and scheduled monument by Historic England.) | Image | Wikidata |
|---|---|---|---|---|---|---|---|---|---|---|
| Rochester City Walls | I | | | | 24 October 1950 | TQ7437268345; 51°23′14″N 0°30′17″E | | 1086506 | Rochester City Walls More images | Q17533243 |
| Rochester Castle | I | | | | 24 October 1950 | TQ7413768560; 51°23′22″N 0°30′05″E | | 1336100 | Rochester Castle More images | Q1125527 |
| Crimean War Memorial at Chatham Garrison Military Cemetery Crimean War Memorial at Fort Pitt | II | | | | 2 December 1991 | TQ7487367115; 51°22′34″N 0°30′40″E | | 1336102 | Upload Photo | Q26620625 |
| King's Head Hotel | II | Boley Hill | | | 24 October 1950 | TQ7427768617; 51°23′23″N 0°30′12″E | | 1299541 | Upload Photo | Q26586935 |
| Boley Hill House | II | Boley Hill | | | 24 October 1950 | TQ7412768433; 51°23′18″N 0°30′04″E | | 1086507 | Upload Photo | Q26377446 |
| Trevine, With Garden Walls to Boley Hill | II | Boley Hill | | | 24 October 1950 | TQ7411068442; 51°23′18″N 0°30′03″E | | 1086508 | Upload Photo | Q26377450 |
| Milton Cottage | II* | Boley Hill | | | 19 February 1970 | TQ7411768478; 51°23′19″N 0°30′04″E | | 1086509 | Upload Photo | Q17551336 |
| Old Hall and Old Vicarage | II* | Boley Hill | | | 24 October 1950 | TQ7411168491; 51°23′20″N 0°30′03″E | | 1086510 | Upload Photo | Q17551341 |
| Pair of Gatepiers 15 Metres North East of Satis House | II | Boley Hill | | | 2 December 1991 | TQ7411068510; 51°23′20″N 0°30′03″E | | 1086511 | Upload Photo | Q26377455 |
| Satis House | II | Boley Hill | | | 24 October 1950 | TQ7408568506; 51°23′20″N 0°30′02″E | | 1086512 | Upload Photo | Q26377461 |
| Longley House | II | Boley Hill | | | 24 October 1950 | TQ7408168519; 51°23′20″N 0°30′02″E | | 1086513 | Upload Photo | Q26377463 |
| Whitefriars | II | Boley Hill | | | 19 February 1970 | TQ7407768534; 51°23′21″N 0°30′02″E | | 1086514 | Upload Photo | Q26377468 |
| The Friars | II | Boley Hill | | | 24 October 1950 | TQ7408468529; 51°23′21″N 0°30′02″E | | 1185213 | Upload Photo | Q26480527 |
| Stretch of Precinct Wall Forming Part of the Diocesan Registry Stretch of Precinct Walling Extending Along East Side of Boley Hill From A Point Immediately South West of the Diocesan Registry (The Precinct QV) to (And Including) The King's School Craft Centre | II | Boley Hill | | | 2 December 1991 | TQ7417468480; 51°23′19″N 0°30′07″E | | 1336101 | Upload Photo | Q66477539 |
| Fort Clarence | II | Borstal Road | | | 19 February 1970 | TQ7390167683; 51°22′54″N 0°29′51″E | | 1299779 | Upload Photo | Q5470926 |
| Cathedral Church of Christ and the Blessed Virgin Mary of Rochester (Formerly Priory of St Andrew Was Included) | I | College Gate | | | 24 October 1950 | TQ7427368521; 51°23′20″N 0°30′12″E | | 1086423 | Cathedral Church of Christ and the Blessed Virgin Mary of Rochester (Formerly Priory of St Andrew Was Included) More images | Q2635720 |
| 1, 2 and 3, College Yard | II | 1, 2 and 3, College Yard | | | 24 October 1950 | TQ7428568589; 51°23′22″N 0°30′13″E | | 1086515 | Upload Photo | Q26377472 |
| Chertsey's Gate | I | College Yard | | | 24 October 1950 | TQ7429368603; 51°23′23″N 0°30′13″E | | 1086494 | Chertsey's Gate More images | Q17533219 |
| Funerary Monument 10 Metres North West of St Nicholas Church | II | College Yard | | | 2 December 1991 | TQ7426168591; 51°23′23″N 0°30′11″E | | 1086516 | Upload Photo | Q26377476 |
| Parish Church of St Nicholas | I | College Yard | | | 24 October 1950 | TQ7428268570; 51°23′22″N 0°30′12″E | | 1299749 | Parish Church of St Nicholas More images | Q17533444 |
| Hayward House | II | 1-8, Corporation Street | | | 2 December 1991 | TQ7438968688; 51°23′26″N 0°30′18″E | | 1336103 | Upload Photo | Q26620626 |
| Medway Adult Education Centre | II | Corporation Street | | | 2 December 1991 | TQ7453568331; 51°23′14″N 0°30′25″E | | 1185301 | Medway Adult Education Centre | Q26480616 |
| 11, Crow Lane | II | 11, Crow Lane | | | 23 August 1974 | TQ7439568275; 51°23′12″N 0°30′18″E | | 1185329 | Upload Photo | Q26480646 |
| No 13 With Garden Walls and Gate Attached | II | 13, Crow Lane | | | 23 August 1974 | TQ7439368265; 51°23′12″N 0°30′18″E | | 1086518 | Upload Photo | Q26377486 |
| 2,4 and 6, Crow Lane | II | 2,4 and 6, Crow Lane | | | 19 February 1970 | TQ7442968342; 51°23′14″N 0°30′20″E | | 1086517 | Upload Photo | Q26377481 |
| The Vines | II* | 21, Crow Lane | | | 24 October 1950 | TQ7435368202; 51°23′10″N 0°30′15″E | | 1185370 | Upload Photo | Q17551361 |
| Vines Croft | II | 23, Crow Lane | | | 24 October 1950 | TQ7434968190; 51°23′10″N 0°30′15″E | | 1336105 | Upload Photo | Q26620628 |
| Remains of Summer House in Garden 25 Metres East of Restoration House | II | Crow Lane | | | 2 December 1991 | TQ7440568210; 51°23′10″N 0°30′18″E | | 1086519 | Upload Photo | Q26377488 |
| Group of Four Bollards at East Entrance to the Vines | II | Crow Lane | | | 23 August 1974 | TQ7434468228; 51°23′11″N 0°30′15″E | | 1185322 | Upload Photo | Q26480641 |
| Restoration House Including Wall and Gatepiers Attached to Front | I | Crow Lane | | | 24 October 1950 | TQ7436368213; 51°23′10″N 0°30′16″E | | 1185341 | Upload Photo | Q7316210 |
| Two Bollards at South East Entrance to the Vines | II | Crow Lane | | | 23 August 1974 | TQ7432268177; 51°23′09″N 0°30′14″E | | 1336104 | Upload Photo | Q26620627 |
| 2, Delce Road | II | 2, Delce Road | | | 2 December 1991 | TQ7460067996; 51°23′03″N 0°30′28″E | | 1185383 | Upload Photo | Q26480700 |
| 127, High Street, 127, Eastgate | II | 127, Eastgate | | | 2 December 1991 | TQ7446668362; 51°23′15″N 0°30′22″E | | 1320012 | 127, High Street, 127, Eastgate | Q26606057 |
| 142, High Street, 142, Eastgate | II | 142, Eastgate | | | 24 October 1950 | TQ7445868331; 51°23′14″N 0°30′21″E | | 1185852 | Upload Photo | Q26481144 |
| Nos 143,143A and 145 Including Ranges to Rear | II | 143A And 145 Including Ranges To Rear, 143, 143A And 145, Eastgate | | | 2 December 1991 | TQ7452068277; 51°23′12″N 0°30′24″E | | 1336145 | Upload Photo | Q26620663 |
| 144, Eastgate, 144, High Street | II | 144, Eastgate | | | 24 October 1950 | TQ7446268323; 51°23′14″N 0°30′21″E | | 1086498 | Upload Photo | Q26377422 |
| 146 and 148, High Street, 146 and 148, Eastgate | II | 146 and 148, Eastgate | | | 24 October 1950 | TQ7446768315; 51°23′13″N 0°30′22″E | | 1185864 | Upload Photo | Q26481156 |
| 147, High Street, 147, Eastgate | II | 147, Eastgate | | | 2 December 1991 | TQ7452868267; 51°23′12″N 0°30′25″E | | 1086444 | Upload Photo | Q26377223 |
| 149, Eastgate, 149, High Street | II | 149, Eastgate | | | 23 August 1974 | TQ7453168262; 51°23′12″N 0°30′25″E | | 1086445 | Upload Photo | Q26377228 |
| 150, 152 and 154, High Street, 150, 152 and 154, Eastgate | I | 150, 152 and 154, Eastgate | | | 24 October 1950 | TQ7447968299; 51°23′13″N 0°30′22″E | | 1086499 | 150, 152 and 154, High Street, 150, 152 and 154, Eastgate More images | Q17533231 |
| 151, Eastgate, 151, High Street | II | 151, Eastgate | | | 19 February 1970 | TQ7453568255; 51°23′11″N 0°30′25″E | | 1336146 | Upload Photo | Q26620664 |
| 153,155 and 157, High Street, 153,155 and 157, Eastgate | II | 153,155 and 157, Eastgate | | | 27 September 1990 | TQ7454068248; 51°23′11″N 0°30′25″E | | 1086446 | Upload Photo | Q26377232 |
| 156, Eastgate, 156, High Street | II* | 156, Eastgate | | | 24 October 1950 | TQ7448668288; 51°23′13″N 0°30′23″E | | 1299474 | 156, Eastgate, 156, High Street More images | Q17551556 |
| 158, 160 and 162, Eastgate, 158, 160 and 162, High Street | II | 158, 160 and 162, Eastgate | | | 23 September 1991 | TQ7449568279; 51°23′12″N 0°30′23″E | | 1336135 | Upload Photo | Q26620654 |
| 163 and 165, Eastgate, 163 and 165, High Street | II | 163 and 165, Eastgate | | | 20 February 1991 | TQ7455968222; 51°23′10″N 0°30′26″E | | 1086447 | Upload Photo | Q26377236 |
| 164, Eastgate, 164, High Street | II | 164, Eastgate | | | 23 August 1974 | TQ7449968270; 51°23′12″N 0°30′23″E | | 1185889 | 164, Eastgate, 164, High Street More images | Q26481180 |
| 166, High Street, 166, Eastgate | II | 166, Eastgate | | | 2 December 1991 | TQ7450268264; 51°23′12″N 0°30′23″E | | 1086500 | Upload Photo | Q26377426 |
| 168, High Street, 168, Eastgate | II* | 168, Eastgate | | | 24 October 1950 | TQ7450668259; 51°23′12″N 0°30′23″E | | 1336136 | 168, High Street, 168, Eastgate More images | Q17551612 |
| 170, Eastgate, 170, High Street | II | 170, Eastgate | | | 3 October 1990 | TQ7451268252; 51°23′11″N 0°30′24″E | | 1186010 | Upload Photo | Q26481283 |
| 171, High Street, 171, Eastgate | II | 171, Eastgate | | | 26 March 1990 | TQ7457368202; 51°23′10″N 0°30′27″E | | 1116130 | Upload Photo | Q26409783 |
| 173, Eastgate, 173, High Street | II | 173, Eastgate | | | 2 December 1991 | TQ7457668199; 51°23′10″N 0°30′27″E | | 1086450 | Upload Photo | Q26377250 |
| 175 and 177, Eastgate, 175 and 177, High Street | II | 175 and 177, Eastgate | | | 2 December 1991 | TQ7458168193; 51°23′09″N 0°30′27″E | | 1116134 | Upload Photo | Q26409787 |
| 2 K6 Telephone Kiosks Outside Head Post Office | II | 2 K6 Telephone Kiosks Outside Head Post Office, Eastgate | | | 1 March 1990 | TQ7455868213; 51°23′10″N 0°30′26″E | | 1086449 | Upload Photo | Q26377246 |
| Railings to North East of Eastgate House | II | Eastgate | | | 2 December 1991 | TQ7450368340; 51°23′14″N 0°30′23″E | | 1086442 | Upload Photo | Q26377216 |
| Pump 10 Metres East of Eastgate House | II | Eastgate | | | 2 December 1991 | TQ7449268319; 51°23′14″N 0°30′23″E | | 1086443 | Upload Photo | Q26377219 |
| Rochester Head Post Office | II | Eastgate | | | 2 December 1991 | TQ7458068224; 51°23′10″N 0°30′27″E | | 1086448 | Upload Photo | Q26377241 |
| Eastgate House | I | Eastgate | | | 24 October 1950 | TQ7447368342; 51°23′14″N 0°30′22″E | | 1086482 | Eastgate House More images | Q16834512 |
| Berkeley House | II* | Eastgate | | | 24 October 1950 | TQ7454468195; 51°23′09″N 0°30′25″E | | 1086501 | Berkeley House More images | Q17551331 |
| Dickens Chalet to Rear of Eastgate House | I | Eastgate | | | 24 October 1950 | TQ7448068345; 51°23′14″N 0°30′22″E | | 1116244 | Upload Photo | Q17533270 |
| Gates and Railings to South of Eastgate House | II | Eastgate | | | 2 December 1991 | TQ7448568318; 51°23′13″N 0°30′23″E | | 1336144 | Upload Photo | Q26620662 |
| Former County Court With Gatepiers Attached | II | High Street | | | 2 December 1991 | TQ7467768150; 51°23′08″N 0°30′32″E | | 1086451 | Upload Photo | Q26377254 |
| Troy House | II | East Row | | | 24 October 1950 | TQ7439068122; 51°23′07″N 0°30′17″E | | 1086520 | Upload Photo | Q26377492 |
| Flint and diapered brick wall at rear of Nos 1 and 3, East Row | II | East Row | | | 23 January 2008 | TQ7437668159; 51°23′08″N 0°30′17″E | | 1392369 | Upload Photo | Q26671591 |
| Salisbury Villa With Attached Wall to Front | II | Epaul Street | | | 19 February 1970 | TQ7424568639; 51°23′24″N 0°30′11″E | | 1299662 | Upload Photo | Q26587037 |
| No 1 Including Railings | II | 1, Esplanade | | | 2 December 1991 | TQ7415968771; 51°23′29″N 0°30′06″E | | 1336106 | Upload Photo | Q26620629 |
| The Castle Club | II | 3, Esplanade | | | 19 February 1970 | TQ7415568756; 51°23′28″N 0°30′06″E | | 1299678 | Upload Photo | Q26587052 |
| Bridge Chambers Bridge Chapel | II | 5, Esplanade | | | 24 October 1950 | TQ7413968748; 51°23′28″N 0°30′05″E | | 1086521 | Upload Photo | Q26377497 |
| Balustrade between Rochester Bridge and Rochester Pier | II | Esplanade | | | 24 October 1950 | TQ7408868693; 51°23′26″N 0°30′03″E | | 1185511 | Upload Photo | Q26480828 |
| Royal Crown Hotel | II | Esplanade | | | 2 December 1991 | TQ7416968778; 51°23′29″N 0°30′07″E | | 1336126 | Royal Crown Hotel More images | Q26620647 |
| Fort Pitt Grammar School For Girls (Domestic Science Block) | II | Fort Pitt Hill | | | 23 August 1974 | TQ7498367665; 51°22′52″N 0°30′47″E | | 1086522 | Upload Photo | Q26377502 |
| Water Pump 10 Metres South West of Crimea House Water Pump 10 Metres South West of Fort Pitt Grammar School For Girls | II | Fort Pitt Hill | | | 2 December 1991 | TQ7509467548; 51°22′48″N 0°30′53″E | | 1185531 | Upload Photo | Q26480848 |
| Crimea House Fort Pitt Grammar School For Girls | II | Fort Pitt Hill | | | 24 October 1950 | TQ7508767580; 51°22′49″N 0°30′52″E | | 1336107 | Upload Photo | Q26620630 |
| Gandulph House | II | Gandulph Square | | | 23 August 1974 | TQ7417668743; 51°23′28″N 0°30′07″E | | 1086483 | Upload Photo | Q26377368 |
| La Providence | II | 1-20, High Street | | | 19 December 1970 | TQ7444468500; 51°23′19″N 0°30′21″E | | 1336124 | Upload Photo | Q89562241 |
| 10, High Street | II | 10, High Street | | | 24 October 1950 | TQ7419468752; 51°23′28″N 0°30′08″E | | 1086484 | Upload Photo | Q26377373 |
| 12 and 14, High Street | II* | 12 and 14, High Street | | | 24 October 1950 | TQ7419768748; 51°23′28″N 0°30′08″E | | 1336127 | Upload Photo | Q17551603 |
| 17 High Street | II | 17, High Street | | | 19 February 1970 | TQ7424468725; 51°23′27″N 0°30′11″E | | 1086470 | Upload Photo | Q26377325 |
| The Rochester Bar | II | 18, High Street | | | 24 October 1950 | TQ7421868720; 51°23′27″N 0°30′09″E | | 1086486 | Upload Photo | Q26377377 |
| 19, High Street | II | 19, High Street | | | 24 October 1950 | TQ7424768719; 51°23′27″N 0°30′11″E | | 1299304 | Upload Photo | Q26586717 |
| 20, High Street | II | 20, High Street | | | 24 October 1950 | TQ7422168715; 51°23′27″N 0°30′10″E | | 1336128 | Upload Photo | Q26620648 |
| 21 and 23, High Street | II | 21 and 23, High Street | | | 24 October 1950 | TQ7425168714; 51°23′27″N 0°30′11″E | | 1086471 | Upload Photo | Q26377330 |
| 22, High Street | II | 22, High Street | | | 23 August 1974 | TQ7422468710; 51°23′26″N 0°30′10″E | | 1086487 | Upload Photo | Q26377380 |
| 24, High Street | II | 24, High Street | | | 23 August 1974 | TQ7422768706; 51°23′26″N 0°30′10″E | | 1336129 | Upload Photo | Q26620649 |
| 26, High Street | II | 26, High Street | | | 23 August 1974 | TQ7422968702; 51°23′26″N 0°30′10″E | | 1086488 | 26, High Street More images | Q26377385 |
| 28, High Street | II | 28, High Street | | | 23 August 1974 | TQ7423168698; 51°23′26″N 0°30′10″E | | 1185620 | 28, High Street More images | Q26480933 |
| 30, High Street | II | 30, High Street | | | 23 August 1974 | TQ7423468692; 51°23′26″N 0°30′10″E | | 1086489 | 30, High Street More images | Q26377388 |
| 32, High Street | II | 32, High Street | | | 23 August 1974 | TQ7423868686; 51°23′26″N 0°30′10″E | | 1185635 | 32, High Street More images | Q26480947 |
| 34 and 36, High Street | II | 34 and 36, High Street | | | 23 August 1974 | TQ7424268679; 51°23′25″N 0°30′11″E | | 1086490 | 34 and 36, High Street More images | Q26377391 |
| George Vaults | II* | 35, High Street | | | 24 October 1950 | TQ7426768684; 51°23′26″N 0°30′12″E | | 1186209 | George Vaults More images | Q17551370 |
| 37, High Street | II | 37, High Street | | | 23 August 1974 | TQ7427068678; 51°23′25″N 0°30′12″E | | 1086472 | Upload Photo | Q26377334 |
| Former Barclays Bank | II | 39, High Street | | | 2 December 1991 | TQ7427568672; 51°23′25″N 0°30′12″E | | 1299323 | Upload Photo | Q26586735 |
| 41 and 43, High Street | II | 41 and 43, High Street | | | 23 August 1974 | TQ7427868664; 51°23′25″N 0°30′12″E | | 1086473 | 41 and 43, High Street | Q26377338 |
| La Providence No 105 With Railings to Frontages | II | 41, High Street | | | 19 February 1970 | TQ7440168460; 51°23′18″N 0°30′18″E | | 1116336 | La Providence No 105 With Railings to Frontages | Q26409962 |
| Cloudesley House, With Walls Attached at Rear | II* | 42, High Street | | | 24 October 1950 | TQ7425568659; 51°23′25″N 0°30′11″E | | 1299563 | Upload Photo | Q17551572 |
| 44, High Street | II | 44, High Street | | | 24 October 1950 | TQ7426068653; 51°23′25″N 0°30′11″E | | 1086492 | 44, High Street | Q26377399 |
| 45, High Street | II | 45, High Street | | | 23 August 1974 | TQ7428468657; 51°23′25″N 0°30′13″E | | 1186239 | Upload Photo | Q26481499 |
| 46, High Street | II | 46, High Street | | | 19 February 1970 | TQ7426268650; 51°23′24″N 0°30′12″E | | 1185672 | 46, High Street | Q26480982 |
| No 48 With Low Range to Rear | II | 48, High Street | | | 23 August 1974 | TQ7425968641; 51°23′24″N 0°30′11″E | | 1086493 | No 48 With Low Range to Rear | Q26377404 |
| 51, High Street | II | 51, High Street | | | 24 October 1950 | TQ7429668637; 51°23′24″N 0°30′13″E | | 1116523 | 51, High Street | Q26410124 |
| 53, High Street | II | 53, High Street | | | 24 October 1950 | TQ7429868630; 51°23′24″N 0°30′13″E | | 1336120 | 53, High Street | Q26620643 |
| 59, 61 and 63, High Street | II | 59, 61 and 63, High Street | | | 2 December 1991 | TQ7431468605; 51°23′23″N 0°30′14″E | | 1116532 | 59, 61 and 63, High Street | Q26410133 |
| No 60 (Including Those Parts at Rear Facing College Green) Rear Part of 60 High Street | II* | 60, High Street | | | 24 October 1950 | TQ7429468596; 51°23′23″N 0°30′13″E | | 1299552 | No 60 (Including Those Parts at Rear Facing College Green) Rear Part of 60 High Street More images | Q17551567 |
| 64, 66 and 68, High Street | II | 64, 66 and 68, High Street | | | 24 October 1950 | TQ7430468582; 51°23′22″N 0°30′14″E | | 1336130 | 64, 66 and 68, High Street | Q26620650 |
| 65 and 65A, High Street | II | 65 and 65A, High Street | | | 23 August 1974 | TQ7431868598; 51°23′23″N 0°30′14″E | | 1086475 | 65 and 65A, High Street | Q26377342 |
| 67 and 67A, High Street | II | 67 and 67A, High Street | | | 24 October 1950 | TQ7432168594; 51°23′23″N 0°30′15″E | | 1336121 | Upload Photo | Q26620644 |
| Lloyds Bank | II | 69 And 71, High Street | | | 24 October 1950 | TQ7432568586; 51°23′22″N 0°30′15″E | | 1116505 | Lloyds Bank | Q26410108 |
| 73, High Street | II | 73, High Street | | | 23 August 1974 | TQ7433168576; 51°23′22″N 0°30′15″E | | 1086476 | Upload Photo | Q26377346 |
| 75, High Street | II | 75, High Street | | | 23 August 1974 | TQ7433468571; 51°23′22″N 0°30′15″E | | 1116492 | 75, High Street | Q26410095 |
| 77, High Street | II | 77, High Street | | | 23 August 1974 | TQ7433668566; 51°23′22″N 0°30′15″E | | 1086477 | 77, High Street | Q26377349 |
| 78 and 80, High Street | II | 78 and 80, High Street | | | 24 October 1950 | TQ7434268513; 51°23′20″N 0°30′15″E | | 1299553 | 78 and 80, High Street | Q26586946 |
| 79, High Street | II | 79, High Street | | | 24 October 1950 | TQ7434068560; 51°23′21″N 0°30′15″E | | 1116471 | 79, High Street | Q26410079 |
| 81, High Street | II | 81, High Street | | | 24 October 1950 | TQ7434368554; 51°23′21″N 0°30′16″E | | 1336122 | 81, High Street | Q26620645 |
| No 82 With no 82A to Rear No 82 With Philip Lodge to Rear | II* | 82 And 82A, High Street | | | 24 October 1950 | TQ7434768503; 51°23′20″N 0°30′16″E | | 1336131 | No 82 With no 82A to Rear No 82 With Philip Lodge to Rear More images | Q17551609 |
| 83, High Street | II* | 83, High Street | | | 24 October 1950 | TQ7434668548; 51°23′21″N 0°30′16″E | | 1116481 | 83, High Street More images | Q17551351 |
| 84, High Street | II | 84, High Street | | | 2 December 1991 | TQ7435068501; 51°23′20″N 0°30′16″E | | 1299524 | Upload Photo | Q26586920 |
| 85 and 87, High Street | II | 85 and 87, High Street | | | 30 June 1978 | TQ7435268537; 51°23′21″N 0°30′16″E | | 1086478 | 85 and 87, High Street | Q26377354 |
| 86, High Street | II | 86, High Street | | | 24 October 1950 | TQ7435368494; 51°23′19″N 0°30′16″E | | 1336132 | 86, High Street | Q26620651 |
| 88, High Street | II | 88, High Street | | | 24 February 1971 | TQ7435768490; 51°23′19″N 0°30′16″E | | 1185744 | 88, High Street | Q26481043 |
| 89, High Street | II | 89, High Street | | | 30 June 1978 | TQ7435568531; 51°23′21″N 0°30′16″E | | 1116456 | 89, High Street | Q26410064 |
| Gordon Hotel | II* | 91, High Street | | | 24 October 1950 | TQ7436368524; 51°23′20″N 0°30′17″E | | 1336123 | Gordon Hotel More images | Q17551594 |
| 93, High Street | II | 93, High Street | | | 24 October 1950 | TQ7436768516; 51°23′20″N 0°30′17″E | | 1116429 | Upload Photo | Q26410043 |
| Poor Travellers House Richard Watts Charity | I | 97, High Street | | | 24 October 1950 | TQ7437668495; 51°23′19″N 0°30′17″E | | 1086479 | Poor Travellers House Richard Watts Charity | Q17533198 |
| 98, High Street | II | 98, High Street | | | 24 October 1950 | TQ7437568455; 51°23′18″N 0°30′17″E | | 1086496 | Upload Photo | Q26377413 |
| 99 and 101, High Street | II | 99 and 101, High Street | | | 24 October 1950 | TQ7438368487; 51°23′19″N 0°30′18″E | | 1086480 | 99 and 101, High Street | Q26377358 |
| Nos 100 and 102, Including Stretch of Walling to Rear of No 102 | II | 102, 100 And 102, High Street | | | 2 December 1991 | TQ7437968448; 51°23′18″N 0°30′17″E | | 1299531 | Upload Photo | Q26586925 |
| 103, High Street | II | 103, High Street | | | 19 February 1970 | TQ7438968475; 51°23′19″N 0°30′18″E | | 1116344 | 103, High Street More images | Q26409969 |
| 104, High Street | II | 104, High Street | | | 2 December 1991 | TQ7438368440; 51°23′18″N 0°30′17″E | | 1336133 | 104, High Street | Q26620652 |
| 106, High Street | II | 106, High Street | | | 2 December 1991 | TQ7438768434; 51°23′17″N 0°30′18″E | | 1185773 | 106, High Street | Q26481072 |
| 107 and 109, High Street | II | 107 and 109, High Street | | | 24 October 1950 | TQ7440668448; 51°23′18″N 0°30′19″E | | 1086481 | 107 and 109, High Street | Q26377364 |
| 111 and 113, High Street | II | 111 and 113, High Street | | | 23 August 1974 | TQ7441268438; 51°23′17″N 0°30′19″E | | 1320020 | 111 and 113, High Street | Q26606064 |
| 115, High Street | II | 115, High Street | | | 24 October 1950 | TQ7441868431; 51°23′17″N 0°30′19″E | | 1336125 | 115, High Street | Q26620646 |
| The Eagle Tavern | II | 124, High Street | | | 23 August 1974 | TQ7442768386; 51°23′16″N 0°30′20″E | | 1086497 | The Eagle Tavern | Q26377418 |
| 126, High Street | II | 126, High Street | | | 23 August 1974 | TQ7443468377; 51°23′15″N 0°30′20″E | | 1185838 | 126, High Street | Q26481132 |
| 130, High Street | II | 130, High Street | | | 23 August 1974 | TQ7443768366; 51°23′15″N 0°30′20″E | | 1336134 | 130, High Street | Q26620653 |
| The North Foreland Public House | II | 325, High Street | | | 18 February 2011 | TQ7505867945; 51°23′01″N 0°30′51″E | | 1396469 | Upload Photo | Q26675255 |
| 329, 331, 333 and 335, High Street | II | 329, 331, 333 and 335, High Street | | | 2 December 1991 | TQ7508267937; 51°23′01″N 0°30′53″E | | 1336147 | Upload Photo | Q26620665 |
| 343 and 345, High Street | II | 343 and 345, High Street | | | 23 August 1974 | TQ7511267933; 51°23′00″N 0°30′54″E | | 1116104 | Upload Photo | Q26409760 |
| The Ship Inn | II | 347 And 349, High Street | | | 23 August 1974 | TQ7513267929; 51°23′00″N 0°30′55″E | | 1086452 | Upload Photo | Q26377259 |
| 351, High Street | II* | 351, High Street | | | 2 December 1991 | TQ7514367929; 51°23′00″N 0°30′56″E | | 1320136 | Upload Photo | Q17551576 |
| 359 and 361, High Street | II | 359 and 361, High Street | | | 2 December 1991 | TQ7519067920; 51°23′00″N 0°30′58″E | | 1086453 | Upload Photo | Q26377263 |
| 365, High Street | II | 365, High Street | | | 23 August 1974 | TQ7520967919; 51°23′00″N 0°30′59″E | | 1116062 | Upload Photo | Q26409720 |
| 367, 369 and 371, High Street | II | 367, 369 and 371, High Street | | | 23 August 1974 | TQ7522467919; 51°23′00″N 0°31′00″E | | 1336148 | Upload Photo | Q26620666 |
| Retaining Walls, Piers, Railings and Steps Between Nos 368 and 374 and Opposite No 351 | II | 368 And 374 And Opposite No 351, High Street | | | 2 December 1991 | TQ7514267911; 51°23′00″N 0°30′56″E | | 1299352 | Upload Photo | Q26586762 |
| 373, 375 and 377, High Street | II | 373, 375 and 377, High Street | | | 2 December 1991 | TQ7523667919; 51°23′00″N 0°31′01″E | | 1086454 | Upload Photo | Q26377267 |
| Chatham Memorial Synagogue | II* | High Street | | | 2 December 1985 | TQ7511367905; 51°22′59″N 0°30′54″E | | 1086467 | Upload Photo | Q17551323 |
| Halpern Conservancy Board Building | II | High Street | | | 2 December 1991 | TQ7422468752; 51°23′28″N 0°30′10″E | | 1086468 | Halpern Conservancy Board Building More images | Q26377317 |
| K6 Telephone Kiosk Outside the Guildhall | II | High Street | | | 10 September 1987 | TQ7422468740; 51°23′27″N 0°30′10″E | | 1086469 | Upload Photo | Q26377321 |
| Royal Victoria and Bull Hotel | II* | High Street | | | 24 October 1950 | TQ7420968731; 51°23′27″N 0°30′09″E | | 1086485 | Royal Victoria and Bull Hotel More images | Q17551327 |
| Former National Westminster Bank | II | High Street | | | 2 December 1991 | TQ7425068665; 51°23′25″N 0°30′11″E | | 1086491 | Former National Westminster Bank | Q26377396 |
| Grafton House | II | High Street | | | 24 October 1950 | TQ7436568476; 51°23′19″N 0°30′17″E | | 1086495 | Grafton House | Q26377409 |
| House at Rear of No 321 High Street | II | High Street | | | 29 March 1989 | TQ7504067970; 51°23′02″N 0°30′51″E | | 1116093 | Upload Photo | Q26409750 |
| The Guildhall Including Ranges Running Parallel to Bull Lane | I | High Street | | | 24 October 1950 | TQ7424068741; 51°23′27″N 0°30′11″E | | 1186145 | Upload Photo | Q15272878 |
| Rochester War Memorial | II | High Street | | | 16 May 2017 | TQ7432668526; 51°23′20″N 0°30′15″E | | 1445817 | Upload Photo | Q66478735 |
| The Cottage | II | High Street | | | 26 September 2022 | TQ7511867957; 51°23′01″N 0°30′55″E | | 1479148 | Upload Photo | Q126196951 |
| Cottage to Rear of No 374 High Street | II | Hospital Lane | | | 2 December 1991 | TQ7515067895; 51°22′59″N 0°30′56″E | | 1116041 | Upload Photo | Q26409699 |
| Mortuary of St Bartholemew's Hospital | II | Hospital Lane | | | 2 December 1991 | TQ7513667865; 51°22′58″N 0°30′55″E | | 1336149 | Upload Photo | Q26620667 |
| Hulkes Lane Brewery Buildings | II | Hulkes Lane | | | 14 September 2022 | TQ7514567964; 51°23′01″N 0°30′56″E | | 1481112 | Upload Photo | Q122213852 |
| Morden Terrace | II | 157-173, Maidstone Road | | | 2 December 1991 | TQ7423767803; 51°22′57″N 0°30′09″E | | 1336150 | Upload Photo | Q26620668 |
| 37, Maidstone Road | II | 37, Maidstone Road | | | 2 December 1991 | TQ7434168126; 51°23′07″N 0°30′15″E | | 1086455 | Upload Photo | Q26377272 |
| 55 and 57, Maidstone Road | II | 55 and 57, Maidstone Road | | | 23 August 1974 | TQ7432868083; 51°23′06″N 0°30′14″E | | 1115769 | Upload Photo | Q26409459 |
| 61 and 63, Maidstone Road | II | 61 and 63, Maidstone Road | | | 23 August 1974 | TQ7432568069; 51°23′06″N 0°30′14″E | | 1086456 | Upload Photo | Q26377275 |
| 65 and 67, Maidstone Road | II | 65 and 67, Maidstone Road | | | 23 August 1974 | TQ7432268061; 51°23′05″N 0°30′14″E | | 1115775 | Upload Photo | Q26409465 |
| Watts' Almshouses | II | Maidstone Road | | | 19 February 1970 | TQ7418367781; 51°22′56″N 0°30′06″E | | 1086457 | Upload Photo | Q26377279 |
| St Margaret's Cemetery Chapels | II | Maidstone Road | | | 2 December 1991 | TQ7421167217; 51°22′38″N 0°30′06″E | | 1115753 | Upload Photo | Q26409445 |
| Linden House | II | 2, Nag's Head Lane | | | 19 February 1970 | TQ7479867960; 51°23′02″N 0°30′38″E | | 1115731 | Upload Photo | Q26409426 |
| Nashenden Farmhouse With Briar Cottage Attached | II | Nashenden Lane | | | 2 December 1991 | TQ7316665966; 51°21′59″N 0°29′10″E | | 1336151 | Upload Photo | Q26620669 |
| 13,14,15 and 16, New Road | II | 13,14,15 and 16, New Road | | | 24 October 1950 | TQ7479667897; 51°23′00″N 0°30′38″E | | 1115724 | Upload Photo | Q26409420 |
| 18,19,20,21,22 and 23, New Road | II | 18,19,20,21,22 and 23, New Road | | | 24 October 1950 | TQ7482767880; 51°22′59″N 0°30′39″E | | 1336152 | Upload Photo | Q26620670 |
| 24,25 and 26, New Road | II | 24,25 and 26, New Road | | | 2 December 1991 | TQ7485367872; 51°22′59″N 0°30′41″E | | 1320281 | Upload Photo | Q26606297 |
| 29,30 and 31, New Road | II | 29,30 and 31, New Road | | | 23 August 1974 | TQ7487967863; 51°22′58″N 0°30′42″E | | 1086460 | Upload Photo | Q26377292 |
| The Good Companions Club Including Wall to Left Part of Frontage | II | 3, New Road | | | 24 October 1950 | TQ7469467923; 51°23′00″N 0°30′33″E | | 1115706 | Upload Photo | Q26409404 |
| The Dickens Hotel | II | 5,6 And 7, New Road | | | 2 December 1991 | TQ7473867914; 51°23′00″N 0°30′35″E | | 1086458 | Upload Photo | Q26377283 |
| 9,10 and 11, New Road | II | 9,10 and 11, New Road | | | 2 December 1991 | TQ7475967905; 51°23′00″N 0°30′36″E | | 1086459 | Upload Photo | Q26377288 |
| Public Library (Former Corn Exchange) to Rear of High Street, the Corn Exchange the Corn Exchange | I | Northgate | | | 23 August 1974 | TQ7432168655; 51°23′25″N 0°30′15″E | | 1086474 | Upload Photo | Q17533186 |
| Rochester Quaker Meeting House | II | Northgate | | | 24 October 1950 | TQ7436968634; 51°23′24″N 0°30′17″E | | 1115680 | Upload Photo | Q26409378 |
| Ivy House | II | Pleasant Row | | | 24 October 1950 | TQ7436568126; 51°23′07″N 0°30′16″E | | 1336153 | Upload Photo | Q26620671 |
| Foord Almshouses Nos 1-47 With Gate and Forecourt Walls Attached | II* | 1-47, Priestfields | | | 24 October 1950 | TQ7371567162; 51°22′37″N 0°29′41″E | | 1329912 | Upload Photo | Q17551590 |
| Nos 1-47, Cupola in Centre Court, Foord Almshouses Nos 48-64, 1-47 | II* | 48-64, 1-47, Priestfields | | | 24 October 1950 | TQ7371267122; 51°22′36″N 0°29′40″E | | 1086430 | Upload Photo | Q17551305 |
| Foord Almshouses | II* | 48-64, Priestfields | | | 24 October 1950 | TQ7372067220; 51°22′39″N 0°29′41″E | | 1329712 | Upload Photo | Q17551584 |
| Pair of gatepiers and gates between College Yard and Cathedral Cemetery | II | College Yard, Rochester | | | 2 December 1991 | TQ7425768570; 51°23′22″N 0°30′11″E | | 1299727 | Upload Photo | Q26587097 |
| St Ronans | II | King Edward Road, Rochester | | | 2 December 1991 | TQ7410268165; 51°23′09″N 0°30′02″E | | 1115794 | Upload Photo | Q26409483 |
| Rochester Bridge | II | Rochester Bridge | | | 2 December 1991 | TQ7405568903; 51°23′33″N 0°30′01″E | | 1086431 | Upload Photo | Q13528098 |
| Old St Margaret's the King's School | II* | St Margaret's Street | | | 24 October 1950 | TQ7410968300; 51°23′13″N 0°30′03″E | | 1086435 | Old St Margaret's the King's School More images | Q17551313 |
| Forecourt Wall to Old St Margaret's Forecourt Wall to the King's School | II | St Margaret's Street | | | 2 December 1991 | TQ7411968295; 51°23′13″N 0°30′04″E | | 1145869 | Upload Photo | Q26439022 |
| 246, St Margaret's Banks, 246, High Street | II | 246, High Street | | | 23 August 1974 | TQ7470768088; 51°23′06″N 0°30′34″E | | 1186026 | Upload Photo | Q26481298 |
| 250, High Street, 250, St Margaret's Banks | II | 250, High Street | | | 2 December 1991 | TQ7471668072; 51°23′05″N 0°30′34″E | | 1086502 | Upload Photo | Q26377430 |
| 252 St Margaret's Banks and East Rear Garden Wall | II | 252 St. Margarets Banks, High Street | | | 24 October 1950 | TQ7472568065; 51°23′05″N 0°30′34″E | | 1186038 | Upload Photo | Q26481310 |
| 254 St Margaret's Banks | II | 254 St. Margarets Banks, High Street | | | 24 October 1950 | TQ7473768061; 51°23′05″N 0°30′35″E | | 1336098 | Upload Photo | Q26620622 |
| Anchor House | II | 276, High Street | | | 24 October 1950 | TQ7480268022; 51°23′04″N 0°30′38″E | | 1086462 | Upload Photo | Q26377296 |
| 286, St. Margarets Banks | II | 286, St. Margarets Banks, High Street | | | 2 December 1991 | TQ7482968003; 51°23′03″N 0°30′40″E | | 1336154 | Upload Photo | Q26620672 |
| The Nag's Head | II | 292, High Street | | | 19 February 1970 | TQ7484967988; 51°23′02″N 0°30′41″E | | 1086463 | Upload Photo | Q26377301 |
| 294, St Margaret's Banks, 294, High Street | II | 294, High Street | | | 19 February 1970 | TQ7485567988; 51°23′02″N 0°30′41″E | | 1336155 | Upload Photo | Q26620673 |
| 296 and 298, St Margaret's Banks, 296 and 298, High Street | II | 296 and 298, High Street | | | 20 March 1972 | TQ7486567982; 51°23′02″N 0°30′42″E | | 1086464 | Upload Photo | Q26377304 |
| 300, 300A and 302, St Margaret's Banks, 300, 300A and 302, High Street | II | 300, 300A and 302, High Street | | | 24 October 1950 | TQ7487467975; 51°23′02″N 0°30′42″E | | 1086465 | Upload Photo | Q26377308 |
| 304 and 306, High Street, 304 and 306, St Margaret's Banks | II | 304 and 306, High Street | | | 20 March 1972 | TQ7488567971; 51°23′02″N 0°30′43″E | | 1336118 | Upload Photo | Q26620641 |
| 308, High Street, 308, St Margaret's Banks | II | 308, High Street | | | 24 October 1950 | TQ7489367965; 51°23′02″N 0°30′43″E | | 1086466 | Upload Photo | Q26377313 |
| 310 and 312, St Margaret's Banks, 310 and 312, High Street | II | 310 and 312, High Street | | | 20 March 1972 | TQ7490167961; 51°23′01″N 0°30′43″E | | 1336119 | Upload Photo | Q26620642 |
| The Coopers Arms | II | 10, St Margaret's Street | | | 24 October 1950 | TQ7415368396; 51°23′16″N 0°30′05″E | | 1145838 | Upload Photo | Q26438983 |
| 12,14,16,18 and 20, St Margaret's Street | II | 12,14,16,18 and 20, St Margaret's Street | | | 24 October 1950 | TQ7414868377; 51°23′16″N 0°30′05″E | | 1336138 | Upload Photo | Q26620656 |
| The Gleanings the Old Coach House | II | 2,3 And 4, St Margaret's Street | | | 2 December 1991 | TQ7404368113; 51°23′07″N 0°29′59″E | | 1325993 | The Gleanings the Old Coach House More images | Q26611503 |
| 22, St Margaret's Street | II | 22, St Margaret's Street | | | 24 October 1950 | TQ7414668360; 51°23′15″N 0°30′05″E | | 1318923 | Upload Photo | Q26605031 |
| 23 and 25, St Margaret's Street | II | 23 and 25, St Margaret's Street | | | 23 August 1974 | TQ7409368209; 51°23′10″N 0°30′02″E | | 1336137 | Upload Photo | Q26620655 |
| Bishop's Court With Bishop's Court Flat and Rear Flat Attached | II* | 24, St Margaret's Street | | | 24 October 1950 | TQ7412368338; 51°23′15″N 0°30′04″E | | 1086434 | Bishop's Court With Bishop's Court Flat and Rear Flat Attached More images | Q17551310 |
| 26, St Margaret's Street | II | 26, St Margaret's Street | | | 23 June 1974 | TQ7410768286; 51°23′13″N 0°30′03″E | | 1336139 | Upload Photo | Q26620657 |
| No 30, Including Railings to Basement Area at Front | II | 30, St Margaret's Street | | | 24 October 1950 | TQ7409668261; 51°23′12″N 0°30′02″E | | 1086436 | Upload Photo | Q26377193 |
| 32, St Margaret's Street | II | 32, St Margaret's Street | | | 19 February 1970 | TQ7408268255; 51°23′12″N 0°30′02″E | | 1336140 | Upload Photo | Q26620658 |
| 34, St Margaret's Street | II | 34, St Margaret's Street | | | 19 February 1970 | TQ7409368247; 51°23′12″N 0°30′02″E | | 1318874 | Upload Photo | Q26604988 |
| 36 and 38, St Margaret's Street | II | 36 and 38, St Margaret's Street | | | 23 August 1974 | TQ7409068242; 51°23′11″N 0°30′02″E | | 1086437 | Upload Photo | Q26377198 |
| Wellesley House | II | 40, St Margaret's Street | | | 2 December 1991 | TQ7408868236; 51°23′11″N 0°30′02″E | | 1145925 | Upload Photo | Q26439075 |
| Candlemas House | II | 42 And 42A, St Margaret's Street | | | 23 August 1974 | TQ7408468229; 51°23′11″N 0°30′02″E | | 1086438 | Upload Photo | Q26377202 |
| 48A and 48B, St Margaret's Street | II | 48A and 48B, St Margaret's Street | | | 23 August 1974 | TQ7407768215; 51°23′11″N 0°30′01″E | | 1145926 | Upload Photo | Q26439077 |
| No 50 With Front Garden Walls and Gatepiers Attached | II | 50, St Margaret's Street | | | 24 October 1950 | TQ7406568208; 51°23′10″N 0°30′01″E | | 1105678 | Upload Photo | Q26399612 |
| The Limes and Garden Wall to North Attached | II* | 52, St Margaret's Street | | | 24 October 1950 | TQ7406768182; 51°23′10″N 0°30′01″E | | 1086439 | Upload Photo | Q17551318 |
| Grayling House | II | 54, St Margaret's Street | | | 24 October 1950 | TQ7406568173; 51°23′09″N 0°30′01″E | | 1326282 | Upload Photo | Q26611775 |
| Wingham Lodge | II | 56, St Margaret's Street | | | 24 October 1950 | TQ7405668164; 51°23′09″N 0°30′00″E | | 1086440 | Upload Photo | Q26377206 |
| The Gleanings With Railings to Rear West | II* | 58, St Margaret's Street | | | 19 February 1970 | TQ7402968134; 51°23′08″N 0°29′59″E | | 1326284 | Upload Photo | Q17551579 |
| Mill House | II | 59, St Margaret's Street | | | 10 December 1987 | TQ7399167932; 51°23′02″N 0°29′56″E | | 1318919 | Upload Photo | Q26605027 |
| Thorndikes and Former Stable and Coach House Adjoining | II | 60, St Margaret's Street | | | 19 February 1970 | TQ7404368100; 51°23′07″N 0°29′59″E | | 1086441 | Upload Photo | Q26377211 |
| 85, St Margaret's Street | II | 85, St Margaret's Street | | | 11 May 1982 | TQ7389767735; 51°22′55″N 0°29′51″E | | 1086433 | Upload Photo | Q26377190 |
| Parish Church of St Margaret of Antioch | II* | St Margaret's Street | | | 24 October 1950 | TQ7402268064; 51°23′06″N 0°29′58″E | | 1086400 | Upload Photo | Q7589859 |
| Tomb Chest 15 Metres North West of St Margaret's Church | II | St Margaret's Street | | | 2 December 1991 | TQ7401568086; 51°23′07″N 0°29′58″E | | 1086401 | Upload Photo | Q26377079 |
| Tomb Chest North of Nave of St Margaret's Church | II | St Margaret's Street | | | 2 December 1991 | TQ7403068079; 51°23′06″N 0°29′59″E | | 1086402 | Upload Photo | Q26377083 |
| Group of Four Tomb Chests Immediately East of St Margaret's Church | II | St Margaret's Street | | | 2 December 1991 | TQ7403868068; 51°23′06″N 0°29′59″E | | 1086403 | Upload Photo | Q26377088 |
| Walls Enclosing Archdeaconry Gardens | II | St Margaret's Street | | | 2 December 1991 | TQ7415668359; 51°23′15″N 0°30′06″E | | 1086432 | Upload Photo | Q26377185 |
| St Margaret's House and Building Adjacent to North East | II | St Margaret's Street | | | 24 October 1950 | TQ7412368270; 51°23′12″N 0°30′04″E | | 1145825 | Upload Photo | Q26438967 |
| Gazebo at Foot of Garden to Rear of No 30 | II | St Margaret's Street | | | 2 December 1991 | TQ7405468276; 51°23′13″N 0°30′00″E | | 1145880 | Upload Photo | Q26439035 |
| Wall to South Entrance and South West Garden of Bishop's Court Wall to South Entrance and South West Garden of No 24 | II | St Margaret's Street | | | 2 December 1991 | TQ7412568313; 51°23′14″N 0°30′04″E | | 1318896 | Upload Photo | Q26605006 |
| Building to Rear of Nos 48A and 48B | II | St Margaret's Street | | | 23 August 1974 | TQ7406568219; 51°23′11″N 0°30′01″E | | 1336141 | Upload Photo | Q26620659 |
| Gazebo at Foot of Garden to Rear of No 52 Gazebo at Foot of Garden to Rear of the Limes | II | St Margaret's Street | | | 2 December 1991 | TQ7403268211; 51°23′11″N 0°29′59″E | | 1336142 | Upload Photo | Q26620660 |
| Wall Extending 15 Metres North East From the Front Entrance to No 58 | II | St Margaret's Street | | | 2 December 1991 | TQ7406668147; 51°23′08″N 0°30′01″E | | 1336143 | Upload Photo | Q26620661 |
| Wall With Gates Enclosing Churchyard of St Margaret's Parish Church With Headstones Attached | II | St Margaret's Street | | | 2 December 1991 | TQ7402268033; 51°23′05″N 0°29′58″E | | 1336163 | Upload Photo | Q26620681 |
| Two Tomb Chests 8 Metres North of Nave of St Margaret's Church | II | St Margaret's Street | | | 2 December 1991 | TQ7402568079; 51°23′06″N 0°29′58″E | | 1336164 | Upload Photo | Q26620682 |
| 10, Star Hill | II | 10, Star Hill | | | 23 August 1974 | TQ7457668129; 51°23′07″N 0°30′27″E | | 1086404 | Upload Photo | Q26377092 |
| Medway Conservative Constituency Association Headquarters and Club | II | 12, Star Hill | | | 23 August 1974 | TQ7457568110; 51°23′07″N 0°30′27″E | | 1086405 | Upload Photo | Q32828719 |
| 14, Star Hill | II | 14, Star Hill | | | 24 October 1950 | TQ7458368104; 51°23′06″N 0°30′27″E | | 1086406 | Upload Photo | Q26377100 |
| 16, Star Hill | II | 16, Star Hill | | | 24 October 1950 | TQ7458468099; 51°23′06″N 0°30′27″E | | 1086407 | Upload Photo | Q26377104 |
| 17-39, Star Hill | II | 17-39, Star Hill | | | 24 October 1950 | TQ7464567997; 51°23′03″N 0°30′30″E | | 1106294 | Upload Photo | Q26400171 |
| 20, Star Hill | II | 20, Star Hill | | | 2 December 1991 | TQ7458768075; 51°23′06″N 0°30′27″E | | 1106338 | Upload Photo | Q26400208 |
| Star Hill House With Railings to Front | II* | 22, Star Hill | | | 24 October 1950 | TQ7459168061; 51°23′05″N 0°30′28″E | | 1086408 | Upload Photo | Q17551296 |
| 24A, 24B and 24C, Star Hill | II | 24A, 24B and 24C, Star Hill | | | 24 October 1950 | TQ7459368044; 51°23′05″N 0°30′28″E | | 1086409 | Upload Photo | Q26377108 |
| 26,28,30 and 32, Star Hill | II | 26,28,30 and 32, Star Hill | | | 19 February 1970 | TQ7459668025; 51°23′04″N 0°30′28″E | | 1106318 | Upload Photo | Q26400192 |
| 34, Star Hill | II | 34, Star Hill | | | 1 December 1991 | TQ7459868012; 51°23′03″N 0°30′28″E | | 1336165 | Upload Photo | Q26620683 |
| St Catherine's Hospital With Wall and Railings to Front | II | Star Hill | | | 23 August 1974 | TQ7463567922; 51°23′01″N 0°30′30″E | | 1086410 | Upload Photo | Q26377113 |
| Star Hill Elim Pentecostal Church | II | Star Hill | | | 2 December 1991 | TQ7459768004; 51°23′03″N 0°30′28″E | | 1106325 | Upload Photo | Q26400197 |
| Minor Canons' Row | I | 1-7, The Precinct | | | 24 October 1950 | TQ7423568444; 51°23′18″N 0°30′10″E | | 1139023 | Upload Photo | Q17533281 |
| Kings School and Cathedral Visitors Centre | I | The Precinct | | | 24 October 1950 | TQ7431168461; 51°23′18″N 0°30′14″E | | 1086421 | Upload Photo | Q17533155 |
| Cloister House | II | The Precinct | | | 24 October 1950 | TQ7426568448; 51°23′18″N 0°30′11″E | | 1086422 | Upload Photo | Q26377161 |
| King's School With Walls Attached Maclean House With Walls Attached | II | The Precinct | | | 2 December 1991 | TQ7427168404; 51°23′17″N 0°30′12″E | | 1086424 | Upload Photo | Q26377165 |
| Oriel House With Forecourt and Garden Walls Attached | II | The Precinct | | | 24 October 1974 | TQ7423668345; 51°23′15″N 0°30′10″E | | 1086425 | Upload Photo | Q26377170 |
| Diocesan Registry Including Part of Precinct Wall to Boley Hill | II | The Precinct | | | 24 October 1950 | TQ7420668529; 51°23′21″N 0°30′08″E | | 1086426 | Upload Photo | Q26377176 |
| College Green and Southgate and Garden Wall to Front | II* | The Precinct | | | 24 October 1950 | TQ7420168496; 51°23′20″N 0°30′08″E | | 1086427 | Upload Photo | Q17551301 |
| Priors Gate | I | The Precinct | | | 24 October 1950 | TQ7420468450; 51°23′18″N 0°30′08″E | | 1086428 | Upload Photo | Q17533163 |
| The Archdeaconry | II | The Precinct | | | 24 October 1950 | TQ7420268351; 51°23′15″N 0°30′08″E | | 1086429 | Upload Photo | Q26377180 |
| Cathedral Cloister Buildings | I | The Precinct | | | 24 October 1950 | TQ7425768489; 51°23′19″N 0°30′11″E | | 1086461 | Upload Photo | Q17533173 |
| Deanery Gate and Gatehouse | I | The Precinct | | | 24 October 1950 | TQ7429268544; 51°23′21″N 0°30′13″E | | 1115637 | Deanery Gate and Gatehouse More images | Q17533256 |
| Cloister Gate | I | The Precinct | | | 2 December 1991 | TQ7423968480; 51°23′19″N 0°30′10″E | | 1320354 | Upload Photo | Q17533456 |
| Prior's Gate House With Garden Wall | II | The Precinct | | | 24 October 1950 | TQ7421468481; 51°23′19″N 0°30′09″E | | 1329929 | Upload Photo | Q26615110 |
| Garth House | II | The Precinct | | | 2 December 1991 | TQ7425368456; 51°23′18″N 0°30′11″E | | 1336173 | Upload Photo | Q26620691 |
| Section of Roman Wall 20 Metres South of Former Deanery Section of Roman Wall 20 Metres South of Kings School Sixth Form Centre | I | The Precinct | | | 19 February 1970 | TQ7430468430; 51°23′17″N 0°30′13″E | | 1336174 | Upload Photo | Q17533470 |
| Former Stable 15 Metres North of Oriel House | II | The Precinct | | | 23 August 1974 | TQ7423868370; 51°23′15″N 0°30′10″E | | 1336175 | Upload Photo | Q26620692 |
| 1-6, The Terrace, Victoria Street | II | 1-6, The Terrace | | | 20 February 1991 | TQ7447268138; 51°23′08″N 0°30′22″E | | 1086411 | Upload Photo | Q26377118 |
| 7-16, The Terrace, Victoria Street | II | 7-16, The Terrace | | | 20 February 1991 | TQ7444068159; 51°23′08″N 0°30′20″E | | 1106285 | Upload Photo | Q26400162 |
| 2,4 and 6, Union Street | II | 2,4 and 6, Union Street | | | 24 October 1950 | TQ7439168108; 51°23′07″N 0°30′17″E | | 1336166 | Upload Photo | Q26620684 |
| 11,13,15 and 17, Victoria Street | II | 11,13,15 and 17, Victoria Street | | | 2 December 1991 | TQ7452868099; 51°23′06″N 0°30′24″E | | 1107210 | Upload Photo | Q26401022 |
| Victoria House | II | 19, Victoria Street | | | 24 October 1950 | TQ7451668092; 51°23′06″N 0°30′24″E | | 1086412 | Upload Photo | Q26377121 |
| 21, Victoria Street | II | 21, Victoria Street | | | 24 October 1950 | TQ7450668088; 51°23′06″N 0°30′23″E | | 1336167 | Upload Photo | Q26620685 |
| 23, Victoria Street | II | 23, Victoria Street | | | 2 December 1991 | TQ7450268083; 51°23′06″N 0°30′23″E | | 1107185 | Upload Photo | Q26400996 |
| 25, Victoria Street | II | 25, Victoria Street | | | 23 August 1974 | TQ7449668079; 51°23′06″N 0°30′23″E | | 1086413 | Upload Photo | Q26377126 |
| Ring's Hill Farmhouse | II | Wouldham Road | | | 23 August 1974 | TQ7172165895; 51°21′58″N 0°27′55″E | | 1086414 | Upload Photo | Q26377131 |
| Barn 10 Metres South West of King's Hill Farmhouse | II | Wouldham Road | | | 2 December 1991 | TQ7170165888; 51°21′58″N 0°27′54″E | | 1107905 | Upload Photo | Q26401693 |

=== Frindsbury ===
| Name | Grade | Location | Type | Completed | Date designated | Grid ref. Geo-coordinates | Notes | Entry number | Image | Wikidata |
|---|---|---|---|---|---|---|---|---|---|---|
| The Boghurst Tomb | II | Church Green, 2 Metres South of South Aisle of All Saints Church | | | 2 December 1991 | TQ7440869787; 51°24′01″N 0°30′21″E | Chest tomb 1750. Inscriptions, urn balusters, railed. | 1086415 | The Boghurst Tomb | Q26377134 |
| Moulding Tomb | II | Church Green, 20 Metres East of All Saints Church | | | 2 December 1991 | TQ7444669787; 51°24′01″N 0°30′23″E | Chest tomb, 1789. Inscriptions and urn balusters. | 1107873 | Moulding Tomb | Q26401663 |
| Parish Church of All Saints | II* | Church Green | | | 24 October 1950 | TQ7441269801; 51°24′02″N 0°30′21″E | Norman and later parish church. | 1107886 | Parish Church of All Saints More images | Q4729467 |
| Group of 12 Headstones | II | Church Green, South of South Aisle of All Saints Church | | | 2 December 1991 | TQ7440169790; 51°24′01″N 0°30′21″E | | 1325194 | Upload Photo | Q26610774 |
| Miller Monument | II | Church Green, 15 Metres South of All Saints Church | | | 2 December 1991 | TQ7440069777; 51°24′01″N 0°30′21″E | | 1336169 | Miller Monument | Q26620687 |
| Roman Catholic Church of the English Martyrs | II | Frindsbury Road | | | 27 January 2015 | TQ7394969841; 51°24′03″N 0°29′57″E | Modern (1963-4) fan-shaped church. The design reflects the Second Vatican Council reforms. Brick, concrete and a notable copper covered timber roof. | 1422504 | Roman Catholic Church of the English Martyrs | Q26676954 |
| 80, Frindsbury Road | II | 80, Frindsbury Road | | | 23 August 1974 | TQ7402369858; 51°24′04″N 0°30′01″E | Late 18C brick house. | 1323746 | 80, Frindsbury Road | Q26609446 |
| 82 and 82A, Frindsbury Road | II | 82 and 82A, Frindsbury Road | | | 23 August 1974 | TQ7402869868; 51°24′04″N 0°30′02″E | | 1086417 | Upload Photo | Q26377144 |
| 84, Frindsbury Road | II | 84, Frindsbury Road | | | 23 August 1974 | TQ7403469876; 51°24′04″N 0°30′02″E | Late 18C brick house. | 1336170 | 84, Frindsbury Road | Q26620688 |
| Red House | II | 195, Frindsbury Road | | | 29 April 1994 | TQ7427070145; 51°24′13″N 0°30′15″E | Mid 18C house with early 19C front. | 1262809 | Upload Photo | Q26553661 |
| Old Parsonage | II | Parsonage Lane | | | 2 December 1991 | TQ7447869831; 51°24′02″N 0°30′25″E | 1700 brick house with painted stucco render over. Originally All Saints Church rectory, | 1336172 | Old Parsonage | Q26620690 |
| Parish Church of St Mary | II* | Vicarage Road | | | 16 May 1991 | TQ7387469521; 51°23′53″N 0°29′53″E | Victorian church 1868–9. Listing describes it as "outstanding". "thoroughly convincing ... tautly designed and with an excellent use of materials" | 1121550 | Upload Photo | Q17551356 |

=== Strood ===
| Name | Grade | Location | Type | Completed | Date designated | Grid ref. Geo-coordinates | Notes | Entry number | Image | Wikidata |
|---|---|---|---|---|---|---|---|---|---|---|
| 20, Gun Lane | II | 20, Gun Lane | | | 2 December 1991 | TQ7354769373; 51°23′49″N 0°29′36″E | | 1119627 | Upload Photo | Q26412936 |
| Former Parish Church of St Nicholas, With Day Centre | II | High Street | | | 24 October 1950 | TQ7354169295; 51°23′46″N 0°29′35″E | | 1086418 | Upload Photo | Q26377148 |
| Temple Manor | I | Knight Road | | | 24 October 1950 | TQ7331368535; 51°23′22″N 0°29′22″E | | 1120910 | Upload Photo | Q7698615 |
| 10,12 and 14, London Road | II | 10,12 and 14, London Road | | | 23 August 1974 | TQ7339269297; 51°23′46″N 0°29′28″E | | 1322986 | Upload Photo | Q26608748 |
| 16 and 18, London Road | II | 16 and 18, London Road | | | 23 August 1974 | TQ7338169300; 51°23′46″N 0°29′27″E | | 1086419 | Upload Photo | Q26377152 |
| Crispin and Crispianus Public House | II | 8, London Road | | | 24 October 1950 | TQ7341169293; 51°23′46″N 0°29′29″E | | 1336171 | Upload Photo | Q26620689 |
| The Former Three Gardners Public House | II | 4, North Street | | | 23 August 1974 | TQ7369569317; 51°23′47″N 0°29′43″E | | 1322989 | Upload Photo | Q26608751 |
| 6, 8 and 10, North Street | II | 6, 8 and 10, North Street | | | 23 August 1974 | TQ7369669331; 51°23′47″N 0°29′44″E | | 1086420 | Upload Photo | Q26377156 |
| Bryant House | II | 1, Bryant Road | | | 19 February 1970 | TQ7347369363; 51°23′48″N 0°29′32″E | | 1336168 | Upload Photo | Q26620686 |
| Strood Conservative Club | II | 49, Cuxton Road | | | 19 March 1985 | TQ7327969087; 51°23′40″N 0°29′22″E | | 1086416 | Upload Photo | Q26377139 |
| 20, Gun Lane | II | 20, Gun Lane | | | 2 December 1991 | TQ7354769373; 51°23′49″N 0°29′36″E | | 1119627 | Upload Photo | Q26412936 |

== See also ==
- Grade I listed buildings in Kent
- Grade II* listed buildings in Kent
- Listed buildings in Frindsbury
- Listed buildings in Medway, non civil parish (Chatham, Gillingham, Rainham)

== Sources ==
- Newman, John (1980) [1969], Kent: West and the Weald, The Buildings of England, New Haven and London: Yale University Press, ISBN 978-0-3000-9614-9
- Newman, John (2012) [1969], Kent: West and the Weald, The Buildings of England, New Haven and London: Yale University Press, ISBN 978-0-300-18509-6
