= Listed buildings in Medway, non civil parish (Chatham, Gillingham, Rainham) =

Historic structures in Kent, England

Medway is a unitary authority area with borough status in Kent, England. There are civial parishes and unparished areas within the borough.

The unparished or non-civil parish area contains 35 grade I, 72 grade II* and 416 grade II listed buildings that are recorded in the National Heritage List for England.

This list contains the listed buildings for the towns of Chatham, Gillingham and Rainham.

For the town of Rochester, the unparished area of Frindsbury and the town of Strood see: Listed buildings in Medway, non civil parish (Frindsbury, Rochester, Strood).

This list is based on the information retrieved online from Historic England.

== Key ==
Grade	Criteria
I	Buildings that are of exceptional interest
II*	Particularly important buildings of more than special interest
II	Buildings that are of special interest

== Listing ==
=== Chatham ===
Name	Grade	Location	Type	Completed (Note: The date given is the date used by Historic England as significant for the initial building or that of an important part in the structure's description.)	Date designated	Grid ref. (Note: The grid reference is based on the British national grid reference system, sometimes known as OSGB36, used by the Ordnance Survey.) Geo-coordinates	Notes	Entry number (Note: The "List Entry Number" is a unique number assigned to each listed building and scheduled monument by Historic England.)	Image	Wikidata
Former Ordnance Store	II				22 April 2013	TQ7582468435; 51°23′16″N 0°31′32″E		1410368	Upload Photo	Q26676154
Former C18 barrack block, Kitchener Barracks	II				22 April 2013	TQ7593968646; 51°23′22″N 0°31′38″E		1410725	Upload Photo	Q26676168
Six sections of boundary wall	II				22 April 2013	TQ7588668710; 51°23′25″N 0°31′36″E		1411051	Upload Photo	Q26676192
5 and 6 Prospect Row, Including Attached Front Area Railings and Rear Boundary Wall	II				21 December 1973	TQ7615168768; 51°23′26″N 0°31′49″E		1259654	Upload Photo	Q26550751
Former Hatchelling House and Engine Room	II*	Anchor Wharf			24 May 1971	TQ7582569009; 51°23′34″N 0°31′33″E		1268248	Upload Photo	Q17551533
Queens Stairs With Overthrow Arch	II	Anchor Wharf			24 May 1971	TQ7577969114; 51°23′38″N 0°31′31″E		1268249	Upload Photo	Q17649541
The Ropery and Spinning Room	I	Anchor Wharf			24 May 1971	TQ7578768842; 51°23′29″N 0°31′31″E		1268250	Upload Photo	Q17533432
Former Storehouse Number 3 and Former Chain Cable Store	I	Anchor Wharf			13 August 1999	TQ7574268765; 51°23′27″N 0°31′28″E		1378584	Upload Photo	Q17533483
Former Storehouse Number 2 and Former Rigging Store	I	Anchor Wharf			13 August 1999	TQ7578368951; 51°23′33″N 0°31′31″E		1378585	Upload Photo	Q17533495
Former Assistant Queens Harbourmasters Office	II*	Anchor Wharf			13 August 1999	TQ7578769107; 51°23′38″N 0°31′31″E		1378596	Upload Photo	Q17551677
Former Guard House	II*	Anchor Wharf			13 August 1999	TQ7570368666; 51°23′23″N 0°31′26″E		1378598	Upload Photo	Q17551687
Capstone Farmhouse	II	Capstone Road			29 October 1952	TQ7817165239; 51°21′30″N 0°33′27″E		1268251	Upload Photo	Q26558576
McCudden War Memorial and Grave	II	Chatham			23 March 2018	TQ7571566513; 51°22′14″N 0°31′23″E		1453856	Upload Photo	Q66479427
Old Theatre Royal	II	High Street, Chatham			5 October 1988	TQ7558367966; 51°23′01″N 0°31′19″E		1268237	Upload Photo	Q26558566
Former Officers Terrace and Attached Front Area Walls and Overthrows	I	1-12, Church Lane			24 May 1971	TQ7598269154; 51°23′39″N 0°31′41″E		1268220	Upload Photo	Q17533407
Former Captain of the Dockyards House and Attached Front Area Railings	II*	Church Lane			24 May 1971	TQ7595569085; 51°23′37″N 0°31′40″E		1268221	Upload Photo	Q17551479
Former Cashiers Office	II*	Church Lane			24 May 1971	TQ7594369074; 51°23′36″N 0°31′39″E		1268222	Upload Photo	Q17551499
Sail Loft	I	Church Lane			13 August 1999	TQ7595169034; 51°23′35″N 0°31′40″E		1378586	Upload Photo	Q17533503
Front and Perimeter Walls to Raised Gardens to Rear of Former Officers' Terrace	II*	Church Lane			13 August 1999	TQ7604269120; 51°23′38″N 0°31′44″E		1378599	Upload Photo	Q17551695
Wall Surrounding Garden to Rear of Former Commissioners House	II*	Church Lane			13 August 1999	TQ7592669026; 51°23′35″N 0°31′38″E		1378636	Upload Photo	Q17551800
South Tower House	II*	College Road			13 August 1999	TQ7599869044; 51°23′35″N 0°31′42″E		1378601	Upload Photo	Q17551700
North Tower House and Attached Perimeter Wall to the South	II*	College Road			13 August 1999	TQ7608469194; 51°23′40″N 0°31′47″E		1378603	Upload Photo	Q17551705
Stables, North Range and Attached Perimeter Wall	II*	College Road			13 August 1999	TQ7596068986; 51°23′33″N 0°31′40″E		1378605	Upload Photo	Q17551712
Stable, South Range and Attached Wall to South	II*	College Road			13 August 1999	TQ7594268972; 51°23′33″N 0°31′39″E		1378606	Upload Photo	Q17551723
Former Lead and Paint Mill	I	Cottage Road			13 August 1999	TQ7582368757; 51°23′26″N 0°31′32″E		1378588	Upload Photo	Q17533515
Former Hemp House, Spinning Room and Offices	II*	Cottage Road			13 August 1999	TQ7583968955; 51°23′33″N 0°31′34″E		1378608	Upload Photo	Q17551732
Former Tarred Yarn House	II*	Cottage Road			13 August 1999	TQ7581668868; 51°23′30″N 0°31′32″E		1378610	Upload Photo	Q17551739
The Cottage and Attached Front Garden Walls	II	Cottage Road			13 August 1999	TQ7585368843; 51°23′29″N 0°31′34″E		1378640	Upload Photo	Q26658979
Chest Tomb Approximately 20 Metres South of Chancel, Church of St Mary the Virgin	II	Dock Road			21 November 1996	TQ7574768391; 51°23′14″N 0°31′28″E		1268223	Upload Photo	Q26558553
Chest Tomb Approximately 40 Metres South of Chancel, Church of St Mary the Virgin	II	Dock Road			21 November 1996	TQ7574268378; 51°23′14″N 0°31′28″E		1268224	Upload Photo	Q26558554
Chest Tomb Approximately 5 Metres South of Tower, Church of St Mary the Virgin	II	Dock Road			21 November 1997	TQ7573068398; 51°23′15″N 0°31′27″E		1268225	Upload Photo	Q26558555
Chest Tomb Approximately 5 Metres South of South Aisle, Church of St Mary the Virgin	II	Dock Road			21 November 1996	TQ7574068400; 51°23′15″N 0°31′28″E		1268226	Upload Photo	Q26558556
Command House and Attached Entrance Railings, Stable and Carriage House and Rear Wall	II	Dock Road			24 May 1971	TQ7569668373; 51°23′14″N 0°31′25″E		1268227	Upload Photo	Q26558557
Medway Heritage Centre	II	Dock Road			29 October 1952	TQ7574368421; 51°23′15″N 0°31′28″E		1268229	Upload Photo	Q26558559
Statue of Lord Kitchener Approximately 50 Metres West of Entrance to Kitchener Barracks	II	Dock Road			24 May 1971	TQ7579668410; 51°23′15″N 0°31′30″E		1268230	Upload Photo	Q26558560
Former Ordnance Store at Chatham Gun Wharf	II	Dock Road			31 August 2004	TQ7570568282; 51°23′11″N 0°31′26″E		1391071	Upload Photo	Q26670439
Gun Wharf, Dock Road, Chatham	II	Dock Road			26 January 2015	TQ7571968538; 51°23′19″N 0°31′27″E		1422222	Upload Photo	Q26676933
Former House Carpenters Shop and Wall to Front Yard	II	East Road			13 August 1999	TQ7603769223; 51°23′41″N 0°31′44″E		1246988	Upload Photo	Q17649626
The Brunel Saw Mill	I	East Road			24 May 1971	TQ7617269302; 51°23′43″N 0°31′51″E		1268231	Upload Photo	Q17533421
Joiners Shop	II*	East Road			13 August 1999	TQ7598869259; 51°23′42″N 0°31′42″E		1378612	Upload Photo	Q17551745
Number 1 Smithery	II*	East Road			13 August 1999	TQ7602669320; 51°23′44″N 0°31′44″E		1378614	Upload Photo	Q17551750
Former Wheelwrights Shop	II*	East Road			13 August 1999	TQ7606469400; 51°23′47″N 0°31′46″E		1378637	Upload Photo	Q17551804
Police Section House	II	East Road			13 August 1999	TQ7624469431; 51°23′48″N 0°31′55″E		1378642	Upload Photo	Q17649589
Former Galvanising Shed (Visitor Centre)	II	East Road			13 August 1999	TQ7609069377; 51°23′46″N 0°31′47″E		1378644	Upload Photo	Q26658983
Timber Seasoning Store, North	II*	North, East Road			13 August 1999	TQ7611669363; 51°23′45″N 0°31′49″E		1378617	Upload Photo	Q17551757
Timber Seasoning Store, South	II*	South, East Road			13 August 1999	TQ7608069313; 51°23′44″N 0°31′47″E		1378619	Upload Photo	Q17551762
Chatham Naval War Memorial	I	Great Lines			5 December 1996	TQ7630068000; 51°23′01″N 0°31′56″E		1267787	Upload Photo	Q5087681
4 Hammond Hill	II	4, Hamond Hill			21 November 1996	TQ7538367893; 51°22′59″N 0°31′08″E		1268232	Upload Photo	Q26558561
104 and 106, High Street	II	104 and 106, High Street			2 March 1990	TQ7559367965; 51°23′01″N 0°31′19″E		1268234	Upload Photo	Q26558563
National Westminster Bank	II	148, High Street			21 November 1996	TQ7572367913; 51°22′59″N 0°31′26″E		1268235	Upload Photo	Q26558564
248, High Street	II	248, High Street			14 June 1977	TQ7599067707; 51°22′52″N 0°31′39″E		1268236	Upload Photo	Q26558565
35, High Street	II	35, High Street			28 February 2008	TQ7535667942; 51°23′00″N 0°31′07″E		1392426	Upload Photo	Q26671646
Tomb of Lazarus Magnus, Chatham Jewish Burial Ground	II	366, High Street			21 December 2022	TQ7511967883; 51°22′59″N 0°30′55″E		1483897	Upload Photo	Q122214026
The Hospital of Sir John Hawkins and Attached Front Railings	II	High Street			29 October 1952	TQ7525667936; 51°23′00″N 0°31′02″E		1268233	Upload Photo	Q26558562
St Bartholomews Chapel	II*	High Street			29 October 1952	TQ7524967892; 51°22′59″N 0°31′01″E		1268238	Upload Photo	Q17551508
Walls Surrounding Churchyard of St Bartholomews Chapel	II	High Street			21 November 1996	TQ7523467888; 51°22′59″N 0°31′00″E		1268239	Upload Photo	Q26558567
Chatham Ragged School	II	King Street			21 April 2020	TQ7609167956; 51°23′00″N 0°31′45″E		1468892	Upload Photo	Q97466300
Bell Mast	II	Leviathan Way			27 June 2011	TQ7618369726; 51°23′57″N 0°31′53″E		1400147	Upload Photo	Q26675405
Thorney Lodge	II	15, Luton Road			25 April 1985	TQ7653867396; 51°22′41″N 0°32′07″E		1268240	Upload Photo	Q26558568
19, Maidstone Road	II	19, Maidstone Road			27 September 2002	TQ7562367619; 51°22′50″N 0°31′20″E		1031909	Upload Photo	Q26283304
Number 4 Dry Dock	II	Main Gate Road			13 August 1999	TQ7588969360; 51°23′46″N 0°31′37″E		1246990	Upload Photo	Q26539340
Former Admirals Offices and Forecourt Walls and Attached Iron Railings	II*	Main Gate Road			24 May 1971	TQ7590769144; 51°23′39″N 0°31′37″E		1268199	Upload Photo	Q17551425
Former Police Offices and Attached Wall	II*	Main Gate Road			24 May 1971	TQ7590368926; 51°23′32″N 0°31′37″E		1268200	Upload Photo	Q17551439
Former Commissioner's House and Attached Staff Accommodation	I	Main Gate Road			24 May 1971	TQ7587669080; 51°23′37″N 0°31′36″E		1268201	Upload Photo	Q17533384
Main Gate and Attached Dockyard Perimeter Wall to South West	I	Main Gate Road			24 May 1971	TQ7588168888; 51°23′30″N 0°31′36″E		1268202	Upload Photo	Q17533395
The Royal Dockyard Church	II*	Main Gate Road			24 May 1971	TQ7589768975; 51°23′33″N 0°31′37″E		1268203	Upload Photo	Q17551448
Figurehead Approximately 50 Metres South of Royal Dockyard Church	II	Main Gate Road			24 May 1971	TQ7588868921; 51°23′31″N 0°31′36″E		1268204	Upload Photo	Q26558538
Clock Tower Building	II*	Main Gate Road			24 May 1971	TQ7593869214; 51°23′41″N 0°31′39″E		1268241	Upload Photo	Q17551521
The Guard House (Cafe)	II*	Main Gate Road			13 August 1999	TQ7585069018; 51°23′35″N 0°31′34″E		1378621	Upload Photo	Q17551766
Chatham Dock Pumping Station South	II*	Main Gate Road			13 August 1999	TQ7595069294; 51°23′43″N 0°31′40″E		1378623	Upload Photo	Q17551769
Guard House West and Store	II*	Main Gate Road			13 August 1999	TQ7587768902; 51°23′31″N 0°31′36″E		1378624	Upload Photo	Q17551772
The Bell Mast	II*	Main Gate Road			13 August 1999	TQ7586168896; 51°23′31″N 0°31′35″E		1378626	Upload Photo	Q17551776
Number 1 Workbase	II*	Main Gate Road			13 August 1999	TQ7585569215; 51°23′41″N 0°31′35″E		1378631	Upload Photo	Q17551782
Number 2 Dry Dock	II*	Main Gate Road			13 August 1999	TQ7586369245; 51°23′42″N 0°31′35″E		1378633	Upload Photo	Q17551785
Number 3 Dry Dock	II*	Main Gate Road			13 August 1999	TQ7586969304; 51°23′44″N 0°31′36″E		1378634	Upload Photo	Q17551790
The Customs House	II*	Main Gate Road			13 August 1999	TQ7586969021; 51°23′35″N 0°31′35″E		1378635	Upload Photo	Q17551796
Lamp Standards and Railings to Front of Commissioners House	II	Main Gate Street			24 May 1971	TQ7586269100; 51°23′37″N 0°31′35″E		1247000	Upload Photo	Q26539350
Former Mast House and Mould Loft	I	Main Road			13 August 1999	TQ7602569434; 51°23′48″N 0°31′44″E		1378590	Upload Photo	Q17533525
Number 3 Slip Cover	I	Main Road			13 August 1999	TQ7590369410; 51°23′47″N 0°31′38″E		1378591	Upload Photo	Q17533539
Numbers 4 5 and 6 Slip Covers and Machine Shop Number 6	I	Main Road			13 August 1999	TQ7595169499; 51°23′50″N 0°31′40″E		1378594	Upload Photo	Q17533550
Number 7 Slip Cover and Machine Shop Number 3	I	Main Road			13 August 1999	TQ7599369576; 51°23′53″N 0°31′43″E		1378595	Upload Photo	Q17533561
Reliance House and Attached Wall, Piers, Railings and Gates to Forecourt	II	Manor Road			20 November 2001	TQ7556767910; 51°22′59″N 0°31′18″E		1393527	Upload Photo	Q26672683
Chatham House (Number 14) And Attached Front Area and Step Railings	II	12-38, New Road			29 October 1952	TQ7574467633; 51°22′50″N 0°31′26″E		1268208	Upload Photo	Q26558542
2, New Road	II	2, New Road			29 October 1952	TQ7568667680; 51°22′52″N 0°31′23″E		1268205	Upload Photo	Q26558539
4 and 6, New Road	II	4 and 6, New Road			29 October 1952	TQ7569767672; 51°22′51″N 0°31′24″E		1268206	Upload Photo	Q26558540
Numbers 52 and 54 and Attached Front Area and Step Railings	II	52 And 54, New Road			21 November 1996	TQ7580867580; 51°22′48″N 0°31′30″E		1268209	Upload Photo	Q26558543
Number 58 and Attached Front Area and Step Railings	II	58, New Road			21 November 1996	TQ7581867572; 51°22′48″N 0°31′30″E		1268210	Upload Photo	Q26558544
60, New Road	II	60, New Road			21 November 1996	TQ7582367568; 51°22′48″N 0°31′30″E		1268211	Upload Photo	Q26558545
8 and 10, New Road	II	8 and 10, New Road			29 October 1952	TQ7570767664; 51°22′51″N 0°31′25″E		1268207	Upload Photo	Q26558541
Lord Duncan Public House	II	New Road			11 September 1974	TQ7585767582; 51°22′48″N 0°31′32″E		1268212	Upload Photo	Q26558546
Statue of Thomas Waghorn	II	New Road			29 October 1952	TQ7561867714; 51°22′53″N 0°31′20″E		1268213	Upload Photo	Q26558547
1-4, New Road Avenue	II	1-4, New Road Avenue			29 October 1952	TQ7527367817; 51°22′56″N 0°31′02″E		1268214	Upload Photo	Q26558548
5, New Road Avenue	II	5, New Road Avenue			21 November 1996	TQ7529567820; 51°22′56″N 0°31′03″E		1268215	Upload Photo	Q26558549
Lower Boat Store	II*	North Pondside Road			13 August 1999	TQ7624169635; 51°23′54″N 0°31′56″E		1378639	Upload Photo	Q17551808
Numbers 1-12 (Consecutive) And Attached Basement Area Railings	II	1-12, Ordnance Terrace			29 October 1952	TQ7545467580; 51°22′49″N 0°31′11″E		1268216	Upload Photo	Q26558550
The Homestead	II	46, Princes Avenue			1 November 1973	TQ7610363470; 51°20′35″N 0°31′38″E		1268217	Upload Photo	Q26558551
Church of St John the Divine	II*	Railway Street			29 October 1952	TQ7563267820; 51°22′56″N 0°31′21″E		1268218	Upload Photo	Q17551463
Pheasant House and Attached Front Garden Walls	II	2, Street End Road			29 October 1952	TQ7732966411; 51°22′09″N 0°32′46″E		1268219	Upload Photo	Q26558552
Former Town Hall and Medway Arts Centre	II	The Brook			1 June 1990	TQ7585568148; 51°23′06″N 0°31′33″E		1268228	Upload Photo	Q26558558
The Stables	II	The Terrace			13 August 1999	TQ7605469192; 51°23′40″N 0°31′45″E		1246991	Upload Photo	Q17649520
Snodhurst Farmhouse and Attached Former Outbuildings	II	Walderslade Road			24 May 1971	TQ7566465278; 51°21′34″N 0°31′18″E		1268177	Upload Photo	Q26558517
Pumping Station	II	West Road			13 August 1999	TQ7619170165; 51°24′11″N 0°31′54″E		1246993	Upload Photo	Q26539343

=== Gillingham and Rainham ===
Name	Grade	Location	Type	Completed	Date designated	Grid ref. Geo-coordinates	Notes	Entry number	Image	Wikidata
Former north entrance lodges and walls flanking 80 metres north west and 40 metres north east, HMS Pembroke	II	Barrack Road			6 June 1984	TQ7677769727; 51°23′57″N 0°32′23″E		1267802	Upload Photo	Q26558174
Brompton Barracks, Gymnasium	II*	Brompton Road			8 July 1998	TQ7638968895; 51°23′30″N 0°32′02″E		1375603	Upload Photo	Q17551625
Gillingham War Memorial	II	Junction Of Brompton Road And Mill Road			24 February 2016	TQ7695968691; 51°23′23″N 0°32′31″E		1433120	Upload Photo	Q26677893
Former Captain's House, HMS Pembroke	II	Central Avenue			6 June 1984	TQ7654569601; 51°23′53″N 0°32′11″E		1267805	Upload Photo	Q26558177
Former Chapel at HMS Pembroke	II	Central Avenue			6 June 1984	TQ7642069511; 51°23′50″N 0°32′05″E		1267807	Upload Photo	Q26558179
Memorial to French prisoners of war approximately 25 metres south of Church of St George	II	Central Avenue			6 June 1984	TQ7643769475; 51°23′49″N 0°32′05″E		1267808	Upload Photo	Q26558180
Former mess block 8 metres to north of central mess block, HMS Pembroke	II	Central Avenue			6 June 1984	TQ7658669554; 51°23′51″N 0°32′13″E		1267810	Upload Photo	Q26558182
Former mess block 8 metres to south of central mess block, HMS Pembroke	II	Central Avenue			6 June 1984	TQ7658969479; 51°23′49″N 0°32′13″E		1267811	Upload Photo	Q26558183
The Wardrooms	II	Central Avenue			6 June 1984	TQ7659269518; 51°23′50″N 0°32′14″E		1267813	Upload Photo	Q26558185
Church of St Mary Magdalen	II*	Church Street			24 February 1950	TQ7837468816; 51°23′25″N 0°33′44″E		1267814	Upload Photo	Q17551383
Chest Tomb Approximately 3 Metres North East of East End, Church of St Mary Magdalen	II	Church Street			5 December 1996	TQ7839768823; 51°23′25″N 0°33′46″E		1267815	Upload Photo	Q26558186
Chest Tomb Approimately 40 Metres North of East End of Church of St Mary Magdalen	II	Church Street			5 December 1996	TQ7839768840; 51°23′26″N 0°33′46″E		1267816	Upload Photo	Q26558187
Chest Tomb Approximately 3 Metres South of Chancel, Church of St Mary Magdalen	II	Church Street			5 December 1996	TQ7838468803; 51°23′25″N 0°33′45″E		1267817	Upload Photo	Q26558188
Chest Tomb Approximately 30 Metres North East of Church of St Mary Magdalen	II	Church Street			5 December 1996	TQ7841168828; 51°23′26″N 0°33′46″E		1267818	Upload Photo	Q26558189
Pedestal Tomb Approximately 5 Metres West of Tower, Church of St Mary Magdalen	II	Church Street			5 December 1996	TQ7835268823; 51°23′26″N 0°33′43″E		1267819	Upload Photo	Q26558190
Chest Tomb Approximately 5 Metres West of West End, Church of St Mary Magdalen	II	Church Street			5 December 1996	TQ7835468814; 51°23′25″N 0°33′43″E		1267820	Upload Photo	Q26558191
Main gate, lodge and walls to former HMS Pembroke	II	Cumberland Road			6 June 1984	TQ7642969557; 51°23′51″N 0°32′05″E		1267780	Upload Photo	Q26558155
Number 8 Machine Shop	II*	8, Dock Head Road			6 June 1984	TQ7653170022; 51°24′06″N 0°32′11″E		1267822	Upload Photo	Q17551406
Combined Ship Trade Office PP69 to Rear of Number 8 Machine Shop	II	Dock Head Road			6 June 1984	TQ7651970092; 51°24′09″N 0°32′11″E		1267779	Upload Photo	Q26558154
Boilershop	II*	Dock Head Road			6 June 1984	TQ7640369941; 51°24′04″N 0°32′05″E		1267821	Upload Photo	Q17551391
East Court Farmhouse	II	Eastcourt Lane			24 February 1950	TQ8010068358; 51°23′08″N 0°35′13″E		1267781	Upload Photo	Q26558156
6, Garden Street	II	6, Garden Street			21 December 1973	TQ7615368820; 51°23′28″N 0°31′50″E		1267782	Upload Photo	Q26558157
Numbers 22 and 24 and Attached Front Basement Iron Railings	II	Garden Street			21 December 1973	TQ7620968798; 51°23′27″N 0°31′52″E		1267783	Upload Photo	Q26558158
Former Anson Barrack	II	Central Avenue			28 September 1990	TQ7675069522; 51°23′50″N 0°32′22″E		1267803	Upload Photo	Q26558175
Former Blake Barrack	II	Central Avenue			28 September 1990	TQ7665069519; 51°23′50″N 0°32′17″E		1267804	Upload Photo	Q26558176
Walls and gate piers enclosing front drive and west garden, former Captain's House	II	Central Avenue			6 June 1984	TQ7653469584; 51°23′52″N 0°32′11″E		1267806	Upload Photo	Q26558178
Former Grenville Barrack	II	Central Avenue			28 September 1990	TQ7680169524; 51°23′50″N 0°32′24″E		1267809	Upload Photo	Q26558181
Former Nelson Barrack	II	Central Avenue			28 September 1990	TQ7670169521; 51°23′50″N 0°32′19″E		1267812	Upload Photo	Q26558184
Rainham war memorial	II	High Street			20 September 2017	TQ8168665909; 51°21′47″N 0°36′30″E		1448409	Upload Photo	Q66478885
Pope Farm	II	Meresborough Road			13 September 1974	TQ8199764203; 51°20′52″N 0°36′43″E		1259668	Upload Photo	Q26550765
Dockyard Canteen	II	North Road			6 June 1984	TQ7665069634; 51°23′54″N 0°32′17″E		1259641	Upload Photo	Q26550738
The Drill Hall	II	North Road, Gillingham			6 June 1984	TQ7677069652; 51°23′54″N 0°32′23″E		1259644	Upload Photo	Q15215110
Gymnasium	II	North Road, Gillingham			8 July 1998	TQ7692769645; 51°23′54″N 0°32′31″E		1375604	Upload Photo	Q26656374
Swimming pool	II	North Road, Gillingham			8 July 1998	TQ7689169650; 51°23′54″N 0°32′29″E		1375605	Upload Photo	Q26656375
Grench Manor	II	Grange Road			6 November 1990	TQ7933568487; 51°23′14″N 0°34′33″E		1267785	Upload Photo	Q26558159
Remains of Chapel in North East Corner of Garden, Grench Manor	II	Grench Manor, Grange Road			24 February 1950	TQ7932068519; 51°23′15″N 0°34′33″E		1267786	Upload Photo	Q26558160
4, Harrow Road	II	4, Harrow Road			12 August 1983	TQ7907364640; 51°21′09″N 0°34′13″E		1267788	Upload Photo	Q26558161
The Green Lion Hotel	II	104, High Street			24 February 1950	TQ8182765864; 51°21′46″N 0°36′37″E		1267789	Upload Photo	Q26558162
The Old Parsonage	II	113, High Street			24 February 1950	TQ8180665901; 51°21′47″N 0°36′36″E		1267790	Upload Photo	Q26558163
Durland House	II	160, High Street			24 February 1950	TQ8201565811; 51°21′44″N 0°36′47″E		1267791	Upload Photo	Q26558164
174, High Street	II	174, High Street			24 February 1950	TQ8207065799; 51°21′43″N 0°36′50″E		1267792	Upload Photo	Q26558165
The Golden Lion	II	18, High Street			15 September 2003	TQ7611668887; 51°23′30″N 0°31′48″E		1390625	Upload Photo	Q26670012
Pair of Chest Tombs Approximately 5 Metres South of Chancel, Church of St Margaret	II	Church Of St Margaret, High Street			5 December 1996	TQ8175265863; 51°21′46″N 0°36′34″E		1267798	Upload Photo	Q26558170
Church of St Margaret	I	High Street			24 February 1950	TQ8173665881; 51°21′47″N 0°36′33″E		1267793	Upload Photo	Q17533373
Walls Surrounding Churchyard of Church of St Margaret	II	High Street			5 December 1996	TQ8176965882; 51°21′47″N 0°36′34″E		1267794	Upload Photo	Q26558166
Headstone of Thomas Lane, Approximately 15 Metres South of Church of St Margaret	II	High Street			5 December 1996	TQ8173465855; 51°21′46″N 0°36′33″E		1267795	Upload Photo	Q26558167
Headstone of Children of Will Scott, Approximately 20 Metres South of Church of St Margaret	II	High Street			5 December 1996	TQ8173565848; 51°21′45″N 0°36′33″E		1267796	Upload Photo	Q26558168
Obelisk Tomb of John Chambers, Approximately 5 Metres South West of Church of St Margaret	II	High Street			5 December 1996	TQ8170865870; 51°21′46″N 0°36′31″E		1267797	Upload Photo	Q26558169
The Ship Public House	II	Leyfield Road			21 December 1973	TQ7871769029; 51°23′32″N 0°34′03″E		1267799	Upload Photo	Q26558171
Bridge, with railings, stairs, abutment and lamps to north side of Central Avenue	II	Lower East Road			6 June 1984	TQ7672669591; 51°23′52″N 0°32′21″E		1267800	Upload Photo	Q26558172
Magnolia House	II	141, Lower Rainham Road			21 December 1973	TQ7984768656; 51°23′18″N 0°35′00″E		1259728	Upload Photo	Q26550823
Peckham Cottage	II	143 And 145, Lower Rainham Road			21 December 1973	TQ7985668654; 51°23′18″N 0°35′01″E		1259729	Upload Photo	Q26550824
Peckham Lodge	II	147, Lower Rainham Road			21 December 1973	TQ7987168657; 51°23′18″N 0°35′01″E		1259730	Upload Photo	Q26550825
497, 499, and 501, Lower Rainham Road	II	497, 499, and 501, Lower Rainham Road			21 December 1973	TQ8129367677; 51°22′45″N 0°36′13″E		1259732	Upload Photo	Q26550827
Bay Tree Villa	II	Lower Rainham Road			15 February 1989	TQ8058968215; 51°23′03″N 0°35′38″E		1259731	Upload Photo	Q26550826
Bloors Place	II*	Lower Rainham Road			24 February 1950	TQ8148067478; 51°22′38″N 0°36′22″E		1267763	Upload Photo	Q17551376
Garden Walls to South and East of Bloors Place	II	Lower Rainham Road			27 January 1984	TQ8148467437; 51°22′37″N 0°36′23″E		1267767	Upload Photo	Q26558142
Range of Outbuildings Including Cart Lodge and Granary West of Bloors Place	II	Lower Rainham Road			28 February 1989	TQ8141767512; 51°22′40″N 0°36′19″E		1267769	Upload Photo	Q26558144
The Black House	II	Lower Rainham Road			14 February 1994	TQ8073068158; 51°23′01″N 0°35′45″E		1267773	Upload Photo	Q26558148
The Old House	II	Lower Rainham Road			24 February 1950	TQ8132767648; 51°22′44″N 0°36′15″E		1267776	Upload Photo	Q26558151
Little London Farmhouse	II	Lower Twydall Lane			21 December 1973	TQ8026967846; 51°22′52″N 0°35′21″E		1259706	Upload Photo	Q26550801
Manor Barn and Attached North and West Walls	II	Lower Twydall Lane			19 November 1985	TQ8038667892; 51°22′53″N 0°35′27″E		1259709	Upload Photo	Q26550804
Manor House and Attached Garden Wall	II	Lower Twydall Lane			24 February 1950	TQ8034067913; 51°22′54″N 0°35′24″E		1259712	Upload Photo	Q26550807
Twydall Barn and Attached Wall	II	Lower Twydall Lane			19 November 1985	TQ8034567884; 51°22′53″N 0°35′25″E		1259714	Upload Photo	Q26550809
York Farmhouse	II	Lower Twydall Lane			16 August 1983	TQ8021467701; 51°22′47″N 0°35′17″E		1259716	Upload Photo	Q26550811
1, Mansion Row	II	1, Mansion Row			15 September 2003	TQ7630068923; 51°23′31″N 0°31′57″E		1390627	Upload Photo	Q26670014
11, Mansion Row	II	11, Mansion Row			24 February 1950	TQ7627068849; 51°23′29″N 0°31′56″E		1259727	Upload Photo	Q26550822
12, Mansion Row	II	12, Mansion Row			24 February 1950	TQ7626868844; 51°23′29″N 0°31′56″E		1259685	Upload Photo	Q26550780
12A and 14, Mansion Row	II	12A and 14, Mansion Row			24 February 1950	TQ7626568837; 51°23′28″N 0°31′55″E		1259687	Upload Photo	Q26550782
Mansion House	II	15, Mansion Row			24 February 1950	TQ7626068828; 51°23′28″N 0°31′55″E		1259688	Upload Photo	Q26550783
2 and 3, Mansion Row	II	2 and 3, Mansion Row			24 February 1950	TQ7629668915; 51°23′31″N 0°31′57″E		1259718	Upload Photo	Q26550813
Cambridge House	II	4, Mansion Row			24 February 1950	TQ7629268905; 51°23′30″N 0°31′57″E		1259720	Upload Photo	Q26550815
5 and 6, Mansion Row	II	5 and 6, Mansion Row			24 February 1950	TQ7628768892; 51°23′30″N 0°31′57″E		1259721	Upload Photo	Q26550816
7 and 8, Mansion Row	II	7 and 8, Mansion Row			24 February 1950	TQ7628268879; 51°23′30″N 0°31′56″E		1259724	Upload Photo	Q26550819
9 and 10, Mansion Row	II	9 and 10, Mansion Row			24 February 1950	TQ7627368855; 51°23′29″N 0°31′56″E		1259725	Upload Photo	Q26550820
Brompton Garrison Church	II	Maxwell Road			27 June 1991	TQ7614068540; 51°23′19″N 0°31′48″E		1259691	Upload Photo	Q26550786
10, Medway Road	II	10, Medway Road			21 December 1973	TQ7711169151; 51°23′38″N 0°32′40″E		1259699	Upload Photo	Q26550794
12, Medway Road	II	12, Medway Road			21 December 1973	TQ7712069160; 51°23′38″N 0°32′40″E		1259701	Upload Photo	Q26550796
14, Medway Road	II	14, Medway Road			21 December 1973	TQ7712969164; 51°23′38″N 0°32′41″E		1259702	Upload Photo	Q26550797
16, Medway Road	II	16, Medway Road			21 December 1973	TQ7713869172; 51°23′38″N 0°32′41″E		1259705	Upload Photo	Q26550800
18, Medway Road	II	18, Medway Road			21 December 1973	TQ7714769179; 51°23′38″N 0°32′42″E		1259662	Upload Photo	Q26550759
20, Medway Road	II	20, Medway Road			21 December 1973	TQ7715469186; 51°23′39″N 0°32′42″E		1259663	Upload Photo	Q26550760
4, Medway Road	II	4, Medway Road			21 December 1973	TQ7708369135; 51°23′37″N 0°32′38″E		1259694	Upload Photo	Q26550789
6, Medway Road	II	6, Medway Road			21 December 1973	TQ7709269140; 51°23′37″N 0°32′39″E		1259696	Upload Photo	Q26550791
8, Medway Road	II	8, Medway Road			21 December 1973	TQ7710069146; 51°23′37″N 0°32′39″E		1259697	Upload Photo	Q26550792
Group of Anti-tank Pimples	II	Medway Road			28 February 2008	TQ7714169209; 51°23′39″N 0°32′41″E		1392428	Upload Photo	Q26671648
Hollytree Cottage	II	8, Meresborough Road			18 February 1985	TQ8194764184; 51°20′51″N 0°36′41″E		1259664	Upload Photo	Q26550761
Siloam	II	Miers Court Road			21 December 1973	TQ8185964993; 51°21′18″N 0°36′37″E		1259670	Upload Photo	Q26550766
Well House Opposite Miers Court (Miers Court Not Included)	II	Miers Court Road			21 December 1973	TQ8138364419; 51°21′00″N 0°36′12″E		1259671	Upload Photo	Q26550767
Nile Cottage	II	78, 79 And 80, Mill Road			12 November 1981	TQ7706969109; 51°23′36″N 0°32′37″E		1259673	Upload Photo	Q26550769
East Moor Street Cottages	II	1 And 2, Moor Street			21 December 1973	TQ8293365560; 51°21′35″N 0°37′34″E		1259677	Upload Photo	Q26550773
Pooh House the Homestead	II	2, Moor Street			21 December 1973	TQ8298565536; 51°21′34″N 0°37′37″E		1259676	Upload Photo	Q26550772
Moor Street House	II	Moor Street			24 February 1950	TQ8305165581; 51°21′35″N 0°37′40″E		1259679	Upload Photo	Q26550775
The Cowls the Oast the Press	II	Moor Street			21 December 1973	TQ8310965566; 51°21′35″N 0°37′43″E		1259681	Upload Photo	Q26550776
West Moor Farmhouse	II	Moor Street			24 February 1950	TQ8280665599; 51°21′36″N 0°37′28″E		1259683	Upload Photo	Q26550778
Westmoor Cottage	II	Moor Street			15 September 2003	TQ8270965651; 51°21′38″N 0°37′23″E		1390626	Upload Photo	Q26670013
Boer War Memorial Arch, Brompton Barracks	II*	Brompton Barracks, Pasley Road			8 July 1998	TQ7642869040; 51°23′35″N 0°32′04″E		1375606	Upload Photo	Q17551627
Crimean War Memorial Arch and Gates, Brompton Barracks	II*	Brompton Barracks, Pasley Road			8 July 1998	TQ7637169063; 51°23′35″N 0°32′01″E		1375607	Upload Photo	Q17551633
Lecture Theatre, Brompton Barracks	II	Brompton Barracks, Pasley Road			8 July 1998	TQ7636169018; 51°23′34″N 0°32′01″E		1375608	Upload Photo	Q26656376
Lord Kitchener Memorial, Brompton Barracks	II	Brompton Barracks, Pasley Road			8 July 1998	TQ7639569053; 51°23′35″N 0°32′03″E		1375609	Upload Photo	Q26656377
Memorial to General Gordon, Brompton Barracks	II*	Brompton Barracks, Pasley Road			8 July 1998	TQ7644969031; 51°23′34″N 0°32′05″E		1375610	Upload Photo	Q17551638
North Block and Attached Basement Area Railings, Brompton Barracks	II*	Brompton Barracks, Pasley Road			8 July 1998	TQ7631769143; 51°23′38″N 0°31′59″E		1375611	Upload Photo	Q17551644
Officers Block and Attached Front Basement Railings, Brompton Barracks	II*	Brompton Barracks, Pasley Road			8 July 1998	TQ7621869125; 51°23′38″N 0°31′54″E		1375612	Upload Photo	Q17551659
Headquarters Royal School For Military Engineers and Attached Basement Area Railings, Brompton Barracks	II	Brompton Barracks, Pasley Road			8 July 1998	TQ7647669021; 51°23′34″N 0°32′07″E		1375613	Upload Photo	Q26656378
School House, Brompton Barracks	II	Brompton Barracks, Pasley Road			8 July 1998	TQ7639369104; 51°23′37″N 0°32′03″E		1375614	Upload Photo	Q26656379
South Block and Attached Front Basement Area Railings, Brompton Barracks	II*	Brompton Barracks, Pasley Road			8 July 1998	TQ7627569052; 51°23′35″N 0°31′56″E		1375615	Upload Photo	Q17551668
Royal Engineers Museum, Brompton Barracks	II	Brompton Barracks, Prince Arthur Road			5 December 1996	TQ7664768972; 51°23′32″N 0°32′15″E		1259646	Upload Photo	Q7374153
Numbers 10 and 11 and Attached Front Railing	II	10 And 11, Prospect Row			21 December 1973	TQ7613568750; 51°23′26″N 0°31′49″E		1259618	Upload Photo	Q26550715
Number 12 and Attached Front Basement Area Railings	II	12, Prospect Row			24 February 1950	TQ7613368742; 51°23′25″N 0°31′48″E		1259620	Upload Photo	Q26550717
13, Prospect Row	II	13, Prospect Row			24 February 1950	TQ7613168735; 51°23′25″N 0°31′48″E		1259622	Upload Photo	Q26550719
14, Prospect Row	II	14, Prospect Row			21 December 1973	TQ7612868728; 51°23′25″N 0°31′48″E		1259623	Upload Photo	Q26550720
15, Prospect Row	II	15, Prospect Row			24 February 1950	TQ7612668719; 51°23′25″N 0°31′48″E		1259625	Upload Photo	Q26550722
16, Prospect Row	II	16, Prospect Row			21 December 1973	TQ7612468713; 51°23′24″N 0°31′48″E		1259627	Upload Photo	Q26550724
17 and 18, Prospect Row	II	17 and 18, Prospect Row			21 December 1973	TQ7612268706; 51°23′24″N 0°31′48″E		1259629	Upload Photo	Q26550726
19, Prospect Row	II	19, Prospect Row			21 December 1973	TQ7611968698; 51°23′24″N 0°31′48″E		1259631	Upload Photo	Q26550728
2, Prospect Row	II	2, Prospect Row			21 December 1973	TQ7614968796; 51°23′27″N 0°31′49″E		1259650	Upload Photo	Q26550747
20, Prospect Row	II	20, Prospect Row			24 February 1950	TQ7611768692; 51°23′24″N 0°31′48″E		1259632	Upload Photo	Q26550729
3 and 4, Prospect Row	II	3 and 4, Prospect Row			24 February 1950	TQ7614668788; 51°23′27″N 0°31′49″E		1259652	Upload Photo	Q26550749
7, Prospect Row	II	7, Prospect Row			21 December 1973	TQ7614068767; 51°23′26″N 0°31′49″E		1259657	Upload Photo	Q26550754
Number 8 and Attached Iron Railings	II	8, Prospect Row			21 December 1973	TQ7613868762; 51°23′26″N 0°31′49″E		1259658	Upload Photo	Q26550755
9, Prospect Row	II	9, Prospect Row			21 December 1973	TQ7613768758; 51°23′26″N 0°31′49″E		1259660	Upload Photo	Q26550757
King George V Public House	II	Prospect Row			21 December 1973	TQ7615568800; 51°23′27″N 0°31′50″E		1259634	Upload Photo	Q26550731
Chapel House	II	1 And 2, Pump Lane			21 December 1973	TQ8118767712; 51°22′46″N 0°36′08″E		1259635	Upload Photo	Q26550732
Pump Farmhouse	II	Pump Lane			21 December 1973	TQ8092667514; 51°22′40″N 0°35′54″E		1259637	Upload Photo	Q26550734
Macklands	II	Station Road			9 December 1975	TQ8227766787; 51°22′15″N 0°37′02″E		1259638	Upload Photo	Q26550735
Oasthouses and Theatre	II	1-9, Stratford Lane			21 December 1973	TQ8189465779; 51°21′43″N 0°36′41″E		1259639	Upload Photo	Q26550736
Holy Trinity Church	II	Twydall Lane			29 October 2009	TQ7986767057; 51°22′27″N 0°34′58″E		1393500	Upload Photo	Q26672657
Salcombe Cottage and Attached Cast Iron Railings	II	23, Wyles Street			17 July 1980	TQ7726269122; 51°23′36″N 0°32′47″E		1259599	Upload Photo	Q26550696
Medway Hospital, Laundry Water Tower	II	York Avenue			5 December 1996	TQ7705667700; 51°22′51″N 0°32′34″E		1259601	Upload Photo	Q26550698

== See also ==
- Grade I listed buildings in Kent
- Grade II* listed buildings in Kent

== Sources ==
- Newman, John (2012) [1969], Kent: West and the Weald, The Buildings of England, New Haven and London: Yale University Press, ISBN 978-0-300-18509-6
