= All Saints Church, Frindsbury =

Church in Kent, England

Coordinates: 51°24′02″N 0°30′21″E

All Saints, Frindsbury
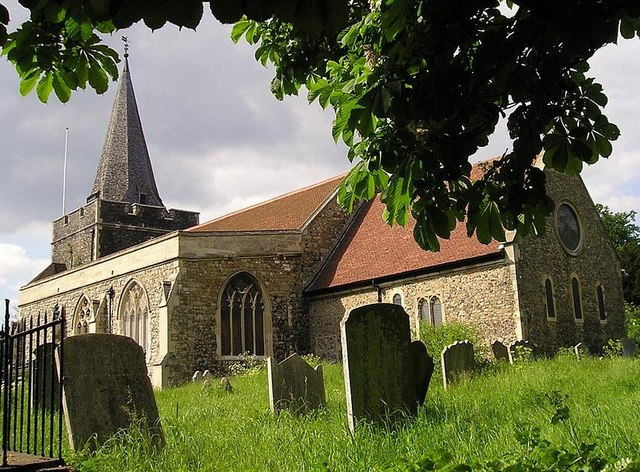

- Shown within Kent
- OS grid reference: TQ 74412 69801
- Location: Church Green, Frindsbury, Rochester, Kent ME2 4HE
- Country: England
- Denomination: Anglican
- Website: http://www.allsaintsfrindsbury.co.uk/

History
- Status: Parish church

Architecture
- Functional status: Active
- Heritage designation: Grade II*
- Designated: 24 October 1950
- Architectural type: Church

Specifications
- Materials: Caen Stone and flint

Administration
- Province: Canterbury
- Diocese: Rochester
- Parish: The Parish of Frindsbury with Upnor and Chattenden

Clergy
- Vicar: Rev Nicholas Cooper

All Saints, Frindsbury, is a parish church serving the combined parish of Frindsbury with Upnor and Chattenden. The church dates from 1075 and lies in the north-west corner of the Medway Towns, historically part of Kent, England. It is a Grade II* listed building, National Heritage List number 1107886.

== History ==
=== Early history of Frindsbury ===
The Romans built a stone bridge across the Medway and laid a road on a causeway across the marshy ground below what is now Frindsbury. Evidence of a causewayed road along the bank towards the Frindsbury Peninsula leading to a villa was found in 1819. The present road and field pattern suggest that there was a substantial Roman agricultural settlement centred near Frindsbury.

Bishop Eardulf of Rochester obtained Freandisberi and Wicham in 747. Either in confirmation or in addition Offa, King of Mercia, and Sigered, joint King of Kent, granted 20 sulungs of land at Aeslingham in Freodesbrei to the bishop in 764. In 778, King Egbert gave more land to the bishop. In 840, 994, and 998 AD Strood was pillaged by the Danes. The area was wrested from the church and eventually came under the control of Harold Godwinson. After Harold's defeat at the Battle of Hastings, William the Conqueror gave the lands to Odo, Bishop of Bayeux, Earl of Kent, and William's half brother. Archbishop Lanfranc recovered them again at the Trial of Penenden Heath (c. 1072) and restored them to Bishop Gundulf of Rochester. Gundulf was responsible for commencing the rebuilding of Rochester Cathedral and establishing the Benedictine Priory of St Andrew based upon it. He gave the land at Frindsbury to the new priory, though insisting they paid a sum to him or his successors on St Andrew's day.

=== The Medieval Church ===
Whether there was a Saxon church at Frindsbury is not known for certain, however Wade regards it as "highly probable". The original Norman church was rebuilt in stone around 1075 by Paulinus, sacrist of Rochester who gave books and vestments to it. The Domesday Book records the presence of the church in 1086, but no further details of it. Domesday does however record that the bishop was entitled to 10 shillings (50p) from the manor of Frindsbury. The church was rebuilt in 1127. The term "rebuilding" may refer to a large repair rather than a complete reconstruction. Dugdale says that John (Bishop of Rochester 1125–1137) "built the church of Frindsbury ... of stone, from the treasury of Rochester church".

A small wooden church was erected at Strood in 1122 as a chapel of ease to the parish church. It became St Nicholas', the parish church of Strood in 1193 and is situated where the Watling Street left the firm ground to run over the marshes to the Medway bridge.

Bishop Gilbert de Glanvill claimed Frinsdsbury back from the monks "as belonging to the maintenance of his table" in 1185. According to Hasted the bishop succeeded in obtaining the church, but the manor remained in the possession of the monks until the dissolution of the monasteries under Henry VIII in 1523. Barnard however records that in 1256, the church of Frindsbury (and thus the income) was returned to the Bishop.

There was a chapel dedicated to St Peter (1142) within the Manor of Islingham. Services were held 1330 to 1542 when they were discontinued. The building became an oast house.

In 1279 and again in 1293, 1314 and 1357 the bishop of Rochester claimed liberties in the lands of the priory of Frindsbury as well as all lands belonging to the church. There was more building in the 14th century and around 1407.

=== Modern ===
During the English Reformation, decorations were removed or painted over. Wall paintings of St Lawrence, St Edmund of Canterbury, and St William of Perth were discovered in 1883. The church was extensively restored in 1884, with a large donation from a Mrs Murray, wife to Rev. George Edward Murray, son of a former bishop of Rochester.

Upnor (St Philip and St James) became an independent parish in 1884, but was reabsorbed in 1955.

== Architecture ==
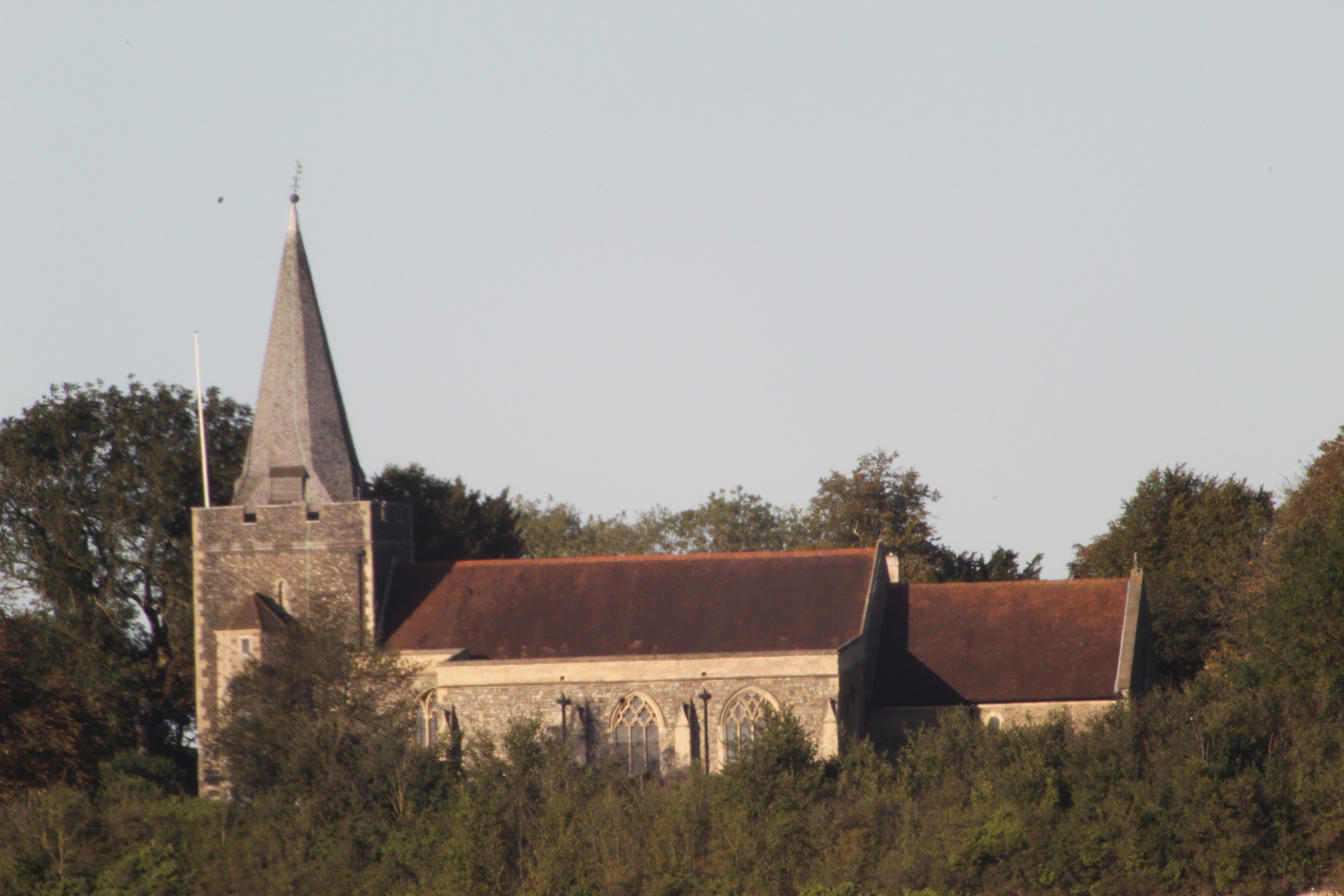
Frindsbury Church seen from Rochester Castle

As a result of quarrying, the church now stands isolated above chalk cliffs, visible from much of the Medway valley. It is surrounded by graveyards. The West Churchyard is managed by Medway Council and the East Churchyard by the PCC.

=== Exterior ===
The church is a composite building of flint and ragstone rubble with ragstone and Caen Stone dressings. Generally the earlier work is flint/ragstone and the later rubble/limestone. The plan is traditional with a rectangular chancel, arch, nave with aisles north and south and west end tower. The chancel, nave and lower parts of the tower are Norman. In the 14th century the tower stair and south aisle were added. The north aisle was added (or possibly rebuilt) in 1884.

The tower is topped by a shingle spire set within the battlements. Fine views are afforded all round, but access is through the bell chamber which is difficult and not open to the public. There are three stages, the lowest being a west end porch, above that the present ringing chamber and above that the bell chamber.

The south aisle extends from the chancel arch back towards the west end, but stops one bay short. It is roofed in metal with a plain parapet. It has the south door, now available for wheelchair access.

The vestry lies to the northeast alongside the chancel. It runs into the north aisle which extends to the west end. Again the roof is of metal.

The nave and chancel roofs are pitched and tiled, the latter with traditional Kent tiles.

==== Tombs ====
A number of tombs in the graveyard are listed buildings in their own right. The Boghurst tomb is a chest tomb of 1750 close to the south door. The listing draws attention to its inscriptions, the urn balusters and notes that it is railed. The Moulding tomb is another chest tomb, this time of 1789. It lies to the east of the church, adjacent to the old (not current) eastern boundary. The inscriptions and urn balusters are noted in the official description. The Miller monument is a good example of a later (early 19 century) sarcophagus monument notable for the "running dog" frieze.

The antiquarian and co-founder of the British Archaeological Association, Charles Roach Smith (1807 – 1890) is buried in the churchyard.

There are a group of 12 headstones listed as a single entry in the official listing. They are all 17th and 18th century, south of the south aisle of the church.

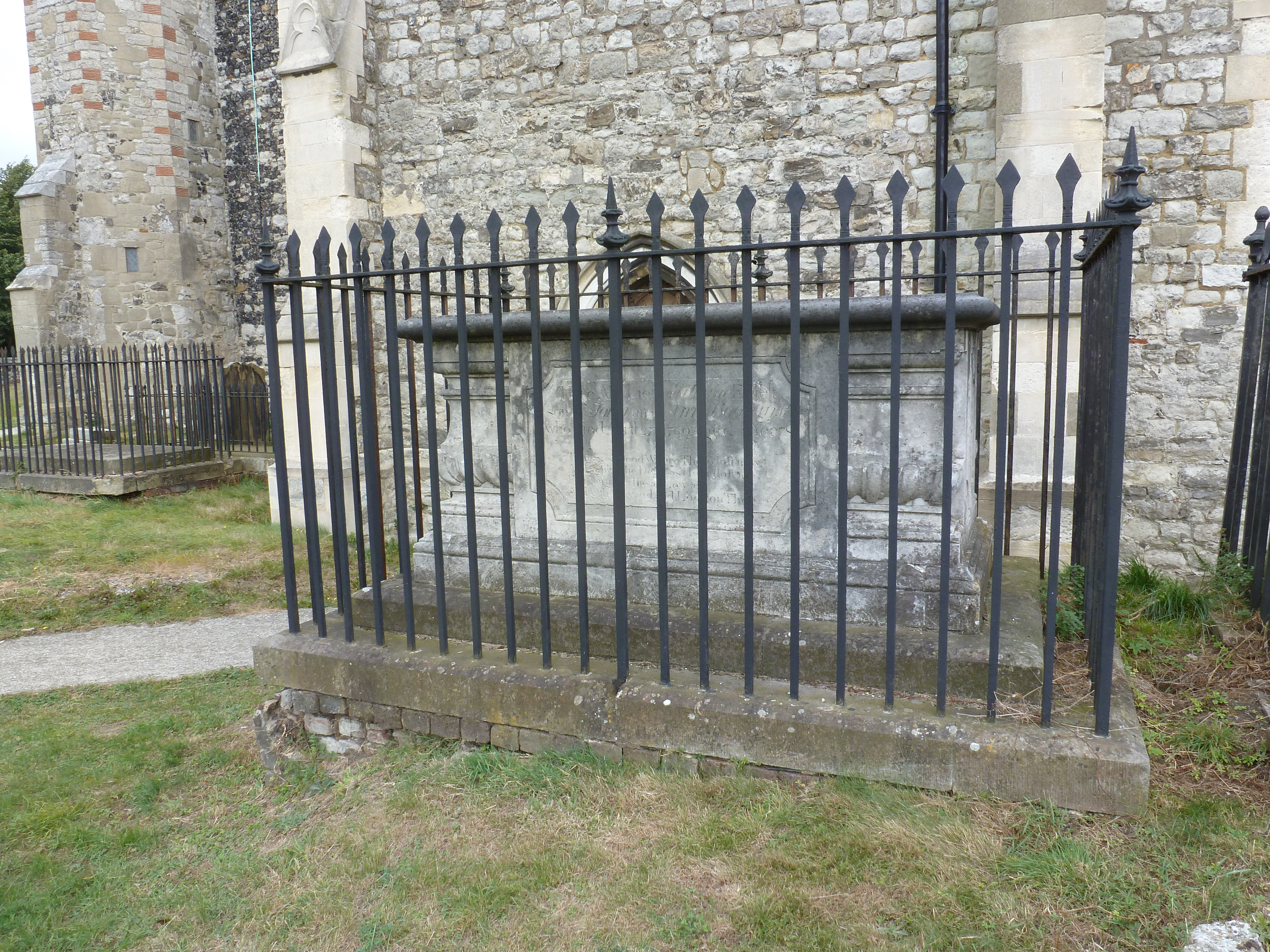
The Boghurst tomb

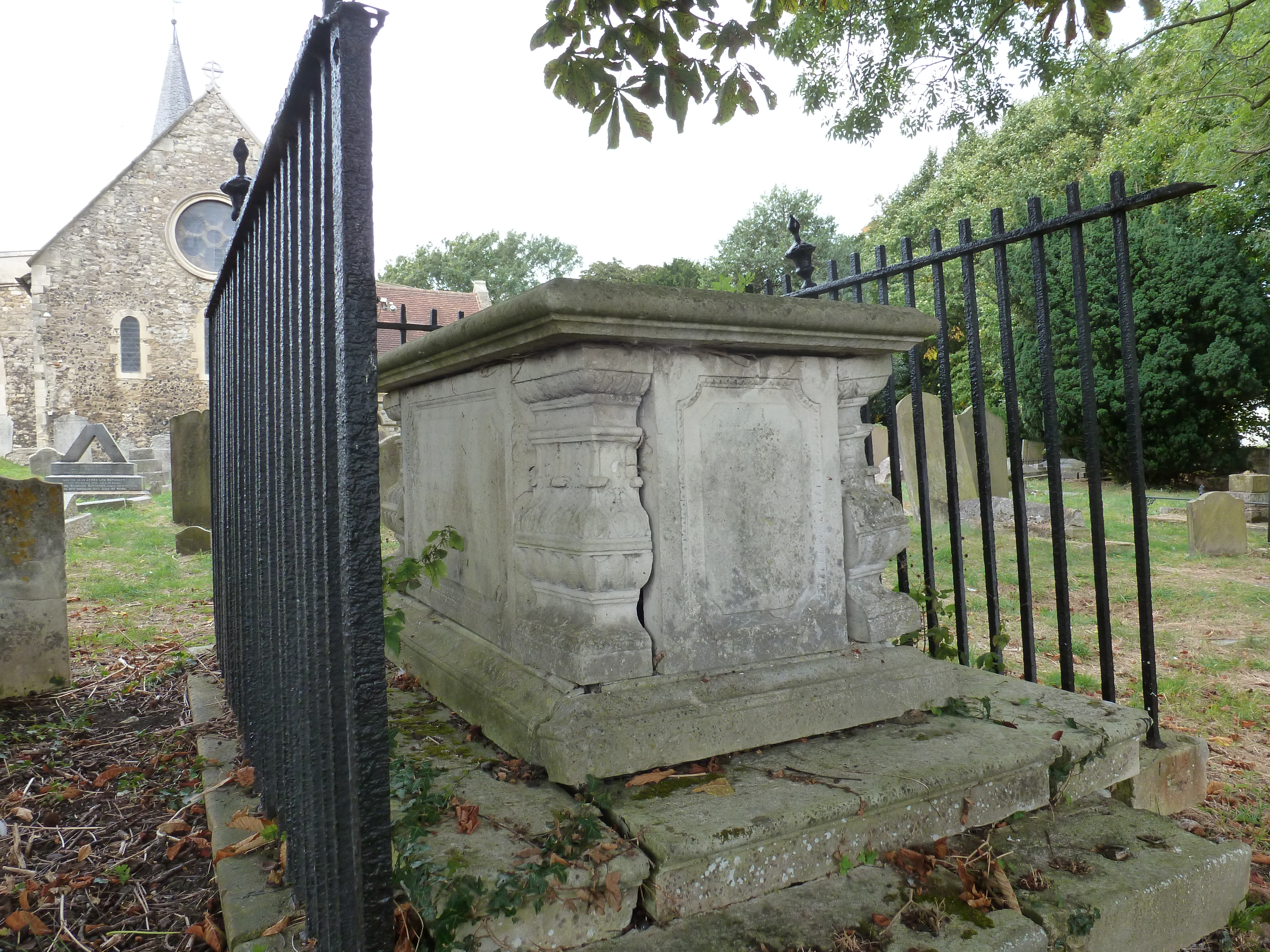
The Moulding tomb

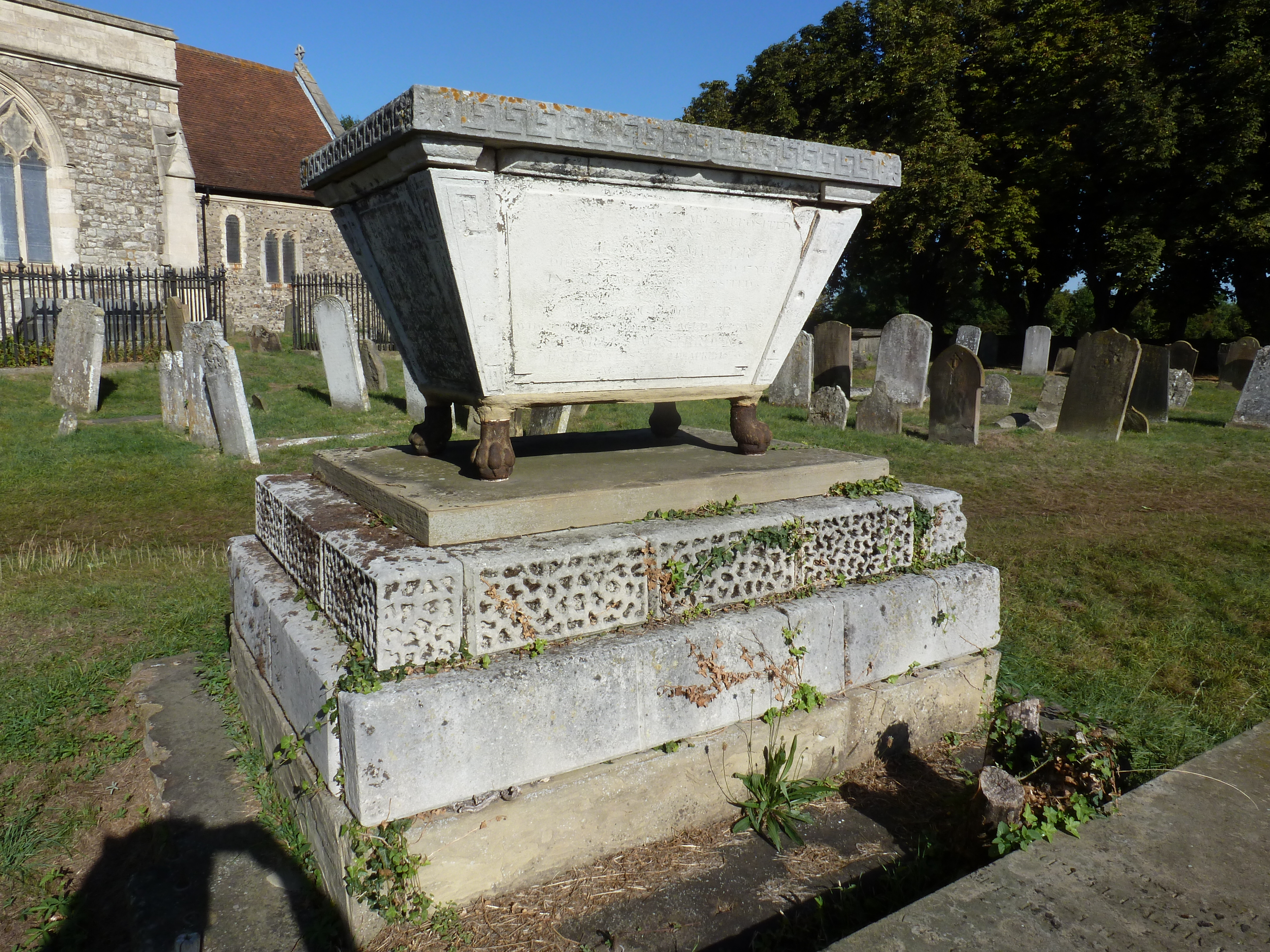
The Miller monument

=== Interior ===
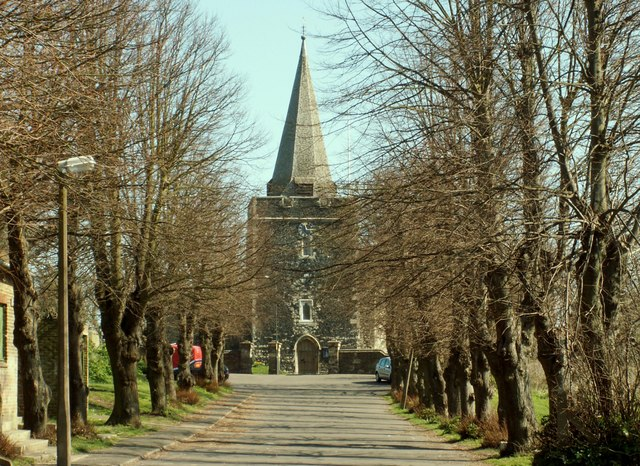
All_Saints, the parish church of Frindsbury – geograph.org.uk – 1232042

The main entrance to the church is through the west end door. The base of the tower has been refurbished with cupboards made from pews removed from the rear of the church. To the right is a small door leading up the tower to the belfry. Many of the tombstones on the floor were translated there from the south aisle or the north wall after 19th-century rebuilding. The tower arch leading to the nave is filled with a glazed oak screen inscribed with the names of the war dead (World War I one side, World War II the other) of the parish.

The nave has been virtually obliterated by the successive building of the arcades to the aisles. Only the westernmost bay of the south wall remains, heavily rebuilt in the 15th century with a modern window. The floor has been tiled and is devoid of monuments. There is now no trace of a rood loft but Henry Larkin's will of 1471 left goods to pay for its maintenance. (Note: "To the marking of the Rode loft in the parish of Frendisbury a quarter of barley") Against the tower wall the Dutch Sanctus bell used to hang (see Bells, below). A modern WC and kitchenette has been installed at the west end of the nave.

The south aisle is separated from the nave by a three bay arcade. The arches are plainly moulded resting upon octagonal piers. The east window is modern, those in the side wall restored in the 15th century. A small piscina in the south wall gives evidence of the site of the Lady chapel. The floor has been raised and tiled so little other trace remains. A 1533 will refers to this: "To be buried in our Lady Chaunsell in the Church of Frennesbury. I give to the said church a cross to stand uppon the herse at buryings and obetts, and at other times uppon our lady aulter". (Note: From the will of Richard Brandribb. Wade is unclear whether "Chaunsell" refers to the chancel or the Lady chapel".) At the west end of the south aisle, adjacent to the south door is the early 15th-century font. It is octagonal on a stone column with a modern wooden cover. There is a notable wall monument of 1621 to Thomas Buttler (see below) immediately behind it.

The north aisle was built in 1883. The organ stood at the east end from 1987 until it was ruined, see below.

The chancel is approached through a 10 feet (3.0 m) wide Norman arch. The squints on either side are modern. Malcolm Thurlby notes that the detailing of parts of the arch date it to around 1130. The chancel roof is in part original (notably the cross beams) but with much of the timberwork renewed. Traces have been found of the original windows in the side walls with surrounding frescos, but they were blocked in when the present Perpendicular windows were inserted. The rose window in the east wall is a reconstruction of the original when the wall was rebuilt. Below are three Norman windows which for many years had been covered by a reredos. When uncovered they here surrounded with medieval frescos, alas now fading. In the south wall there are the remains of a priest's door and a piscina.

==== The Buttler memorial ====
There are two panels, the left hand one reads:

HERE DOTH THOMAS BVTTLER REMAINE
THAT SARVED QVEENE ELYZABETHE ALL HER RAINE
IN INGLAND, FRANCE AND SPANE
IN IRLAND, SCOTLAND WITH THE BEST
AND HEARE IN GRAVE, HIS CORPS DOOTH RESTE:
A.D. 1621;

The right hand one records his two wives, both of whom predeceased him:

DENNIS, THE WIFE OF THOMAS BVTTLER,
WAS BVRIED, THE SECOND DAY OF JANVARY,
ANO.DOM. 1607
MARGARET, THE WIFE OF THOMAS BVTTLER,
WAS BVRED, THE THIRD OF FEBRVARYE
ANO.DOM. 1617

==== Frescos ====
The frescos uncovered in 1883 had practically disappeared by 1990. The remains of one have been preserved, the others have been painted over. Before the frescos were covered over, a small copy of them was made which hangs on the south wall of the chancel.

The window in the north wall has St. Leonard in the left jamb and St. Edmund of Pontigny in the right. (Note: Hope is quoted by Wade.) St Edmund was Archbishop of Canterbury 1234–40, this is the only known mural of him. There were altars to St. Edmund in the crypts of Rochester and Canterbury.

The window in the south wall has on the left a capped and nimbed (haloed) female, otherwise unidentified, that to the right an unnimbed bishop. Both were very faded at the time of their discovery.

The east wall lights are in part missing. Of the northern one only half remains with St. Laurence in the jamb. (Note: Hope describes the figure as "perfect".) The central light is entirely missing and that to the south is two-fifths lost. The left hand jamb has a nimbed woman with pink underdress and slate blue robe. Hope supposes this to be St. Mary Magdalene. The right hand jamb has an unnimbed pilgrim. Hope believes the figures date from 1256 when Bishop de St. Laurence Martin obtained a grant of land for Frindsbury from Rochester priory and the same year in which St. William of Perth was canonised. The right hand figure may well therefore be St. William, in which case it is also the only known mural of him.

== Music ==
=== Organ ===
The earliest photographic evidence of an organ shows it situated in a loft above the main entrance. A new organ was built in 1889 by Forster and Andrews and placed behind the choir stalls on the north of the chancel. In 1987 the organ was moved into the north aisle and extended. It was ruined in 2008 by rain water following the theft of metal from the roof. It was subsequently sold to a private collector. Music is provided now by an electric organ and by an enthusiastic group drawn from the younger members of the church.

=== Bells ===
The ringing chamber is reached by the 15th-century spiral staircase from the ground floor of the tower. The room contains the church clock, installed in 1911 as a memorial to the family of John Rose. The ringing chamber was probably the medieval priests' lodgings, and as such has the typical window giving a view of the chancel. A wooden ladder leads up to the bell chamber.

There is a ring of eight bells (tenor 15 long cwt 2 qr 4 lb; 1,740 lb or 789 kg in F) hung in the English style for full circle ringing. The earliest recorded date is on the number 6 bell which was originally cast in 1260. In 1584 what is now the number 7 was cast. The current service bell was cast in 1637 as the treble of five. The following year the tenor was cast by John Wilnar. In 1656 the then second (now 5th) was recast by John Darbie. This was the ring "of five bells and a small one" recorded by Hasted in 1797. In 1865 the tenor was recast.

In 1670 a Dutch founder, Gerritt Schimmel, cast what became for a while the sanctus bell. It hung on the west wall of the nave until the 1980s. Love records it as having been sold, Wade claims it was stolen in 1982.

In 1920 the old second and third (now 5 and 6) were recast by Alfred Bowell and three new trebles supplied to augment the ring to the present eight. In 1923 Bowell recast the back two bells. In 2000 the only remaining pre 20th-century bell, the 1637 number four was found to be of poor tone. As part of a refurbishment sponsored by the Millennium Commission it was hung dead as the service bell and a new fourth ("Carole") was cast by John Taylor & Co.

== See also ==
- List of ecclesiastical restorations and alterations by J. L. Pearson
- Listed buildings in Frindsbury
