= William Pendrill =

17th-century English royalist

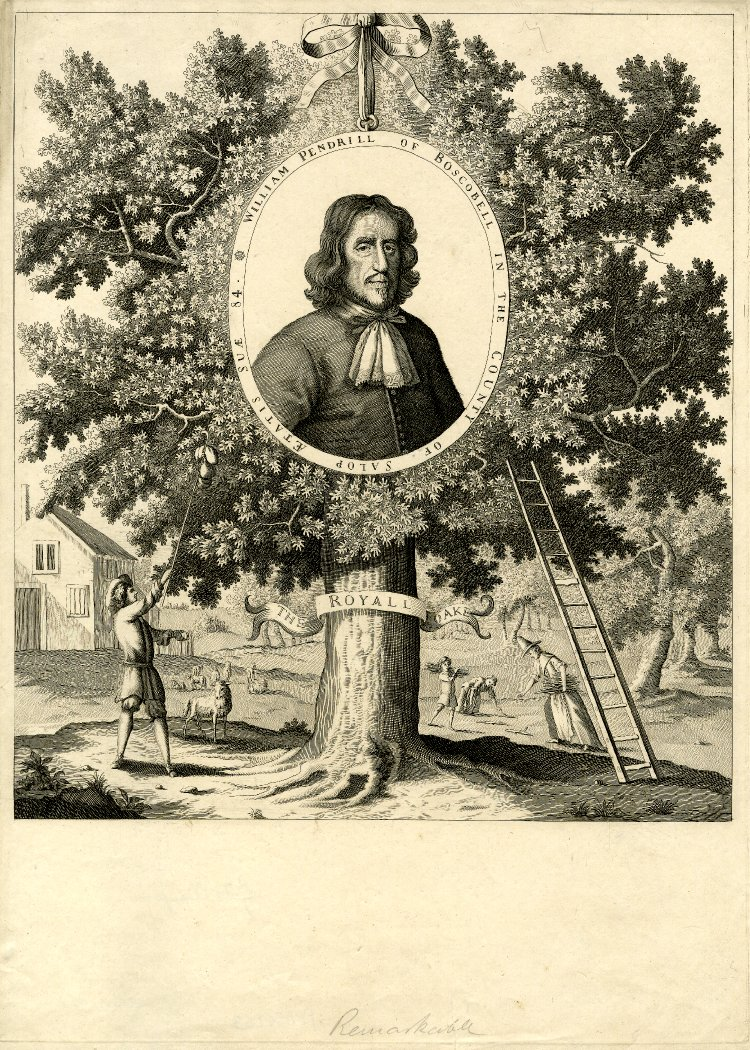
William Pendrill and the Royal Oak

William Pendrill (died 1705) was a Roman Catholic and royalist in the English Civil War.

Pendrill and his five brothers were the occupants of Boscobel House in Shropshire where in 1651 they secreted the defeated King Charles II in an oak tree after the Battle of Worcester. The tree became known as the Royal Oak.

He is remembered in the Penderel's Oak public house in London's High Holborn.
