= Boscobel, Shropshire =

Civil parish in Shropshire, England

Coordinates: 52.671°N 2.243°W

Boscobel
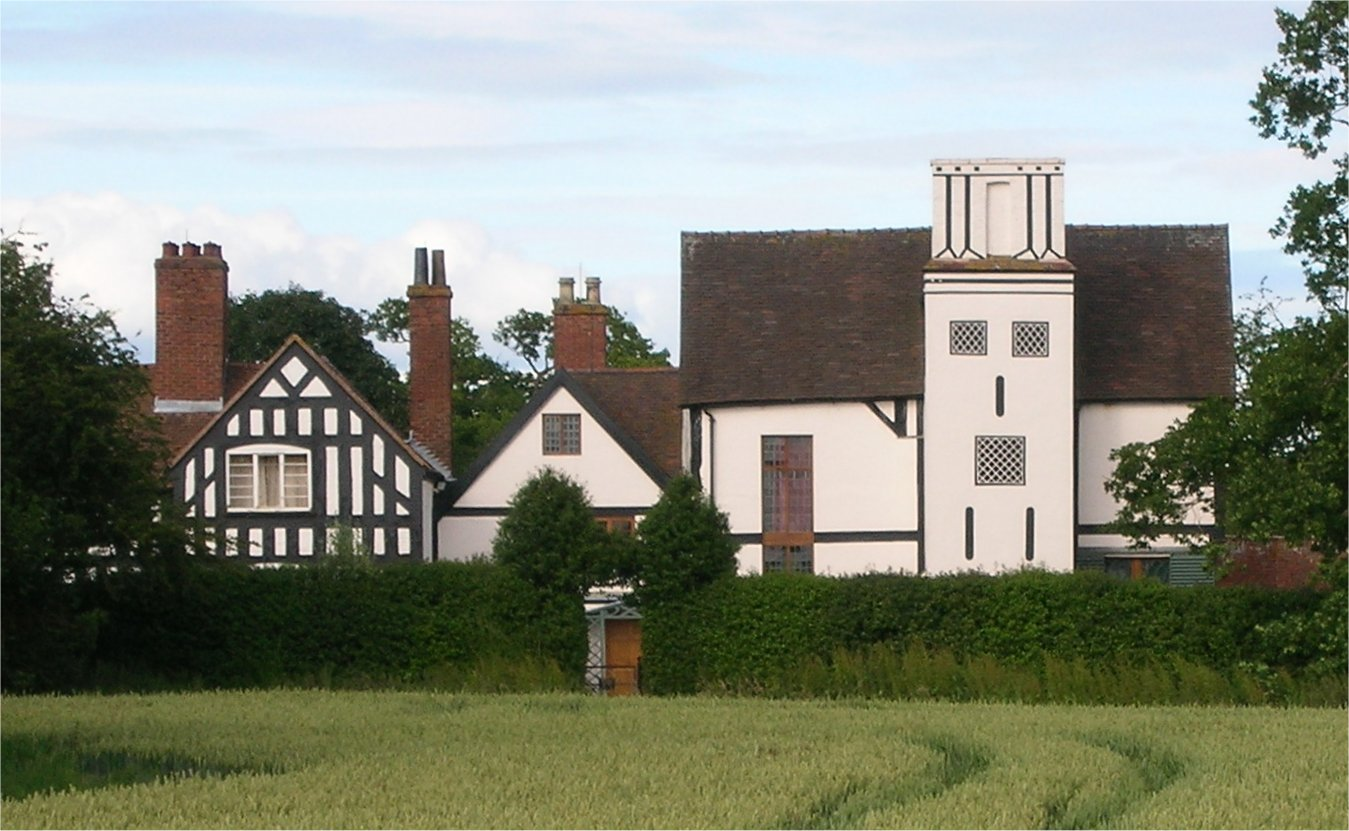
- Boscobel House

- Location within Shropshire
- Population: 12 (2001 census)
- OS grid reference: SJ835082
- Civil parish: Albrighton and Donington
- Unitary authority: Shropshire
- Ceremonial county: Shropshire
- Region: West Midlands
- Country: England
- Sovereign state: United Kingdom
- Post town: STAFFORD
- Postcode district: ST19
- Dialling code: 01902; 01785
- Police: West Mercia
- Fire: Shropshire
- Ambulance: West Midlands
- UK Parliament: The Wrekin; Stafford

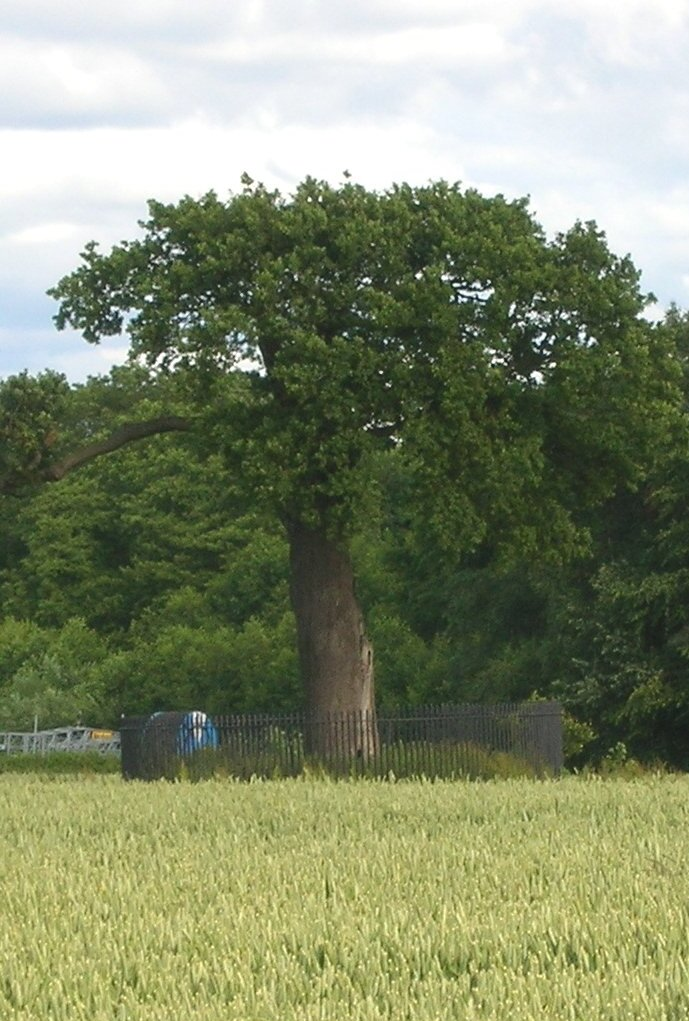
A descendant of the Royal Oak at Boscobel House

Boscobel was a civil parish in the east of Shropshire, England, on the border with Staffordshire. To the north is the Staffordshire village of Bishops Wood.

According to the 2001 census it had a population of 12. Because of its small population, it shared a parish council with the neighbouring Donington parish. At the time of abolition it was the smallest parish in Shropshire by population – the smallest by area is Deuxhill.

== History ==
Boscobel was formerly an extra-parochial tract, in 1858 it became a civil parish, on 1 April 2025 the parish was abolished and merged with Albrighton and Donington to form "Albrighton and Donington".

== Boscobel House ==
It is the site of Boscobel House, home to the Giffard family, owners of the Boscobel Royal Oak, where Charles II hid in an oak tree after losing the Battle of Worcester in 1651.

A historical romance on the subject was published as Boscobel in 1872 by William Harrison Ainsworth.

The "pine groves of Boscobel" are mentioned (twice) by Charles Kinbote, narrator of Vladimir Nabokov's 1962 postmodern novel Pale Fire, in descriptions of his escape from Zembla.

== White Ladies Priory ==
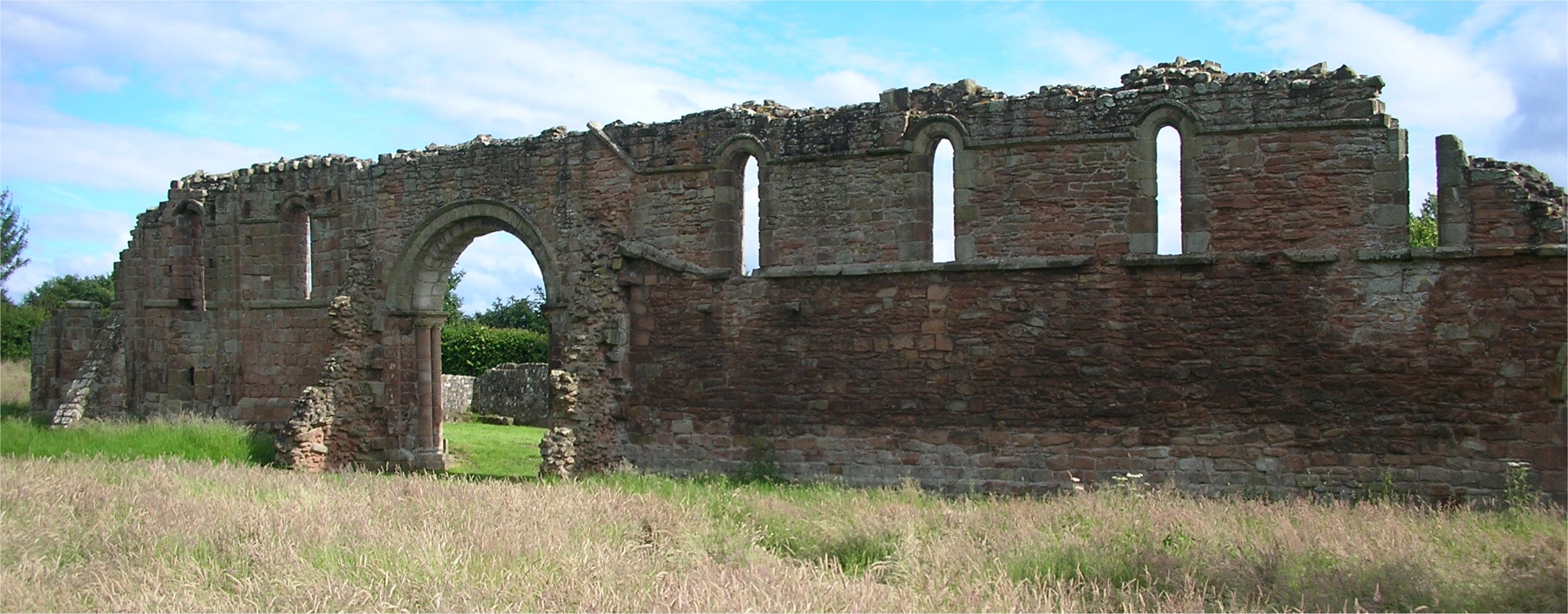
The ruins of White Ladies Priory

Also in the parish is White Ladies Priory.

== See also ==
- Escape of Charles II
- Listed buildings in Boscobel
