= Listed buildings in Boscobel =

Boscobel was a civil parish in Shropshire, England. It contained six listed buildings that are recorded in the National Heritage List for England. Of these, one is listed at Grade II*, the middle of the three grades, and the others are at Grade II, the lowest grade. The parish did not contain a significant settlement, and its major building is Boscobel House. This is listed, and all the other listed buildings in the parish are associated with it.

== Key ==
Grade	Criteria
II*	Particularly important buildings of more than special interest
II	Buildings of national importance and special interest

== Buildings ==
Name and location	Photograph	Date	Notes	Grade
Boscobel House; 52.67168°N 2.24179°W		16th century	Originally a farmhouse, it was converted into a hunting lodge in the early 17th century. It is notable as the house in which Charles II took refuge for two nights in 1651 following the Battle of Worcester. The house was remodelled in the early 19th century. It was originally timber framed and has since been rendered, extensions added in brick, and it has tiled roofs. There are two storeys, an attic, and a cellar, a three-bay range and a lower cross-wing, with an angle turret. Most of the windows are casements. The house and its ground are a Scheduled Monument.	II*
Barn, Boscobel House; 52.67191°N 2.24217°W	—	17th century	The barn is timber framed with red brick infill on a stone plinth and has a tile roof. It has a rectangular plan and five bays. To the southwest is a 19th-century extension that formerly contained machinery and an engine.	II
Garden wall, Boscobel House; 52.67145°N 2.24124°W	—	Late 18th or early 19th century	The garden wall is in red brick, it is about 45 metres (148 ft) long and 3.5 metres (11 ft) high. The wall is angled near the northwest end, and ramped down at the southeast end.	II
Railings and commemorative plates, Royal Oak; 52.67005°N 2.24185°W		1817	The cast iron railings are on a stone plinth and form a circular enclosure surrounding a tree, thought to be a descendant of the tree in which Charles II hid in 1651 following the Battle of Worcester. Inside the enclosure are three commemorative brass plates on cast iron brackets recording the history.	II
Farm buildings, Boscobel House; 52.67181°N 2.24146°W	—	Early to mid-19th century	The farm buildings to the northeast of the house are in red brick with tiled roofs. They include an implement shed, a stable, a dovecote and a smithy, and form an irregular line of buildings.	II
Stable and granary, Boscobel House; 52.67175°N 2.24197°W	—	Early to mid-19th century	The stable and granary are in red brick with a tiled roof. The main block has two storeys with external steps leading up to the granary. On the northwest side are two gables containing lunette openings.	II
