= Boscobel House =

Building in Boscobel, Shropshire, England

Coordinates: 52°40′18″N 2°14′30″W

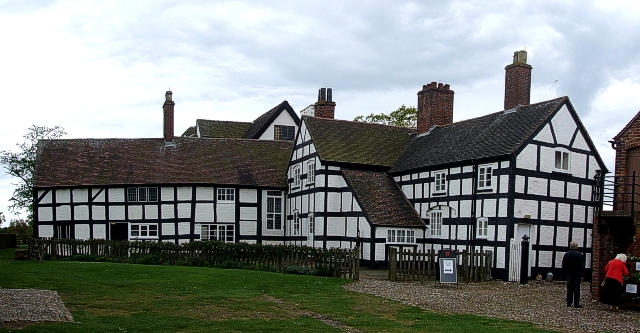
Boscobel House

Boscobel House (grid reference SJ837082) is a Grade II* listed building in the parish of Boscobel in Shropshire. It has been, at various times, a farmhouse, a hunting lodge, and a holiday home; but it is most famous for its role in the escape of Charles II after the Battle of Worcester in 1651. Today it is managed by English Heritage.

== Location ==
The building is just inside Shropshire, as is clear from all Ordnance Survey maps of the area, although part of the property boundary is contiguous with the Shropshire – Staffordshire border, and it has a Stafford post code. Boscobel is on land which belonged to White Ladies Priory in the Middle Ages, and at that time it was extra-parochial. The priory was often described as being at Brewood, which is in Staffordshire, and this may have contributed to the widespread belief that the house and priory are in Staffordshire. Brewood is the neighbouring parish, and the house is just south of the small village of Bishops Wood, a constituent part of Brewood. Although technically still a separate civil parish, Boscobel's small population means it has shared a parish council with Donington, Shropshire, which in 2025 was enlarged to form the combined civil parish of "Abrighton and Donington". Local government reform in 1974 brought the parish, including Boscobel House and White Ladies, into Bridgnorth District, which in 2009 was superseded by the new unitary authority of Shropshire Council. The nearest city is Wolverhampton. The house is just north of the M54 Motorway.

== History ==
=== Origins ===
Boscobel House was created around 1632, when landowner John Giffard of White Ladies Priory converted a timber-framed farmhouse, built some time in the 16th century on the lands of White Ladies Priory, into a hunting lodge.

The priory and its estate, including the farmhouse site, had been leased from the Crown by William Skeffington of Wolverhampton at the Dissolution of the Monasteries about a century earlier. It passed into the Giffard family because Skeffington left it to his widow, Joan, and she subsequently married Edward Giffard, son of Sir Thomas Giffard of Chillington (died 1560) and grandson of Sir John Giffard (died 1556) of Chillington Hall. The reversion was sold to William Whorwood in 1540, which made him the effective owner, but one of the early lessees must have paid off Whorwood, because it was later passed on to Edward Giffard's heir, John.

John Giffard decided to make the farmhouse more useful by building a substantial extension to the south, including a living room and bedrooms more fitted to use by a gentry family. Giffard called the new hunting lodge Boscobel House. Thomas Blount (writing 1660), the main source for the events, portrays the naming as an after-dinner activity, and attributes it to Sir Basil Brook(e), a prominent recusant from Madeley, Shropshire, who was one of Giffard's guests at the housewarming party. Boscobel is believed to come from the Italian phrase bosco bello meaning "in the midst of fair woods": in 1632, Boscobel House was surrounded by dense woodlands. Also, the many branches of the Giffard family all claim ancestry from the lords of Bolbec or Bolebec and Longueville in Upper Normandy: Osbern de Bolebec became lord of Longueville in the early 11th century and his sons, Osbern Giffard and Gautier or Walter Giffard of Bolbec, were companions of William the Conqueror.

=== Recusancy and the escape of Charles II ===
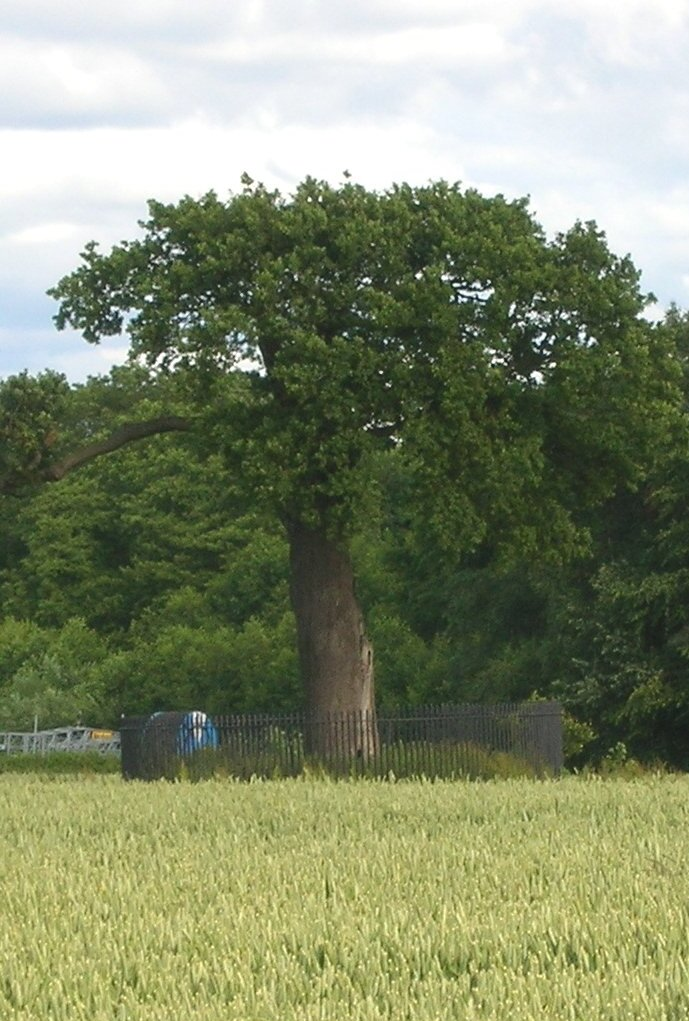
A descendant of the Royal Oak at Boscobel House

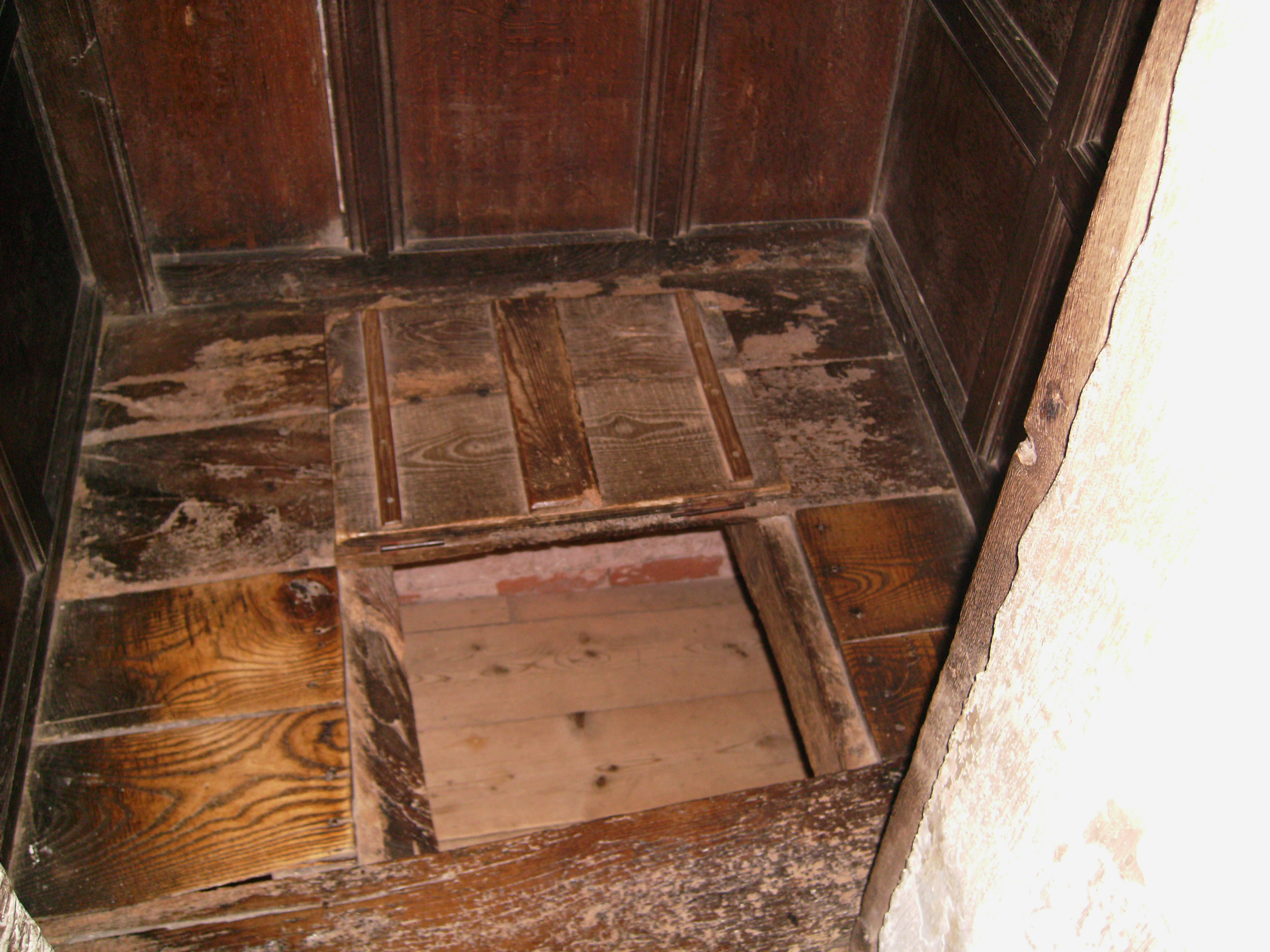
Alleged priest hole on the first floor of Boscobel House, at present in a bedroom cupboard. Its authenticity is open to challenge.

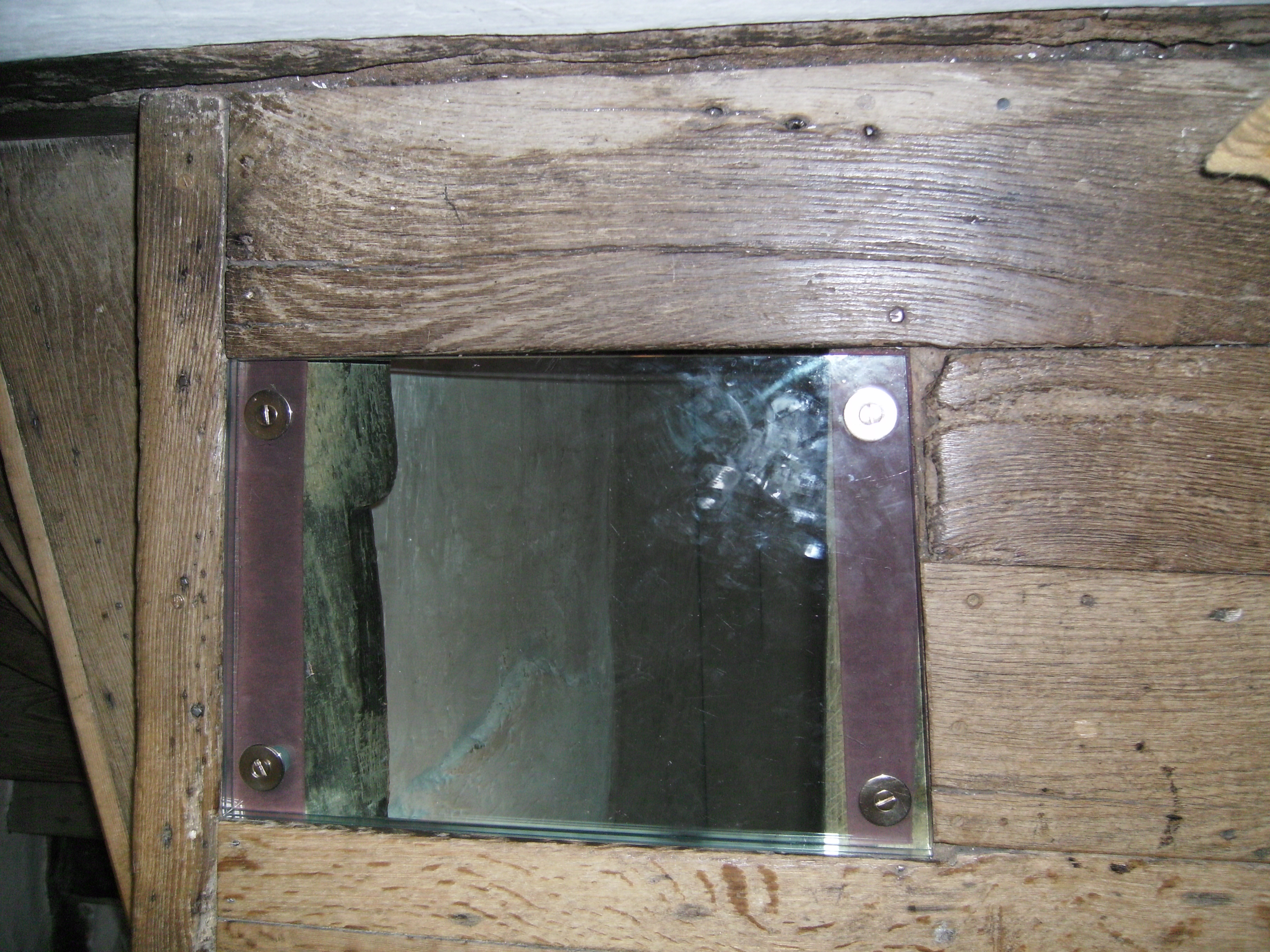
Priest hole on the second floor. At present it is at the top of a staircase, but the stairs were a few feet to the left in the 17th century.

The Giffard family were recusants – Catholics who refused to participate in the worship of the established Church of England. For them, this brought fines, imprisonment and discrimination; for priests it could mean barbarous execution. The Giffards took care to surround themselves with reliable retainers; until the mid-19th century, after Catholic Emancipation, their servants and tenants were mainly Catholic. The house itself served as a secret place for the shelter of Catholic priests, with at least one priest-hole. This secret purpose of the house was to play a key part in the history of the country. By 1651, when Boscobel played host to Charles II, it was owned by John Giffard's heir, his daughter, Frances Cotton. Frances had married John Cotton, a Huntingdonshire squire, in 1633, but was a widow by this time. She was not resident at the time of the events that made Boscobel House one of the most evocative sites in the English royalist imagination. It was here that Charles II hid in a tree to escape discovery by Parliamentary soldiers during his escape after the Battle of Worcester.

Initially, Charles was led to White Ladies Priory by Charles Giffard, a cousin of the owner, and his servant Francis Yates, the only man subsequently executed for his part in the escape. There, the Penderel family, tenants and servants of the Giffard family, began to play important roles in guiding and caring for him. From White Ladies, Richard Penderel led Charles in an unsuccessful attempt to cross the Severn near Madeley, Shropshire. They were forced to retrace their steps and Charles took refuge at Boscobel, where he was met by Colonel William Careless, whose brother rented land from the Giffards at Broom Hall, Brewood. Careless and the King spent all day hiding in a nearby oak tree (which became known as The Royal Oak), from where he could see the patrols searching for him. Later Charles spent the night hiding in one of Boscobel's priest holes. He was moved from Boscobel to Moseley Old Hall, another Catholic redoubt near Wolverhampton, and ultimately escaped the region posing as the servant of Jane Lane of Bentley, whose family were also landowners at Broom Hall and at the Hyde in Brewood. The Lanes, although friends and business partners of the Giffards, were not recusants but of Puritan sympathies and Jane's brother, Colonel John Lane, had taken Parliament's side in fighting around Wolverhampton during the Civil War.

=== Subsequent history ===
Frances Cotton, née Giffard, died shortly after these events, and both White Ladies and Boscobel passed via her daughter, Jane Cotton, who had married Basil Fitzherbert in 1648, to the Fitzherbert family of Norbury Hall, Derbyshire. The Fitzherberts were major landowners and let Boscobel as a farm to a succession of tenants, including several members of the Penderel family. Boscobel featured prominently in the Popish Plot: the informer Stephen Dugdale accused the guests who witnessed the Jesuit John Gavan taking his final vows there in 1678 of plotting treason, and several of them, including Gavan himself, were executed or imprisoned. The estate and Boscobel were sold to Walter Evans, a Derbyshire industrialist, in 1812, although the Fitzherbert family retained the White Ladies Priory site. It was the Evans family who restored the house and gardens, often in fanciful ways, and nourished the legend of Charles II. A substantial farm building was appended to the northern side of the house in the 19th century, giving the present house three distinct wings. It was sold to Orlando Bridgeman, 5th Earl of Bradford in 1918, who placed both it and the tree in the hands of the Ministry of Works in 1954. It passed via the Department of the Environment to English Heritage in 1984.

== Boscobel House today ==
=== House ===
The three stages of building are readily apparent to the modern visitor. The 16th-century farm is clearly central and is easily distinguished from the 19th-century farm which adjoins it at right angles. The latter is brick-built but painted black and white to simulate timber framing. The main house, built by John Giffard around 1632, is mainly hidden behind the earlier and later structures on first approach. It is timber-framed, part brick, but covered in stucco, which was applied in the 18th century to cover up faults in the structure and materials. Its east and west ends are marked respectively by the bowed structure, probably originally housing the staircase, and the chimney stack.

The tripartite structure: styles and materials

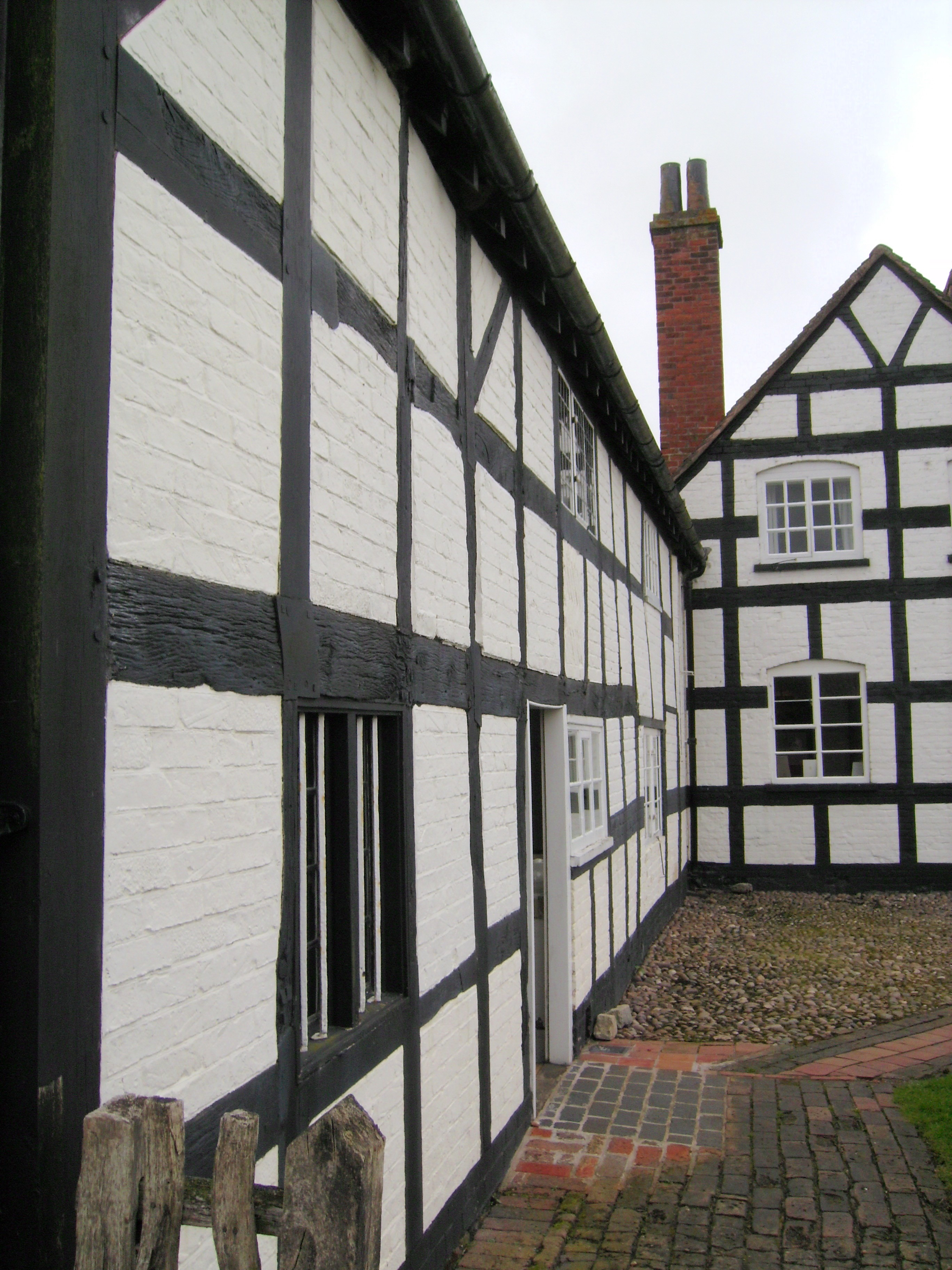
Frontage of the 16th-century farm, adjoining the 19th-century structure, seen in the background. The older building is genuinely timber framed, although the outer skin has been replaced with brick.

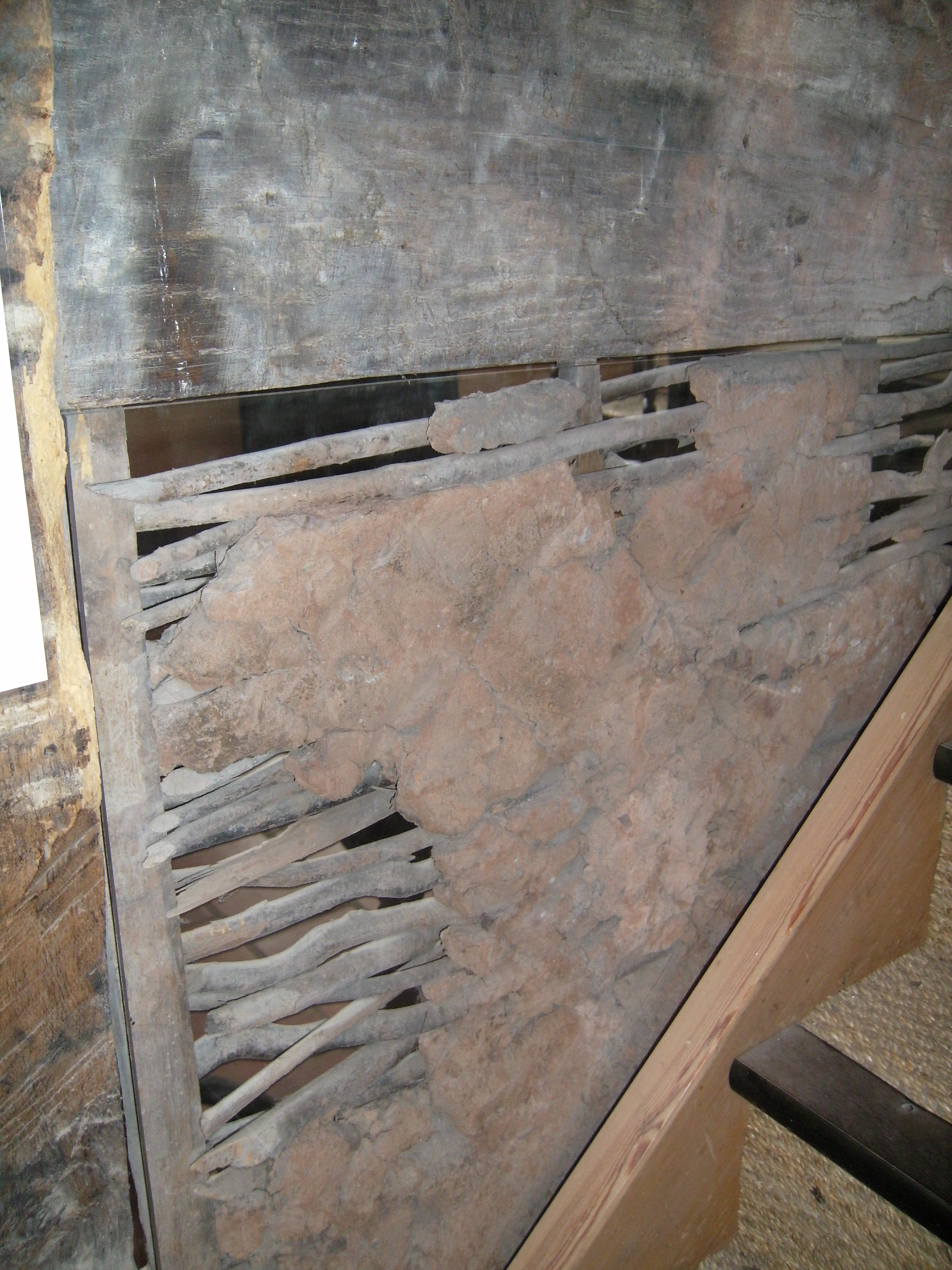
The wattle and daub construction of the 16th-century building, still exposed where it is partitioned between the dairy and entrance hall.

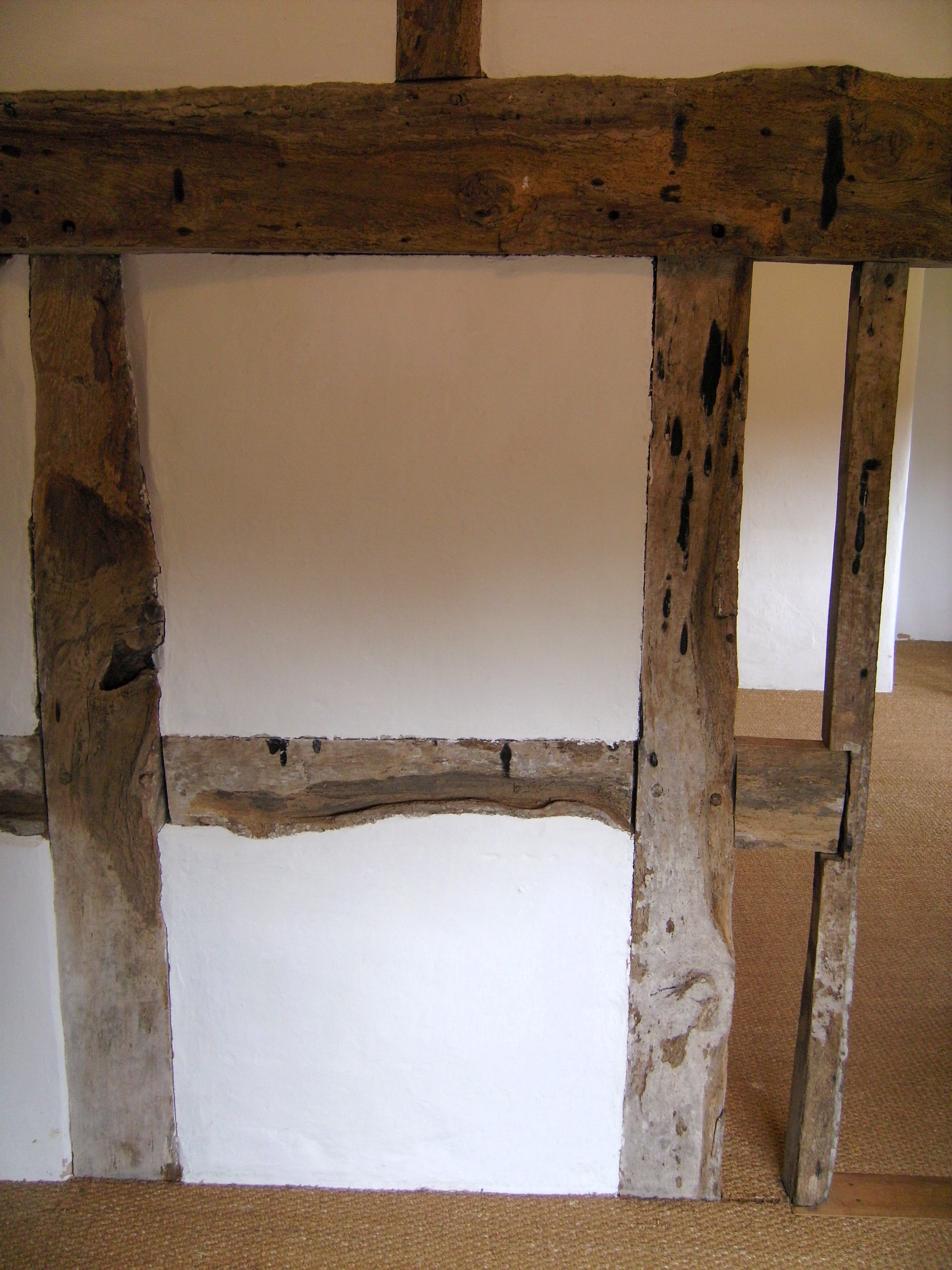
Internal oak timbers, much perforated by woodworm, on the first floor of the 16th-century farm building.

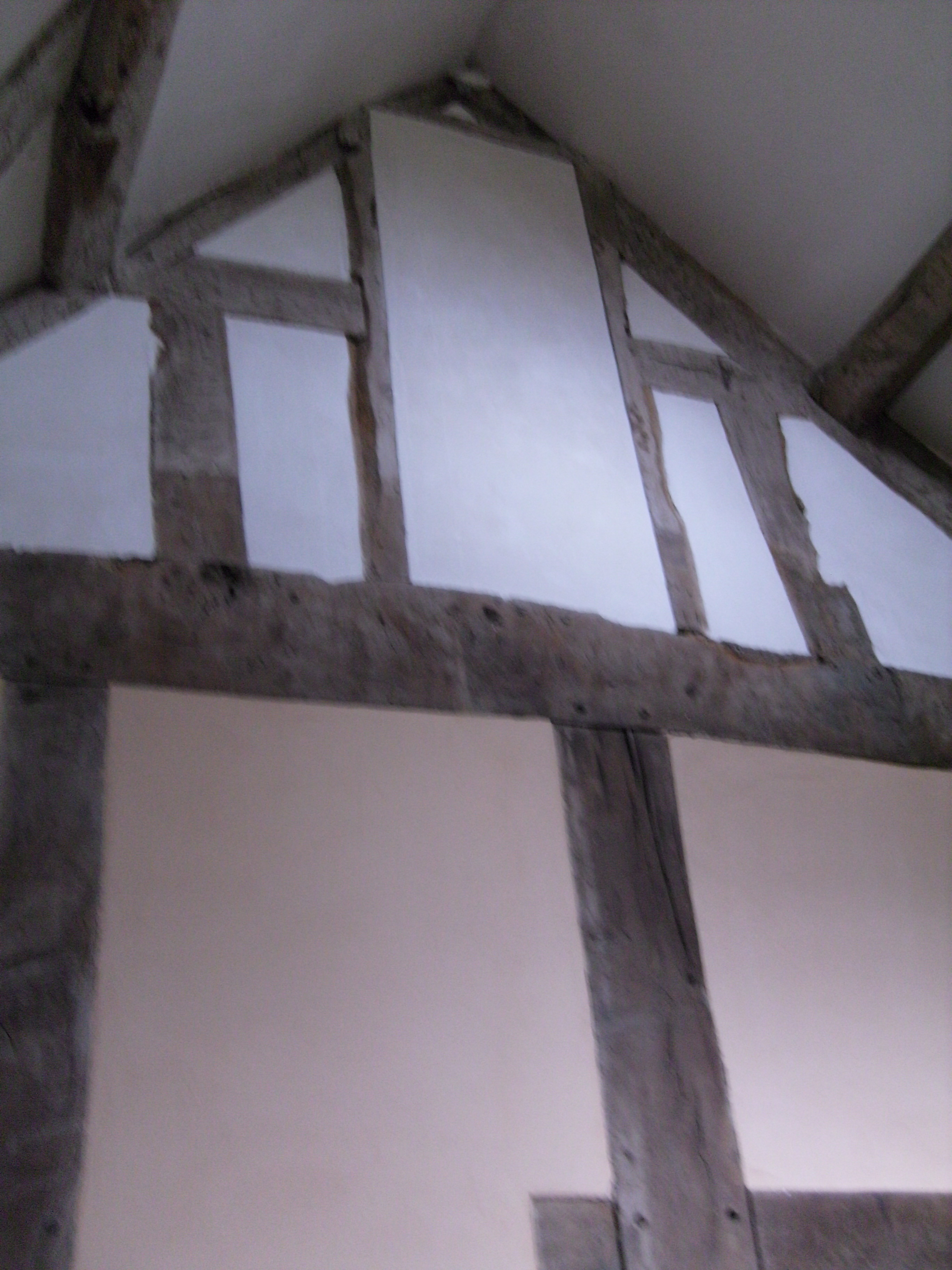
16th-century timber framing seen inside the entrance hall, formerly part of an undivided 16th-century hall.

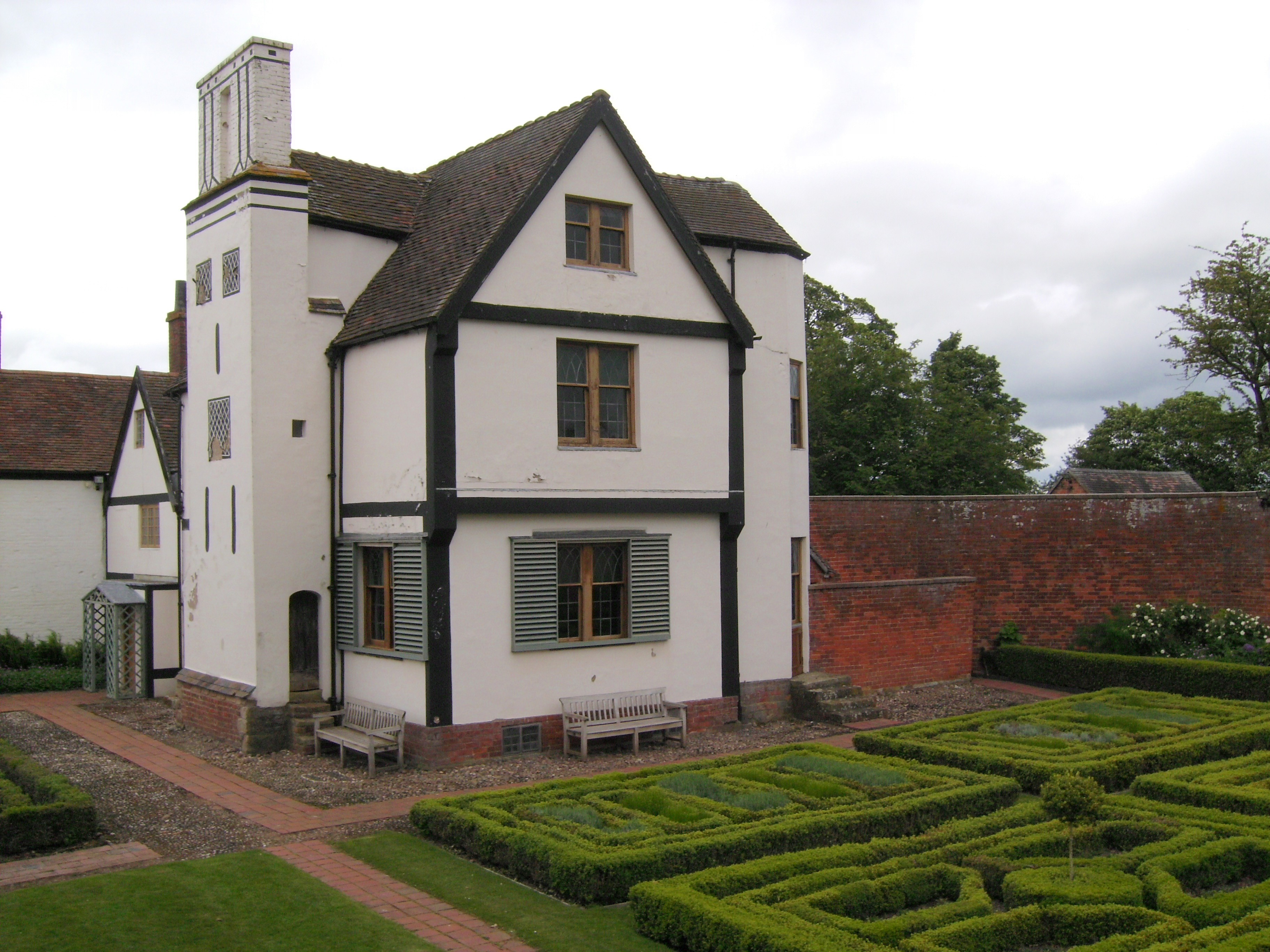
The hunting lodge, framed by its own chimney stack and stairway.

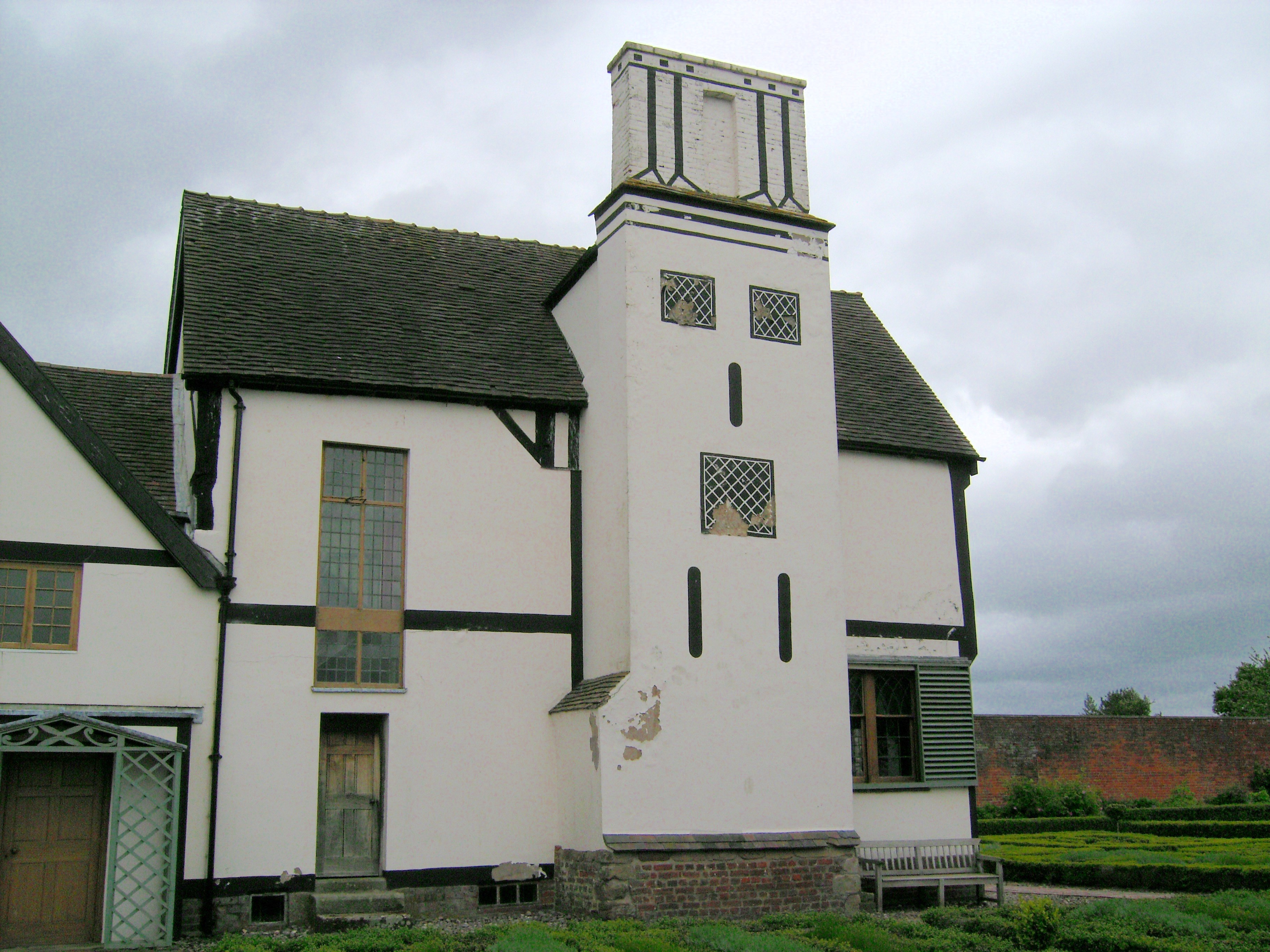
The hunting lodge from the west. The stucco that covered the original patchwork of brick and daub has false windows painted on.

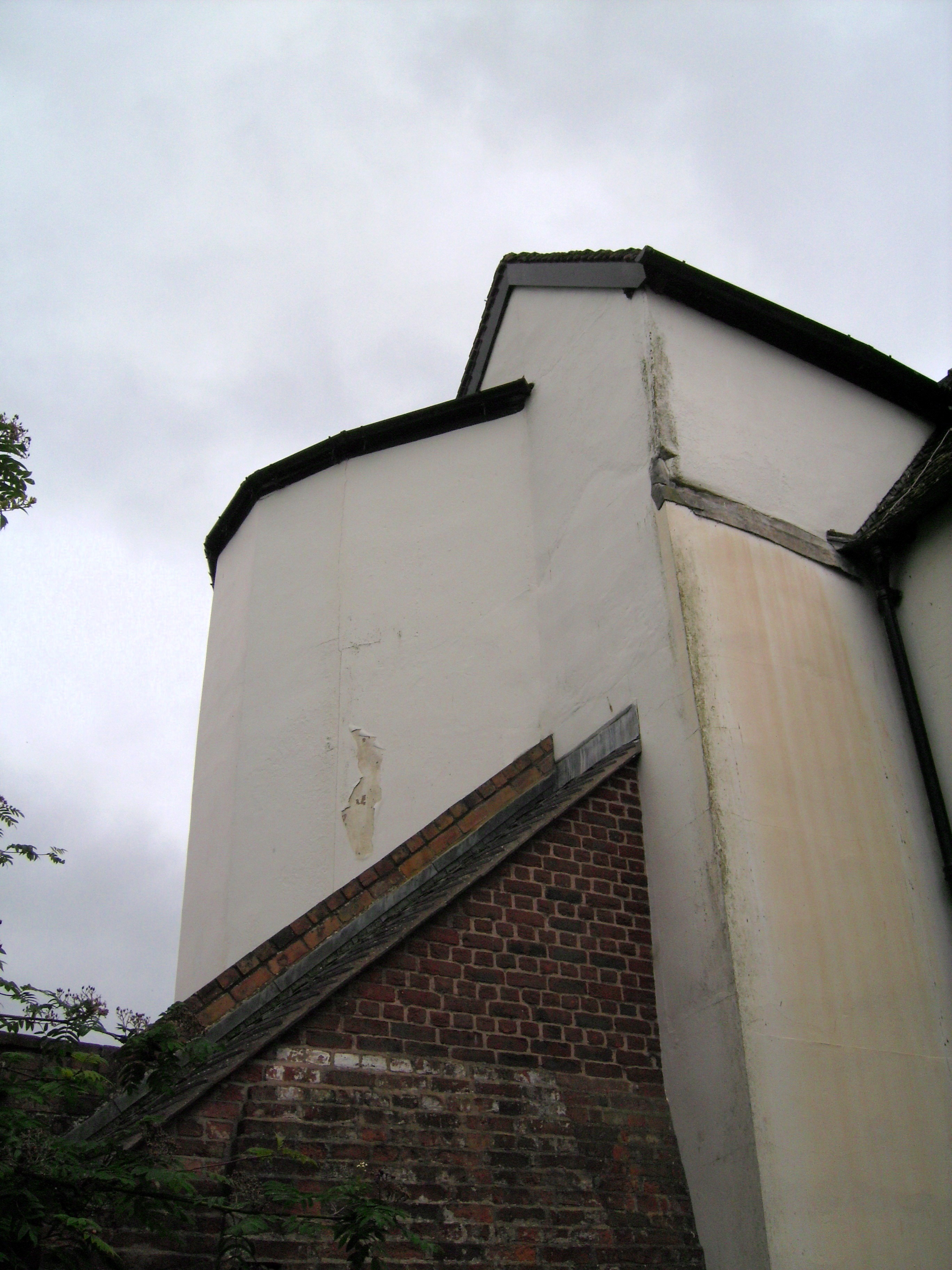
The stuccoed "turret" of the hunting lodge, actually a former stairwell that was turned into living and sleeping rooms by the 19th-century modification.

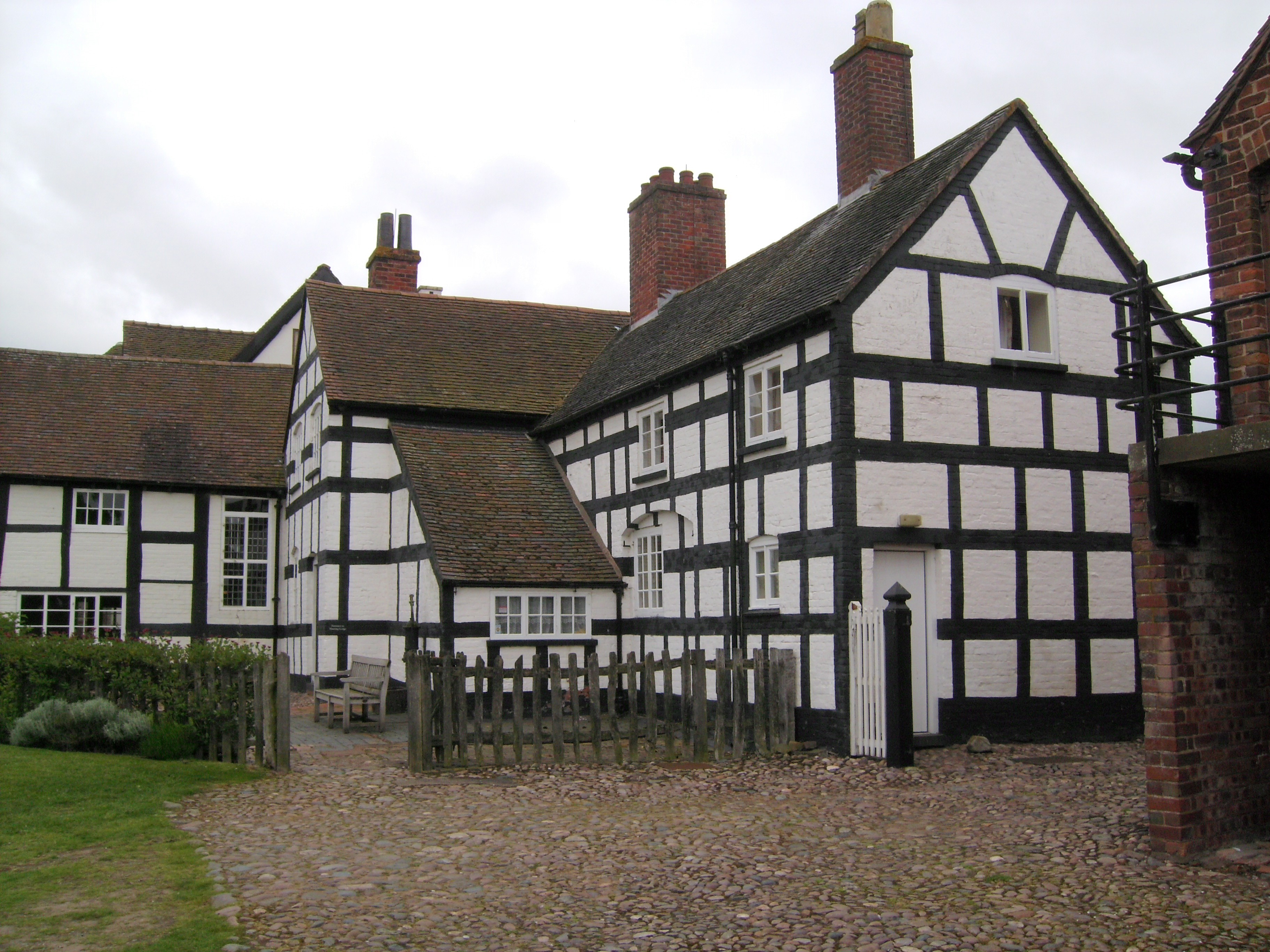
The 19th-century farm building, painted in mock-Tudor style. This later building dominates the site from the farmyard and strikes the visitor first.

The 19th-century farm today houses an introductory display, covering the escape of Charles II and the history of Boscobel. The 16th-century farm, known as the north range, houses an exhibition of dairy equipment, focussing on the butter and cheese making that were important here in the Victorian period. In 2011, the upper floor was opened to the public for the first time, allowing a much better appreciation of the construction and clearly showing the differing woodwork, indicating that the building was much altered even before John Giffard's additions.

The western end of the north range is now separated off to provide the entrance hall and stairs for the main house, a change apparently made by the Evans family in the 19th century. The ground floor of John Giffard's development is occupied largely by the Parlour, much-altered but containing a good deal of Jacobean panelling. The Victorian fireplace is surmounted by three black marble panels, each engraved to illustrate aspects of Charles' escape – two of them designed by a daughter of Walter Evans. Through the Parlour is the so-called Oratory, presented by the Evans family as a small prayer room, but probably where the 17th-century stairs were housed. This contains a portrait of Jane Penderel, known as Dame Joan, the matriarch of the family to whom Charles owed so much, and a chest, dated 1642, which appears to be mainly 19th-century work.

On the first floor of the main house is a bedroom known as the Squire's Room. Between a fireplace and the bed is a door into a closet, which has a trapdoor into a small "secret place", alleged to be a priest's hole. However, the space appears to be both too small and too obvious, as chimney areas were known to make good hiding places. This floor also contains another bedroom, known as the White Room. Originally, the entire first floor was probably a single large room; in the 17th century large bedrooms were used socially, while the Victorians developed the modern notion of the bedroom as a private space.

The second floor is a large attic, divided into two spaces today. In the first, at the very top of the stairs, is a trapdoor opening into a more convincing priest hole. This is where Charles II is thought to have spent an uncomfortable night, as it is only 4 feet (1.2m) in height while he was very tall for the time, around 6 ft 2in (1.85m). Beyond this attic space is the Bower Room, used as a bedroom in the 19th century.

The interior: a 19th-century re-creation

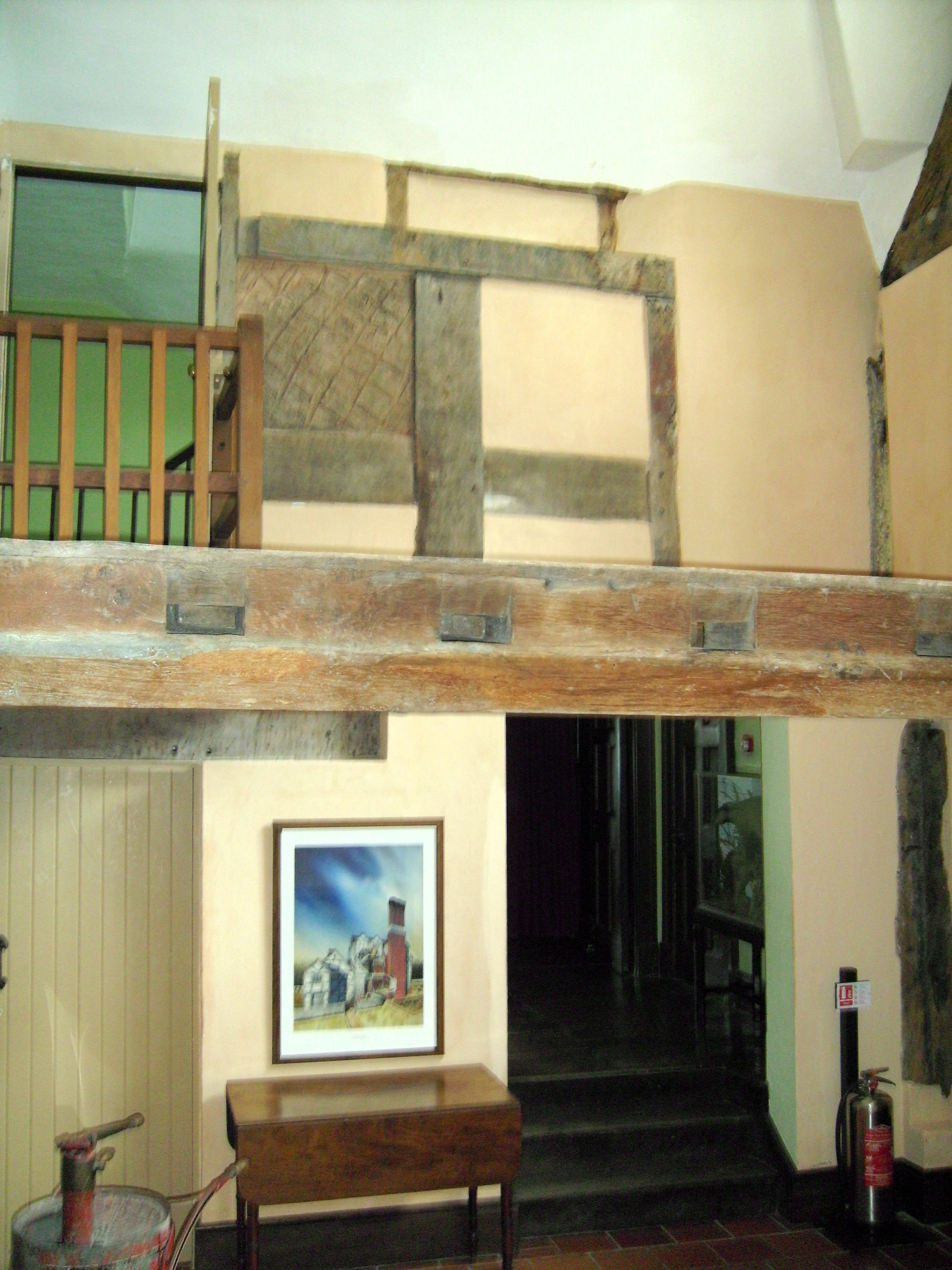
The Entrance Hall, part of the 16th-century farm. A previous division into two floors is still apparent.

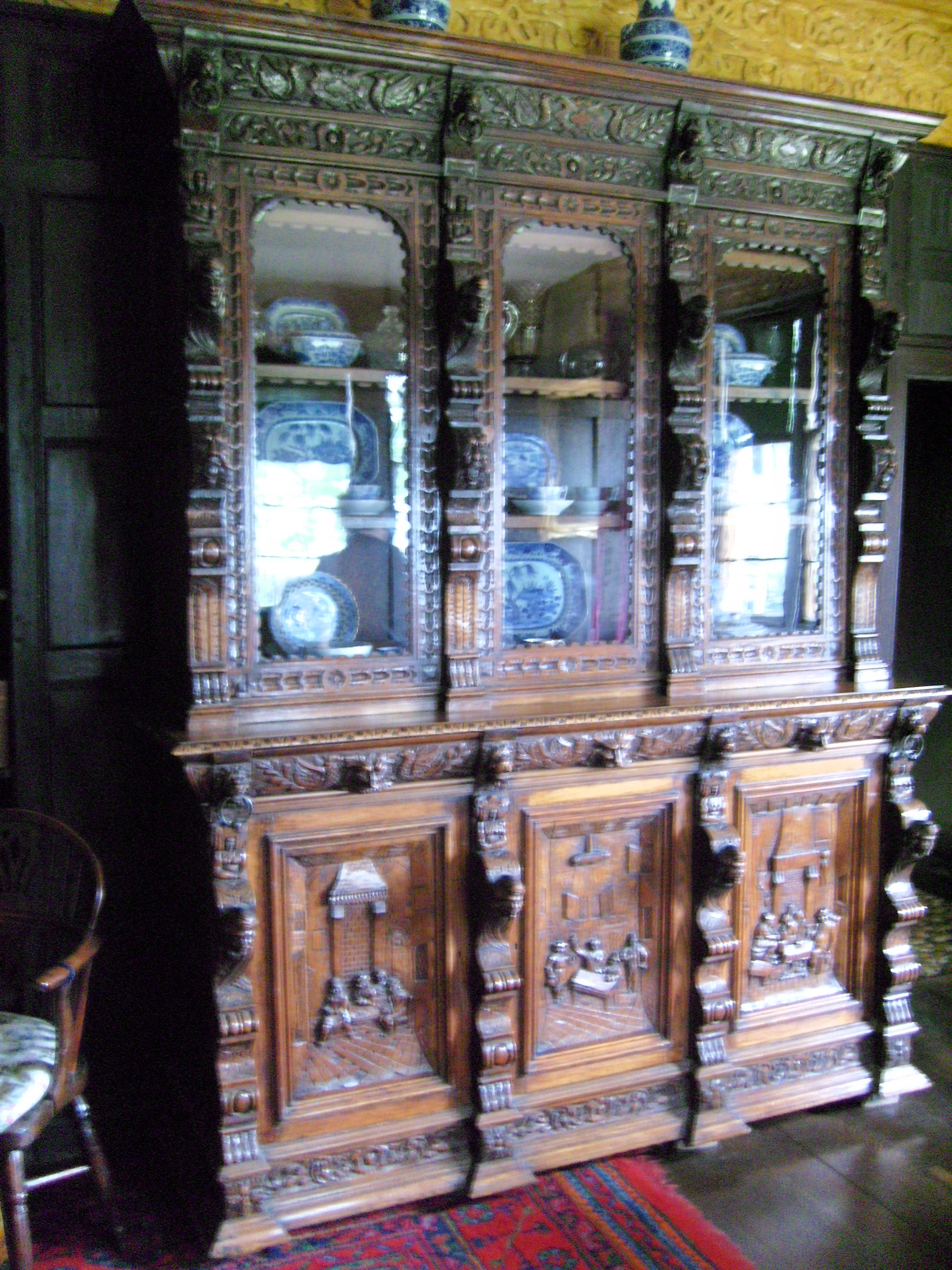
A dresser in the parlour. 19th-century German reproduction of 16th or 17th-century work.

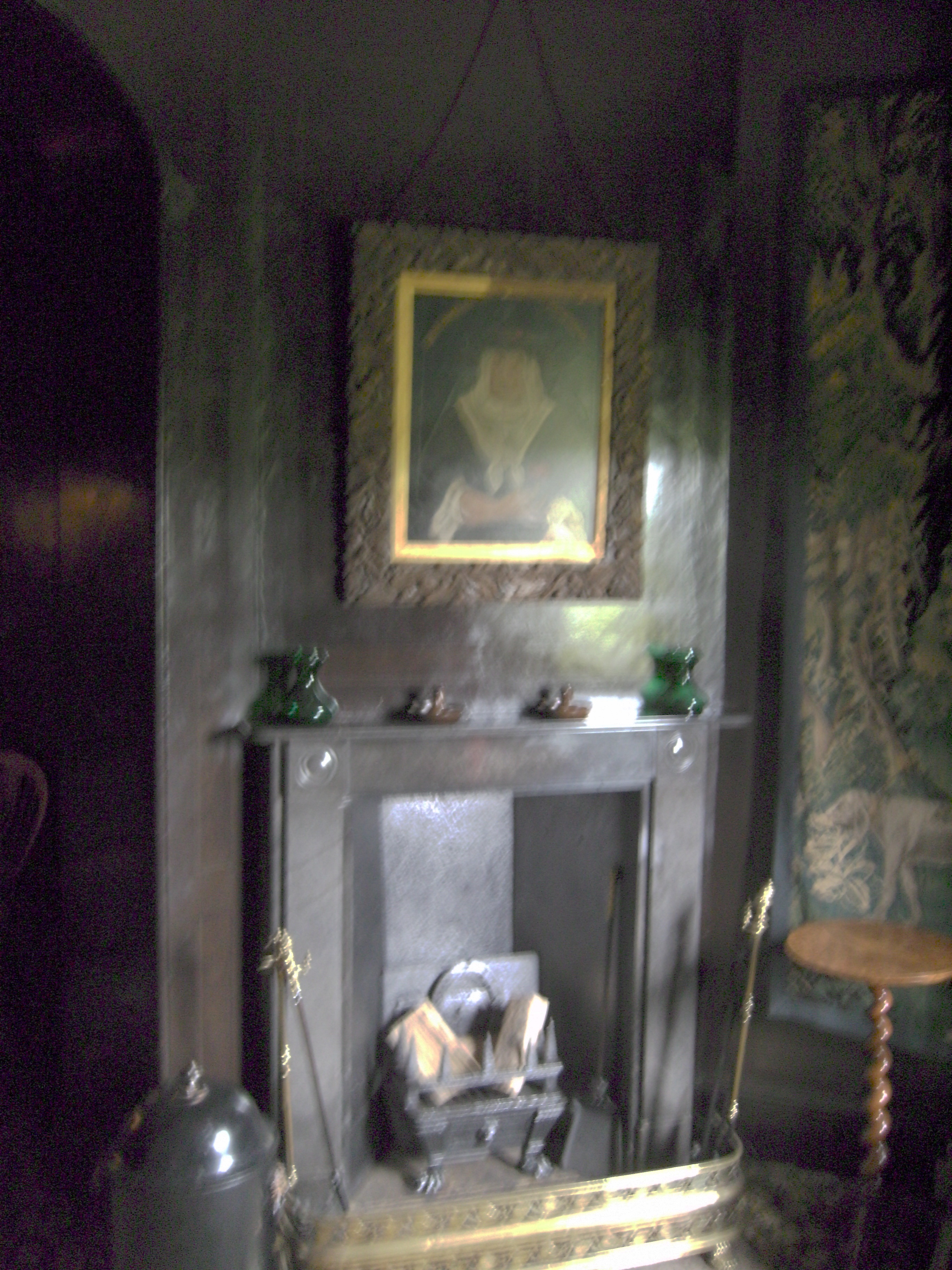
A view into the Oratory from the parlour, showing the fireplace and the portrait of "Dame Joan" Pendrell.

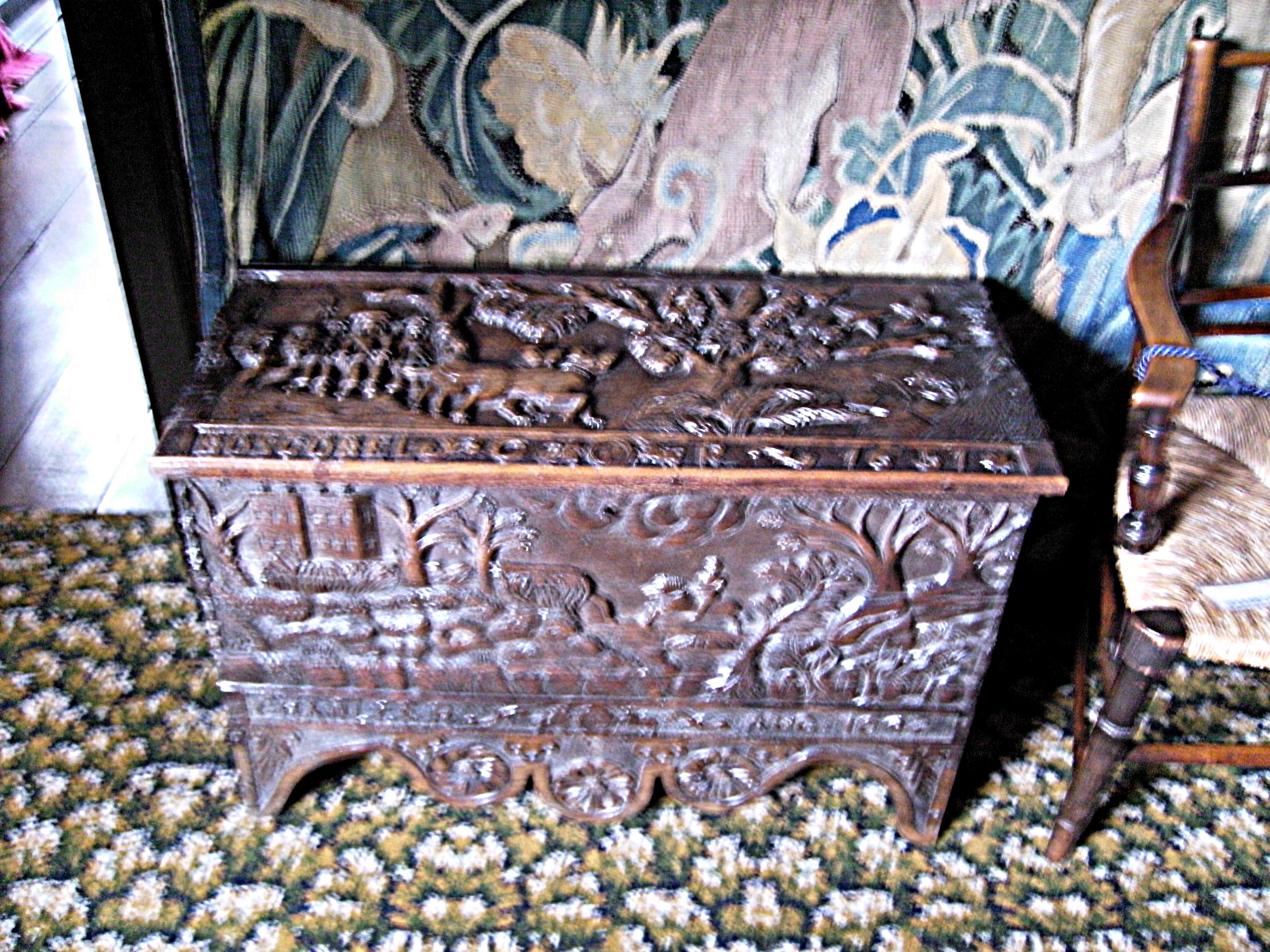
Carved chest commemorating 17th-century events – probably 19th-century work on an earlier artefact.

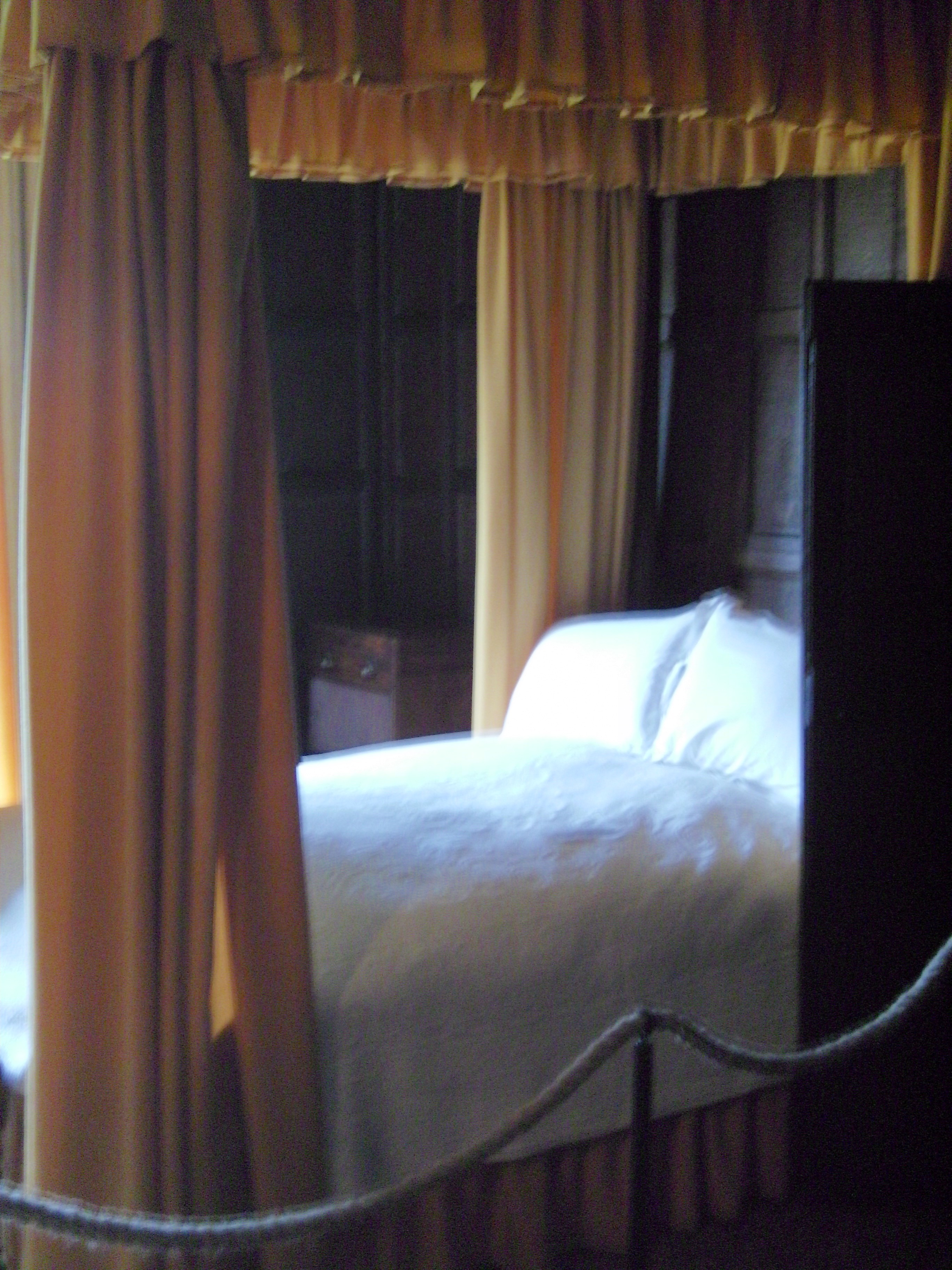
The Squire's Room, a first floor room furnished in 17th-century style.

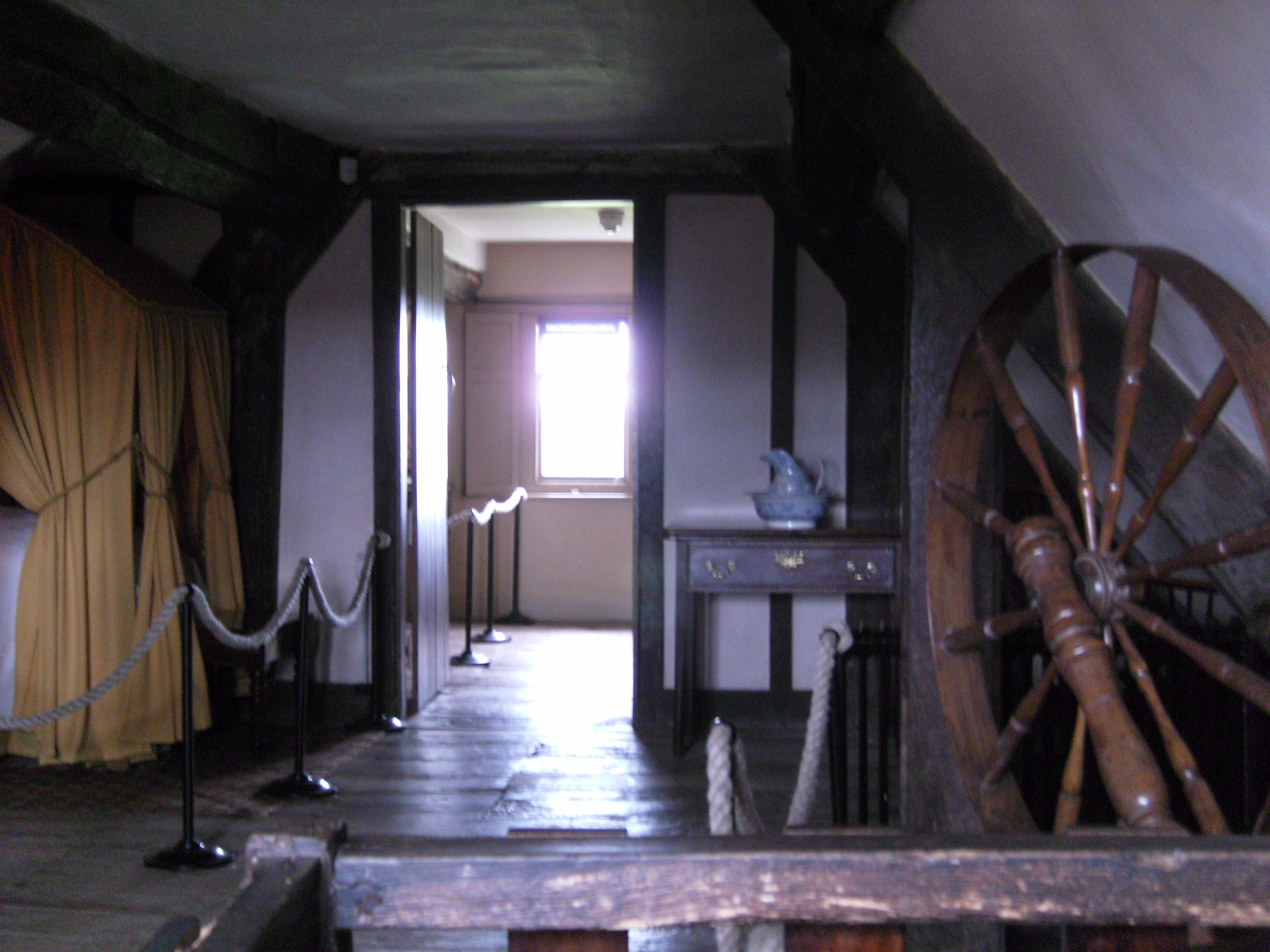
The upper floor of the hunting lodge, originally an attic store, but converted into bedrooms in the 19th century.

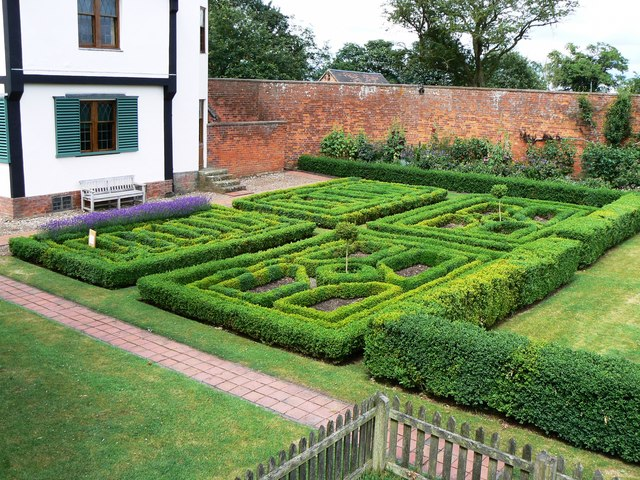
The restored parterre garden, behind the 17th-century house constructed by John Giffard.

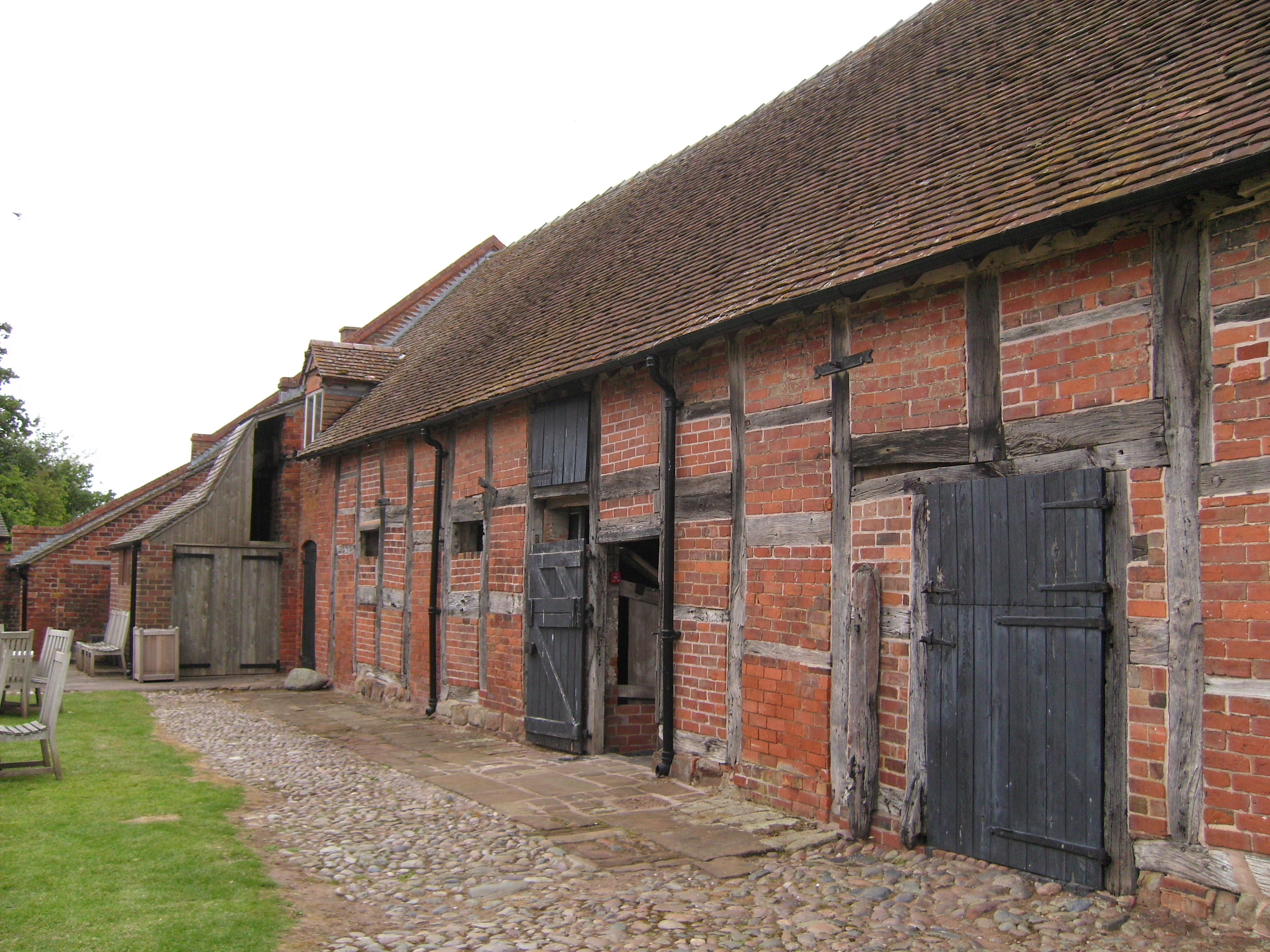
The 16th-century barn which bounds the northern edge of the farmyard.

=== Grounds ===
North of the house lies a large farmyard, mostly surrounded by Victorian farm buildings, although there is a large 17th-century barn. The yard provides picnic space, as well as housing a display of Victorian farm machinery and equipment.

To the south are the formal gardens. First is a parterre hedged with box, laid out in recent times but occupying approximately the area of a box garden shown in 17th-century views of Boscobel. On its south-west corner is the Mount, a mound topped by a modern shelter, where Charles spent the day reading.

Beyond the formal area is a kitchen garden with an orchard of fruit trees. Alongside runs a walk flanked on both sides by hazelnut trees.

=== The Royal Oak ===
The Royal Oak stands about 150 yards (137m) south-west of the house, in a farmer's field, but with an access path. It is believed to be a direct descendant of the original tree used by Charles and Careless to hide from the Parliamentary soldiers, although it has sometimes been presented as the actual tree. It has been surrounded by iron railings for many decades, but an outer wooden fence was added to protect visitors from falling timber after major cracks appeared in Autumn 2010. It has suffered badly from tourist depredations in the past, but its main threat is bad weather.

Three third generation descendants of the Royal Oak have been ceremonially planted nearby:

1. In 1897, a tree was planted on the western edge of the garden of Boscobel House by Augustus Legge, then bishop of Lichfield, to commemorate the Diamond Jubilee of Queen Victoria.
2. A further tree was planted ceremonially in 1951 near the site of the original Royal Oak by the Orlando Bridgeman, 5th Earl of Bradford, who was the owner of Boscobel House at the time, to mark the tercentenary of Charles II's escape.
3. Another oak sapling grown from one of the Son's acorns was planted in 2001 by Prince Charles.

=== Gallery ===
Grounds and displays

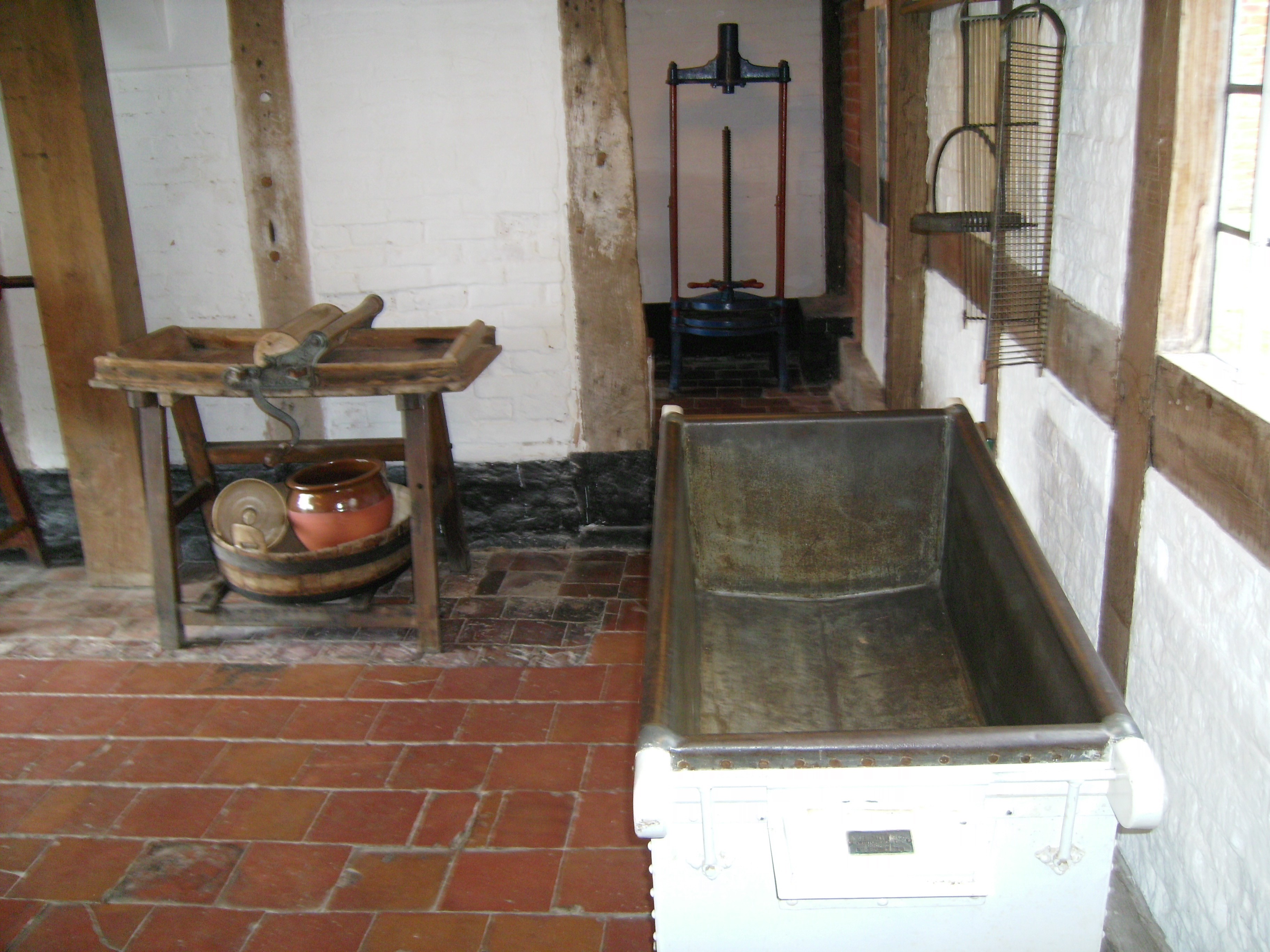
Display of butter-making equipment on the ground floor of the 16th-century farm.

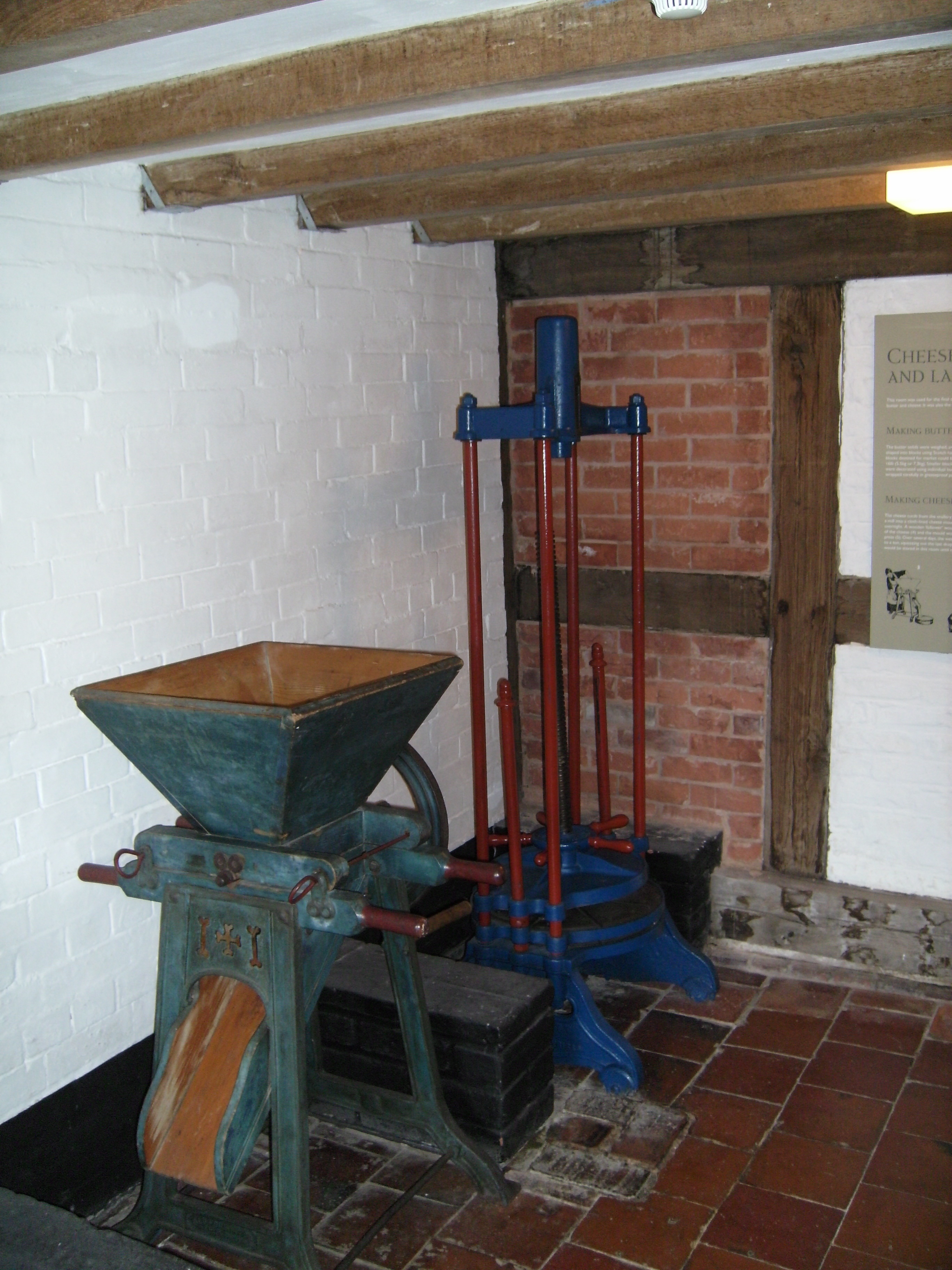
Curd mill and cheese press in the dairy display.

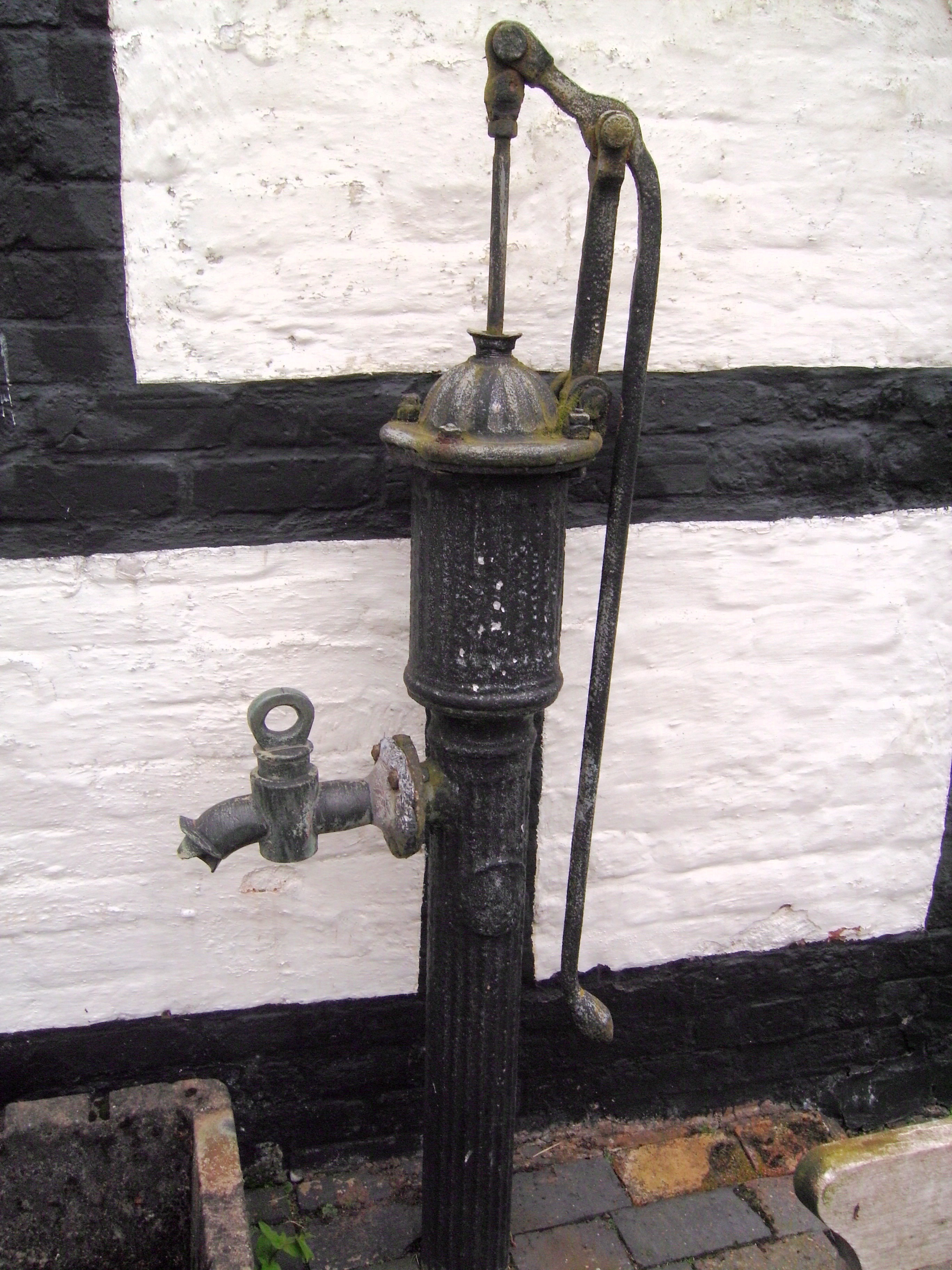
Water pump outside the 19th-century farm building.

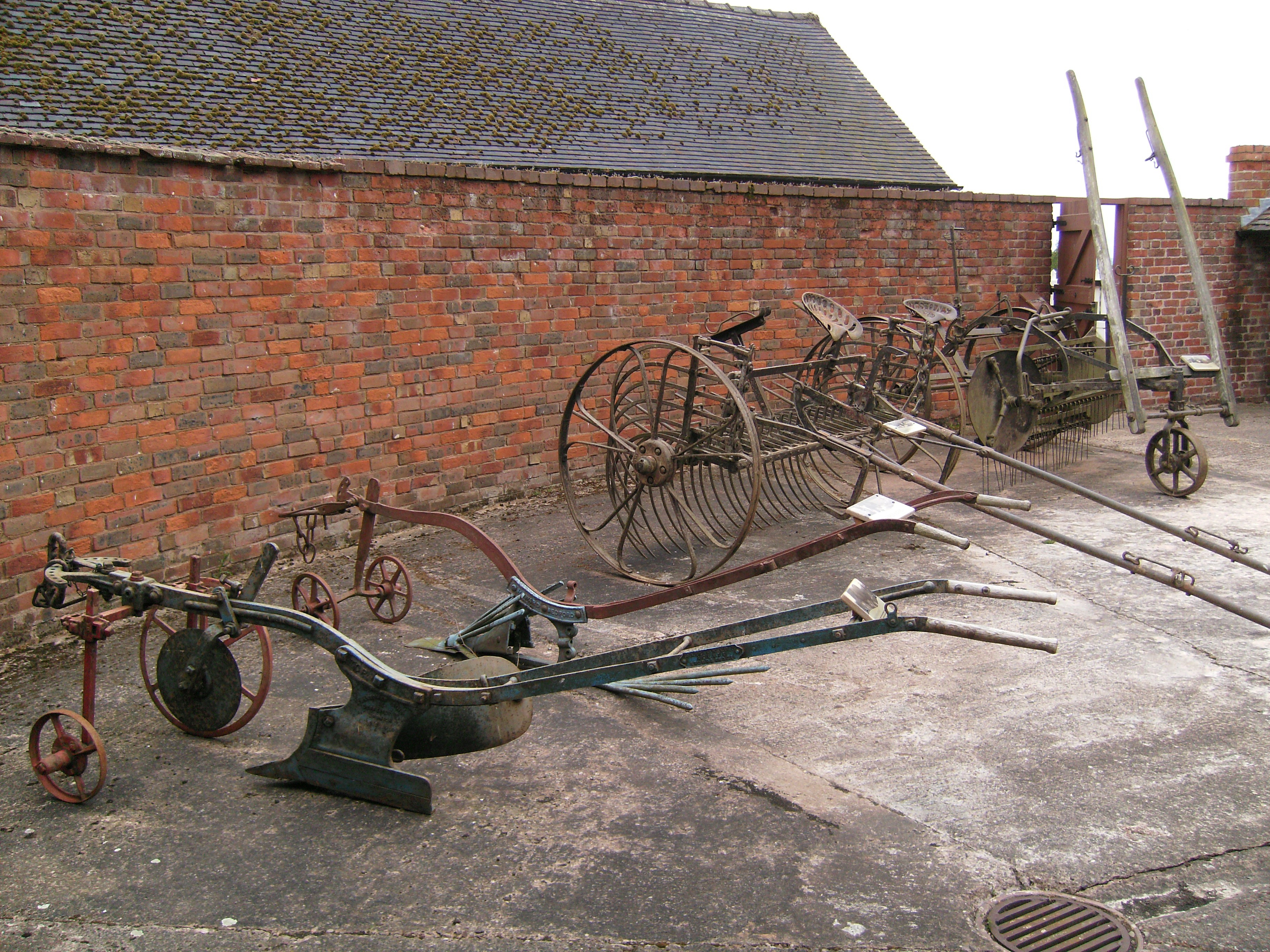
Display of farm machinery in the yard: single furrow plough, potato plough, and rakes.

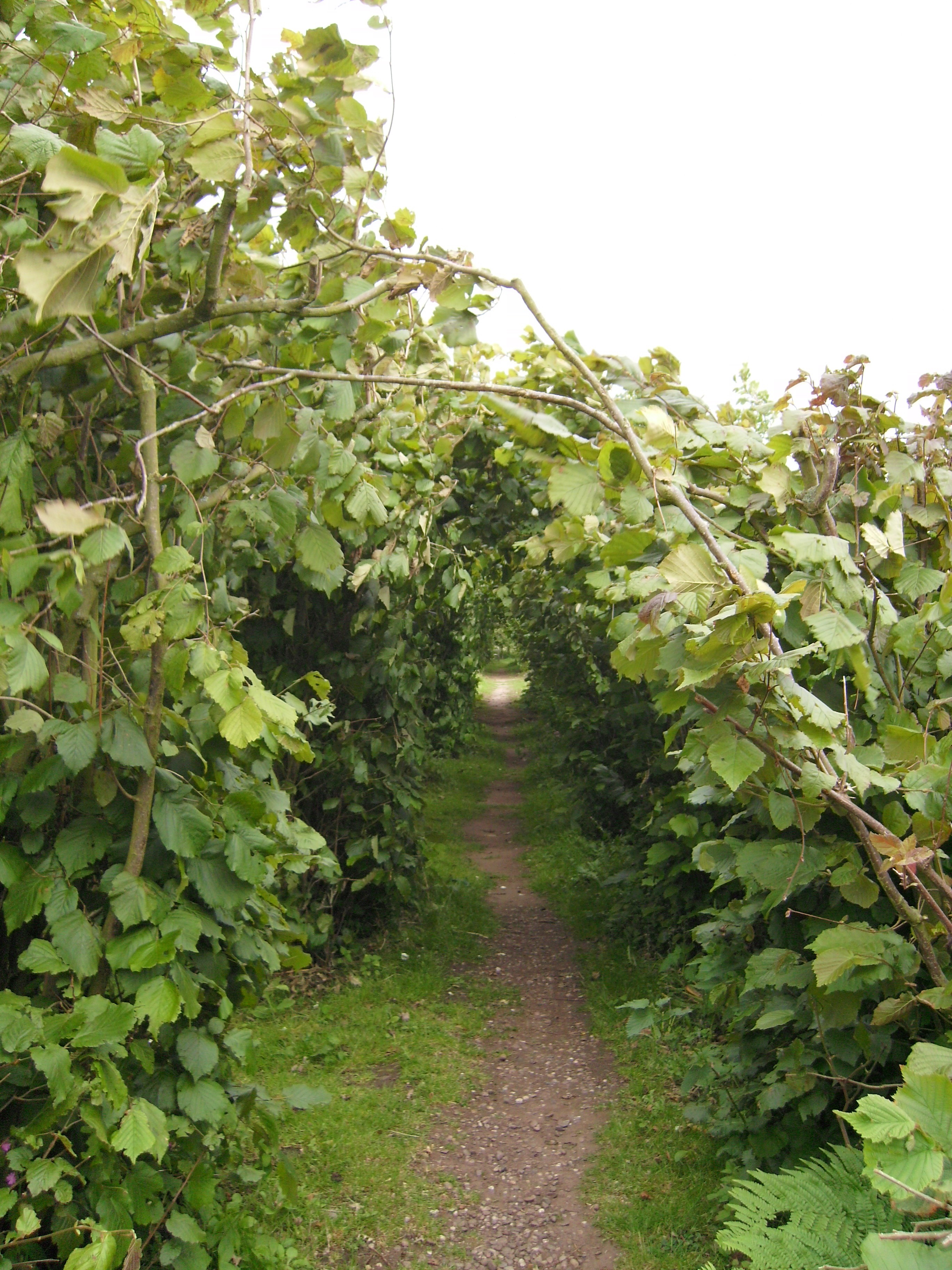
The nut garden, an avenue of hazelnut trees.

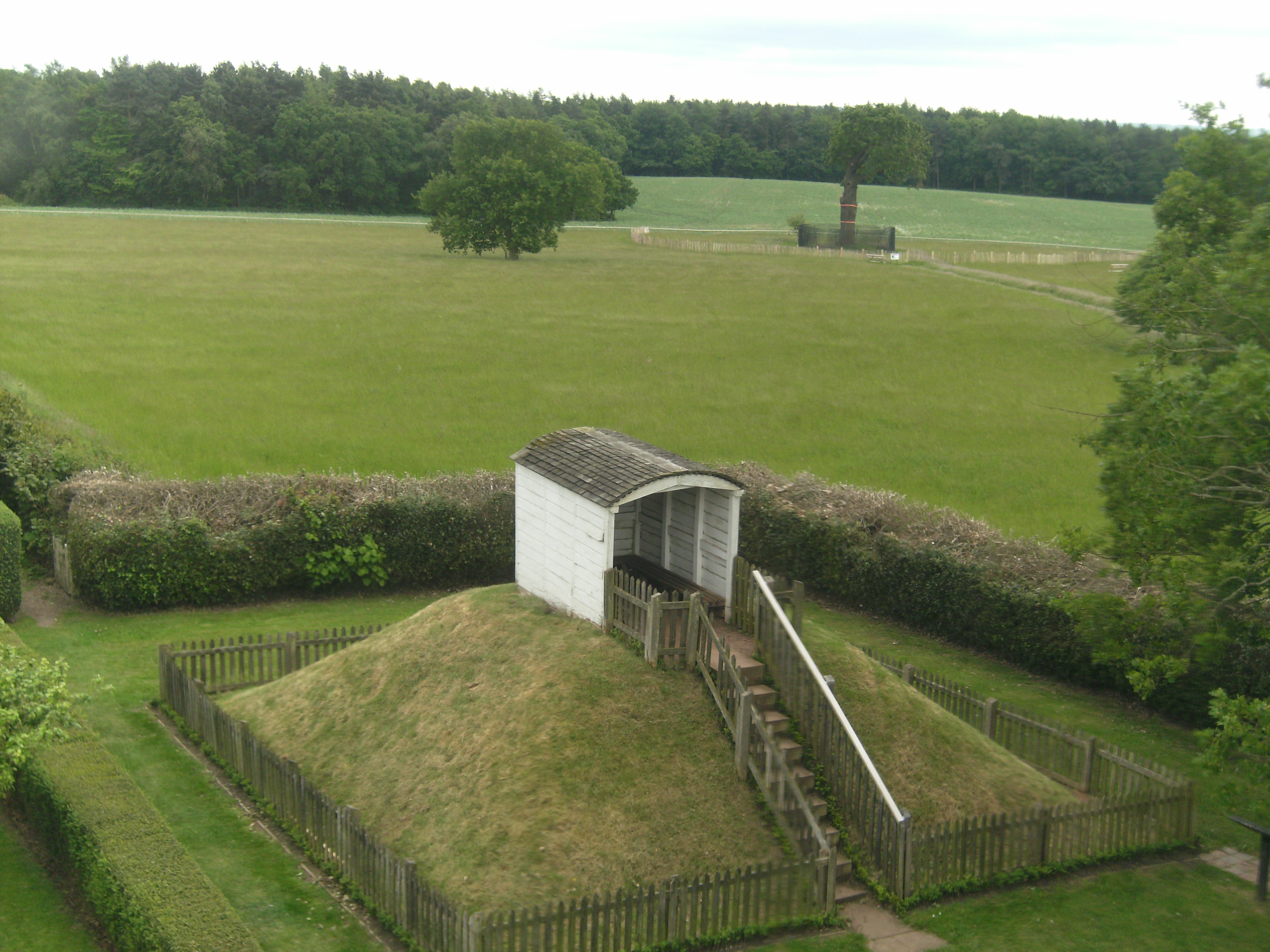
The Mount, with the Royal Oak and the tercentenary oak in the background.

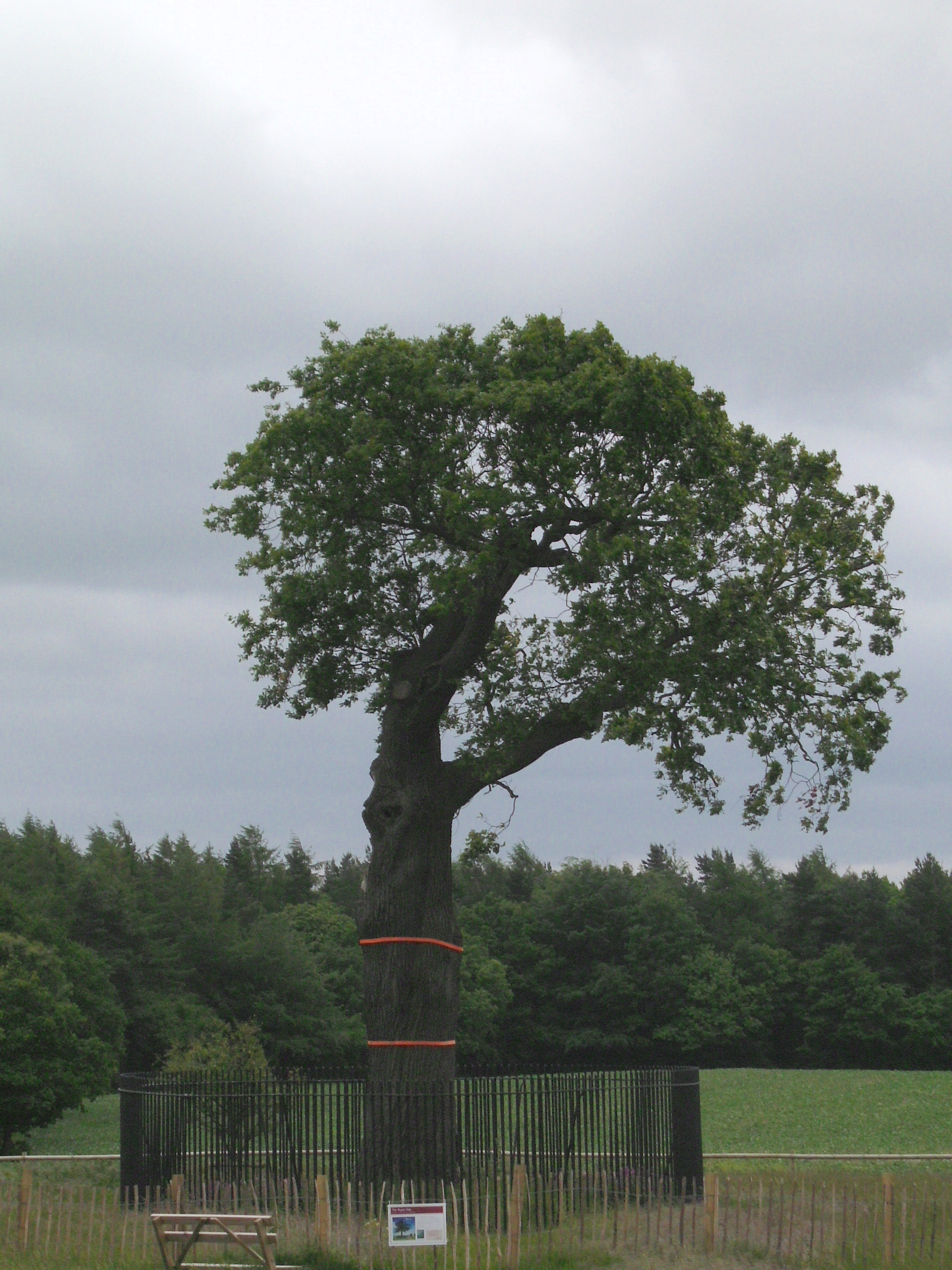
The Royal Oak as it appeared in 2011. It was further distanced from visitors after serious cracks were discovered in Autumn 2010.

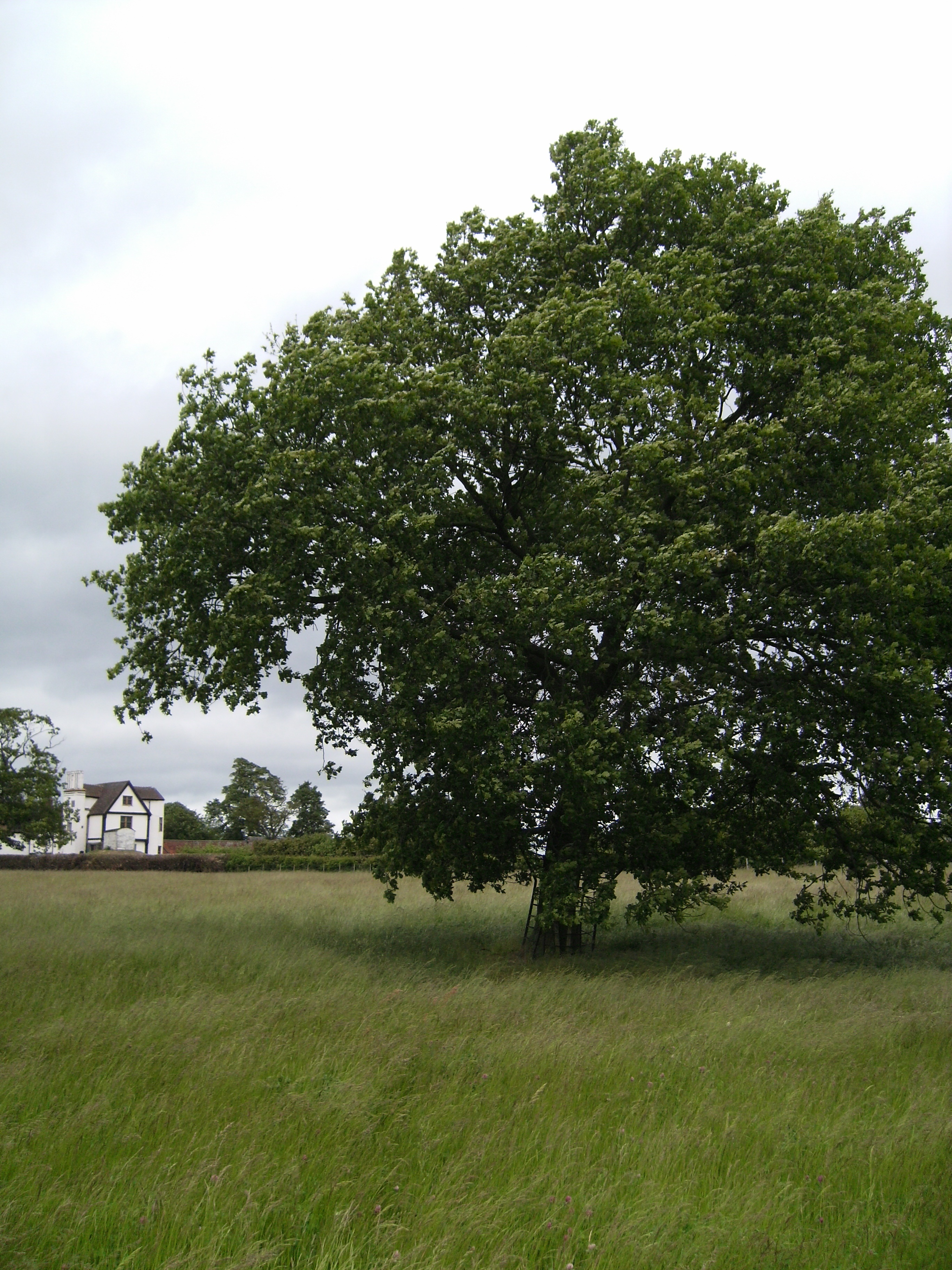
Granddaughter tree of the Royal Oak, planted in 1951 to commemorate the tercentenary of the escape of Charles II.

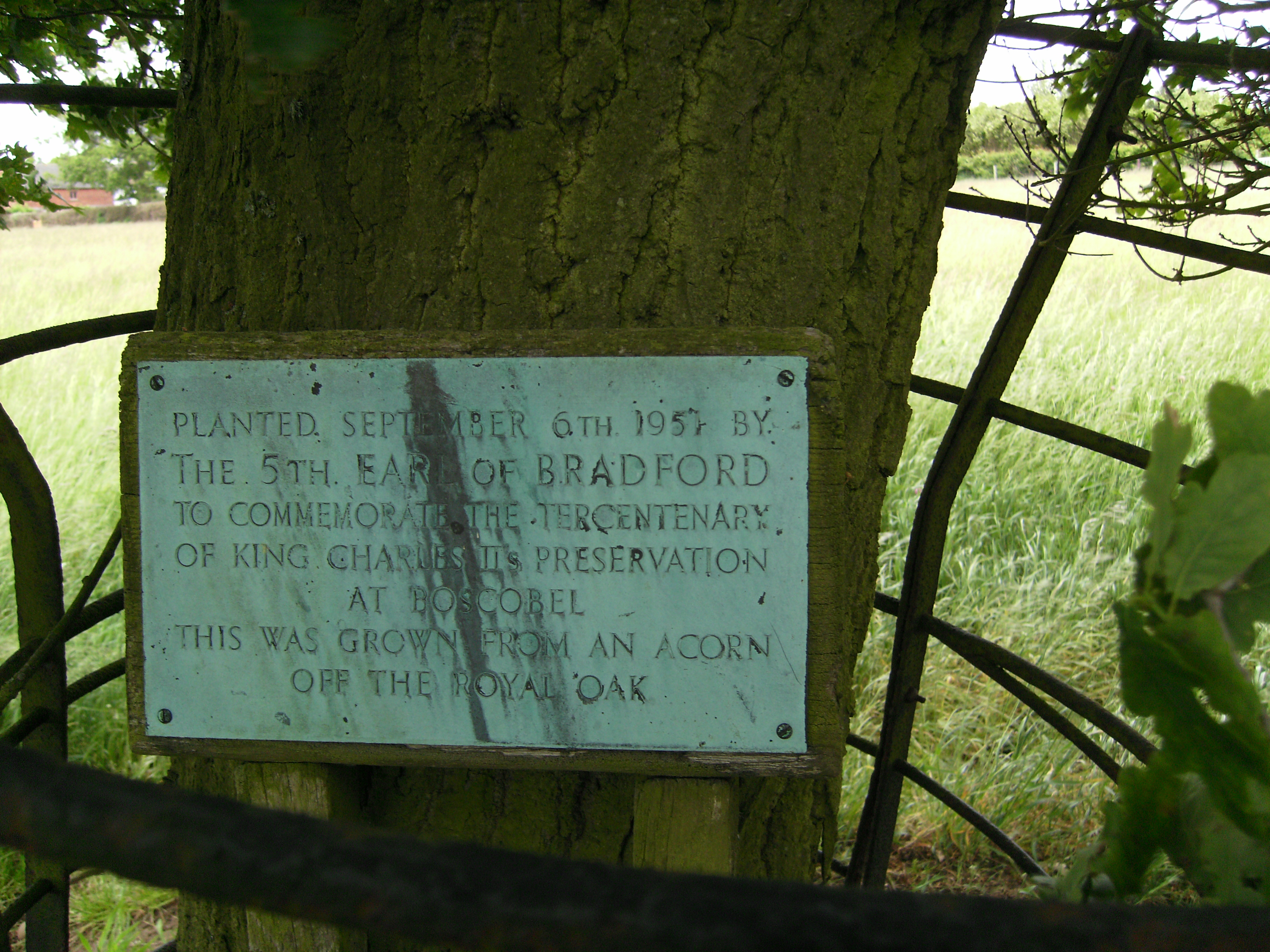
Commemorative plaque on the third generation oak planted in 1951.

=== Opening ===
Boscobel House and its grounds are generally open from Wednesday to Sunday each week in the summer (April to October). There are entrance charges, although entry is free to English Heritage members. Free educational group visits are available by arrangement.

== Cultural reference ==
The house and its part in the escape of Charles II provided the setting and title of William Harrison Ainsworth's historical novel Boscobel (published 1872).

== See also ==
- Grade II* listed buildings in Shropshire Council (A–G)
- Listed buildings in Boscobel
