= Bishops Wood =

Village in Staffordshire, England

Coordinates: 52.68259°N 2.2402°W

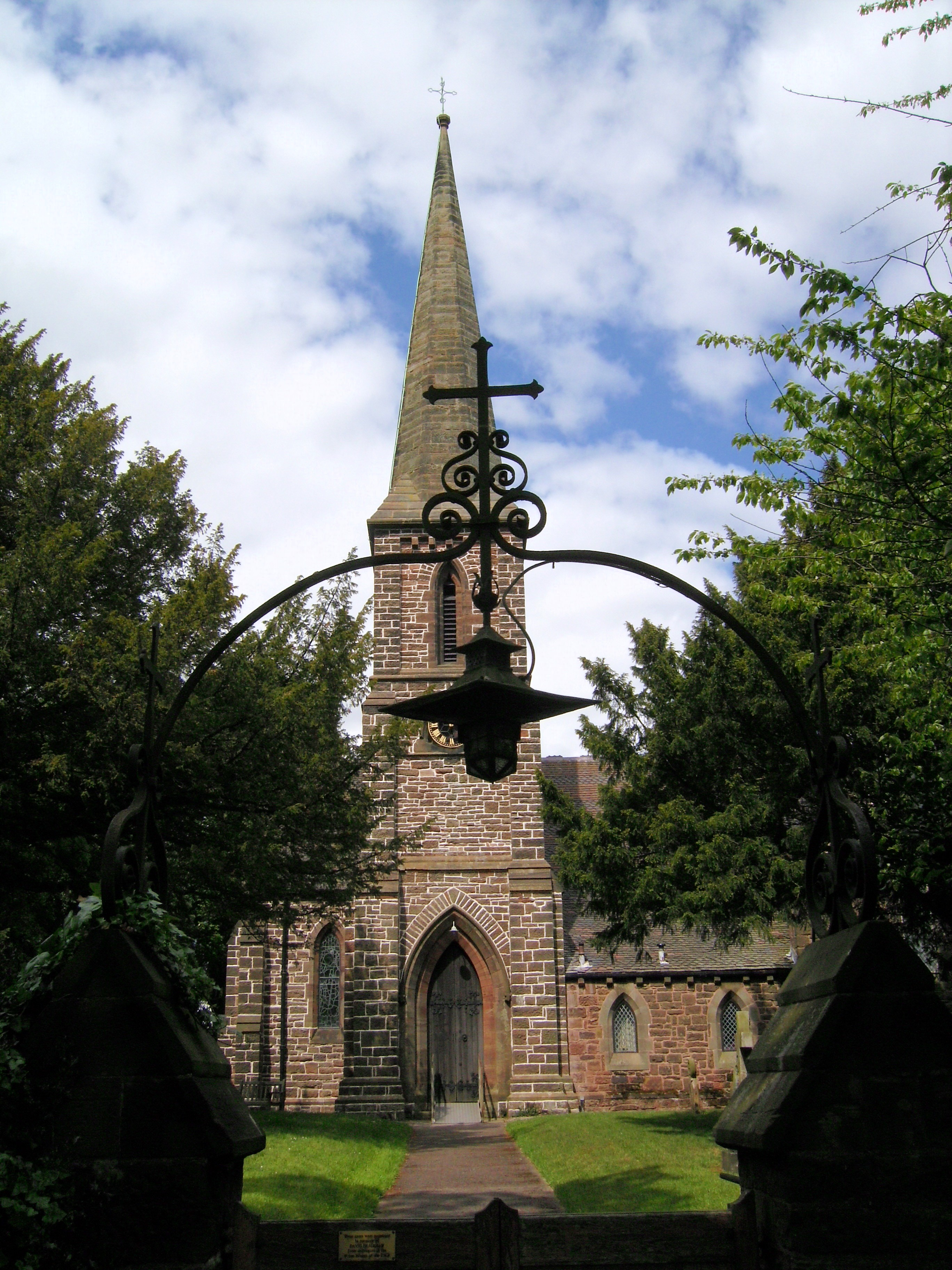
- St John the Evangelist's Church

- Location within Staffordshire
- OS grid reference: SJ835097
- District: South Staffordshire
- Shire county: Staffordshire
- Region: West Midlands
- Country: England
- Sovereign state: United Kingdom
- Post town: Stafford
- Postcode district: ST19
- Police: Staffordshire
- Fire: Staffordshire
- Ambulance: West Midlands
- UK Parliament: Stone, Great Wyrley and Penkridge

Bishops Wood, or Bishopswood (grid reference SJ835097) is a small village on the Staffordshire border with Shropshire. It is home to the Royal Oak public house, the first to be named after the nearby oak tree at Boscobel House in which King Charles II hid after the Battle of Worcester. It has two English Heritage sites, with them being Boscobel House and White Ladies Priory. The population for this village taken at the 2011 census can be found under Brewood and Coven.

The village, in the parish of Brewood, may derive its name from the country residence of the early Bishops of Lichfield: Boscobel House. The King Charles II Royal Oak tree, White Ladies Priory, Blackladies (another former priory, now a private residence) and Weston Park are all within easy walking distance.

== See also ==
- Listed buildings in Brewood and Coven
