= St Mary and St Chad's Church, Brewood =

Church in Staffordshire, England

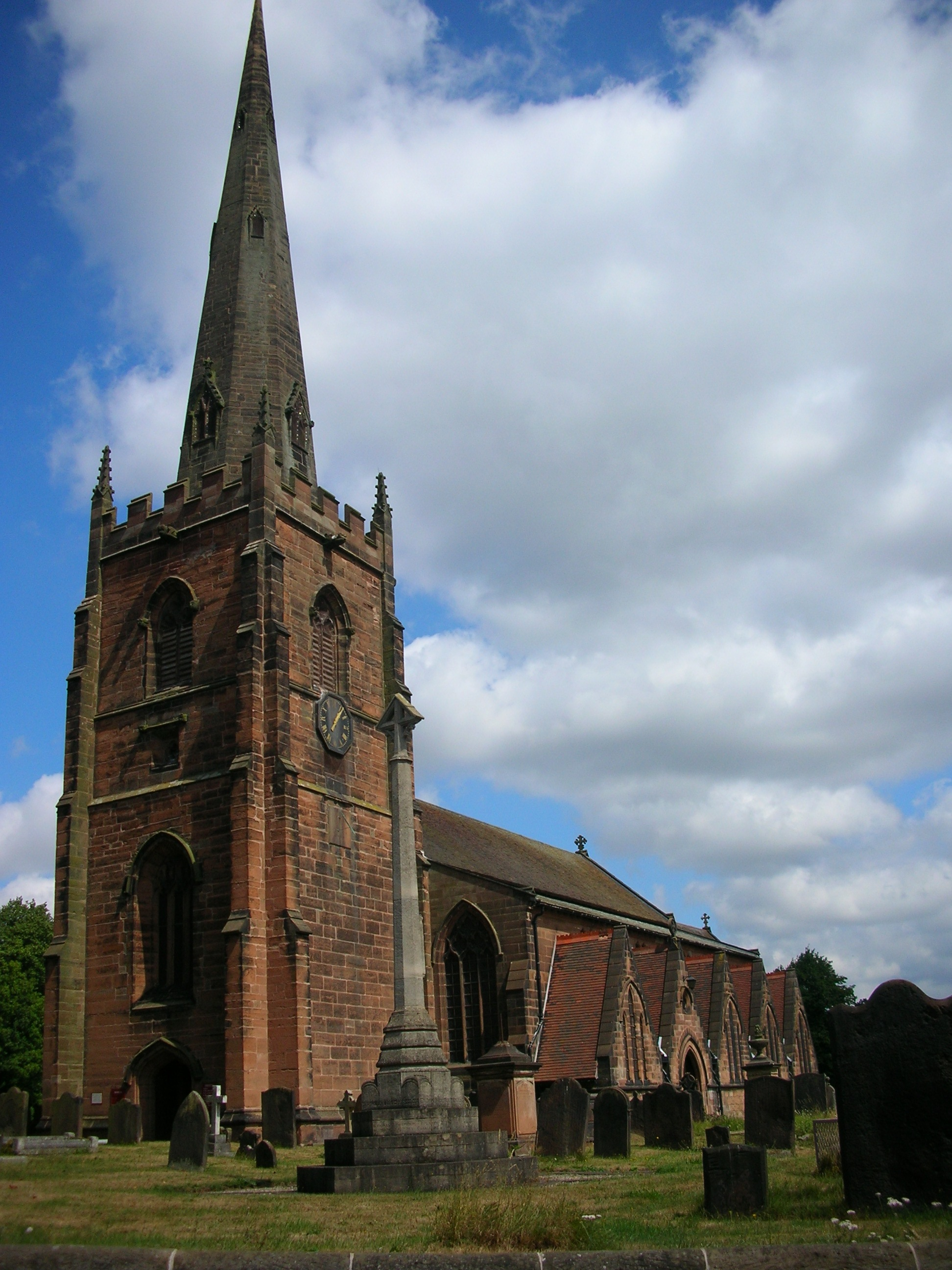
- St Mary and St Chad's Church, Brewood
- St Mary and St Chad's Church, Brewood
- 52°40′32″N 2°10′25″W
- OS grid reference: SJ 88349 08664
- Address: St Mary and St Chad Church, Brewood, South Staffordshire, ST19
- Country: England
- Denomination: Church of England
- Website: https://www.brewoodparishchurches.org

History
- Dedication: St Mary the Virgin; St Chad

Architecture
- Style: Early English; Perpendicular

Administration
- Diocese: Lichfield
- Parish: Brewood

St Mary and St Chad's Church is an Anglican parish church, situated in Brewood, Staffordshire. It has been a grade I listed building since 1962.

== History ==
Certain parts of the church, such as the Early English chancel, date back to at least the thirteenth century; this makes the church the oldest building in Brewood parish. However, as the Domesday survey of 1086 lists a village priest, it is very likely that a church of some form has existed in Brewood since at least the 11th century, probably on the site of the current church. It has even been speculated that, as there is evidence that St Chad of Mercia spent time as a missionary in the Midlands, he himself may have preached in Brewood and founded the church; it was customary of the Celtic church to name churches after their founders.

Evidence suggests that the church was one of twelve military outposts in the region that were garrisoned or fortified by the Royalists during the civil war.

The church is not aligned directly to the east, but is, instead, aligned towards the point at which the sun rose on St Matthew's Day (21 September).

=== Nave and aisles ===
The nave dates from around 1375. In the 16th century, or perhaps even earlier, the north aisle was significantly altered: the walls were raised, buttresses were added, and larger windows were inserted. The south aisle is unusually wide, which indicates that large processions may have taken place at the church from an early date, possibly during the Bishop of Lichfield's time in Brewood.

=== Tower and spire ===
It is likely that the tower and spire date from the early 16th century. The tower itself is square, and was built in the Perpendicular style, with double buttresses and pinnacles on its corners, a crenellated parapet (which was rebuilt in 1934), and a grotesque gargoyle on each wall. Next to the west door, there are grooves in the wall, where medieval bowmen have sharpened their arrows.

=== Chancel ===
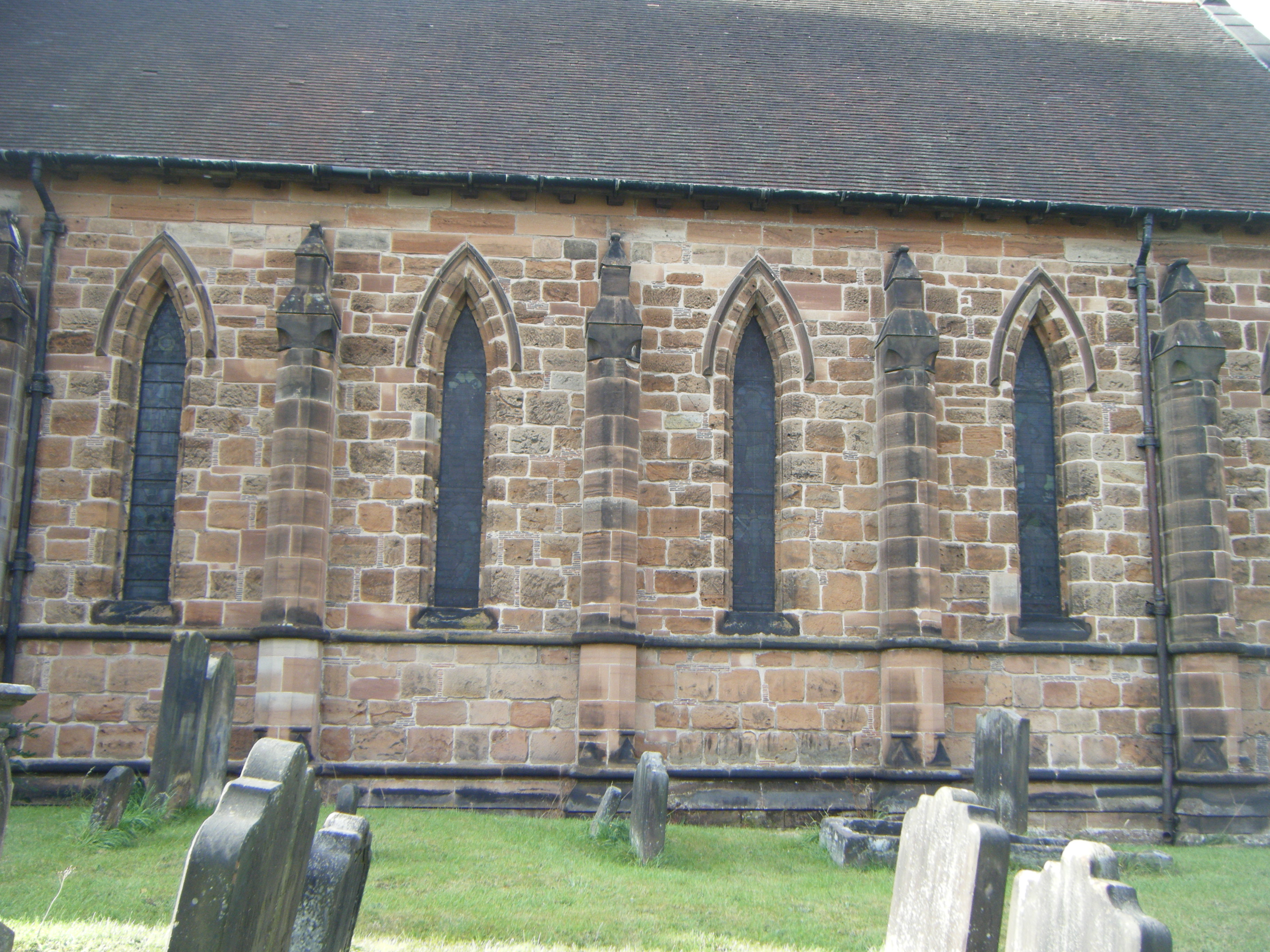
The south wall of the chancel, with its lancet windows

Dating from at least as early as 1220, the chancel is certainly the oldest part of the church. It is also the least altered part of the church; except for the rebuilding of the east wall in the 18th century, very little of it has been changed. A vestry, which has now been demolished, was once attached to the north wall, and both the north and south walls contain lancet windows, of the Early English style. During extensive interior alterations in 1827–30, the carved oak chancel screen was broken up and dispersed among the parish, as were the oak choir stalls (the choir stalls and pulpit that exist today date from 1887 and 1879, respectively).

=== Crypt ===
In 1958, an opening on the south side of the church, at the corner of the tower and the nave, revealed a crypt. At the time, the Church Commissioners were repairing the chancel. It is thought that the crypt had been filled with rubble and sand in 1878; this debris had settled, exposing lime-washed vaulting.

=== Restorations by G.E. Street ===
Between the years of 1878 and 1880, G.E. Street made significant alterations to the church. He rebuilt the east wall of the chancel, and there installed three graded lancet windows; he removed the north vestry; the building was refloored and reroofed; and he replaced the box pews with rush-seated chairs (which were replaced, again, in 1902, with the present pews). The entire restoration project cost £6,124.

=== 20th century restorations ===
Restoration works were carried out in 1904, which included altering floor levels, and removing iron railings that had, originally, surrounded the Giffard tombs. In 1927, electricity was connected to the church.

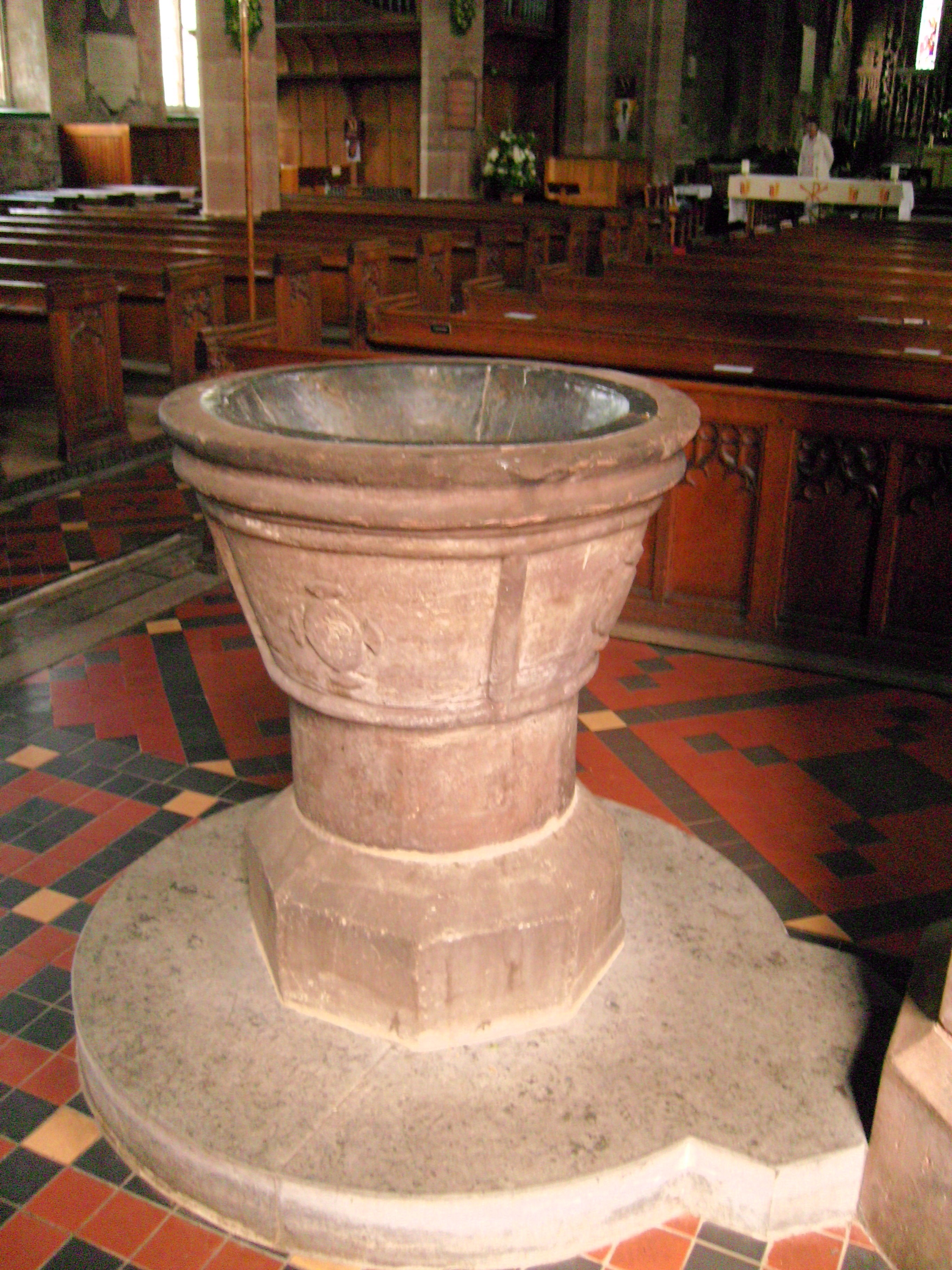
The historic font

== Notable features ==
=== Font ===
The church's font is thought to date from the late 16th century. During restoration works that were carried out in 1827–30, the font disappeared; it was found a century later in a garden in Coven, where it had been incorporated into a rockery. Prior to that, it had spent many years lying in a farmyard. The font was reinstalled in 1927, shortly after its rediscovery.

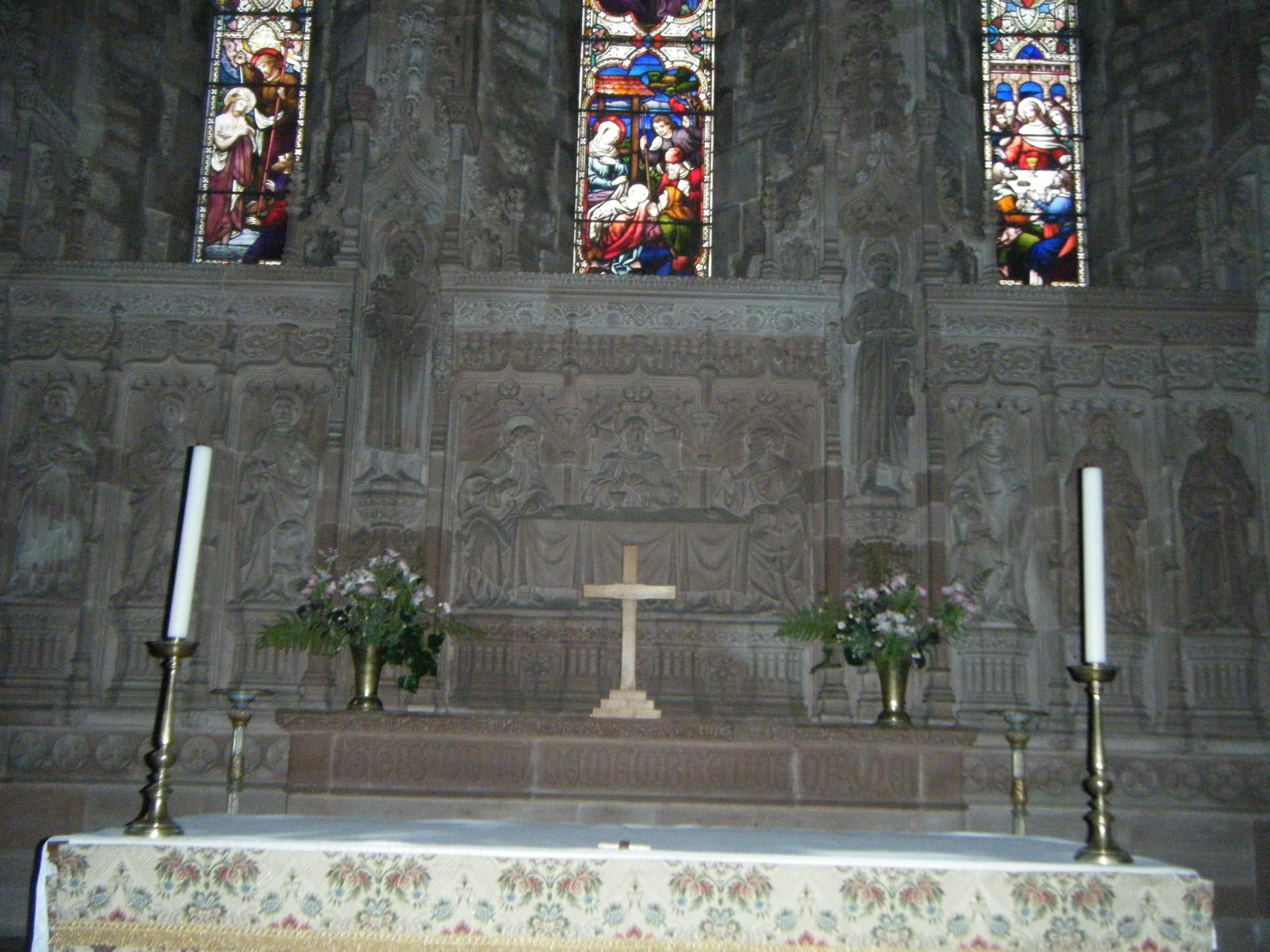
The sandstone reredos, behind the altar

=== Reredos ===
Installed in 1911, in memory of Richard Holt Briscoe of Chillington, the church's sandstone reredos depicts Jesus breaking bread with two disciples. It was designed by W.D. Caroë. A similar reredos is said to exist in St Margaret's Church, Westminster, made of metal.

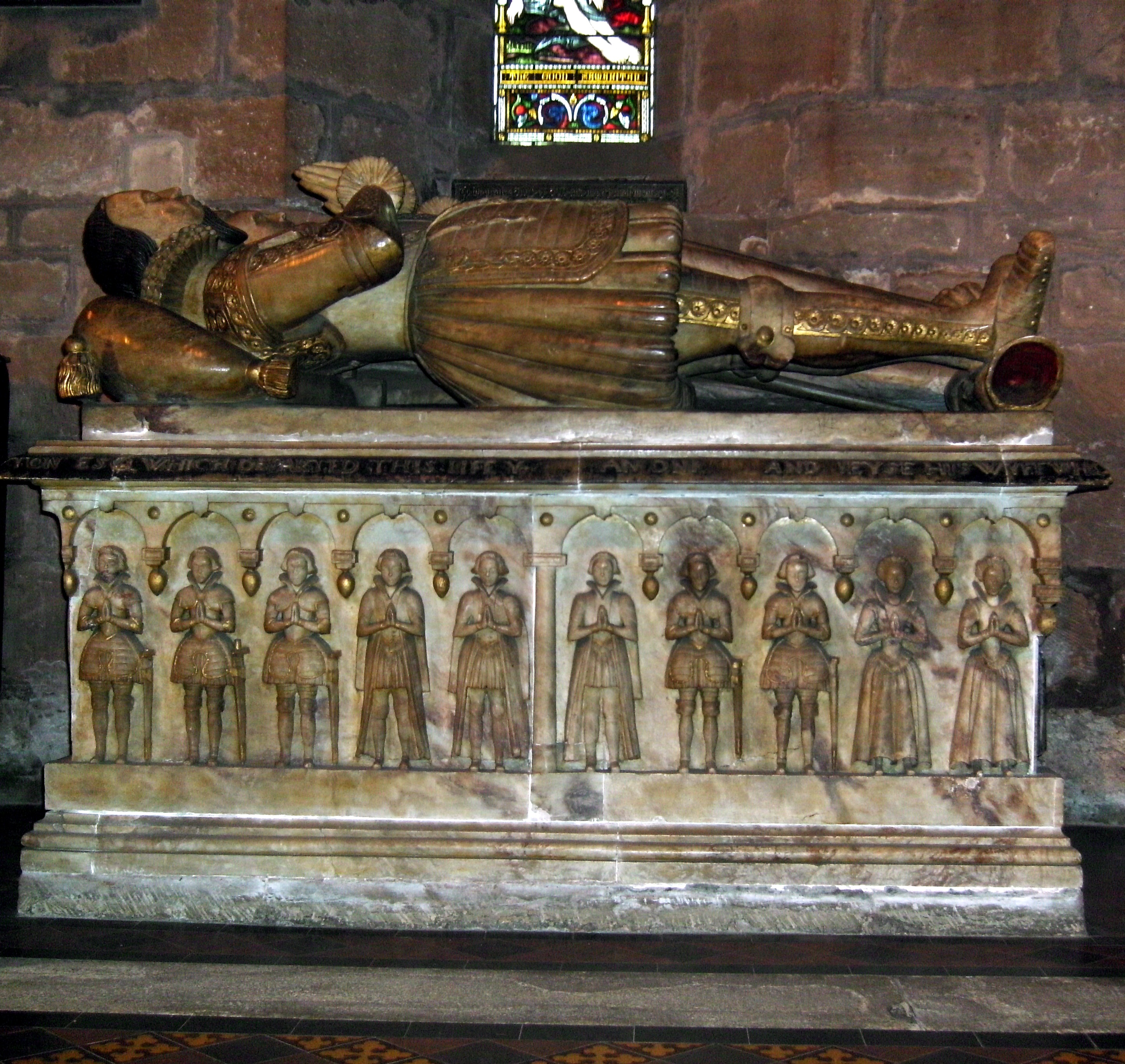
The tomb of Sir John Giffard (d. 1612)

=== Memorials and tombs ===
==== Alabaster altar tombs ====
Some of the most church's notable memorials include four alabaster altar tombs, which are located within the chancel. All four are dedicated to members of the Giffard family. Of those four, the oldest tomb is that of Sir John Giffard (d. 1556) and his two wives, Jane (Hoord) and Elizabeth (Greysley); the second oldest tomb is that of Sir Thomas Giffard (d. 1560) and his two wives, Dorothy (Montgomery) and Ursula (Throckmorton); the third is dedicated to Sir John Giffard (d. 1612) and his wife Joyce (Leveson); and the fourth to Walter Giffard (d. 1632) and his wife, Philippa (White).

==== Grave of Colonel William Careless ====
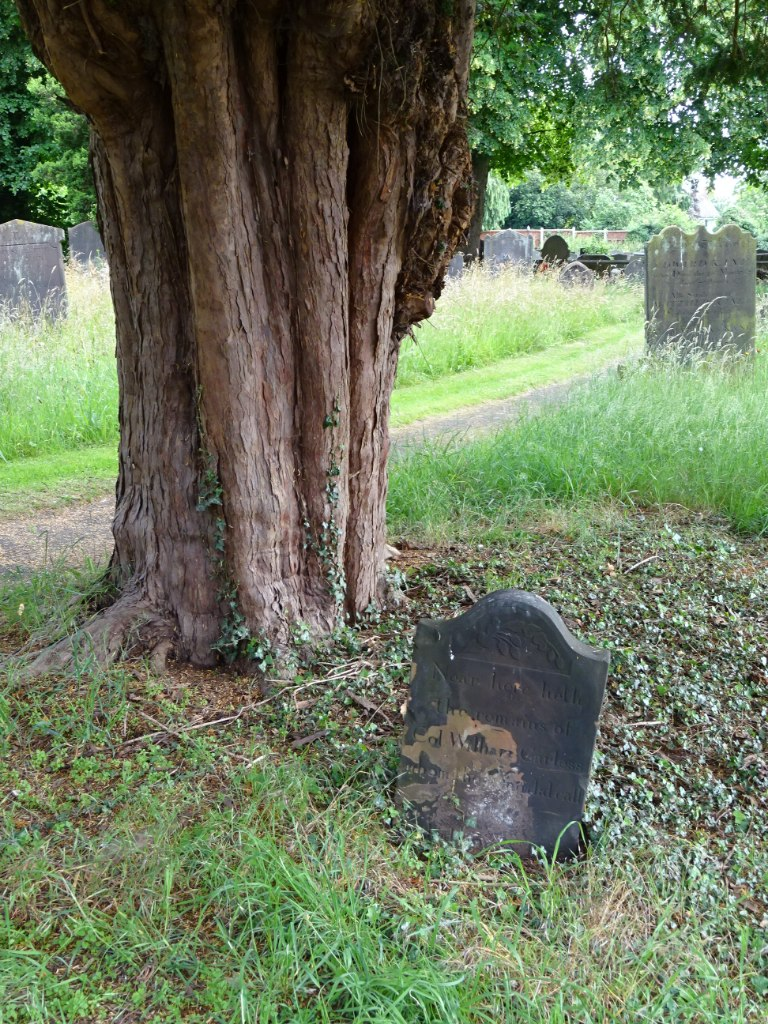
Memorial stone of William Careless

Colonel William Careless, who hid in the Royal Oak at Boscobel with Charles II, lies in an unmarked grave, towards the north west end of the churchyard. Nearby, there is a small sandstone memorial which bears the inscription: "Near here lieth / the remains of / Col William Carless / whom the King did call / Carlos / he died May 28, 1689." In the parish registers, his death is recorded: “Corinall William Carelesse, of Broumhall”. Apparently, the grave was once marked by a tombstone that bore the name "Careless", but, by 1897, it had vanished. There is, on the west wall of the chancel, a commemorative plaque dedicated to William Careless.

==== War memorials ====
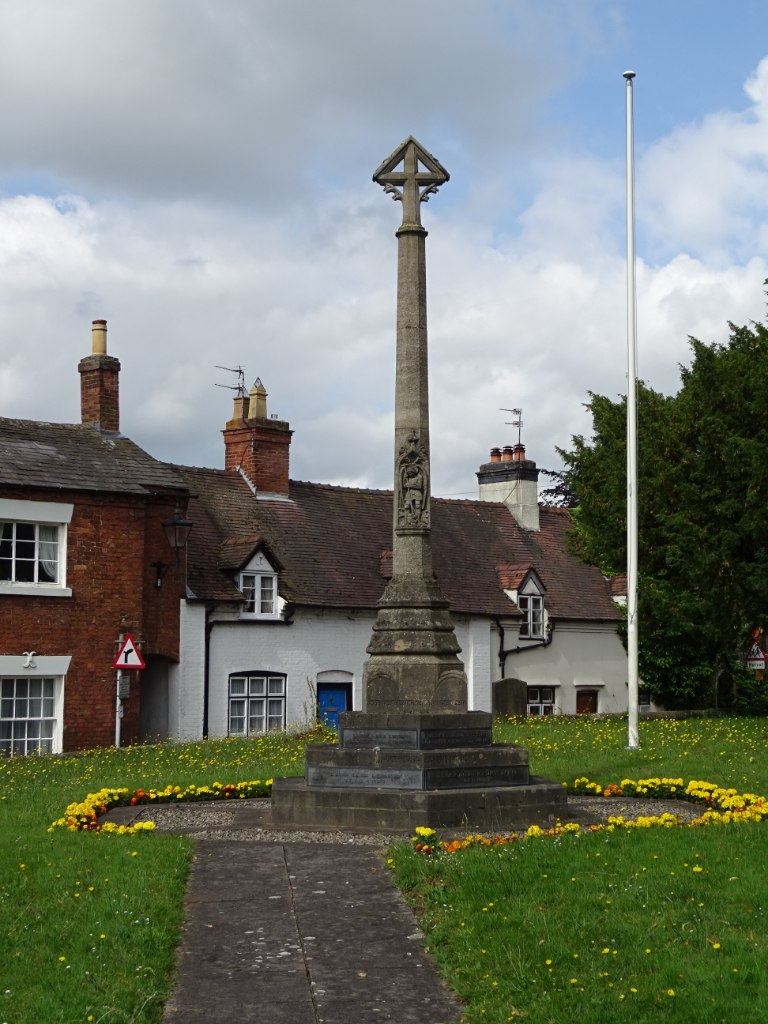
The war memorial

There are four Commonwealth war graves in the churchyard from World War I, and two from World War II. A war memorial, designed by W.D. Caroë, was erected in the churchyard in 1921. It records the village dead of both world wars.
