= William Careless =

Royalist officer (died 1689)

William Careless, later Carlos
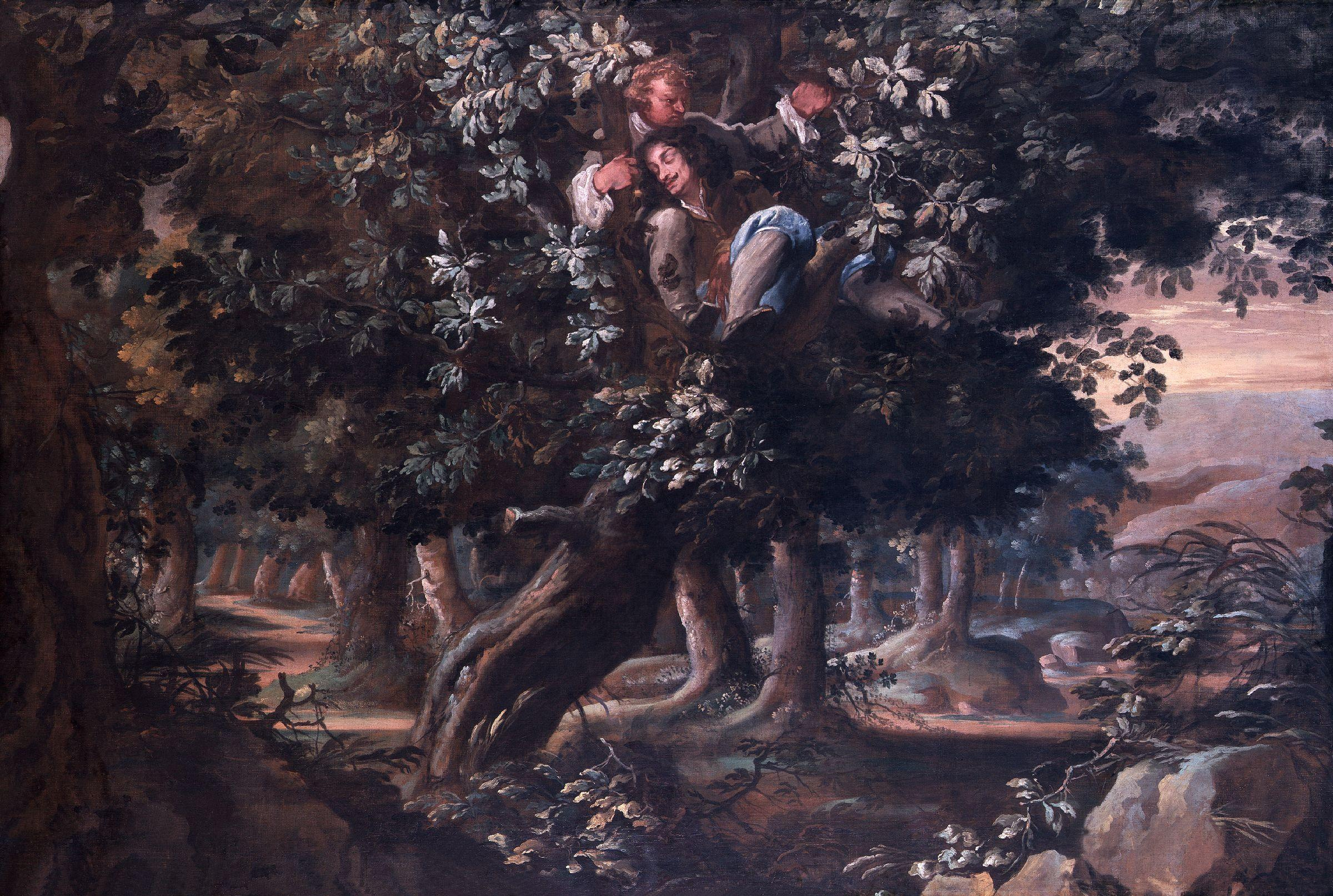
- King Charles II and Colonel William Careless in the Royal Oak by Isaac Fuller
- Born: c. 1610; Broom Hall, Brewood, Staffordshire
- Died: 1689 (aged 78–79); London
- Burial place: St. Mary the Virgin and St. Chad churchyard, Brewood.
- Military career
- Allegiance: Royalist
- Rank: Colonel
- Commands: A troop and later a regiment of cavalry, the garrison of Tong Castle, officer of the Royal Guard,
- Conflicts: English Civil War, Bolton Massacre, Battle of Marston Moor, Battle of Worcester, Battle of the Dunes (1658)

Colonel William Careless (surname variants include Carelesse, Carless, Carles and Carlis) (died 1689) was a Royalist officer of the English Civil War. It has been estimated in various written sources that he was born c. 1620, however, it is more likely that he was born c. 1610. He was the second son of John Careless of Broom Hall, Brewood, Staffordshire, and his wife Ellen Fluit. He is chiefly remembered as the companion of King Charles II when the fugitive monarch hid in the Royal Oak following his defeat at the Battle of Worcester. His surname was changed to Carlos, the Spanish for Charles, by order of Charles II. He died in 1689.

== Career ==
=== The First Civil War ===
Careless was a member of a recusant Roman Catholic family of Royalist sentiments. After the outbreak of hostilities in 1642 Careless raised a troop of cavalry to fight for Charles I, which he commanded as a captain in the regiment of Thomas Leveson. This regiment was largely officered by men from the Roman Catholic enclave of south Staffordshire. He was the captain of the Royalist garrison at Lapley House, Staffordshire, in 1643, and was appointed governor of Tong Castle, Shropshire, in April 1644. He appears to have rejoined his regiment to take part in Prince Rupert's campaign to relieve the siege of York. Careless (as William Carlis) has been listed as one of the two captains of Leveson's Horse present at the Bolton Massacre, an action controversial for the indiscriminate killing of Parliamentarian defenders and civilian inhabitants. His regiment then went on to fight as part of the right-wing cavalry, commanded by Lord Byron, at the Battle of Marston Moor in July 1644. Following this serious Royalist defeat Careless is next recorded in his native area of the English Midlands, when in December 1644 he was captured in a skirmish with Parliamentarian forces near Wolverhampton. In April 1645 he was recorded as one of the prisoners that the Parliamentarians were holding in the High House, Stafford. After his release Careless served in Ireland, lived in Lower Germany (Netherlands) for a time and became an officer in the Spanish army. He returned to England in or before 1650, and spent nine months in and around his home in Brewood before once again taking up arms in the Royalist cause.

=== The campaign of 1651 ===
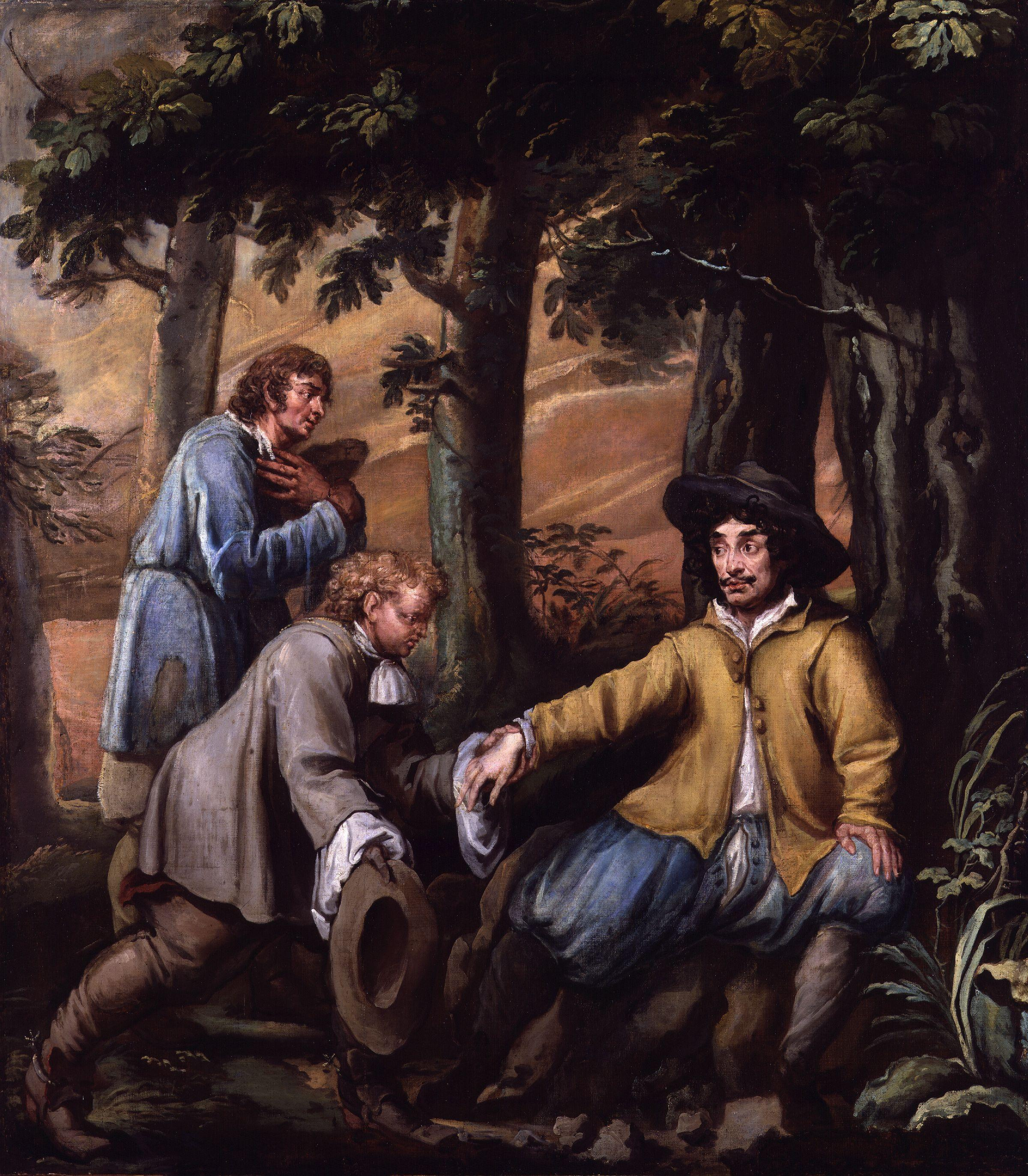
Careless greeting Charles II in Boscobel Wood, with one of the Penderel brothers, by Isaac Fuller.

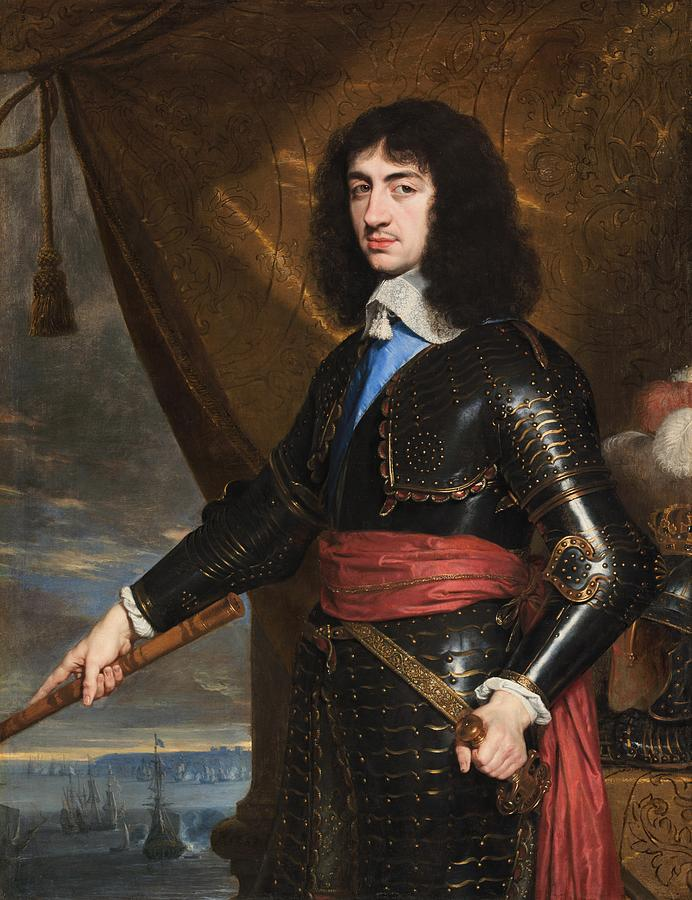
A young Charles II, c. 1653

After the execution of Charles I, his son Charles II invaded England at the head of a largely Scottish army. Careless joined the king with a small force, described as a regiment of horse, as he advanced on Worcester and fought as a major under Lord Talbot at the Battle of Worcester. The Royalist forces were very heavily defeated. Careless fought to the end, covering the King's flight alongside a handful of others including the Earl of Cleveland, Sir James Hamilton, Colonel Thomas Wogan and Captains Hornyhold, Giffard, and Kemble. Careless and his companions made a number of desperate cavalry charges down Sudbury Street and High Street, though heavily outnumbered. Hamilton and Kemble were badly wounded, and a number of troopers were killed. Their actions allowed King Charles to escape the city by St. Martin's Gate. Careless reputedly witnessed the death of the last man to be killed in the battle.

Following his catastrophic defeat, King Charles sought refuge at Boscobel House where, as he related to Samuel Pepys in 1680, he met Major Careless. Charles was being hidden and cared for by the Penderel family who, as tenants of the Giffard family, were living at Boscobel House. Careless, who was a local man, suggested that the house was unsafe and recommended that the king hide in a large pollarded oak tree in the woodlands of Boscobel (6 September 1651). The king and Careless took some food and drink into the tree and were gratified that Parliamentarian soldiers searched the woodland intensively without detecting them. The king, who was exhausted, slept in the tree for some of the time, being prevented from falling by Careless' support. Charles spent the night hiding in one of Boscobel's priest holes, Careless in another. The following day Careless killed and butchered a sheep with his dagger, the mutton was afterwards cooked by the king himself. Being too well known locally, and not wishing to draw attention to the disguised Charles, Careless parted from the king later the same day (7 September 1651).

A contemporary armorial locket containing a miniature portrait of William Careless is in the collection of the Victoria and Albert Museum, London, (see "External links" below). The inscription within the locket runs:

"Renowned Carlos! thow hast won the day
(Loyalty Lost) by helping Charles away,
From Kings-Blood-Thirsty-Rebels in a Night,
made black with Rage, of theives, & Hells dispight
Live! King-Loved-Sowle thy fame be Euer Spoke
By all whilst England Beares a Royall Oake"

=== Exile ===
Coat of arms

Careless escaped England independently of King Charles, fleeing to France; he was the first person to inform Charles' sister, Mary, Princess of Orange, of her brother's safety. In 1656 William Careless, with the rank of colonel, is listed as a captain in the King's Royal Regiment of Guards the lineal predecessor of the Grenadier Guards. At Brussels he received, in 1658 by letters patent under the Great Seal in the name of Carlos, a coat of arms incorporating an oak tree and three crowns representing the three kingdoms of the British Isles; an oak-leaf civic crown formed part of the crest.

Careless served with his regiment at the Battle of the Dunes (14 June 1658), near Dunkirk; this battle was fought between a Spanish army, with an allied British Royalist force commanded by the Duke of York (later King James II), and a French army with Cromwellian English (Commonwealth) allies. The Spanish army was defeated and Colonel Careless was made captive, however, he was soon released on a "half ransom." During the battle Careless' regiment stood firm when all the regiments around it fled; the King's Guards were eventually persuaded to surrender when two of their officers had been conducted to a nearby eminence from which they could see that the rest of the army they belonged to had been swept from the field or had already surrendered.

=== Later life ===
He returned to England with Charles II in 1660, and after the Restoration Careless was granted (with 2 others) the lucrative proceeds of tax on hay and straw brought into London and Westminster, the right to sell ballast to shipping on the Thames and the office of inspector of livery horsekeepers (1661). In 1660 Careless, along with Charles Giffard and others who helped in King Charles' escape, was proposed as a knight of The Order of the Royal Oak and was listed under those persons resident in London and Middlesex. As for all proposed knights Careless' income was recorded, and this was £800.00 per annum. Charles II was persuaded that the new order of chivalry would prove politically and socially divisive as it only rewarded those who had aided him in adversity and those who were ardent Royalists. He therefore reluctantly abandoned the scheme.

Careless was made a Gentleman of the Privy Chamber in 1666. Gentlemen of the Privy Chamber were empowered to execute the King's verbal command without producing any written order; their person and character being deemed sufficient authority. With his close friend Charles Giffard, Careless was prominent in petitioning the king for favour on behalf of various people involved in the escape of Charles II after Worcester, or their dependants. Many of these petitions were successful and they materially benefitted friends and former neighbours of Careless.

In 1678, along with other Catholics who aided King Charles after Worcester, he was made exempt from all anti-Catholic legislation. Careless was evidently loyal to King Charles' successor, James II, as he was paid a bounty of £300 from that monarch's secret service fund in 1687.

Sources variously give Careless the rank of captain, major and colonel. In the historical tract "Boscobel" it is stated that Careless was a major at the time of the Battle of Worcester. It would appear that he was promoted to colonel sometime between 1651 and 1656, when he is first recorded as holding the rank. However, it is possible that he was acting as the major for his regiment in 1651 whilst holding the substantive rank of colonel.

Colonel William Careless is recorded as living in Hallow, Worcestershire in the 1680s; he died in London, and was buried in his native Brewood, 28 May 1689. A memorial to William Careless is to be found in the church of St Mary the Virgin and St Chad, Brewood; he is believed to be buried in the churchyard though his original monument no longer exists; a replacement headstone was erected in Victorian times.

== Family ==
William Careless married the sister of Sampson Fox, who was a trooper under his command, and also a Roman Catholic. His sons were: William, born c. 1631, who became a Jesuit priest (admitted to the Jesuit College in Rome in 1655 under the name Dorrington) died 26 Jan 1679, Thomas, born c.1640, died 19 May 1665, and an adopted son, Edward Carlos (the eldest son of his brother John), born 6 October 1664, died 10 September 1713. His son William was in exile in Lower Germany with his father after 1645 and fought beside him at Worcester. He was separated from his father during the battle and made his way to London. His religious vocation was inspired by witnessing the execution of Saint John Southworth. A signed document dating to 1655 shows that William was using the surname Carlos at this date, before his father's officially recognised name change.

The Careless family of Brewood lost most of their land and social prominence in the 1720s when Charles Carlos, the eldest son of the Edward adopted by Colonel William Careless, squandered his inheritance. Charles is described in a court case as having "impoverished the [Broom Hall] estate." On 6 April 1716 Charles Carlos (under the name Charles Careless) petitioned, along with other Catholic descendants of those who aided Charles II in his escape, the protection of George I against anti-Catholic legislation.

== Legacy ==
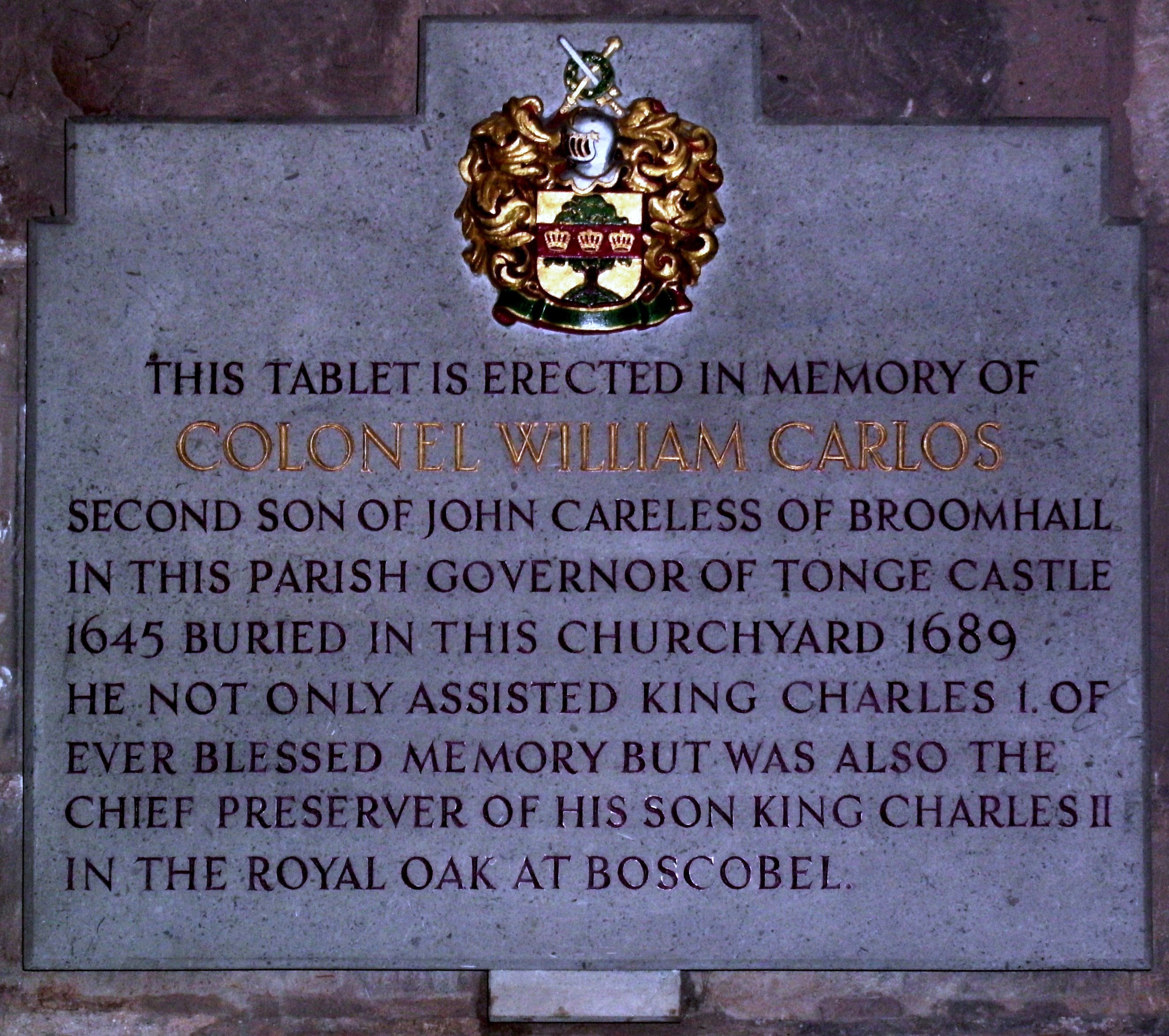
Modern memorial tablet to William Careless, Brewood parish church.

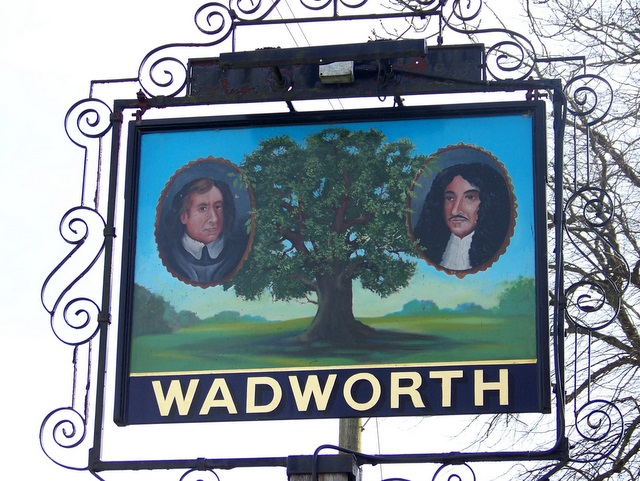
Careless and Charles II with the Royal Oak on a sign at the Royal Oak Pub, Corsley Heath

In 2013 a memorial plaque to William Careless (as William Carlos) was attached to the base of a statue of Charles II, by Grinling Gibbons, in the grounds of the Royal Hospital Chelsea.

Oak Apple Day or Royal Oak Day was a national holiday celebrated in England for a number of centuries, on 29 May, to commemorate the restoration of the English monarchy. The oak symbolism referenced Careless' successful ploy of hiding Charles II in the oak tree at Boscobel.

A commemorative medal was struck with the inscription "GOD . BLES . MY . LORD . WILMOT . LADY . LANE . COL . CARLES . CAPT . TEDERSAL." the names are those of the principal persons who aided Charles II in his escape after Worcester. The medal shows (obverse) a view of the walls and fortifications of Worcester with defenders; outside, Charles on horseback attended by the four Penderels and Yates, and before him a company of soldiers (British Museum catalogue: MB1p394.19).

The income granted to the Penderel brothers is still paid to some of their descendants to this day. However, of the payment, from the various sources of income bestowed by Charles II, which was granted to the descendants of the heirs of William Careless some was suspended by the British government in 1822, and the remainder early in the 20th century.

== Fiction ==
William Careless appears as a very prominent character in the novel Boscobel: or the Royal Oak: A Tale of the Year 1651 by William Harrison Ainsworth, first published in 1872. As William Carlis, he is also found in Royal Escape (1938), a historical novel by Georgette Heyer.
