= HMY Royal Escape =

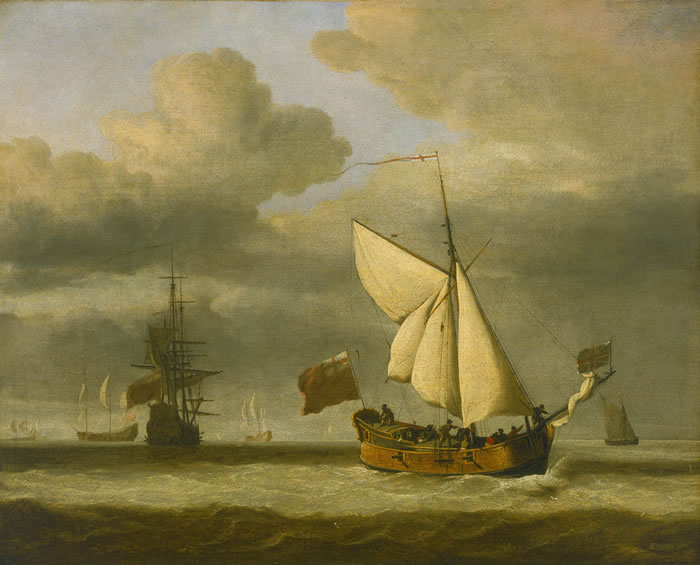
- The Royal Escape, painted by Willem van de Velde the Younger

History

England
- Name: HMY Royal Escape
- Acquired: 1660
- Commissioned: 26 July 1672
- Renamed: Originally named Surprise
- Fate: Sold in 1750

General characteristics
- Class & type: Royal yacht
- Tons burthen: 3359/94 (bm)
- Length: 41 ft 8 in (12.70 m)
- Beam: 14 ft 5 in (4.39 m)
- Depth of hold: 7 ft (2.1 m)

General characteristics after 1736 rebuild
- Tons burthen: 49 24/94 (bm)
- Length: 52 ft (16 m)
- Beam: 15 ft 5 in (4.70 m)
- Draught: 7 ft 0 in (2.13 m)
- Depth of hold: 7 ft 6 in (2.29 m)

HMY Royal Escape was a royal yacht owned by King Charles II. She was the former collier Surprise that had carried the king across the Channel to safety.

King Charles took passage on Surprise after the defeat of the royalist cause in 1651, narrowly avoiding pursuing Parliamentarian forces. He arrived safely in France, where he lived in exile until the Restoration in 1660. On his return Charles purchased the ship he had travelled on, naming her after his escape from England nearly a decade before. He kept her moored close to his palace, showing her to visitors. The ship remained on the Navy Lists for many years, being sold finally in 1750, although several other vessels continued the name until 1877.

== King Charles's escape ==
After the royalist defeat at the Battle of Worcester on 3 September 1651 King Charles II escaped and fled from the Parliamentarian forces who had orders to arrest him. He travelled eventually to Brighton, where he met the captain of a collier, Nicholas Tettersell, and arranged passage to France. Tettersell was the only person who was to know Charles's identity; the crew were told that the passengers were merchants fleeing their creditors. Tettersell agreed to make the passage, and safely landed the royal party at Fécamp on his ship, the Surprise.

== Return ==
Charles remained fond of the ship that had helped his escape, and on his return to England at the Restoration in 1660, purchased her, renaming her Royal Escape. Charles had her moored in the Thames off the Palace of Whitehall, where he would show her off to other royalty. She was entered on the Navy List as a smack, 30 ft (9.1 m) long, with a beam of 14 ft 6 in (4.42 m), and drawing 7 ft (2.1 m).

She was retained on the navy lists for a number of years, being rebuilt in 1714 and 1736 as a transport. She was sold in 1750, though the name was perpetuated when a previously unnamed mooring lighter was renamed Royal Escape in 1749. This later craft was broken up in 1791, and a new Royal Escape was launched in 1792. This vessel, a transport, was broken up in 1877.
