= The George Inn, Bridport =

Building in Bridport, Dorset, England

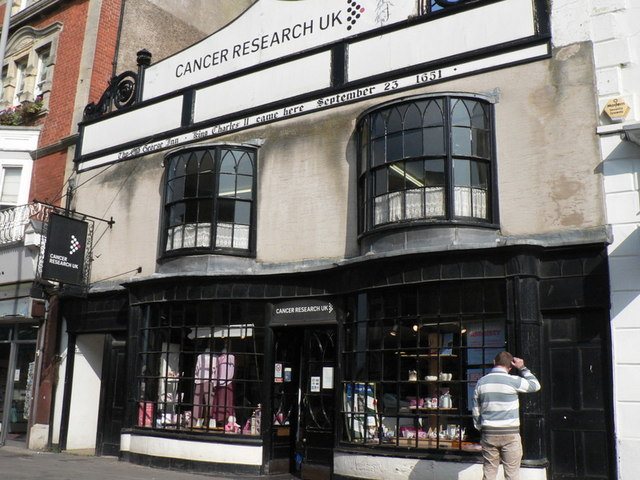
The building pictured in 2008

The George Inn is a historic building in the town of Bridport, Dorset, England.

== History ==
The inn contains 16th or 17th century features but dates mostly from the early 19th century.

King Charles II stayed at the inn on 23 September 1651 on his way to escape to France.

In 1984, the inn was made a Grade II-listed building. Presently, the building is used by Cancer Research UK.
