= Escape of Charles II =

Flight of Charles II from England in 1651

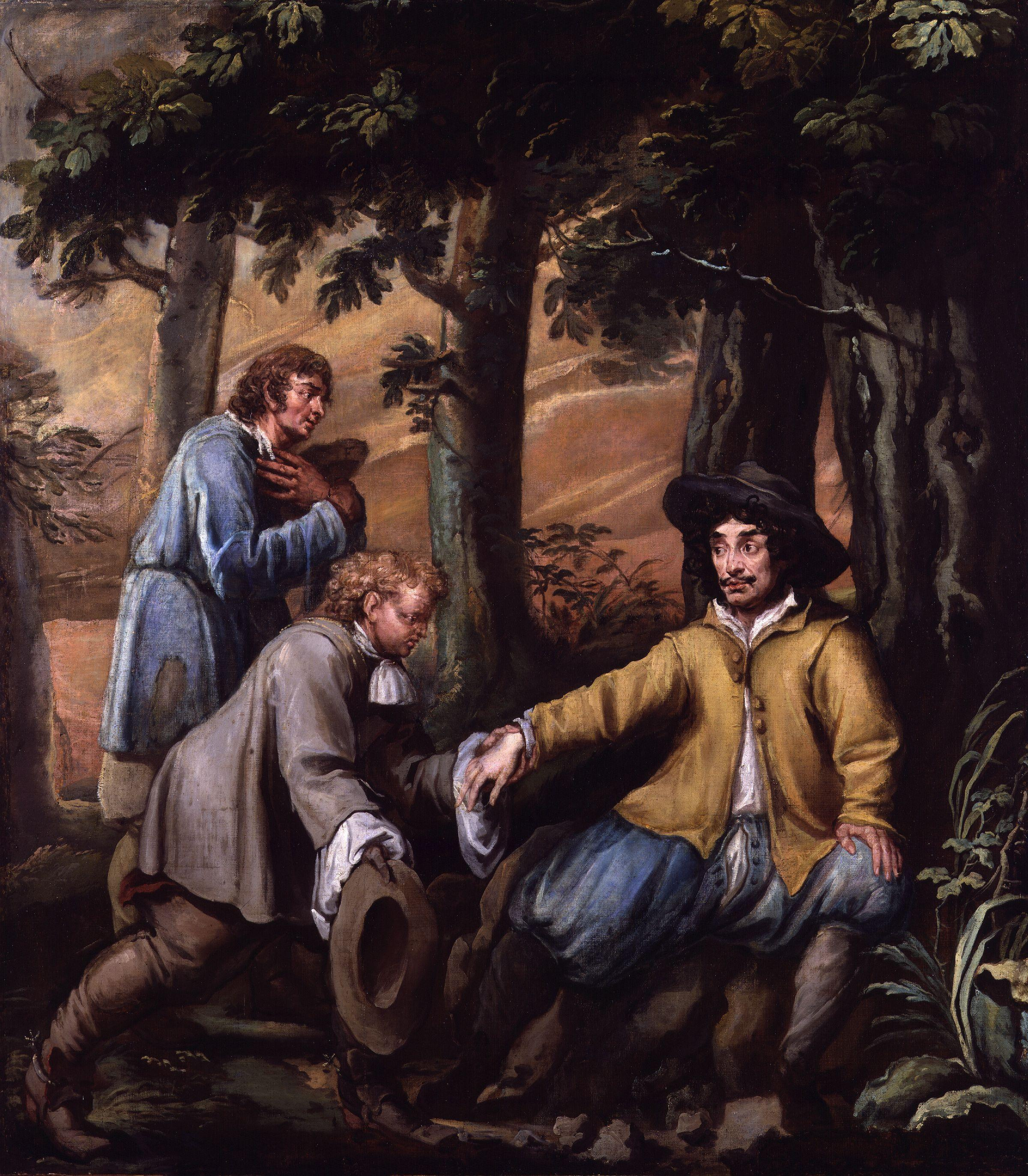
King Charles II in Boscobel Wood by Isaac Fuller

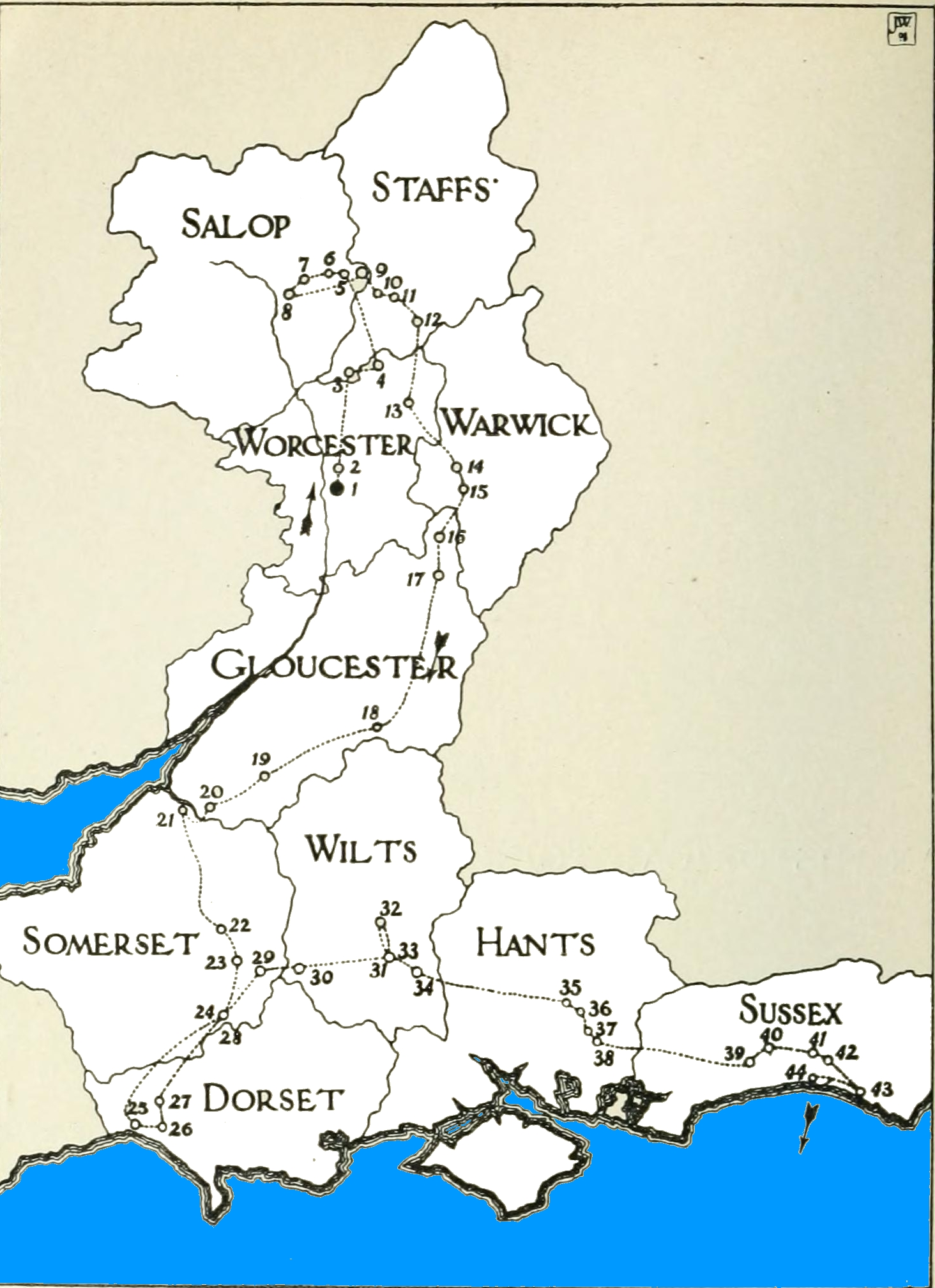
Map of the route taken: • 1 Worcester • 2 Barbon Bridge • 3 Kinver Heath • 4 Stourbridge • 5 White Ladies • 6 Hobbal Grange • 7 Evelith • 8 Madeley • 9 Boscobel • 10 Pendeford • 11 Moseley • 12 Bentley • 13 Bromsgrove • 14 Wooton • 15 Stratford • 16 Long Marston • 17 Campden • 18 Cirencester • 19 Sodbury • 20 Bristol • 21 Abbots Leigh • 22 Burton • 23 Castle Cary • 24 Trent • 25 Charmouth • 26 Bridport • 27 Broadwindsor • 28 Trent • 29 Wincanton • 30 Mere • 31 Heale • 32 Stonehenge • 33 Heale • 34 Clarendon Park • 35 Warnford • 36 Old Winchester • 37 Broadhalfpenny • 38 Hambledon • 39 Arundel • 40 Houghton • 41 Bramber • 42 Beeding • 43 Brighton • 44 Shoreham

After the final defeat of the Royalists in the English Civil War against Oliver Cromwell's New Model Army at the Battle of Worcester on 3 September 1651, the future Charles II of England (already by that time King of Scotland) was forced to flee England. With the support of a network of Royalist gentry, Charles first attempted to escape into Wales, then to Bristol disguised as a servant, then to the south coast at Charmouth. Finally, he rode east to Shoreham from where he sailed for France on 15 October 1651. During the six-week flight, he passed through numerous English counties, and at one point was forced to hide in an oak tree on the grounds of a house that was being searched by Parliamentarian soldiers. A £1000 reward had been offered for information leading to Charles's capture.

== Charles's escape ==
=== Flight from Worcester ===
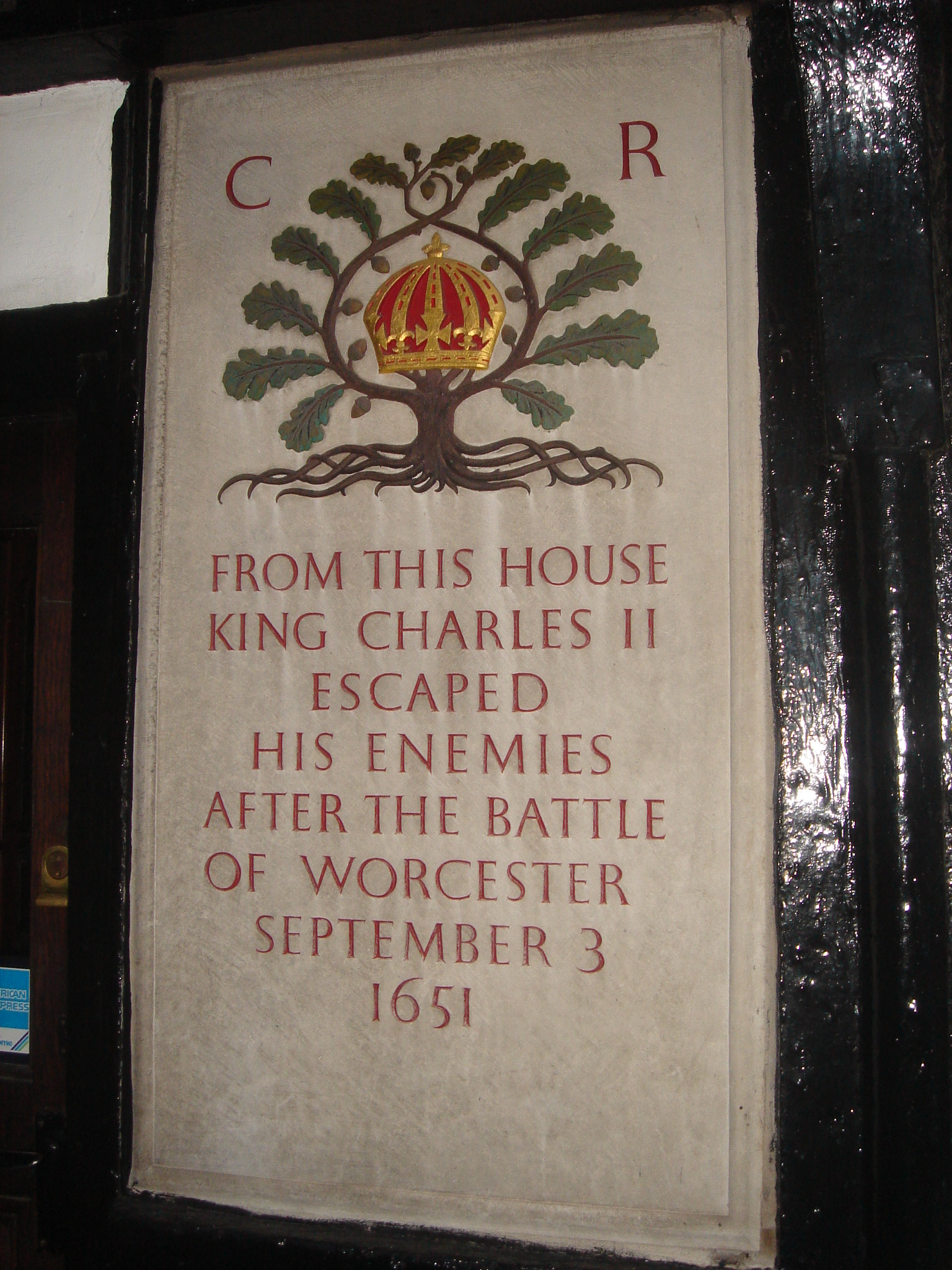
Plaque outside King Charles House pub, New Street, in Worcester

After the Battle of Worcester on 3 September 1651, Charles returned to his lodgings in Worcester, escaping by the back door as the Parliamentary forces arrived. He fled the city by St Martin's Gate to the north, in the company of Lord Wilmot, Lord Derby, Charles Giffard (or Gifford), and others. Charles wanted to travel to London rather than Scotland, which was the preferred destination of the majority of the party. He told only Wilmot of his plan, arranging to meet at the Three Cranes Tavern. At this point, night was falling, he had no shelter, and he needed the support of his small band of loyal officers.

The royal party, in all about sixty mounted officers, initially headed north from Worcester, though their exact route is uncertain. The earliest written account is that of Blount, who mentions "Kinver Heath not far from Kidderminster" and Stourbridge. The group may have been the party of fugitives observed by Richard Baxter passing through Kidderminster. One interpretation identifies Kinver Heath as the heath of which Kinver Edge is a remnant, in which case the party would probably have crossed Cookley bridge and passed through Blakeshall. However, they would be unlikely to have gone from there to Stourbridge, as this would have involved them turning sharply east. An alternative explanation is that the heath in question was that in the eastern part of the parish of Kinver, east of Caunsall, Whittington, Dunsley, and including Iverley. This extends beyond the boundary towards, Hagley, Pedmore, Oldswinford, and Wollaston. Willis-Bund's interpretation was that they took the direct route to Stourbridge, though Hagley, but that would not have taken them through Kidderminster nor over anything that could be called Kinver Heath.

At Kinver Heath, the party conferred and Lord Derby suggested Boscobel House in Shropshire as a safe place of refuge. Derby had been sheltered there the previous week by the Catholic tenants, the five Pendrell brothers, after the Battle of Wigan Lane. The owner of Boscobel, Charles Giffard, who was himself accompanying the group, agreed but suggested that another house on his estate, White Ladies Priory, would be safer than Boscobel House itself.

Having agreed on this plan, the party diverted towards Stourbridge. The town was garrisoned by Parliamentary troops but Charles was able to pass without the alarm being sounded. Heading north again, the party stopped briefly at Wordsley before arriving at White Ladies in the early hours of 4 September.

=== Boscobel, and attempt to escape to Wales ===
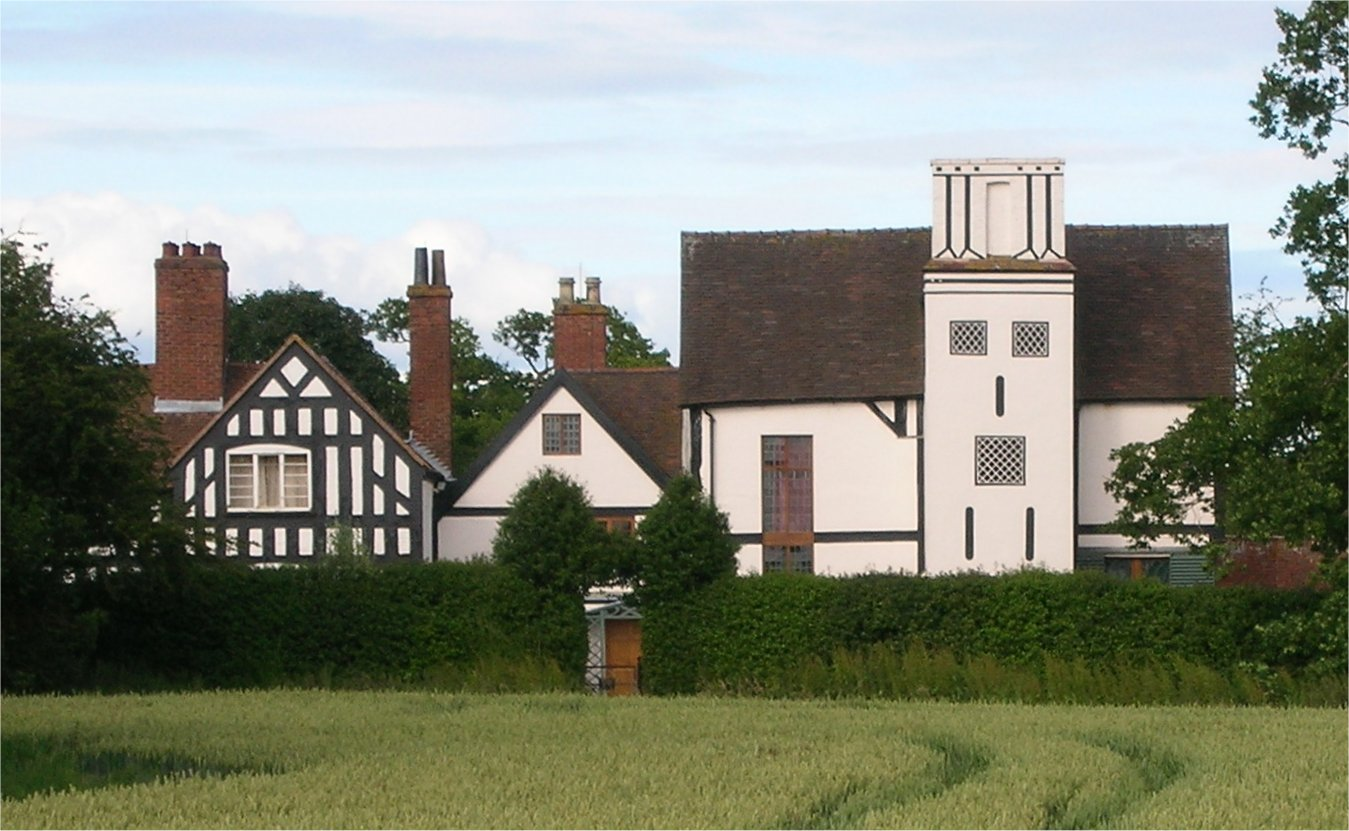
Boscobel House, Shropshire

At White Ladies, the King was met by George Pendrell. He contacted his brother Richard who farmed at Hobbal Grange, near Tong. Together, they disguised the King as a farm labourer, "in leather doublet, a pair of green breeches and a jump-coat ... of the same green, ... an old grey greasy hat without a lining [and] a noggen shirt, of the coarsest linen"; and Richard cut the King's hair, leaving it short on top but long at the sides. However, it was now felt that it would be safer for the King to travel almost alone and so all his followers, apart from Lord Wilmot, were persuaded to leave.

At dawn and in pouring rain, Charles was moved out of White Ladies into the nearby Spring Coppice on the estate, hiding there with Richard Pendrell. Shortly afterwards, a company of local militia stopped at White Ladies asking if the King had been seen. The soldiers were told he had journeyed on some time before; convinced, they passed on, but were seen by Charles as they rode by. Charles recalled: "In this wood I stayed all day without meat or drink and by great fortune it rained all the time which hindered them, as I believe, from coming into the wood to search for men that might be fled there".

The Pendrells taught Charles how to speak with a local accent and how to walk like a labourer. They explained they knew no way to safely get him to London, but that they knew of a Francis Wolfe who lived near the River Severn, and whose house, Madeley Court, had several hiding places. After dark, Richard Pendrell took Charles to Hobball Grange, where he had a meal, then immediately set off for Madeley, hoping to cross the River Severn into Wales where the Royalists had strong support. At Evelith Mill, they were challenged by the local miller and the pair fled, though it later transpired that the miller was himself a Royalist who was hiding some members of the defeated army. Charles and Richard arrived at Madeley Court close to midnight on 5 September.

At Madeley, Wolfe told Richard and the King that his house was no longer safe, but he provided a barn for Charles to hide in while Richard and Wolfe scouted the Severn crossings. They found that the river was closely guarded, and Charles and Richard were forced to return to Boscobel, wading through a stream along the way and stopping at White Ladies where they learned Lord Wilmot was safe at nearby Moseley Hall. Progress was hampered by Charles' sore and bleeding feet, the shoes that had been provided for him being of coarse leather and far too small. They reached Boscobel House at close to 3 in the morning of 6 September, when Charles's feet were tended to.

=== Refuge in an oak tree ===
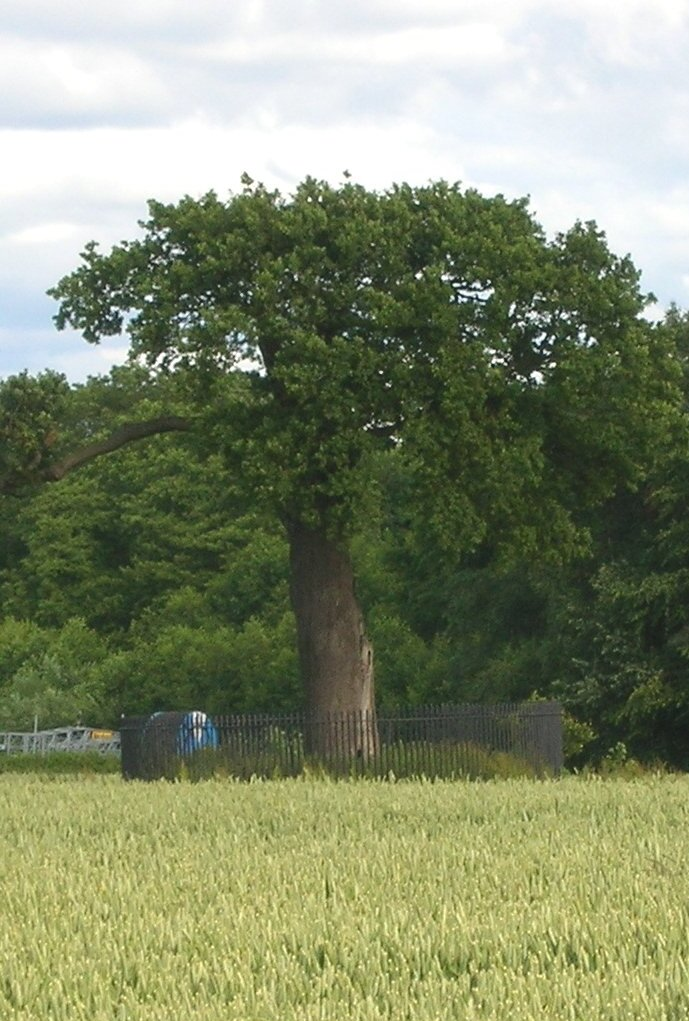
A descendant of the Royal Oak at Boscobel House

Colonel William Careless (or Carlis), who had fought at Worcester, had also arrived at Boscobel House. At Careless's suggestion, he and the King spent the day of 6 September hiding in a nearby oak tree (the Royal Oak), while Parliamentary troops searched the surrounding woodland. The exhausted King slept for some of the time, supported by Careless who, when his arms became tired, was "constrained ... to pinch His Majesty to the end he might awaken him to prevent his present danger". They returned to Boscobel House that evening.

Meanwhile, another Pendrell brother, Humphrey, reported that while at the local militia headquarters he had been interrogated by a Parliamentary colonel, who questioned him about whether the King had been at White Ladies; however, Humphrey had convinced the officer he had never been there. The Colonel reminded Humphrey of the £1000 reward for information leading to the King's capture and of the "penalty for concealing the King, which was death without mercy". This further emphasised the importance of getting Charles out of the country as soon as possible. Charles spent the night in one of Boscobel's priest holes.

=== Moseley Hall ===
At the suggestion of Lord Wilmot, Charles left Boscobel for Moseley Hall late in the evening of 7 September, riding an old horse that had been provided by the miller, Humphrey Pendrell. The King was accompanied by all five Pendrell brothers and Francis Yates (servant to Charles Giffard and brother-in-law to the Pendrells). Soon after leaving Boscobel the horse stumbled, and Humphrey Pendrell joked that it was "not to be wondered at, for it had the weight of three Kingdoms upon its back". The party stopped at Pendeford Mill where Charles dismounted, it being unsafe to continue riding. Three of the brothers took the horse back, while Richard and John Pendrell along with Francis Yates continued with the King to Moseley Hall.

At Moseley, the home of Thomas Whitgrave, Charles was given a meal and dry clothes, and Whitgrave's Catholic priest, John Huddleston, bathed the King's bruised and bleeding feet. Touched, Charles told Huddleston, "If it please God I come to my crown, both you and all your persuasion shall have as much liberty as any of my subjects". Charles spent the night and the next two days hiding at Moseley Hall, sleeping in a bed for the first time since 3 September. Later that morning he saw some of his fleeing Scottish troops passing by.

When Parliamentary troops arrived at the Hall Charles was hurriedly hidden in a priest hole, secreted behind the wall of a bedroom. The troops accused Whitgrave of fighting for the King at Worcester (which he had not, though he had fought as a Royalist before being wounded and captured at Naseby in 1645). Whitgrave convinced the troops that he was too feeble to aid any Royalist fugitives, and they departed without searching the house.

=== Attempt to escape via Bristol ===
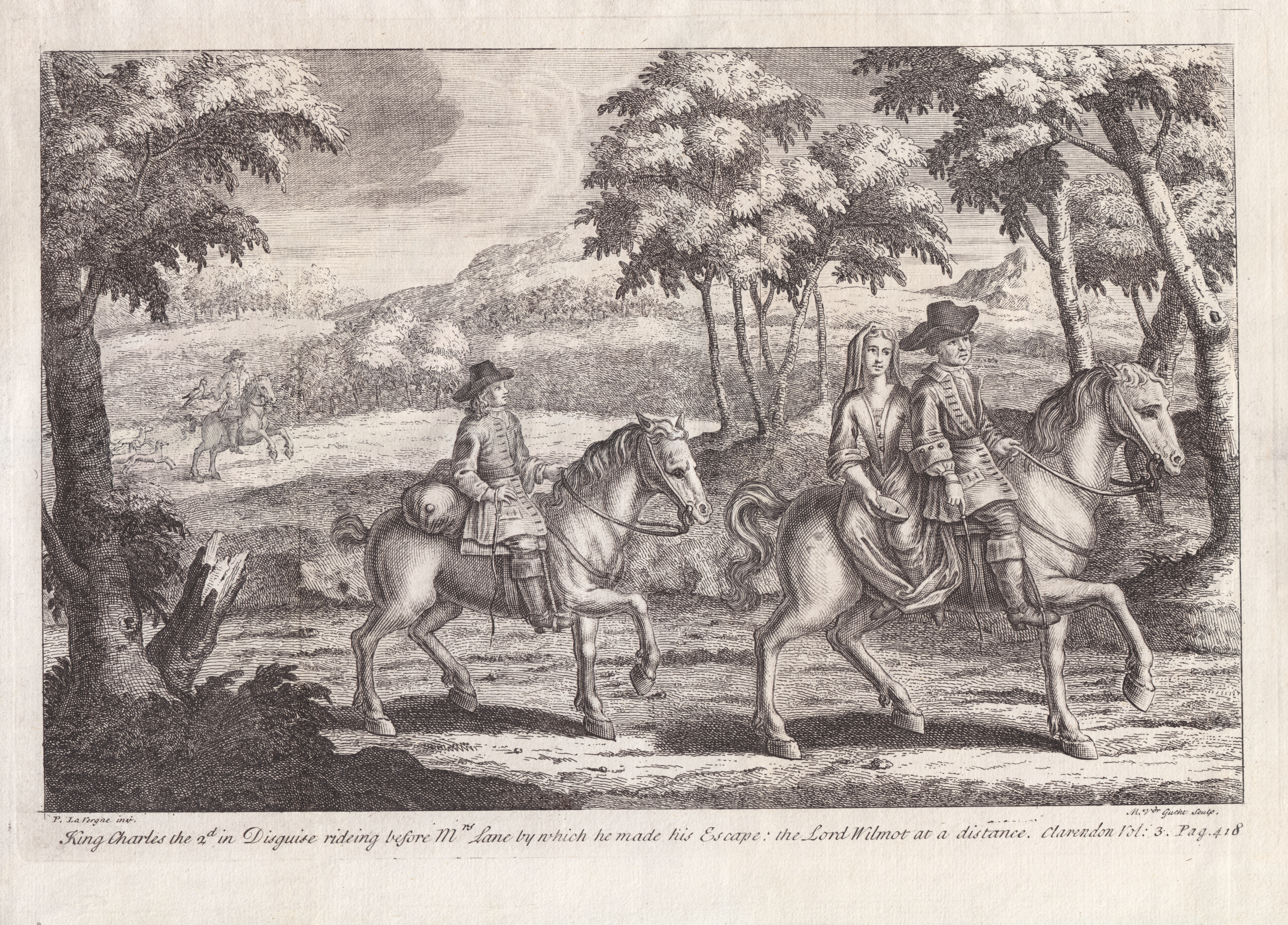
"King Charles the 2^{d} in Disguise rideing before M^{rs} Lane by which he made his Escape; the Lord Wilmor at a distance." from Clarendon's History of the Rebellion (1731 reprint)

The King now no longer felt safe at Moseley Hall and Wilmot suggested that he should move on to Bentley Hall near Walsall, the residence of Colonel John Lane, a colonel in the Royalist Army since 1642, and his sister Jane Lane. Wilmot had learned that Jane had obtained a permit allowing herself and a servant to travel to Abbots Leigh in Somerset to visit a friend, Ellen Norton, who was expecting a baby. Abbots Leigh lay just across the Avon Gorge from the important seaport of Bristol, and Wilmot proposed that the King should take advantage of the permit, travel to Bristol disguised as Jane's servant, and from there take a ship to France. Shortly after midnight on 10 September the King left for Bentley Hall, arriving there in the early hours.

Charles was dressed as a tenant farmer's son and adopted the alias 'William Jackson' for the next part of his journey. The party set out, Charles riding the same horse as Jane Lane. They were accompanied by Withy Petre (Jane Lane's sister), her husband John Petre, and Henry Lascelles, another related Royalist officer. Wilmot refused to travel in disguise; he rode half a mile ahead of the party and said that if challenged he would claim to be out hunting. The party rode through Rowley Regis then Quinton to Bromsgrove. At Bromsgrove they found that the horse ridden by Charles and Jane had lost a shoe. The King, playing the role of servant, took the horse to a blacksmith. The King, when he later recounted his story to Samuel Pepys and others, said "As I was holding my horse's foot, I asked the smith what news. He told me that there was no news that he knew of, since the good news of the beating the rogues of the Scots. I asked him whether there was none of the English taken that joined with the Scots, He answered he did not hear if that rogue, Charles Stuart, were taken; but some of the others, he said, were taken. I told him that if that rogue were taken, he deserved to be hanged more than all the rest, for bringing in the Scots. Upon which he said I spoke like an honest man; and so we parted".

The party reached Wootton Wawen where cavalry of the New Model Army had gathered outside the inn. Here John and Withy Petre went ahead of the party. The King, Jane Lane and Henry Lascelles with great coolness rode through the troops. The party continued through Stratford-upon-Avon, and on to Long Marston where they spent the night of 10 September at the house of John Tomes, another relation of Jane's. Here, in keeping with his guise as a servant, the cook put him to work in the kitchen winding up the jack used to roast meat in the fireplace. Charles was clumsy at this, and the cook asked him, "What countryman are you that you know not how to wind up a jack?" Charles excused himself by saying that as the son of poor people he so rarely ate meat that he did not know how to use a roasting jack. His story was accepted and he was not identified.

On 11 September they continued through Chipping Campden and on to Cirencester, where they spent the night. The next morning they travelled on to Chipping Sodbury and then to Bristol, arriving at Leigh Court, the residence of George and Ellen Norton in Abbots Leigh, late on the afternoon of 12 September. The Nortons remained unaware of the King's identity during his three-day stay. However, the butler, Pope, who had been a Royalist soldier, immediately recognised him. Charles confirmed his identity to Pope, who later admitted Wilmot into the house unobserved. Pope also attempted to find a ship for the King at the port of Bristol, but discovered none would be sailing to France for another month. While at Abbots Leigh, Charles deflected suspicion by asking a servant, who had been in the King's personal guard at the Battle of Worcester, to describe the King's appearance and clothing at the battle. The man looked at Charles and said, "The King was at least three fingers taller than [you]".

Since no ships were to be found, Pope suggested the King find refuge at the home of Colonel Francis Wyndham, another Royalist officer, who lived forty miles away in the village of Trent near Sherborne on the Somerset/Dorset border. The Wyndham family were known to both Wilmot and Charles, as the daughter of the King's old nurse had married the elder Wyndham brother Edmund. Charles and Wilmot decided to make for the south coast with Jane. However, Mrs Norton suddenly went into labour and bore a stillborn infant. As Jane could not now leave Abbots Leigh without raising suspicion, Pope forged a letter to Jane informing her of her father's serious illness and stating that she was required at home.

On the morning of 16 September Charles set out for Castle Cary where he spent the night. The next day he arrived at Trent.

=== Trent to Charmouth and back – attempt to escape via Charmouth ===
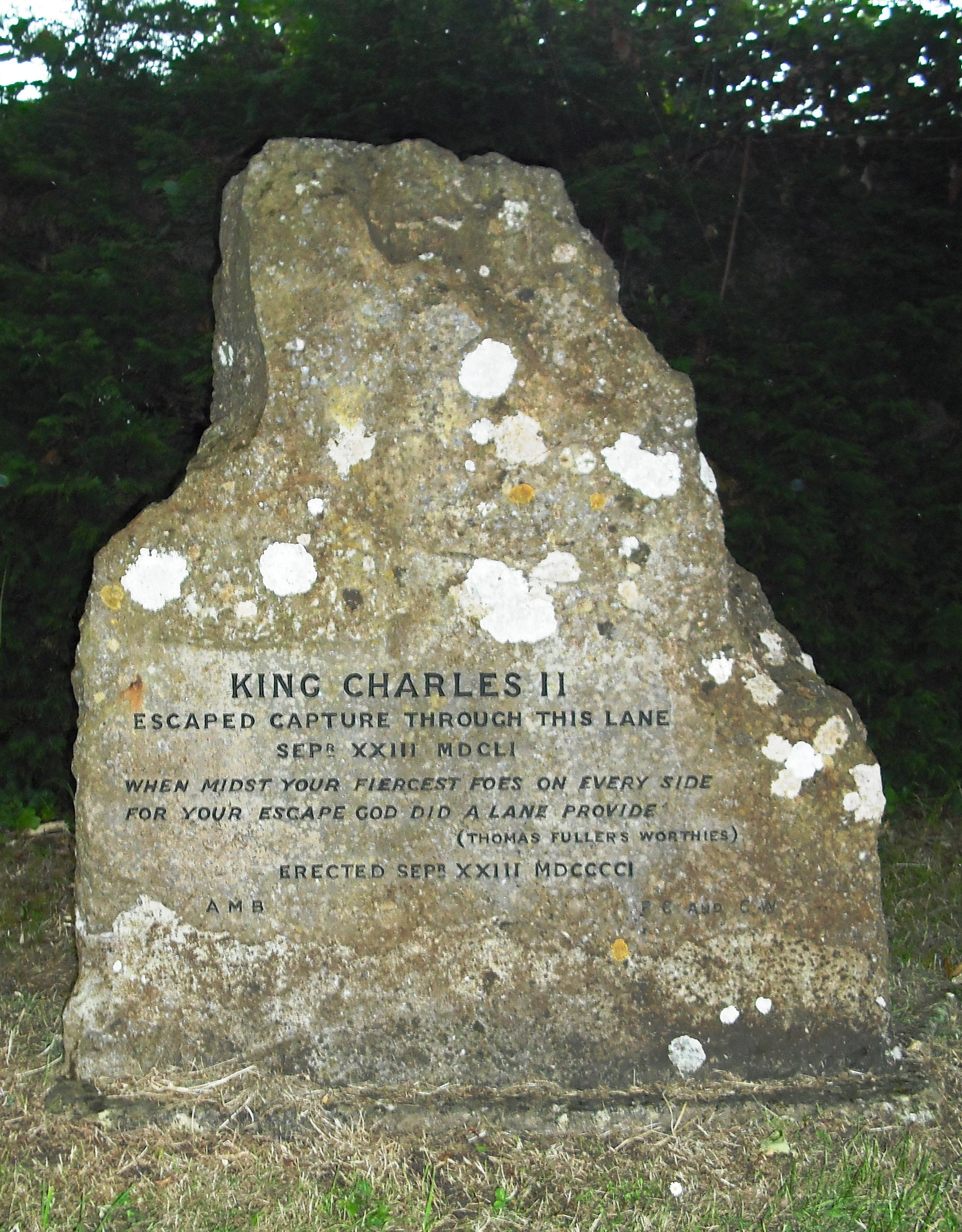
King Charles II Escape Memorial in Lee Lane, Bridport, Dorset

The King spent the next few days at Trent House while Wyndham and Wilmot attempted to find a ship from Lyme Regis or Weymouth. Wyndham contacted Captain Ellesdon, a friend in Lyme Regis, one of whose tenants, Stephen Limbry, was sailing from Charmouth to Saint-Malo the following week. Charles and Wilmot, it was decided, could board the vessel in the guise of merchants travelling to recover money from a debtor.

At Charmouth, Charles waited at the Queen's Arms Inn for Wilmot to negotiate with Captain Limbry to take them to France. To explain the party's need to depart quietly at night, the landlady was told in confidence that her guests were an eloping couple (Wyndham's cousin and Wilmot posing respectively as bride and groom), with Charles as their manservant. Limbry did not appear, however, having (according to him) been locked in his bedroom by his wife, who was afraid for his safety.

Stranded on the beach at dawn, with no sign of the promised boat, Charles and Wyndham decided to head to nearby Bridport, hoping to find out there what had happened to Limbry. When they arrived they discovered that the town was filled with Parliamentary troops about to sail for Jersey. Charles boldly walked through the soldiers to the best inn and arranged for rooms. The ostler confronted the King, saying "Sure, Sir, I know your face", but Charles convinced him that he and the ostler had both been servants at the same time for a Mr Potter of Exeter.

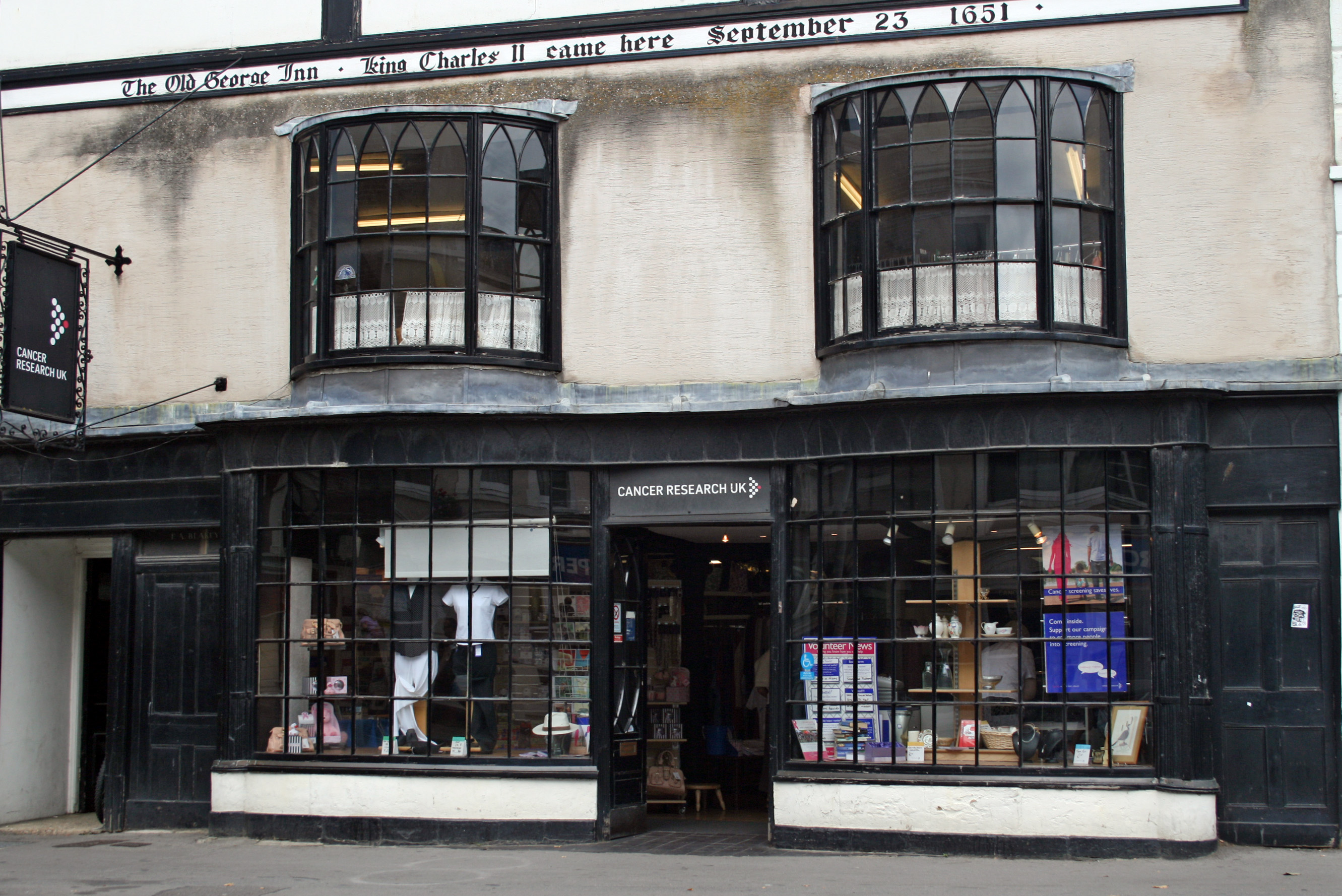
The George Inn, Bridport, where the King stayed in September 1651.

Wilmot meanwhile had remained behind in Charmouth after his horse had lost a shoe. The inn's ostler, a veteran Parliamentary soldier, became suspicious – and had his suspicions confirmed when a blacksmith told him that one of the horse's shoes had been forged in Worcestershire. Learning that the "eloping couple" had departed for Bridport, the ostler informed his commanding officer, who rode after them. Wilmot, also trying to find the King in Bridport, had gone to the wrong inn. He sent a servant to find Charles and passed word that they should meet up outside the town. On meeting, they agreed that they should return to Trent in view of the considerable number of troops in the locality. Taking a small country road (Lee Lane) heading north they narrowly missed a party of troops who were riding from Charmouth. A modern memorial stone in Lee Lane commemorates the narrow escape.

Losing their way, Charles and Wilmot decided to stop overnight in the village of Broadwindsor, at The George Inn. That evening, the local constable arrived with forty soldiers who were to be billeted at the inn, en route to Jersey. Fortunately for Charles, attention was diverted by one of the women travelling with the soldiers going into labour, allowing the King to escape the next morning and return to Trent House.

=== Trent to Shoreham, and escape to France ===
Charles spent the next twelve nights at Trent House while a passage to France continued to be sought. The night of his return to the house, he had met a cousin of Edward Hyde's who knew Colonel Edward Phelips of Montacute House. Wyndham himself suggested the aid of his friend John Coventry, son of the former Lord Keeper of the Great Seal. Contacted by Wilmot, both Phelips and Coventry pledged themselves to Charles's service. Passage was booked on a ship from Southampton on 29 September, but that became impossible when the ship was commandeered to transport troops to Jersey. Phelips, Coventry and Doctor Henchman of Salisbury Cathedral decided to try the Sussex coast, and contacted Colonel George Gunter of Racton, between Havant and Chichester.

On 6 October the King, Julia Coningsby and Henry Peters (Wyndham's servant) left Trent for Heale House at Woodford, between Salisbury and Amesbury, the home of Katherine Hyde, widow of Lawrence Hyde MP. No sooner had Charles arrived than he pretended to leave permanently: riding about the district, visiting Stonehenge, and finally returning known only to Mrs Hyde. On 7 October Wilmot visited Colonel Gunter, who found a French merchant, Francis Mancell, now residing in Chichester. Together they made arrangements with Captain Nicholas Tattersell to carry the King and Wilmot from Shoreham in a coal boat Surprise for the sum of £80.

In the early hours of 13 October, the King and Phelips rode from Heale House to Warnford Down, where they met Wilmot and Gunter. From there, the party set out for Hambledon, where Gunter's sister lived and in whose house they stayed for the night. Next day, they rode to the fishing village of Brighthelmstone (now Brighton), fifty miles away, stopping at Houghton for a meal before riding to the village of Bramber, which was filled with soldiers. Gunter decided they would boldly ride through the village. As they were leaving, a party of around fifty soldiers rode rapidly towards them before dashing past and up a narrow lane, giving the travellers a severe fright. At the village of Beeding, Gunter left the group to ride on alone while the rest of the party continued by a different route, meeting Gunter at the George Inn at Brighthelmstone on the evening of 14 October.

Gunter knew that the George Inn was a safe place to spend the night. However, when Captain Tattersell arrived he recognised the King and was furious. His fury drew the attention of the inn-keeper, who also recognised Charles, having once been a servant to his father Charles I. Charles in his turn recognised the inn-keeper and remarked to Gunter that "the fellow knows me and I him; I hope he is an honest fellow". Meanwhile, the angry Tattersell demanded an additional £200 as danger-money. Once the King and Gunter had agreed, Tattersell unreservedly pledged himself to the King's service. The King rested briefly before setting out for the boat at Shoreham, a few miles west.

Around 2 am on 15 October, the King and Wilmot boarded the Surprise, which sailed on the high tide five hours later. Two hours after that, a troop of cavalry arrived in Shoreham to arrest the King, having been given orders to search for "a tall, black man, six feet two inches in height".

The King and Wilmot landed in France at Fécamp, near Le Havre, on the morning of 16 October 1651.

== France, and eventual return to England ==
The next day Charles went to Rouen and then on to Paris to stay with his mother, Queen Henrietta Maria. He did not return to England for nine years.

The death of Oliver Cromwell in 1658 was followed by two years of political confusion, leading to the restoration of the monarchy in 1660. On his return to England in 1660 the King granted a variety of annuities and gifts to some of the people who had aided him, including the Pendrell brothers and Jane Lane. Thomas Whitgrave and Richard Pendrell received annual pensions of £200, with £100 to be paid to the descendants of Richard Pendrell in perpetuity. The other Pendrell brothers received lesser pensions. As of the late 1920s, around 40 Pendrells were receiving pensions, including a Brooklyn laundryman who received $400 per year and a professor of English at the University of British Columbia who got £9/5s/6d. Pensions are still being paid to a number of Pendrell descendants today. At some point the Whitgrave pension lapsed (it may never have actually been paid), as did that of Jane Lane.

Arms awarded to Colonel Careless

Some families who helped the King were awarded coats of arms, or augmentations to existing arms. The arms awarded to Colonel Careless were an oak tree on a gold field with a red fess bearing three royal crowns; the crowns representing the three Kingdoms of England, Scotland and Ireland. The crest is distinguished by a civic crown of oakleaves, encircling a crossed sword and sceptre. The Pendrells employed identical arms, differentiated by colour: a field of silver and a fess of black, the crest incorporating a royal crown in place of the civic crown. The Lanes' coat of arms was augmented with the addition of a canton bearing the three lions of England.

== Aftermath ==
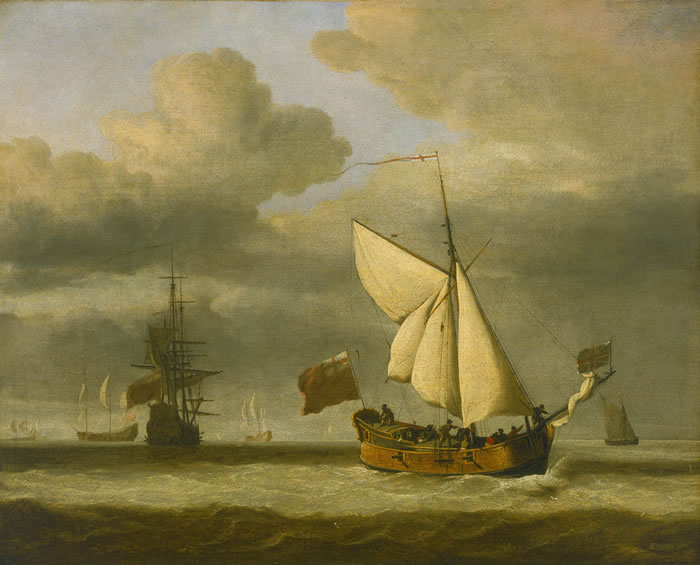
"The Royal Escape Close-Hauled in a Breeze" by Willem van de Velde the Younger

In later years Charles loved to recount the exact details of his escape. The Earl of Clarendon, Charles' doctor George Bate, and Samuel Pepys each recorded what they were told.

During his escape Charles had been brought into intimate terms with ordinary people with whom he would otherwise have had no interaction. The help of the common people seems to have given him a sense that he was genuinely loved, something he would rarely have experienced in his court under normal circumstances.

As Charles II lay dying on the evening of 5 February 1685, his brother and heir the Duke of York brought Father John Huddleston, whom the King had spent time with at Moseley Hall and who was then residing at Somerset House, to his bedside, saying, "Sire, this good man once saved your life. He now comes to save your soul." Charles confirmed that he wished to die in the Roman Catholic Church, and Huddleston heard the King's confession and administered Extreme Unction and the Viaticum. On the accession of James II, Huddleston continued to stay with the Queen Catherine at Somerset House.

Charles purchased the Surprise, the ship he had crossed the Channel on, naming her HMY (His Majesty's Yacht) Royal Escape. She was moored in the Thames off the Palace of Whitehall.

== Commemorations and memorials ==
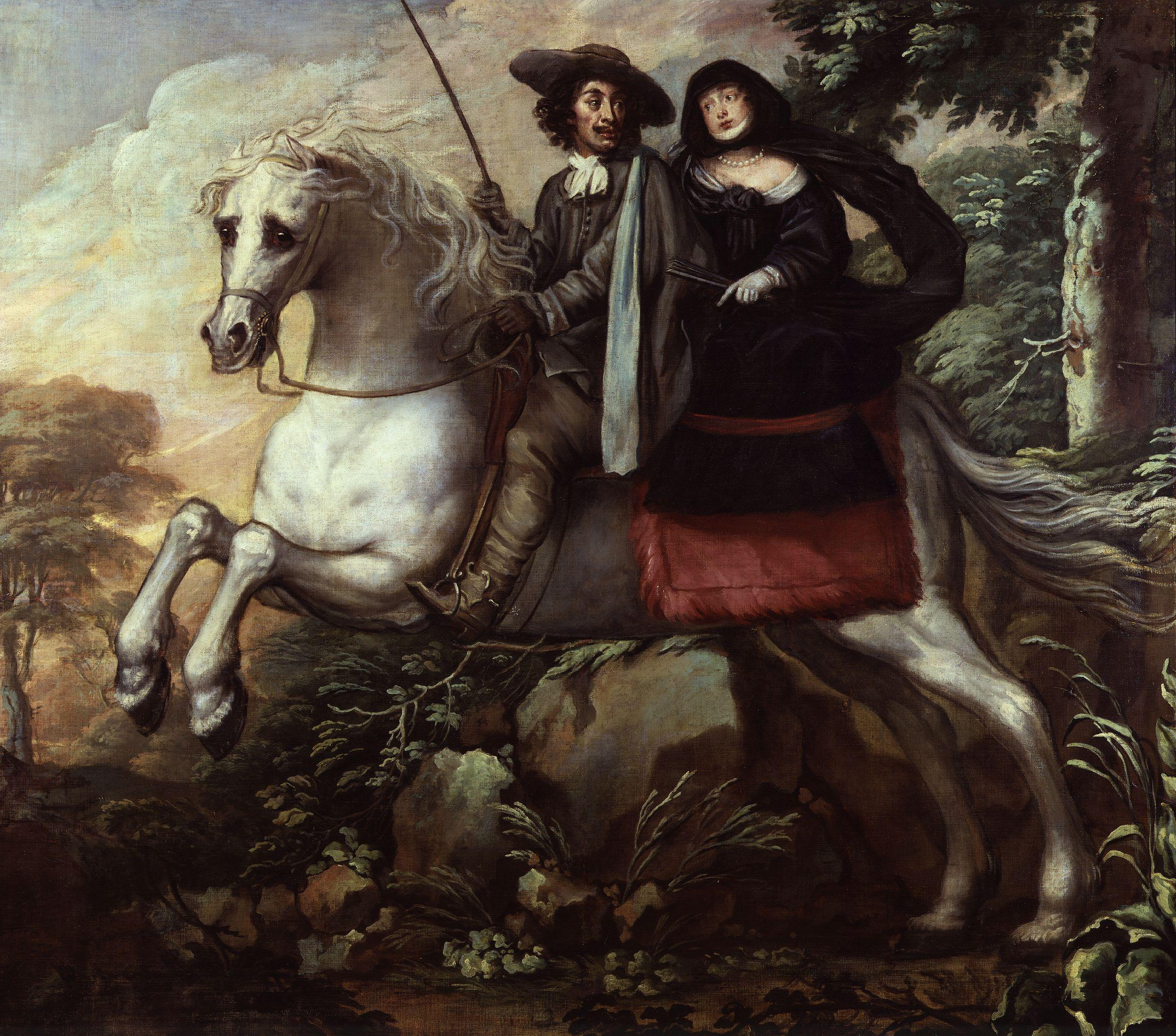
King Charles II and Jane Lane riding to Bristol by Isaac Fuller

- Shortly after the Restoration, Isaac Fuller was commissioned to produce a series of five paintings dealing with the early days of the escape. They record, somewhat imaginatively, The King at Whiteladies, The King in Boscobel Wood, The King and Colonel Careless in the oak tree, King Charles II on Humphrey Penderel's mill horse and King Charles II and Jane Lane riding to Bristol. These were purchased by the National Portrait Gallery, London in 1979.
- In 1664, the King's birthday of 29 May was designated Oak Apple Day, by Act of Parliament and a special service was inserted in the Book of Common Prayer. For over 200 years the King's birthday was celebrated by the wearing of a sprig of oak leaves in remembrance of the events. The tradition is no longer widely observed.
- Hundreds of inns and public houses throughout the country are called 'The Royal Oak', as were eight ships of the Royal Navy.
- The escape from England is commemorated around Oak Apple Day each year with a yacht race from Brighton to Fecamp called The Royal Escape Race and organised by the Sussex Yacht Club.
- Another commemoration takes place each year at the Royal Hospital Chelsea on Founder's Day which takes place close to Oak Apple Day. On Founder's Day, in-pensioners of the Royal Hospital are reviewed by a member of the British Royal Family.
- The Monarch's Way is a 625-mile waymarked footpath which approximately follows the escape route starting at the battlefield at Worcester and finishing at Shoreham.
- The escape is the subject of William Harrison Ainsworth's 1871 novel Boscobel, or, The Royal Oak..
- In 2018, the pop band Barnstormer 1649, headed by Attila the Stockbroker, released a song called "Monarch's Way", based on the events of 1651 from an anti-Royalist viewpoint.
- Georgette Heyer's novel, Royal Escape, published in 1938 is also based on the story.
- Gillian Bagwell's 2011 novel The September Queen recounts the part that Jane Lane played in Charles's escape. The book was released in the United Kingdom 2012 under the title The King's Mistress.
- The Moonraker, a 1958 British swashbuckler film, loosely based on the later days of the escape, was directed by David MacDonald.

== See also ==
- Charles I's journey from Oxford to the Scottish army camp near Newark (27 April 1646 – 5 May 1646) – a similar trip made by his father through hostile territory with only two companions.

== References and bibliography ==
- Bede, Cuthbert (1868). "Charles II.'s flight from Worcester". Notes and Queries (24): 549–550. doi:10.1093/nq/s4-I.24.549.
- Blount, Thomas, ed. (1769). Thomas Blount: Boscobel or the History of His Sacred Majesties Most Miraculous Preservation After the Battle of Worcester, which was Fought Sept. 3, 1651. S. Gamidge. — Available in various formats at Internet Archive, this is the earliest, not entirely reliable account, of the escape of Charles II, first published shortly after the Restoration in 1660.
- Coote, Stephen (2000). Royal Survivor: A Life of Charles II. New York: St. Martin's Press. ISBN 0-312-22687-X.
- Fea, A. (1897, second ed. 1908) The Flight of the King, London.
- Count Grammont (1846). "Chapter: King Charles's escape from Worcester: The Kings own account of his escape and preservation after the Battle of Worcester as dictated to Samuel Pepys at Newmarket on Sunday, October 3d, and Tuesday, October 5th, 1680". In Scott, Sir Walter (ed.). Memoirs of the Court of Charles the Second and the Boscobel Narratives. London: Henry G Bohn. pp. 464, 466.
- Dale, Antony (1989). Brighton Churches. London: Routledge. pp. 10–11. ISBN 0-415-00863-8.
- Fraser, Antonia (1979a). Royal Charles: Charles II and the Restoration. New York: Knopf. p. 122. ISBN 039449721X.
- Fraser, Antonia (1979b). King Charles II. Weidenfeld & Nicolson.
- HPH staff (2007). "History of Pendrell Hall". Pendrell Hall College website. Archived from the original on 12 October 2008.
- Hughes, John, ed. (1857). The Boscobel Tracts: Relating to the Escape of Charles the Second After the Battle of Worcester and his subsequent adventures. William Blackwood and Sons. pp. 162, 166.
- Johnson, R. R.; Kuby, P.J. (2007). Elementary Statistics. Cengage Learning. p. 395.
- Matthews, William, ed. (1966). Pepys Transcription of the Kings Account of his Escape, Charles II's Escape from Worcester. — Presents Pepys's transcription of Charles's account and his edited version side by side, as well as other contemporary accounts.
- Modd, Chris (2001). "The Escape of Charles Stuart After Worcester". Orders of the Day. 33 (4).(subscription required)
- Molloy, J. Fitzgerald (6 February 2013). "CHAPTER II". Royalty Restored or London under Charles II. Project Gutenberg EBook.
- SYC staff (26 May 2014). "Royal Escape Race". Sussex Yacht Club 2013.
- Willis-Bund, John William (1905). The Civil War In Worcestershire, 1642–1646: And the Scotch Invasion Of 1615. Birmingham: The Midland Educational Company. p. 256.
- Horton, Andy (2013). "Royal Escape of King Charles II in 1651". glaucus.org.uk.
- Uglow, J. (2009) A Gambling Man: Charles II and the Restoration, Faber and Faber
- Ollard, Richard (1966). The Escape of Charles II After the Battle of Worcester. New York, Scribner.
- Broadley, A. M. (1912). The Royal Miracle: A Collection of Rare Tracts, Broadsides, Letters, Prints, & Ballads Concerning the Wanderings of Charles II After the Battle of Worcester.—This also chronicles the delightfully daffy 1911 re-enactment of the events.
- Fea., Alan (1908) [1897]. The Flight of the King.
- Fea, Allan (1903). After Worcester Fight.
- H.P. Kingston. "The Wanderings of Charles II in Staffordshire and Shropshire"
- Jean Gordon Hughes. "A King in the Oak Tree"
- Spencer, Charles (2017). To Catch a King: Charles II's Great Escape. William Collins. ISBN 9780008283988.
- Lady Wood (1883). "MS Harl 991, Folo 90: The manner of the King's escape from the battayle of Worcester, as the Lady Wood relates it, who heard the King tell it his mother". In Gomme, George Laurence (ed.). The Gentleman's magazine library: being a classified collection of the chief contents of the Gentleman's magazine from 1731 to 1868. London: E. Stock. pp. 288, 289.
