= Royal Escape =

1938 historical novel by Georgette Heyer

- First edition
- Author: Georgette Heyer
- Language: English
- Genre: Cromwellian, Historical novel
- Publisher: Heinemann
- Publication date: 1938
- Publication place: United Kingdom
- Media type: Print
- Pages: 512 pp
- OCLC: 182621581
- Dewey Decimal: 823/.912 22
- LC Class: PR6015.E795 R63 2008

Royal Escape is a 1938 historical novel by English author Georgette Heyer about the escape of Charles II. It is set in 1651 during the English Commonwealth.

== Plot summary ==
Two years after the execution of his father (Charles I) 21-year-old Charles II and his men fail miserably to free his kingdom from the tyrannical rule of Oliver Cromwell at the Battle of Worcester. The King would rather die trying to restore the monarchy than sit by and watch the power of the English Commonwealth grow under its corrupt leaders. He decides to disguise himself as a peasant; at his first hiding-place at Boscobel, an estate wherein lived five catholic brothers called Pendrell, the King is dressed in a coarse noggen shirt, with breeches of coarse green cloth and a doeskin leather doublet. Charles is given a pair of patched stockings and a long, white, greasy steeple-crowned hat to wear, and his hair is cut to look like a peasant's, short on top but long at the sides. The Pendrells quickly teach Charles how to speak with a local accent and how to walk like a labourer. The novel concerns his daring trek, partly on foot, from Worcester to Shoreham, whence he sails to France to wait for the right time to return to England and claim his kingdom.
