= Royal Oak (disambiguation) =

The Royal Oak was the tree in which Charles II of England hid to escape the Roundheads following the Battle of Worcester in 1651.

Royal Oak or Royal Oaks may also refer to:

== Arts and entertainment ==
- The Royal Oak (film), a 1923 British film directed by Maurice Elvey
- "Royal Oak", a 17th-century English tune, often used for "All Things Bright and Beautiful"

== Businesses and organisations ==
=== Pubs ===
- Royal Oak, Bexleyheath, Kent, England
- Royal Oak, Cardiff, Wales
- Royal Oak, Chesterfield, Derbyshire, England
- Royal Oak, Eccles, Salford, England
- Royal Oak, Frindsbury, Kent
- Royal Oak, Gillamoor, North Yorkshire, England
- The Royal Oak, Meavy, Devon, England
- Royal Oak, Oldham, Greater Manchester, England
- Royal Oak, Wigan, Greater Manchester
- Royal Oak Arms Hotel, New South Wales, Australia
- Royal Oak Hotel, Balmain, Sydney, Australia
- Royal Oak Hotel, Garstang, Lancashire, England
- The Royal Oak, Edinburgh, Scotland
- The Royal Oak, Hail Weston, Cambridgeshire, England
- The Royal Oak, Malton, North Yorkshire
- The Royal Oak, York, England
- The Royal Oak Hotel, Great Ayton, North Yorkshire
- The Royal Oak Hotel, Lancashire

=== Other businesses ===
- Royal Oak Inn, Rouse Hill, a hotel complex in New South Wales, Australia
- Royal Oak Mall, a shopping mall in Auckland, New Zealand
- Royal Oak Mines, a gold mining company
- Royal Oak Music Theatre, Royal Oak, Michigan, U.S.
- Royal Oaks Country Club, Houston, Texas, U.S.
- Royal Oaks Golf Club, Moncton, New Brunswick, Canada
- Royal Oak Foundation, an American charitable body

=== Schools ===
- Royal Oak Intermediate, Auckland, New Zealand
- Royal Oak Neighborhood Schools and Royal Oak Middle School, Michigan, U.S.
  - Royal Oak High School
- Royal Oak Middle School (on the site of the former Royal Oak High School), Covina, California, U.S.
- Dondero High School, formerly Royal Oak High School, Royal Oak, Michigan, U.S.

== Settlements ==
=== United Kingdom ===
- Royal Oak, County Durham
- Royal Oak, Lancashire
- Royal Oak, North Yorkshire

=== United States ===
- Royal Oaks Park, Monterey County, California
- Royal Oaks, Indiana
- Royal Oak, Maryland
- Royal Oak, Michigan
- Royal Oak Charter Township, Michigan
- Royal Oak, Missouri
- Royal Oaks, Kansas City, a neighborhood of Kansas City, Missouri

=== Elsewhere ===
- Royal Oak, Calgary, Alberta, Canada
- Royal Oak, Saanich, British Columbia, Canada
- Royal Oak, County Carlow, Ireland
- Royal Oak, New Zealand

== Transportation ==
- Royal Oak station (SkyTrain), Burnaby, British Columbia, Canada
- Royal Oak tube station, a London Underground station
- Royal Oak station (Michigan), Royal Oak, Michigan, U.S.
- Royal Oaks station, a light rail station in Sacramento, California

== Warships ==
- HMS Royal Oak, the name of several warships of the British Royal Navy
- Royal Oak-class ship of the line, a class of six 74-gun third rates in the British Royal Navy

== Other uses ==
- Royal Oak, a watch by Audemars Piguet
- Prix Royal-Oak, a flat horse race in France

== See also ==
- Oak Apple Day, or Royal Oak Day
