= Bort (disambiguation) =

Bort is an industrial-grade shard of diamonds.

Bort may also refer to:

- Bort (Habkern), a settlement in the municipality of Habkern, Bern, Switzerland
- Bort (name), including a few people with the surname
- Bort number, a Russian military aircraft marking system
- Bort, two one-time characters from The Simpsons episode "Itchy & Scratchy Land"
- Bort, an Orbot from Mighty Orbots
- AS Bort, a team in the 1930–31 French Rugby Union Championship
- Bort is a cultivar of Karuka
- Bort, a character from Land of the Lustrous

== See also ==
- Bort-les-Orgues, a town in France
