= Bort (name) =

Bort is an eastern Ashkenazi Jewish nickname for a man with a beard. It originates from the Yiddish word bord and the German Bart, which both mean 'beard'. It may also be connected to the Polish word borta, a loanword from the German borte meaning 'braid' or 'galloon'.

In Catalan language, it is a variant of Bord, which means bastard, and it is used as a surname.

== People ==
Notable people with the name include:

- Eberhard Bort (1954–2017), writer, academic and traditional music activist
- Eduardo Bort (1948–2020), Spanish musician
- Joan Barreda Bort (born 1983), Spanish motorcycle racer
- Léon Teisserenc de Bort (1855–1913), French scientist
- Pierre Edmond Teisserenc de Bort (1814–1892), French writer and politician
- Vitaliy Bort, Ukrainian politician

== In popular culture ==
The name appears in a 1994 The Simpsons episode "Itchy & Scratchy Land", which includes a scene where Bart Simpson seeks his name among novelty license plates in a gift shop, but is only able to find "Bert" and "Bort". He mocks "Bort" as being an unlikely name, but other patrons identify themselves by it, and later in the episode those plates have sold out. Fans have referenced the name as an in-joke, and "BORT" vanity plates have been issued to fans in many U.S. states.

== See also ==
- Barbara Borts, American-born rabbi
- George Herbert Borts, American economist
