= Thomas Toft =

- Died: November 1689
- Resting place: Stoke-upon-Trent, Staffordshire, England
- Occupation: Potter
- Known for: Slipware
- Spouse: Ellena Bucknall (1663-1689)
- Children: Matthias, John, Thomas, James, Cornelius
- Parent(s): Ralph Toft & Margery Turner
- Relatives: Ralph Toft (brother)

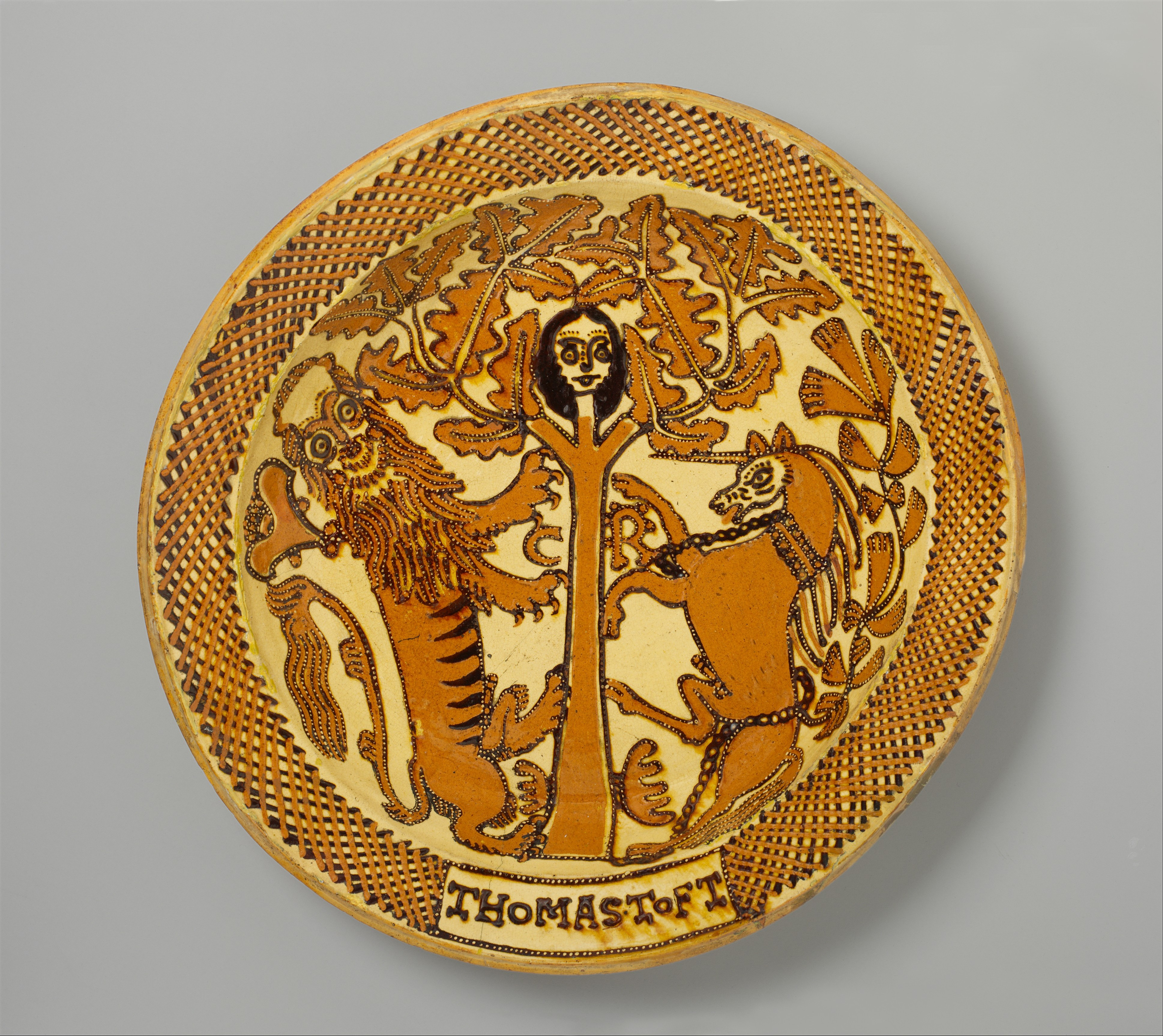
Signed charger, c. 1680, with slip-trailed decoration of Charles II in the Boscobel Oak.

Thomas Toft (died November 1698) was an English potter working in the Staffordshire Potteries during the 17th century. He and his family are known for large earthenware plates heavily decorated by slip-trailing, often in several colours. Work in this style, even by other makers, is known as Toft ware.

== Pottery ==
It is thought that Toft, who may have been of Scandinavian origin, operated in the Burslem district during at least 1671–1689. The Staffordshire potters were at that time known for the excellence of their slipware; a kind of coarse earthenware decorated with a coloured clay and water mixture of cream-like consistency called slip. Sometimes a red slip was trailed on to a lighter background, sometimes vice versa. Black and green slips were also used. According to the common practice of the time, these earthenwares were glazed with a galena lead oxide glaze, giving them their characteristic yellow tinge.

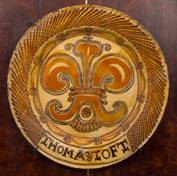
A dish with the Thomas Toft signature.

Designs attributed to Thomas Toft include mermaids, unicorns, pelicans, but also King Charles II and his wife Queen Catherine of Braganza, and numerous coats of arms. A cross-hatched rim was fairly typical of the style. The Toft style, combined with the slip trailing technique, was firmly established in the Staffordshire area by the middle of the seventeenth century. Over thirty signed dishes have been recorded but a few of them may have been made by his son, also called Thomas Toft.

== Life and family ==
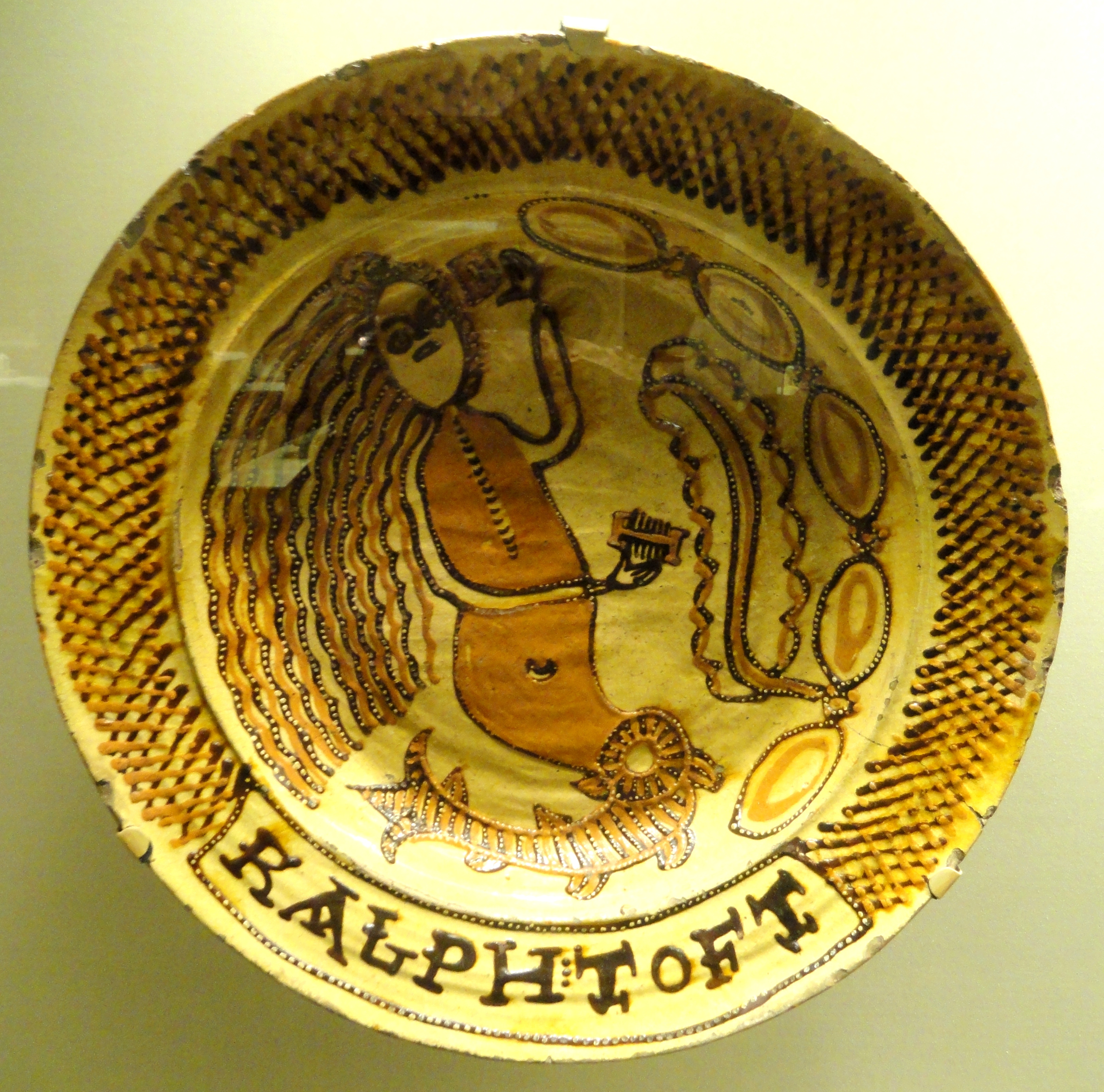
Mermaid charger by Ralph Toft

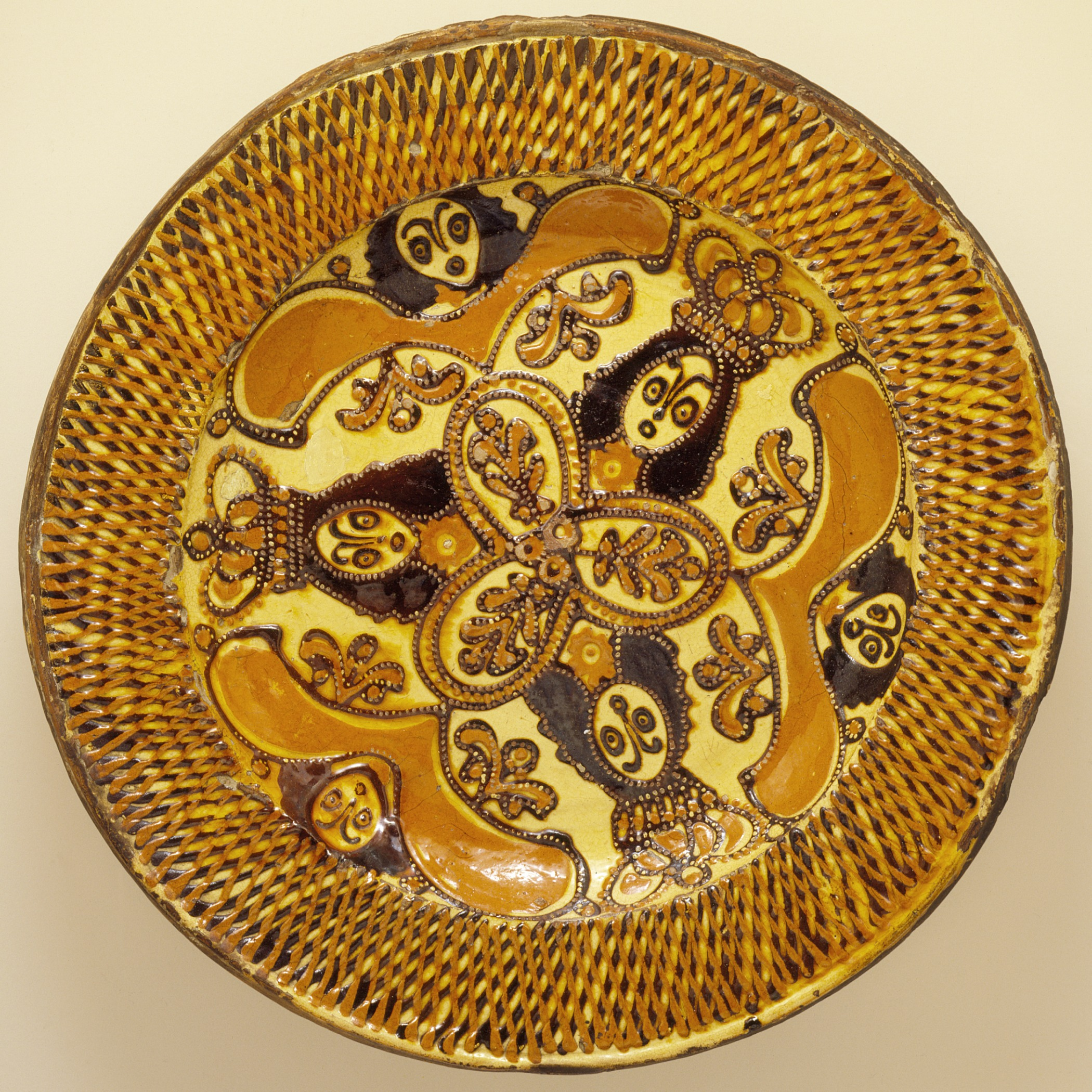
Charger in the Toft style, with slip-trailed decoration of Charles II in the Boscobel Oak, c. 1685

Very little is known about Toft's life. His father died in 1669. He married Ellena Bucknall on 21 April 1663. Toft died a pauper in 1689 and was buried at Stoke-upon-Trent, now one of the six towns making up the city of Stoke-on-Trent, on 3 December 1689. His wife Ellena died two years later in 1691. They had five children: Matthias (b.1663), John (b.1664), Thomas (1670–1723), James (b.1673) and Cornelius (1677–1728).

Toft became the grandfather to seven children although he did not live long enough to witness any of their births. Two, Maria (1701–1703) and Matthew (b.1698) were the children of James. Whilst Charles (b.1706), Cornelius (b.1703), Edward (1698–1701) and Standley (b.1700) were all the children of Matthias and his wife Dorothy Dickinson (d.1713). Much later, Charles Toft, Sr. (1831-1909) was a leading designer for Mintons, and his son Albert Toft (1862–1949) was a sculptor, whose career was dominated by public commemorative commissions in bronze, especially of Queen Victoria.

== Surviving work ==
Examples of his work can be found in:

Ireland

- National Museum of Ireland, Dublin.

United Kingdom

- Victoria and Albert Museum, London.
- Potteries Museum & Art Gallery, Stoke-on-Trent.
- Temple Newsam, Leeds.
- Manchester Art Gallery, Manchester.
- Fitzwilliam Museum, Cambridge.
- British Museum, London.
- Grosvenor Museum, Chester.
- Yorkshire Museum, York.
- Ashmolean Museum, Oxford.

United States

- Los Angeles County Museum of Art.
- Nelson-Atkins Museum of Art, Kansas City.
- The Philadelphia Museum of Art.
- The Metropolitan Museum of Art, New York.

Three tiny fragments of Toft pottery including a shard inscribed '...OFT' were found three feet below ground at the corner of Stafford Street and Trinity Street, Hanley in 1953.

== Other Toft potters ==
=== Ralph Toft ===
Ralph Toft (b.1683) was probably Thomas' elder brother, he shared the name of their father. Ralph's name appears on many typical Toft-style dishes decorated with a double-headed eagle, cavaliers and ladies, or with a mermaid, two being dated 1676 and 1766.

Ralph married Christabell Hatton (d.1693), the couple had no known children.

=== James Toft ===
James Toft (b.1673) was Thomas' fourth son, it is believed that he is the maker of a number of Toft dishes that bear his name.

=== Cornelius Toft ===
Cornelius Toft (1677–1728) was the youngest son of Thomas. A two-handled incised white salt-glazed loving cup is inscribed as follows:

W B Marthar Barber C T

Cornelius Toft 1727/8 hand

C Martha Barber T

1727/8
