= Listed buildings in Frindsbury Extra =

Historic structures in Kent, England

Frindsbury Extra is a village and civil parish in the unitary authority of Medway in Kent, England. It contains three grade I, one grade II* and 24 grade II listed buildings that are recorded in the National Heritage List for England.

This list is for Frindsbury Extra and the Upnors.

For the unparished area of Frindsbury within Medway see Listed buildings in Medway, non civil parish (Frindsbury, Rochester, Strood).

This list is based on the information retrieved online from Historic England.

== Key ==
Grade	Criteria
I	Buildings that are of exceptional interest
II*	Particularly important buildings of more than special interest
II	Buildings that are of special interest

== Listing ==
Name	Grade	Location	Type	Completed (Note: The date given is the date used by Historic England as significant for the initial building or that of an important part in the structure's description.)	Date designated	Grid ref. (Note: The grid reference is based on the British national grid reference system, sometimes known as OSGB36, used by the Ordnance Survey.) Geo-coordinates	Notes	Entry number (Note: The "List Entry Number" is a unique number assigned to each listed building and scheduled monument by Historic England.)	Image	Wikidata
Royal Oak public house	II	53, Cooling Road			24 May 2016	TQ7398570466; 51°24′24″N 0°30′00″E	Late 17C timber-framed house. From mid 18C used as a pub. Extended 18C, 19C and 20C. Refaced in brick c.1800.	1434926	Royal Oak public house More images	Q24331737
Tudor Cottage	II	130, Cooling Road			14 November 1986	TQ7389870672; 51°24′30″N 0°29′56″E	Late 16C timber-framed house.	1085738	Tudor Cottage	Q26374088
Stone House Farmhouse	II	Dillywood Lane			14 November 1986	TQ7316471292; 51°24′51″N 0°29′19″E	}18C house. Possibly earlier, possibly timber framed.	1336488	Stone House Farmhouse	Q26620977
Cypress House	II	227, Frindsbury Hill			14 November 1986	TQ7440670314; 51°24′18″N 0°30′22″E	17C house, refaced in banded blue and red brick.	1085739	Upload Photo	Q26374093
Vine Cottage	II	229, Frindsbury Hill			14 November 1986	TQ7443070336; 51°24′19″N 0°30′23″E	Late 18C brick cottage. catslide roof to right.	1336489	Upload Photo	Q26620978
3, High Street	II	3, High Street			14 November 1986	TQ7571870517; 51°24′23″N 0°31′30″E		1085740	Upload Photo	Q26374098
12-18, High Street	II	12-18, High Street			14 November 1986	TQ7574370490; 51°24′22″N 0°31′31″E		1336491	Upload Photo	Q26620980
Castle House and Albermarle Cottage	II	19 and 21, High Street			14 November 1986	TQ7576370502; 51°24′23″N 0°31′32″E		1336490	Upload Photo	Q26620979
Waterhouse Cottage	II	25-27, High Street			14 November 1986	TQ7577770501; 51°24′23″N 0°31′33″E		1085741	Upload Photo	Q26374104
The Tudor Rose Public House	II	29, High Street			15 September 2003	TQ7579070497; 51°24′23″N 0°31′34″E		1390628	Upload Photo	Q26670015
30-32, High Street	II	30-32, High Street			14 November 1986	TQ7577370488; 51°24′22″N 0°31′33″E		1085743	Upload Photo	Q26374109
Waterside Cottage	II	36, High Street			14 November 1986	TQ7578170473; 51°24′22″N 0°31′33″E		1204303	Upload Photo	Q26499764
Walsall House	II	40, High Street			14 November 1986	TQ7578370481; 51°24′22″N 0°31′33″E		1336492	Upload Photo	Q26620981
The Barracks	I	High Street			14 November 1986	TQ7581070502; 51°24′23″N 0°31′35″E		1085742	Upload Photo	Q17533079
Sole Street Farm House	II	Lower Rochester Road			14 November 1986	TQ7365271102; 51°24′44″N 0°29′44″E	Early 16C timber framed farmhouse, later extended. Weatherboarded.	1281289	Upload Photo	Q26570350
Brickhouse Farmhouse	II	Stonehorse Lane			29 April 1977	TQ7328771062; 51°24′44″N 0°29′25″E	1677 timber framed farmhouse. Date on tablet with "I ♥ L".	1204311	Brickhouse Farmhouse	Q26499771
Boundary Stone (Old London Stone)	II	Upnor			14 November 1986	TQ7619971231; 51°24′46″N 0°31′56″E		1085744	Upload Photo	Q26374112
Traverse to former Shifting House, Lower Upnor Ordnance Depot	II	Upnor			7 September 2011	TQ7587270639; 51°24′27″N 0°31′38″E		1402942	Upload Photo	Q26675563
WWI Sentry Post at the Lower Upnor Ordnance Depot	II	Upnor			7 September 2011	TQ7585070680; 51°24′28″N 0°31′37″E		1402948	Upload Photo	Q26675564
Obelisk (New London Stone)	II	Upnor			6 May 2015	TQ7619971228; 51°24′46″N 0°31′56″E		1425102	Upload Photo	Q26677162
Ship's Figurehead from the Arethusa	II	14, Upnor Road,, Grounds of the Arethusa Venture Centre			25 January 2019	TQ7623271244; 51°24′46″N 0°31′58″E		1460787	Upload Photo	Q61045534
The Manor House	II	Upnor Road			27 August 1952	TQ7475570055; 51°24′09″N 0°30′40″E	Late 16C farmhouse. Refronted mid 18C.	1085745	Upload Photo	Q26374118
Barn 30 Yards South West of the Manor House	I	Upnor Road			27 August 1952	TQ7469470041; 51°24′09″N 0°30′36″E	Timber framed barn of 1300 or c.1400 originally of 14 bays. Four bays lost to fire in 2003.	1204320	Barn 30 Yards South West of the Manor House	Q17533323
Manor Farm Oast	II	Upnor Road			6 June 1995	TQ7479370058; 51°24′09″N 0°30′42″E	1860s oasthouse. Two circular kilns. 5 bay stowage, described in the listing as having "unusually attractive architectural treatment".	1278058	Upload Photo	Q26567424
Building LU001 (Former B Magazine) , Upnor Depot	II*	Upnor Road			17 April 2009	TQ7589470774; 51°24′31″N 0°31′40″E		1393292	Upload Photo	Q17551813
Wall Extending NE From Upnor Castle Along the River Medway	II	Upnor Road			17 April 2009	TQ7592670781; 51°24′32″N 0°31′41″E		1393293	Upload Photo	Q26672467
Upnor Castle	I	Upper Upnor			14 November 1986	TQ7585670574; 51°24′25″N 0°31′37″E		1204365	Upnor Castle More images	Q7898392
Upnor Castle House	II	Upper Upnor			14 November 1986	TQ7573070572; 51°24′25″N 0°31′31″E		1336493	Upload Photo	Q26620982

== See also ==
- Grade I listed buildings in Kent
- Grade II* listed buildings in Kent

== Sources ==
- Austin, Rupert (May 2005), Manor Farm barn, Frindsbury, Kent; An architectural description, Canterbury Archaeological Trust, FIN/BR2/03, record no 1744
- Rigold, S.E. (1966), "Some major Kentish timber barns", Archaeologia Cantiana, LXXXI, Kent Archaeological Society: 1–38
- Newman, John (2012) [1969], Kent: West and the Weald, The Buildings of England, New Haven and London: Yale University Press, ISBN 978-0-300-18509-6
