= Eberhard Bort =

Writer, academic and traditional music activist

Eberhard "Paddy" Bort (1 December 1954 – 17 February 2017) was a writer, academic and traditional music activist. He was associate director of the University of Edinburgh’s International Social Sciences Institute and academic co-ordinator of its Institute of Governance, and was a leading proponent of traditional music in the Scottish capital city, Edinburgh.

== Background ==
Originally from Baden-Württemberg in Germany, Bort moved to Ireland during the 1970s, where he taught German Studies at Trinity College Dublin. It is during his time in Ireland that he became involved in theatre and the Irish traditional music scene. He settled in Scotland in 1995.

Bort authored numerous books on Politics, and edited four books on the Scottish folk revival, with a particular focus on one of its major proponents Hamish Henderson.

He was a founder member of the Wee Folk Club at The Royal Oak in Edinburgh, and had served as chairman of Edinburgh Folk Club for sixteen years at the time of his death in 2017. In 2002, Bort established the annual Carrying Stream Festival, a celebration of the life and legacy of folklorist Hamish Henderson. Bort’s promotion of Scottish folk music also extended to his home country of Germany, organising as he did, events such as the Inselfolk Festival in Lauffen am Neckar.

His final book, co-written with Scottish broadcaster and journalist Lesley Riddoch ‘McSmörgåsbord’ — concerning lessons from Nordic countries for a post-Brexit Scotland — was completed just before his death.
