= Royal Oak, Frindsbury =

Public house in Kent, England

Royal Oak public house
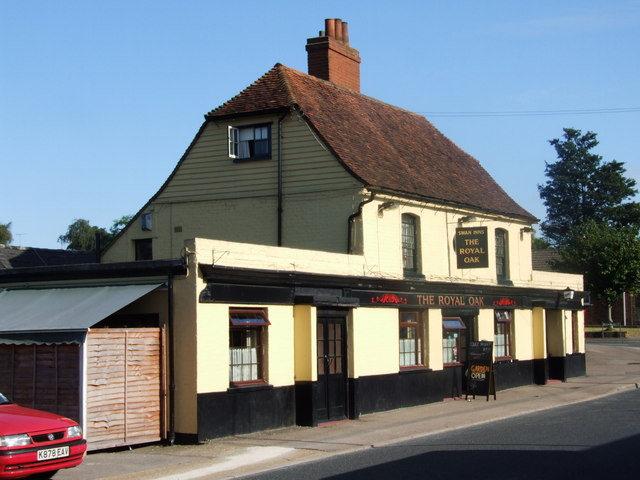
- The Royal Oak in 2009 taken from the northwest showing the top of the catslide at rear

- Royal Oak shown within Kent
- 51°24′24″N 0°30′00″E
- Location: Frindsbury, Kent, England
- OS grid reference: TQ7398570466

Listed Building
- Official name: Royal Oak public house
- Type: Grade II
- Designated: 24 May 2016
- Reference no.: 1434926

The Royal Oak is a Grade II-listed house (formerly a public house, or "pub") in Frindsbury, a Medway town in Kent, United Kingdom. The building dates from the late 17th century and it was used as a public house since before 1754. It is one of a few pre-Victorian buildings on Cooling Road in Frindsbury and one of the last remaining coach houses in the area.

The two-storey timber-framed building was remodelled throughout the 18th and 19th centuries, with extensions in the 19th and 20th centuries, while the pre-1840 parts of the building remain intact to the present day.

The pub was sold by Enterprise Inns to a property developer in 2015 who closed the pub and proposed demolition. The "Save The Royal Oak, Frindsbury" campaign opposed its demolition, and the pub was subsequently registered as an asset of community value by Medway Council and as a Grade II listed building by Historic England in 2016. In early 2017, the campaign was seeking funding to try and to buy the pub to reopen it for the community; the developer was subsequently granted planning permission in June 2017 to convert the building into residential use. It was subsequently converted to a house, with additional housing built next door.

== Location ==
The Royal Oak is located in Frindsbury, a Medway town in Kent, United Kingdom; the address is Royal Oak, 53 Cooling Road, Frindsbury, Strood, Kent, ME2 4RP. It is north of Frindsbury's town centre and is around 0.7 miles (1.1 km) from Strood railway station, 0.1 miles (0.16 km) from Hilltop Primary School and 0.3 miles (0.48 km) from Strood Academy. It lies on chalk geology (Lewes, Newhaven, and Seaford chalk formations).

The site of the pub covers 0.093 hectares (930 m^{2}) to the east of Cooling Road, at the junction with Iden Road. It is one of four pre-Victorian buildings on the road following from a 20th-century clearance and it is one of the last remaining coach houses in the area. It was originally in the Bill Street hamlet, which merged into Frindsbury in the 1940s, when Frindsbury was a rural village separate from Strood. It is located in a region of post-World War I two-storey housing in a variety of building styles. The pub formerly faced the village's old vicarage (for the All Saints Church, Frindsbury) until the vicarage was demolished in the 1930s; it is now opposite a former petrol station turned MOT test centre. The nearest other listed building is the Grade II Tudor Cottage around 210m to the north, although neither are located in a conservation area. Around 20 other pubs were located within one mile from the Royal Oak, including five within half a mile (the Ship Inn, Sans Pareil, The Bell, The Bas Bar, and the Weston Arms).

== History ==
=== Founding ===
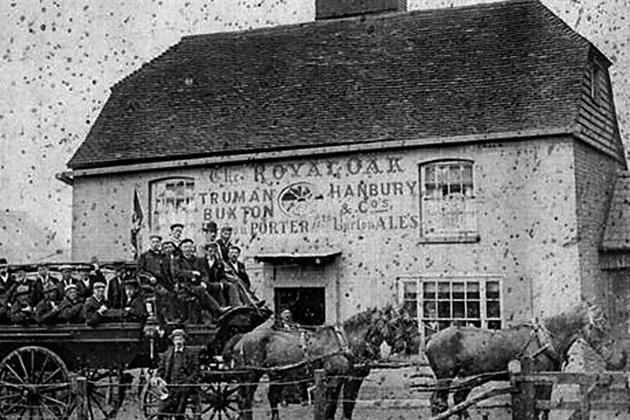
The Royal Oak in the era of horse-drawn transport, circa 1900

The date that the building was first constructed is uncertain, with best estimates putting the build date during the Georgian era around the late 17th century as a timber-framed house; this is determined by the chamfered beams and the rectangular lobby entrance with the front door centrally located, opening to back-to-back fireplaces with main rooms to the left and right, known as a 'baffle-entry' layout. It transitioned into use as a public house by 1754, which is a common origin of country pubs. It was mentioned in the Melville's Directory of 1858, with Joseph Charlton as the licensee. In 1895 William Sayer, a former landlord of the pub, was killed in a collapse at a nearby chalk mine. It appears on historical maps from 1867, 1897 and various others since, and was labelled as the Royal Oak Public House on all but the first. A number of brickworks were located adjacent to the pub in the 19th and 20th centuries.

The origin of the name of the pub is unclear, but one reported theory is that it was named after the 17th-century warship HMS Royal Oak, which was sunk at the nearby Raid on the Medway in 1664. Local people say that one of the beams in the pub comes from the ship, the remains of which may have been broken up at a nearby shipyard after the battle. Another theory is that it was named after the Royal Oak that Charles II of England hid in following the Battle of Worcester.

=== Remodelling ===
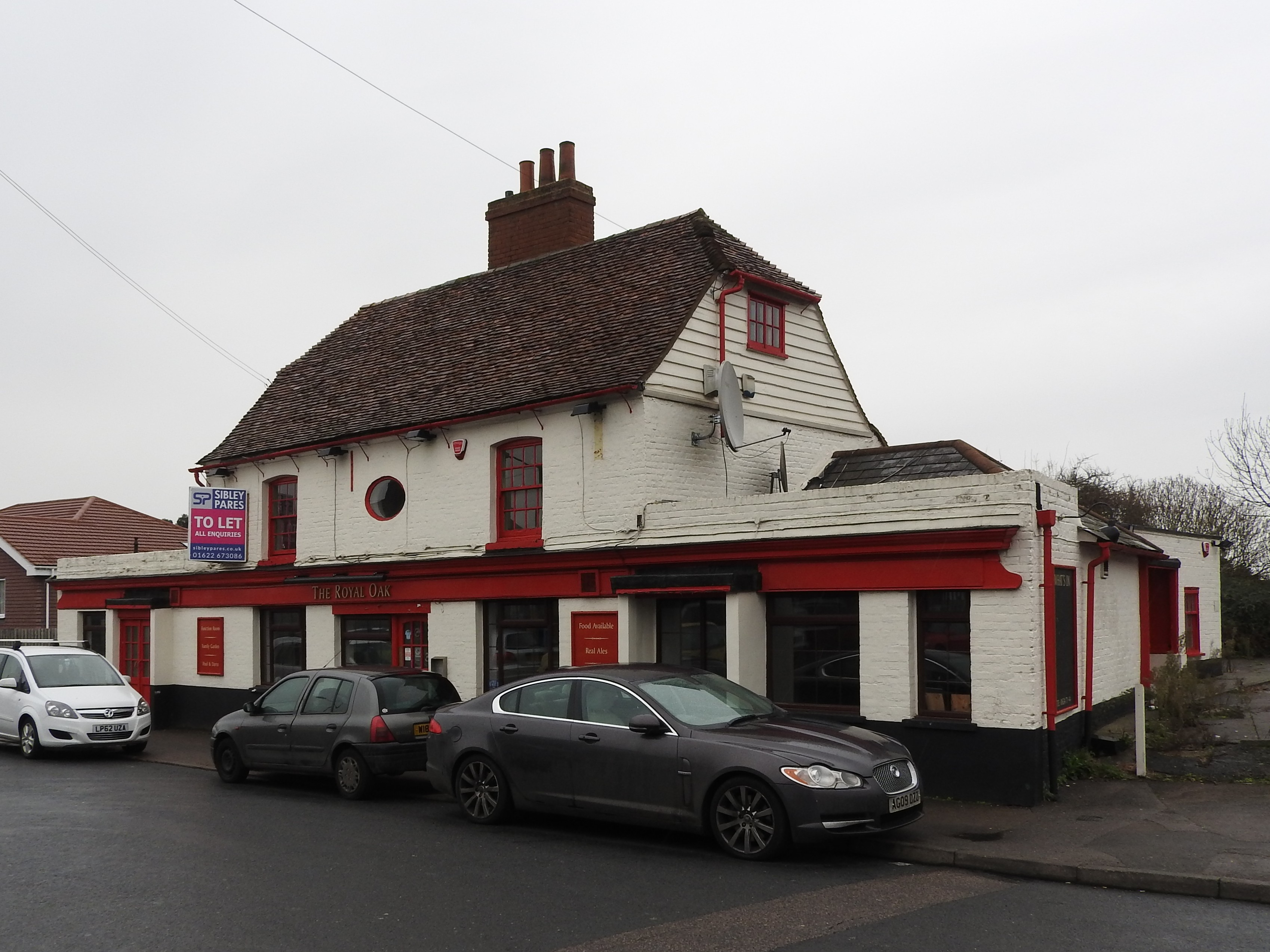
View from the southwest showing the oculus window (by pub sign), half-hipped roof and attic casement

In the late 18th or early 19th century it was given a Flemish Bond brick face and the rear was extended with a catslide roof. A slate-roofed, single-level extension was added to the south prior to 1867. The front ground floor was remodelled sometime between 1900 and 1930, with a doorcase removed and a fascia and cornice added. Later in the 20th century, single-storey extensions were added to the north in the 1960s, and also to the rear (both with flat roofs) and the south, including a uPVC conservatory. The front of the building was also modelled, with a wider front door, fascia sign and plinth added across both the original frontage and the extensions, dividing the architectural features of the ground and first floors. A large amount of the pre-1840 fabric of the building, including first floor joinery, survives into the 21st century.

=== Redevelopment and listing ===
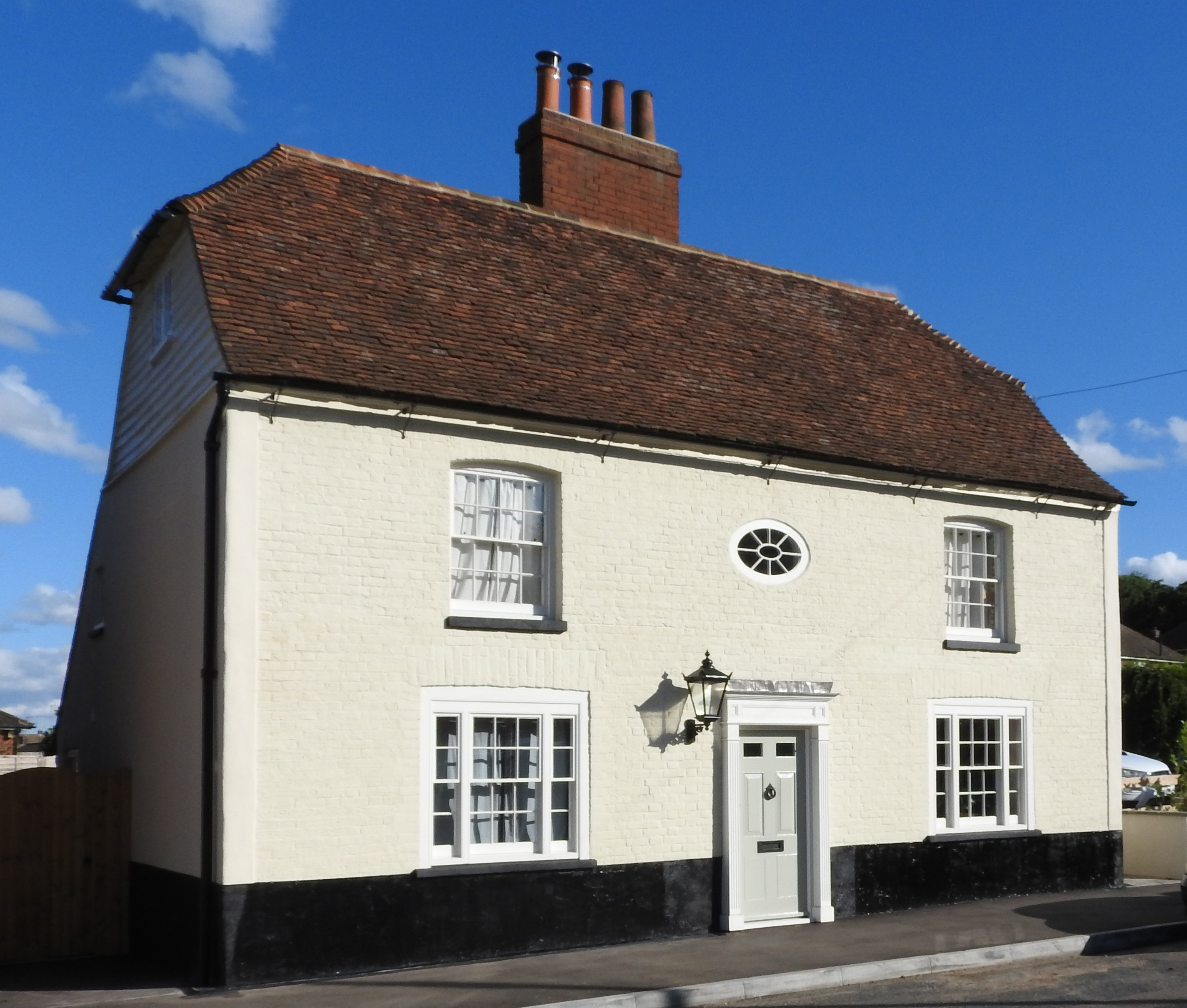
The Royal Oak after redevelopment in 2021

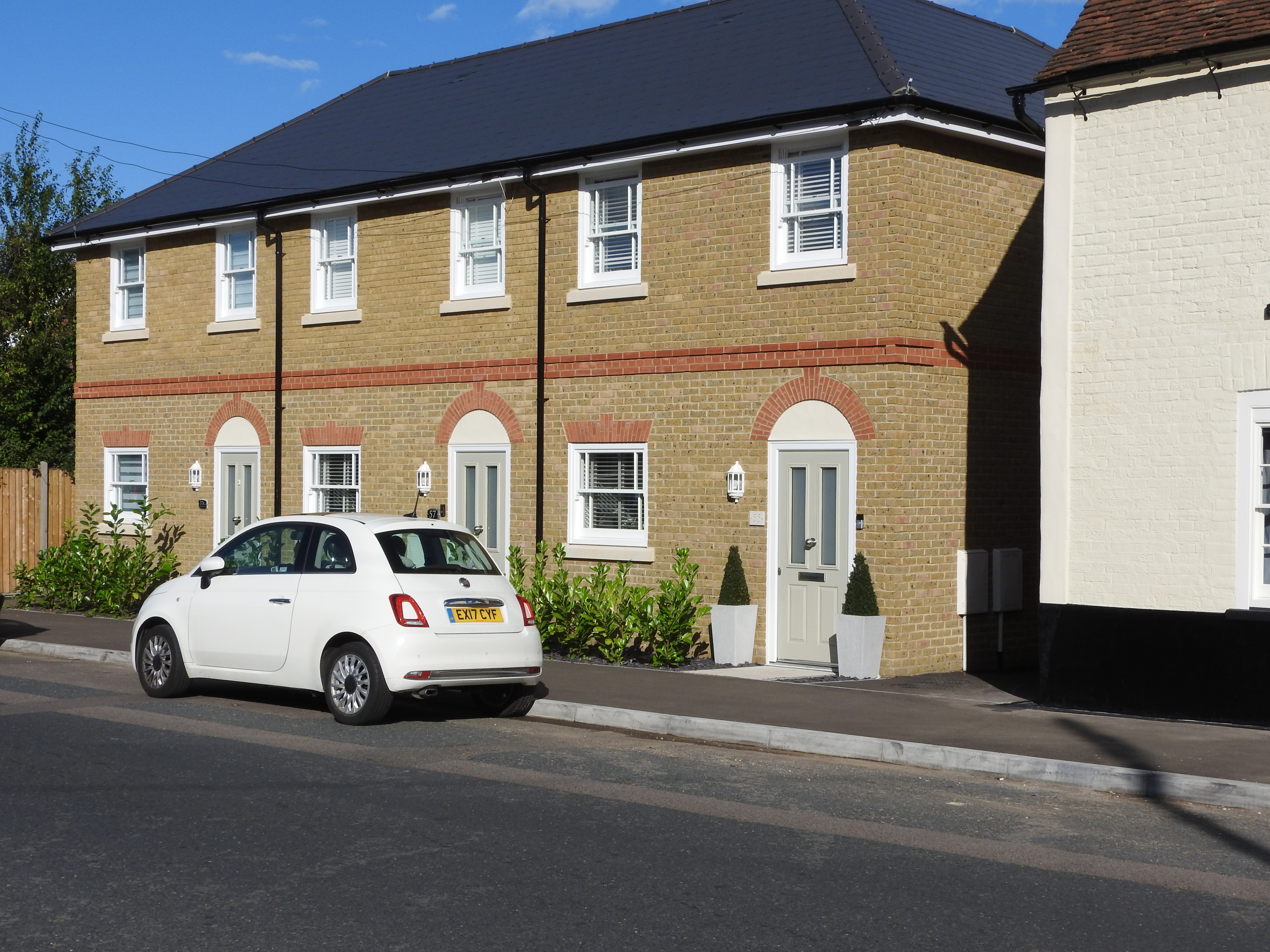
The houses built on the pub garden

By the 2010s the building was owned by Enterprise Inns, who own around 5,500 pubs in the UK. Despite advertising for a new lease of the building in circa 2013 whilst letting the property for a peppercorn rent, Enterprise Inns ultimately decided to sell the property as a freehold in March 2015. No offers to continue operating the building as a pub were received, although some offers were received from developers seeking to redevelop the property, perhaps due to the substantial refurbishment of the building that was required.

The building was subsequently sold by Enterprise Inns to property developer Interesting Developments in September 2015 for £275,000 plus VAT, rather than being sold to the former landlord for the same price. It then closed as a pub in 2015, with initial plans to demolish the pub and construct seven houses on the site submitted in December 2015 and after revision the construction of six homes was formally proposed in 2016. Although initial indications from Medway Council were for the development, the "Save The Royal Oak, Frindsbury" campaign started, led by Joe O'Donnell, who organised a petition against the demolition that was signed by over 1,000 people. The pub featured in a BBC magazine article on the future of UK pubs in 2016, given their declining numbers in the 21st century and historical value.

In 2016 the pub was listed as an asset of community value by Medway Council. The building was then Grade II listed by Historic England on 24 May 2016 due to its architectural interest and the intactness of the pre-1840 parts of the building, excluding the later extensions (aside from the first extension to the rear) and modern bar fittings. Plans to demolish the building were withdrawn in May 2016. The "Save The Royal Oak, Frindsbury" campaign started seeking funding to buy the pub to re-open it for the community, alongside a loan from the UK Government's "Pub Loan Fund" and an application for funding to the Plunkett Foundation, in a six-month period from November 2016. The asking price was £450,000 plus VAT (excluding the garden), significantly more than the developer purchased the site for and was seen as unreasonable, despite several expressions of interest.

Following from draft plans in August 2016, a new planning application was submitted by Interesting Developments on 16 January 2017 to convert the pub back into a house as it appeared around 1900, demolishing the 20th century extensions and modifications and restoring historic features such as the interior fireplaces and the oculus window, A separate part to the planning application included three two-storey two-bedroom terraced houses to be constructed on the pub garden, along with a redesigned and landscaped car park to include a charging station. An additional house to the rear of the pub was considered but not proposed; campaigners criticised the absence of plans to preserve some historic features, the partial demolition of the building and the proximity of the new buildings. Despite objections, planning permission was granted by Medway Council on 13 June 2017.

As of 2021 it was for sale after conversion to a four-bedroom house, with two bathrooms, three parking spaces and an electric car charging point, with an asking price of £580,000.

== Architecture ==
=== Exterior ===
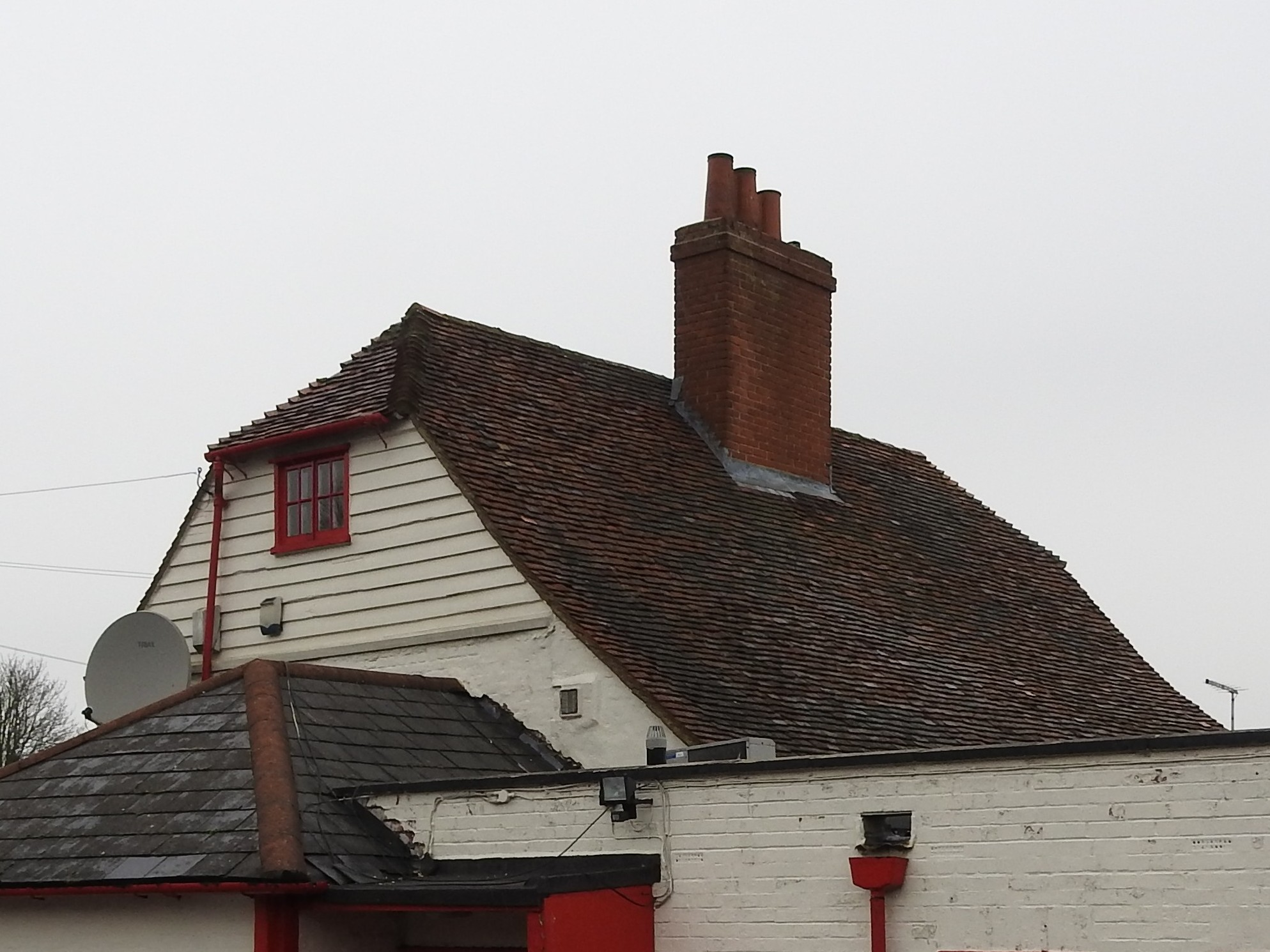
The rear, showing the catslide roof and modern flat-roofed extensions

The main part of the detached building is two storeys high along with an attic and cellar. The building was based on a timber frame structure that partially survives although refaced in brick and affected by later extensions. It is mostly rendered and painted white or cream, with doors and window frames painted red or brown.

The west-facing front of the original building consists of three bays with a central door. Above the door is an oculus window that originally had glazing bars, with other windows on both sides that have segmented arched heads and timber sills. The original upper floor windows have been replaced in the 19th or 20th century while the ground floor windows are modern but within the original openings.

The sides of the original building are hidden by the modern extensions up to the level of the first floor. The gables are weatherboarded above the plain wall with double casement windows opening into the attic. The rear has a prominent late 18th century extension covered by the catslide roof. The rest of the rear of the building is a series of flat-roofed extensions. The roof is steeply pitched, tiled and half-hipped with over-hanging eaves Kent peg tiles, and weatherboarded gables. Forged brackets support the guttering.

The pub also has a lawned pub garden to the north and a car park to the south. The car park has a covenant that prevents it from being built upon, with underground channels, cables and pipes, and an adjacent substation. A well is also located in the rear yard of the pub, one of a number in the immediate area.

=== Interior ===
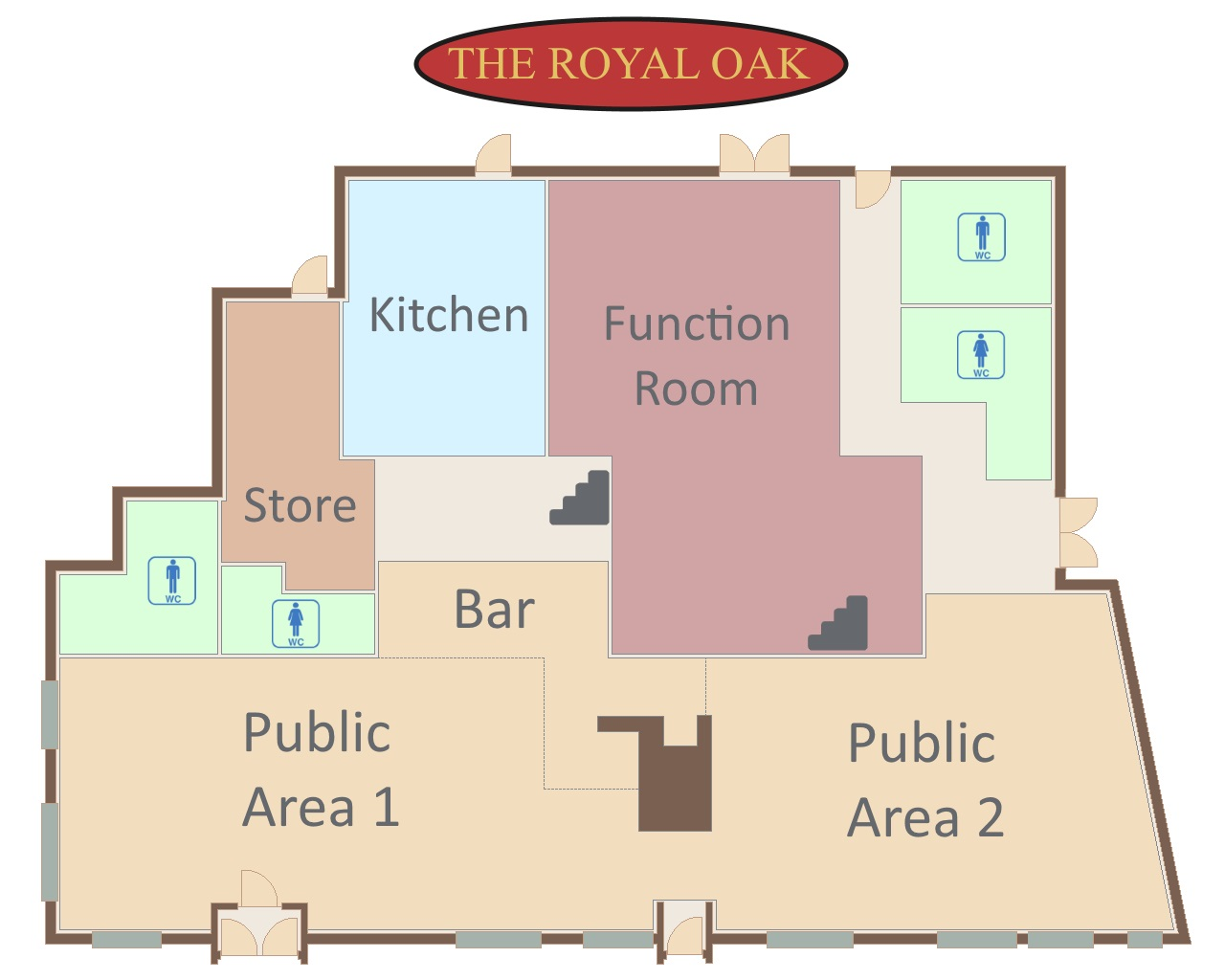
The interior layout of the ground floor of the Royal Oak

The ground floor pair of bars (one either side of the door) have been knocked through into the extensions to the rear to create an open-plan layout for the bar, which is a common feature of pubs. The ground floor also has a function room and kitchen. Studding at the back of the bar may be the original rear wall. Some of the principal timbers survive, such as some original chamfered beams that are visible except in the northern room, however most of the joinery has been replaced over the years. The area used for the pub had an internal floorspace of 218.5 square metres (2,352 sq ft).

The central chimney stack exists, but the back-to-back fireplaces have been blocked. The staircase may have originally been located to one side of the back-to-back fireplaces, but no evidence of this remains. There are two rooms on the upstairs floor, the southern one having been partitioned, plus an additional two rooms in the attic complete with modern fittings. The first floor and attic was used as a flat, with a kitchen, living room and office on the first floor, and two bedrooms in the attic. The roof is thought to be from around 1800 but has subsequently been strengthened.

== See also ==
- Listed buildings in Frindsbury
