= George Herbert Borts =

American economist

George Herbert Borts (August 29, 1927 – May 2, 2014) was an American economist.

Born in New York City on August 29, 1927, to parents Elias Alexander Borts and his wife Etta Borts, née Silberg, George Herbert Borts earned his bachelor's degree in economics and history from Columbia University. Borts continued graduate study in economics under Milton Friedman at the University of Chicago, earning his master's degree in 1949, and his doctorate in 1953. Borts began teaching at Brown University in 1950, and later became the George S. and Nancy B. Parker Professor of Economics. He was managing editor of The American Economic Review from 1969 to 1980. In 1975, Borts was awarded a Guggenheim Fellowship. He died in Providence, Rhode Island on May 2, 2014, aged 86.
