= Royal Oak =

Tree in which King Charles II hid in 1651

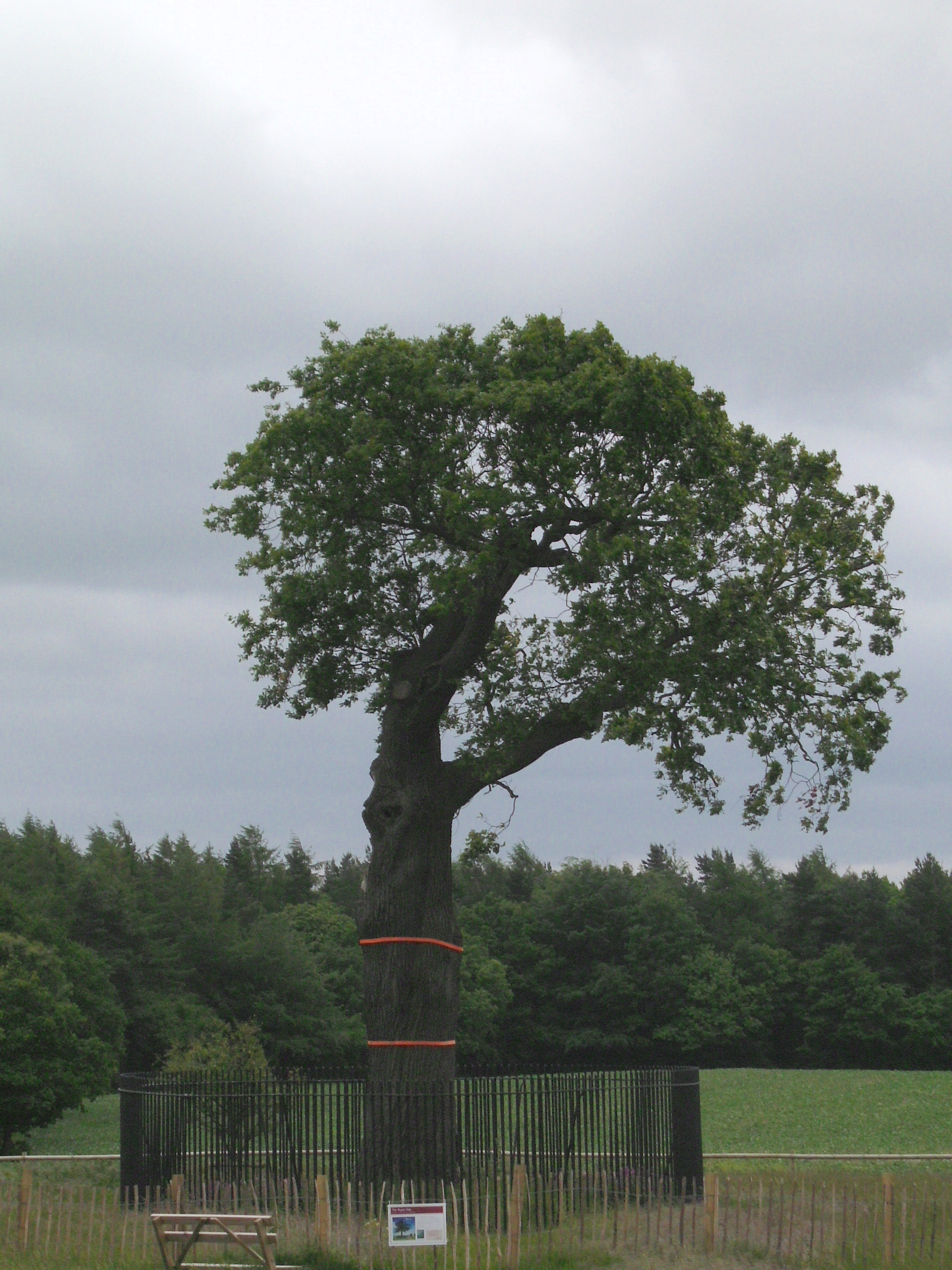
- Descendant of Royal Oak near Boscobel House, Shropshire in 2011

- Location within England
- Species: English oak (Quercus robur)
- Location: Boscobel House, Shropshire, England
- Coordinates: 52°40′12″N 2°14′31″W
- Date seeded: Original – c.1550 1st generation descendant of Royal Oak – c.1725 2nd generation descendant of Royal Oak – 1897 3rd generation descendant of Royal Oak – 1951 4th generation descendant of Royal Oak – 2001
- Date felled: Original – c.1725 destroyed as a result of souvenir hunters
- Custodian: Francis Yates Partners
- Website: English Heritage 'BOSCOBEL HOUSE AND THE ROYAL OAK'

The Royal Oak was the English oak tree within which the future King Charles II of England hid to escape the Roundheads following the Battle of Worcester in 1651. The tree was in Boscobel Wood, which was part of the park of Boscobel House. Charles told Samuel Pepys in 1680 that while he was hiding in the tree, a Parliamentarian soldier passed directly below it. The story was popular after the Restoration, and is remembered every year in the English traditions of Royal Oak Day.

== History ==
Coat of arms granted to Col Careless (or Carlis)

After the defeat of Charles' Royalist army at the hands of Oliver Cromwell's New Model Army in the Battle of Worcester, the King fled with Lord Derby, Lord Wilmot and other royalists, seeking shelter at the safe houses of White Ladies Priory and Boscobel House.

Initially, Charles was led to White Ladies Priory by Charles Giffard, a cousin of the owner, and his servant Francis Yates, the only man later executed for his part in the escape. There, the Penderel (Pendrell or Pendrill) family, tenants and servants of the Giffard family began to be important in guiding and caring for him. The King was disguised as a woodman by Charles Giffard and the Penderel family. From White Ladies, Richard Penderel led Charles in an unsuccessful attempt to cross the Severn near Madeley, Shropshire. They were forced to retrace their steps and Charles took refuge at Boscobel. On 6 September 1651, he there met with William Careless (or Carlis), a native of nearby Brewood, one of the last royalists to escape the battlefield. Careless's rank is variously reported as Captain, Major and Colonel.

Careless suggested that the house was unsafe and recommended that the king hide in an oak tree in the woodlands surrounding Boscobel House. The king and Careless took some food and drink and they spent all day hiding in a pollarded oak tree which became known as the Royal Oak. From the oak they could see patrols of Parliamentary soldiers searching for the king. Later Charles spent the night hiding in one of Boscobel's priest holes. He was then moved from Boscobel to Moseley Old Hall, another Catholic redoubt near Wolverhampton, and ultimately escaped the region posing as the servant of Jane Lane of Bentley, whose family were also landowners at Broom Hall and the Hyde in Brewood.

After the Restoration in 1660 Charles granted annuities to the Penderels for their services (still paid to their descendants to this day) and for Careless's help during the escape from Worcester and for other services he was made a Gentleman of the Privy Chamber, and Charles, by letters patent, granted Careless the new surname of Carlos (Spanish for Charles) and a new "appropriate" coat of arms. The Penderels and Colonel Careless employed coats of arms depicting an oak tree and three royal crowns, differentiated by colour.

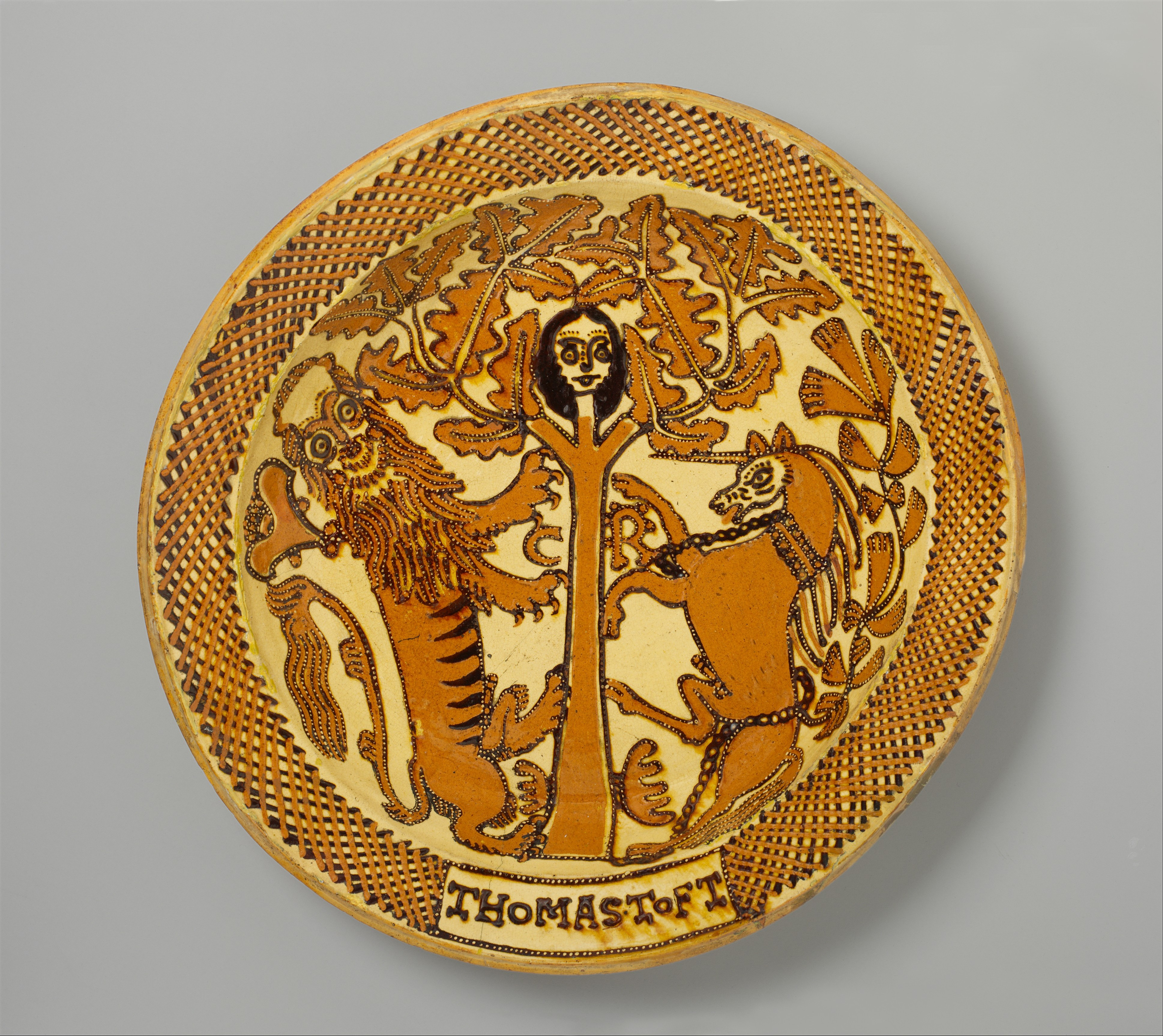
A Thomas Toft signed charger, c. 1680, with slip-trailed decoration of Charles II in the oak tree

Large slipware dishes (known as 'chargers') depicting the Boscobel Oak were made by the Staffordshire potter Thomas Toft. The oak tree is shown being supported by the Lion and Unicorn, with the king's face peeping from the branches.

== Current situation ==
The site of the tree is near Boscobel House but, unlike the house, is not owned by English Heritage. The field in which the tree stands is owned and farmed by Francis Yates Partners, who allow the public access along a path from the garden of the house.

The tree standing on the site today is not the original Royal Oak, which is recorded to have been destroyed during the seventeenth and eighteenth centuries by tourists who cut off branches and chunks as souvenirs. The present day tree is believed to be a two or three hundred year-old descendant of the original and is thus known as 'Son of Royal Oak'. In 2000, Son of Royal Oak was badly damaged during a violent storm and lost many branches. In September 2010, it was found to have developed large and dangerous cracks. Since 2011 the tree has been surrounded by an outer perimeter fence to ensure the safety of visitors.

Three third generation descendants of the Royal Oak have been ceremonially planted nearby:

1. In 1897, a tree was planted on the western edge of the garden of Boscobel House by Augustus Legge, then bishop of Lichfield, to commemorate the Diamond Jubilee of Queen Victoria.
2. A further tree was planted in 1951 near the site of the original Royal Oak by Orlando Bridgeman, 5th Earl of Bradford, who was the owner of Boscobel House at the time, to mark the tercentenary of Charles II's escape.
3. Another oak sapling grown from one of the Son's acorns was planted in 2001 by King Charles III, who was Prince of Wales at the time.

Saplings, certified as grown from the Son's acorns, are available from the English Heritage shop at Boscobel House.

In commemoration of the tree's significance in British history, a number of places and things have been named after the Royal Oak. For example, The Royal Oak is the third most common pub name in Britain. and there have been eight warships of the Royal Navy named HMS Royal Oak.

== See also ==
- Escape of Charles II
- Knights of the Royal Oak
- List of Great British Trees
- List of individual trees
- English oak
- Robur Carolinum, "Charles' Oak", a now-defunct constellation
- Oak Apple Day
