= HMS Royal Oak =

Eight ships of the Royal Navy have been named HMS Royal Oak, after the Royal Oak in which Charles II hid himself during his flight from the country in the English Civil War:

- HMS Royal Oak (1664) was a 76-gun second rate launched in 1664 and burnt by the Dutch in 1667 in the Raid on the Medway.
- HMS Royal Oak (1674) was a 70-gun third rate launched in 1674, rebuilt in 1690, 1713, and 1741. Her 1741 rebuild left her as a 64-gun fourth rate. She was a prison ship between 1756 and 1763, and was broken up in 1764.
- HMS Royal Oak (1769) was a 74-gun third rate launched in 1769 and used as a prison ship from 1796. She was renamed HMS Assistance in 1805, and was broken up in 1815.
- HMS Royal Oak was to have been a 74-gun third rate but she was renamed HMS Renown before her launch in 1798.
- HMS Royal Oak (1809) was a 74-gun third rate launched in 1809, on harbour service from 1825, and broken up in 1850.
- HMS Royal Oak (1862) was an ironclad frigate launched in 1862 and sold in 1885.
- HMS Royal Oak (1892) was a Royal Sovereign-class battleship launched in 1892 and scrapped in 1914.
- HMS Royal Oak (08) was a Revenge-class battleship launched in 1914 and sunk at anchor in 1939, in Scapa Flow.

== Battle honours ==
Ships named Royal Oak have earned the following battle honours:

- Lowestoft, 1665
- Four Days' Battle, 1666
- Orfordness, 1666
- Barfleur, 1692
- Malaga, 1704
- Passero, 1718
- Chesapeake, 1781
- The Saints, 1782
- Jutland, 1916
