= The Royal Oak, Hail Weston =

Pub in Cambridgeshire, England

Coordinates: 52.2455°N 0.2950°W

Royal Oak Pub
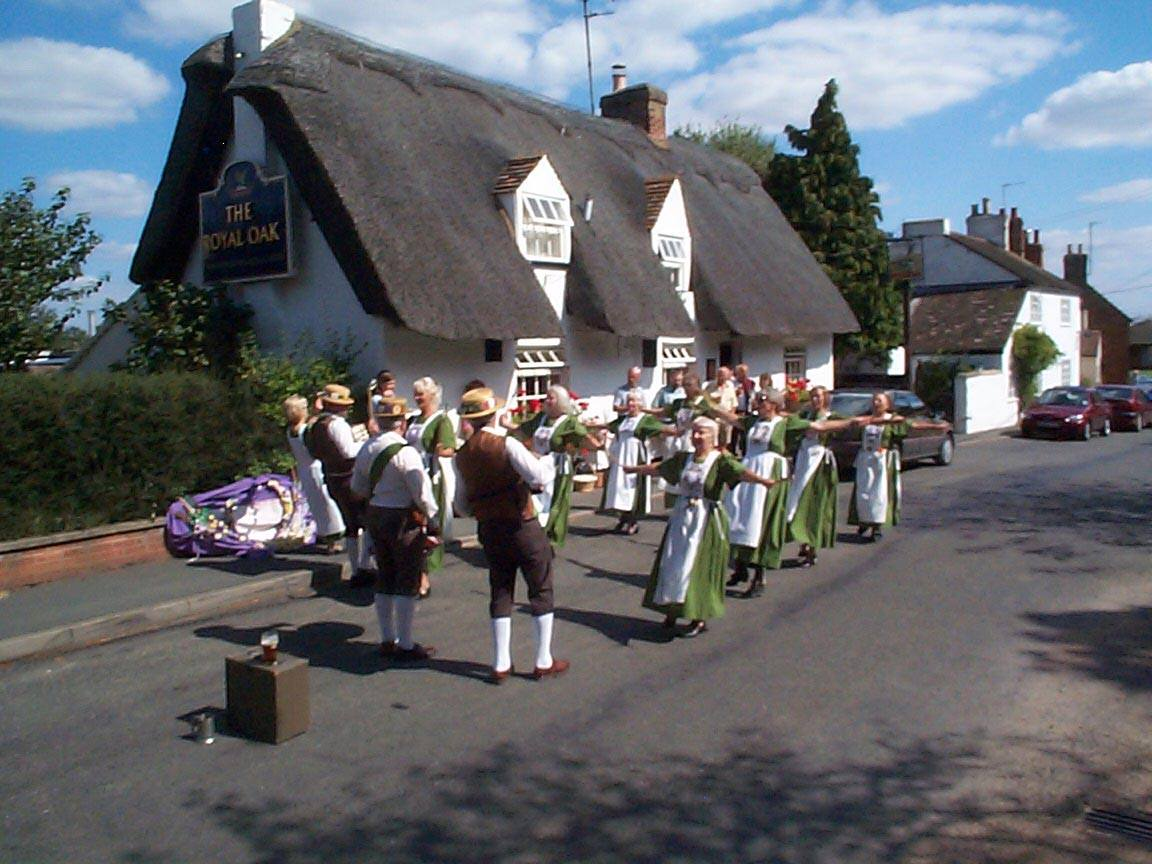
- Royal Oak Pub, Hail Weston, 2002
- Shire county: Cambridgeshire
- Region: East
- Country: England
- Sovereign state: United Kingdom

The Royal Oak is a 17th-century pub in the village of Hail Weston, Cambridgeshire (historically Huntingdonshire). It is the last remaining pub in the village, which has a population of roughly 600, and has a long history as a community centre.

== History ==
The Royal Oak is a grade II listed building with a traditional thatched roof. Inside, the exposed beams and posts have been preserved, as well as the fireplace. According to surveyors, it was built at around 1750.

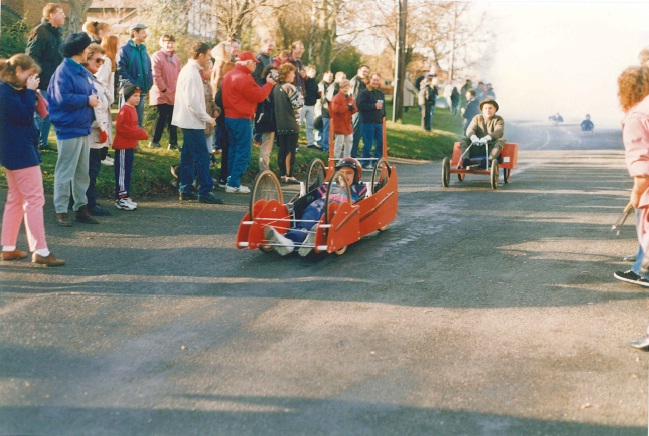
New Year go-kart races, Hail Weston, 1997

A number of local traditions revolve around the Royal Oak. These include the New Year's Day go-kart contest, where homemade push-karts are raced along the high street. An Easter Egg hunt is held each year in the pub gardens and the traditional Heartsease group dances around the pub every summer.

In one era an "onion bowl" was held (a variation on boules). The pub opened its kitchens for competitors to prepare their onions and the bowl then took place in the garden. The Royal Oak has also hosted the "egg dump" (a more dramatic version of conkers using eggs), a charity bicycle ride raising funds for Action Medical Research, a fun run and regular celebrations at national holidays such as Christmas, Easter and New Year.

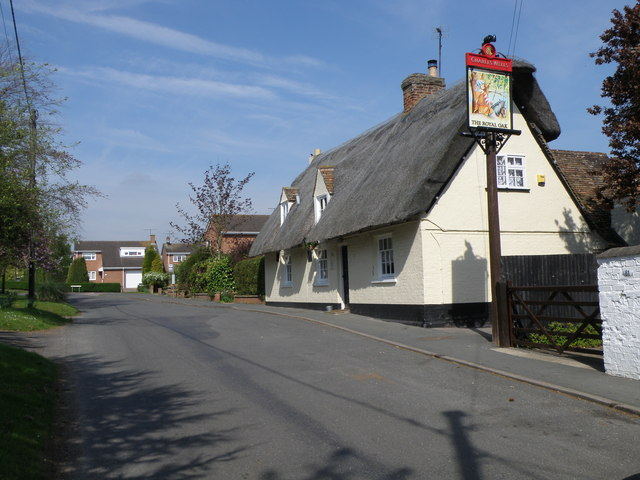
The Royal Oak in 2009

In one of the more bizarre parts of the pub's history, the remains of a cat were uncovered in the cellar walls during renovations. The exact connection the cat had with the pub are unknown. The landlord, Keith Nightingale, speculated it may have been placed there as "a good luck charm". The owners at the time opted to restore the cat to its resting place in the wall, where it remainsy.

For several decades, the Royal Oak was rumoured to host ta ghost. As reported in the Hunts Post newspaper in 1983, some patrons claimed that they could hear bells and occasionally singing monks in the bar room chimney.

== Community buyout ==
In November 2011, the Royal Oak was sold by the Charles Wells Pub Company to a private buyer. Six weeks later, on New Year's Day, the pub was closed and in March 2012 it was put up for auction. It failed to sell and was auctioned again two months later when once more, it failed to sell.

At the same time, a community group, the Hail Weston Community Pub Society (HWCPS), was formed in the hope of buying the Royal Oak and running it as a community pub.

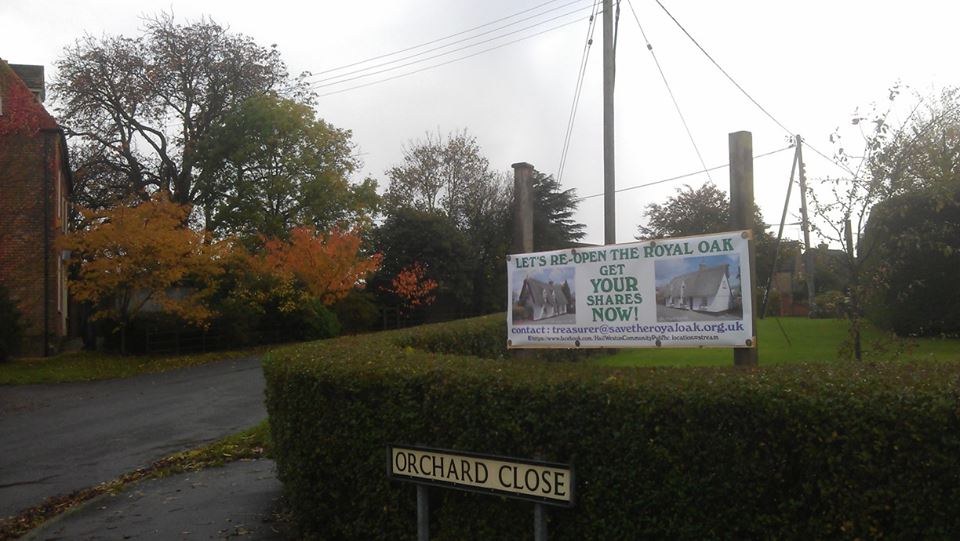
A poster displayed in the village of Hail Weston during a community campaign to save the Royal Oak

In late 2012, HWCPS registered the Royal Oak as an Asset of Community Value under the newly passed Localism Act 2011, the first to be registered in Huntingdonshire, and in November 2013 made a formal offer for the Royal Oak.

The offer was not accepted, news which made the front page the Hunts Post at the time. HWCPS made another, significantly higher, offer in 2015, but this was also rejected.

In 2016, after several years of negotiations, a group of villagers and members of HWCPS joined together to make a fresh bid to buy the pub. On 31 January 2017, a sale finally went through and a grand re-opening was planned for the spring.

== Reopening ==
Renovation and restoration work began in the following weeks with the assistance of around 50 volunteers. The old kitchen was stripped out and the room restored as a bar room. During the works, a pre-Victorian bread oven was discovered in the walls. The bar was rebuilt with reclaimed wood and a new stone floor was laid. At the rear of the pub, in the 1960s era extension, a new kitchen was built from scratch.

On 19 May 2017, the Royal Oak formally reopened.

== Present era ==
The Royal Oak is currently open Wednesday to Sunday. It has a regular quiz night on Sunday evenings and a bridge night on Thursdays. In the summer, open air film screenings have become a fixture and a series of beer and music festivals have been held in the garden, including the newly created WestFest, which was held in August 2018 and August 2019.

The Royal Oak won CAMRA's award for Most Improved Rural Pub in Huntingdonshire in October 2017.

== See also ==
- Pub names § Royal Oak
