= The Royal Oak, Edinburgh =

Pub in Edinburgh, Scotland

The Royal Oak
- "The Oak"
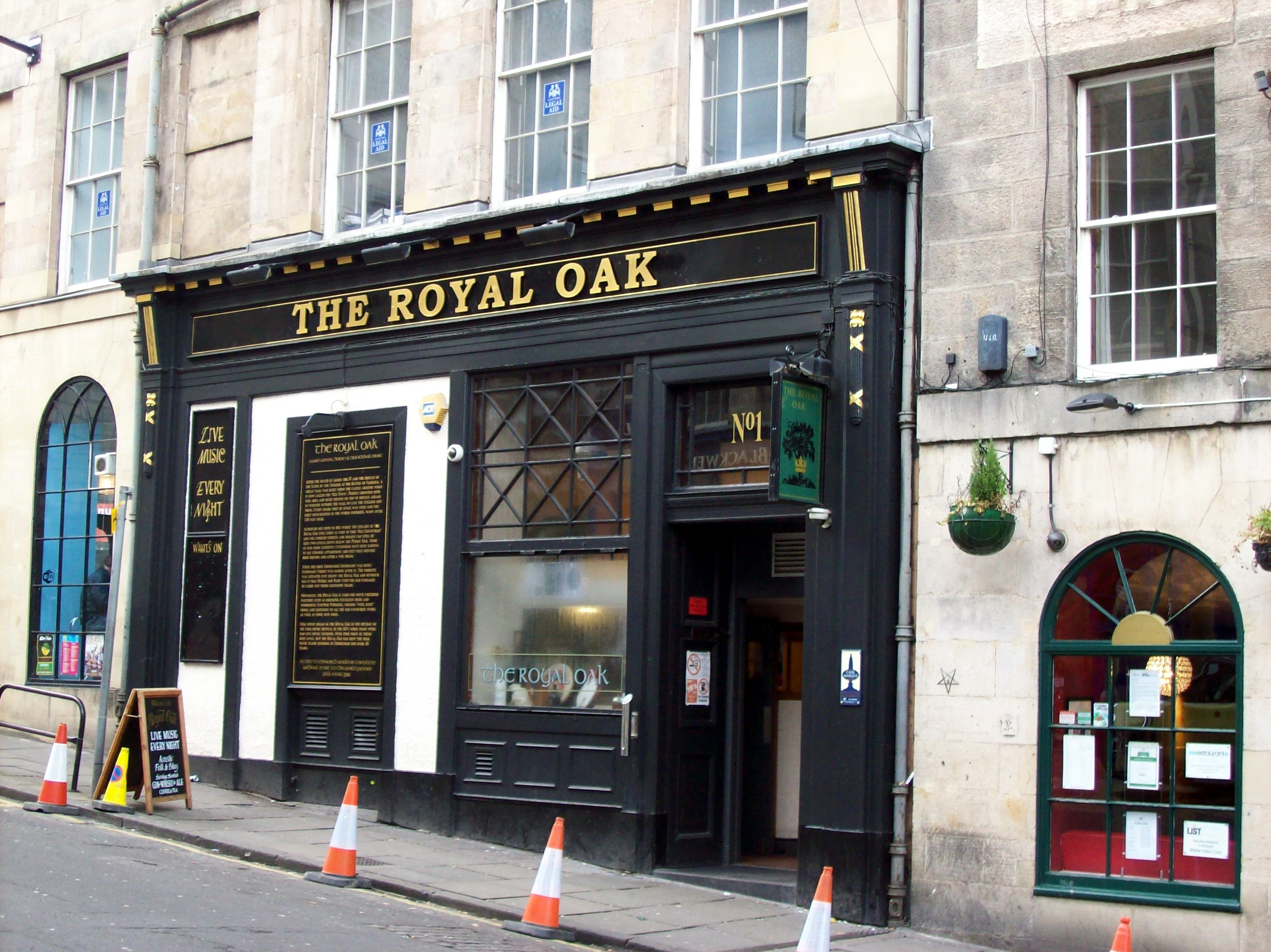
- Interactive map of The Royal Oak
- Address: 1 Infirmary Street, Edinburgh, Scotland, UK
- Location: Edinburgh, Scotland
- Coordinates: 55.94803352°N 3.18615906°W
- Type: Public House
- Event: Folk Music

Website
- www.royal-oak-folk.com

The Royal Oak is a 200 year old pub and folk music venue in the Scottish capital city, Edinburgh. It is well known for its live music sessions and counts various high profile Scottish musicians amongst its former resident performers, such as Kris Drever, Bobby Eaglesham, Danny Kyle and Karine Polwart.

During the 1960s, The Royal Oak was owned by the former Heart of Midlothian footballer Alan Anderson, though during his time there, it was called 'The Pivot'. It gained a reputation as a folk music venue after Dorothy Taylor took over the pub in 1978, which she ran alongside her sister Sandra – a former star of The White Heather Club TV Show – until 2003, when the current licensee Heather Mckenzie took over.

In 2008, Magic Park Records released The Royal Oak: Best of Folk, an album produced by Calum Wood featuring musicians from the Royal Oak and the wider Scottish folk scene, including Kris Drever and Aberfeldy. The album featured a foreword by novelist Ian Rankin, entitled Folk at the Oak, in which he recalled visiting the pub since his student days in 1978 and reflected on its tradition of informal live music. and The Royal Oak's resident folk club (The Wee Folk Club) was awarded 'Club of the Year' at the annual Scots Trad Music Awards.

The indoor decor features lyrics and poem excerpts from various local artists including former patron, Nick Keir.

The Royal Oak features in Ian Rankin's 'Set in Darkness', an Inspector Rebus novel. The scene is – according to Rankin – his favourite of all the pub scenes in the Rebus series.
