= Donington, Shropshire =

Hamlet in Shropshire, England

Coordinates: 52.643°N 2.285°W

Donington
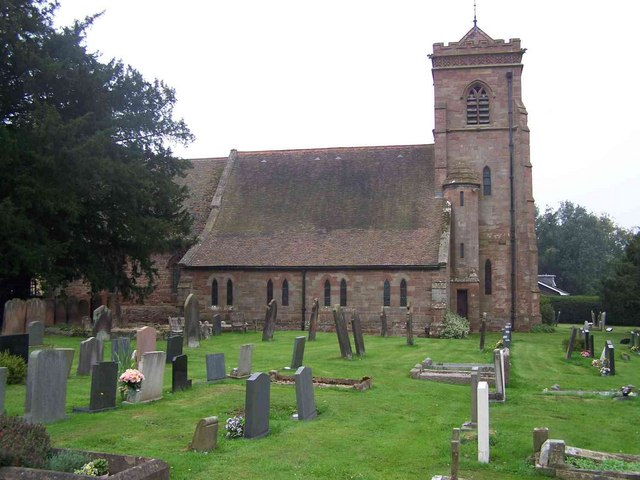
- St Cuthbert's church, Donington

- Location within Shropshire
- Population: 3,544 (2001 Census)
- OS grid reference: SJ8104 (381500, 304500)
- Civil parish: Albrighton and Donington
- Unitary authority: Shropshire
- Ceremonial county: Shropshire
- Region: West Midlands
- Country: England
- Sovereign state: United Kingdom
- Post town: Wolverhampton
- Postcode district: WV7
- Dialling code: 01902
- Police: West Mercia
- Fire: Shropshire
- Ambulance: West Midlands
- UK Parliament: The Wrekin

Donington is a village in the civil parish of Albrighton and Donington, in Shropshire, England.

On 1 April 2025 the parish was abolished and merged with Albrighton and Boscobel to form "Albrighton and Donington". Prior to that it shared a parish council with the neighbouring parish of Boscobel, due to the latter's small population.

== Geography ==
The hamlet is situated on the northern outskirts of the large village of Albrighton. Albrighton Moat, a scheduled monument dating from the 13th century, is situated within the hamlet.

The parish was geographically large, however, and includes Cosford and RAF Cosford, as well as encompassing a small part of the village of Albrighton (close to the railway station). The M54 motorway passed through the parish, as does the Wolverhampton to Shrewsbury Line; Albrighton railway station was on the border of the parishes of Donington and Albrighton, as is the Donington and Albrighton Nature Reserve. Wigmore Wood was within the parish. Donington is located 9.9 miles away from Wolverhampton and 10.6 miles away from Telford

To the east of the parish is Staffordshire.

== St. Cuthbert's Church ==
St. Cuthbert's Church in Donington is over 900 years old. It was founded by Roger de Montgomery. The old church tower had collapsed on 25 March 1879, and was rebuilt in 1880. Different parts of the church are from different eras. For example, the lower part of the tower was built in the 12th Century, whereas other parts of the building were built in the 17th and 18th centuries.

This Church is a grade II listed building and has been since 26 September 1984.

Many air force personnel from RAF Cosford are buried in the churchyard. 23 of them are in World War II Commonwealth service war graves, which are marked and cared for by the Commonwealth War Graves Commission (CWGC). Also buried from the same war are four Polish airmen. The dead include former British Olympic fencer Group Captain Frederick Sherriff. The CWGC also register the graves of two British Army officers of World War I.

The church is separated from the extremely close parish church of St Mary Magdalene at Albrighton by Humphreston Brook. The legend is that two sisters disagreed about the nature of the architecture of the church, and so resolved to build their own churches right next to each other. St Cuthbert's Church is also very close to St Cuthbert's Well, a holy well and grade II listed building that is located within Donington and Albrighton Nature Reserve.

Edward Bradley, later a writer who was better known under his pen-name Cuthbert Bede, held his first incumbency here as vicar of Donington in 1857-59.

== Population trends ==
In 1801, the recorded population for the parish of Donington was 289 people. The population has steadily increased over the years except for some decades such as the 1850s. After World War II, the population for this parish had risen from a pre-war figure of 329 to over 3000 in the 1950s. According to census records from the 1800s into the 1930s, the ratio of males to females living within Donington was roughly the same, until after World War II when the parish saw a large increase in the male population in the area. This is because of the location of RAF Cosford, which is included within the Donington parish. The 2001 census also shows the number of people in different age groups. The census shows us that for the Donington area the most populated age group was 16–24. This could be because the RAF base at Cosford is included in these data statistics. In general, however, the 2001 census shows that there are more people living in the parish under the age of 44, than there are over that age.

== Employment ==
According to the 1881 census the main sources of employment within Donington were either in agriculture or in domestic services. The same census also shows that these jobs were mainly dominated by men, and most women living in Donington at the time had no employment. In comparison, the 2001 census shows that the employment structure has changed compared to that of 1881. The 2001 census shows that now over 2600 people now work in the service sector, and around 100 people now work in agriculture and manufacturing. There could be many reasons as to why there has been such a dramatic switch in terms of employment over the last 120 years, but it does follow the national trend for local parishes in terms of employment.

== Housing ==
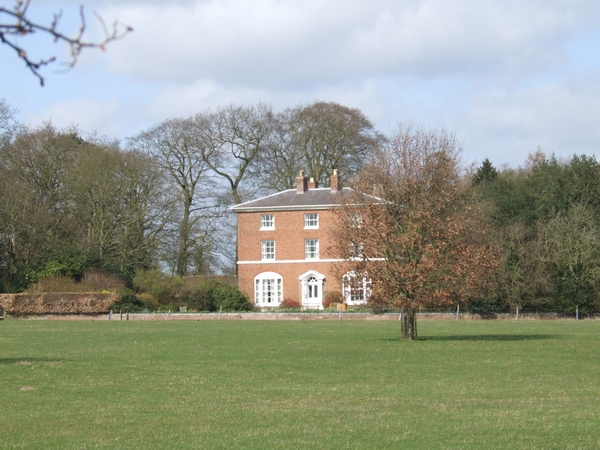
Shackerley Hall

Shackerley Hall is a small country house incorporating the remains of an 18th-century house; it is a listed building.

In 1891, the first census questions were focussed on the number of rooms and occupants of a house, there were 87 houses within the parish and Donington and that number in the 2001 census has risen to 587. In March 2012, according to Zoopla.com the average house price for the postcode WV7, which Donington and the rest of the parish fall under, was £215,074

== See also ==
- Listed buildings in Donington, Shropshire
