= Donington and Albrighton Nature Reserve =

Nature reserve in Shropshire, England

Coordinates: 52°38′17″N 2°17′02″W

Donington and Albrighton
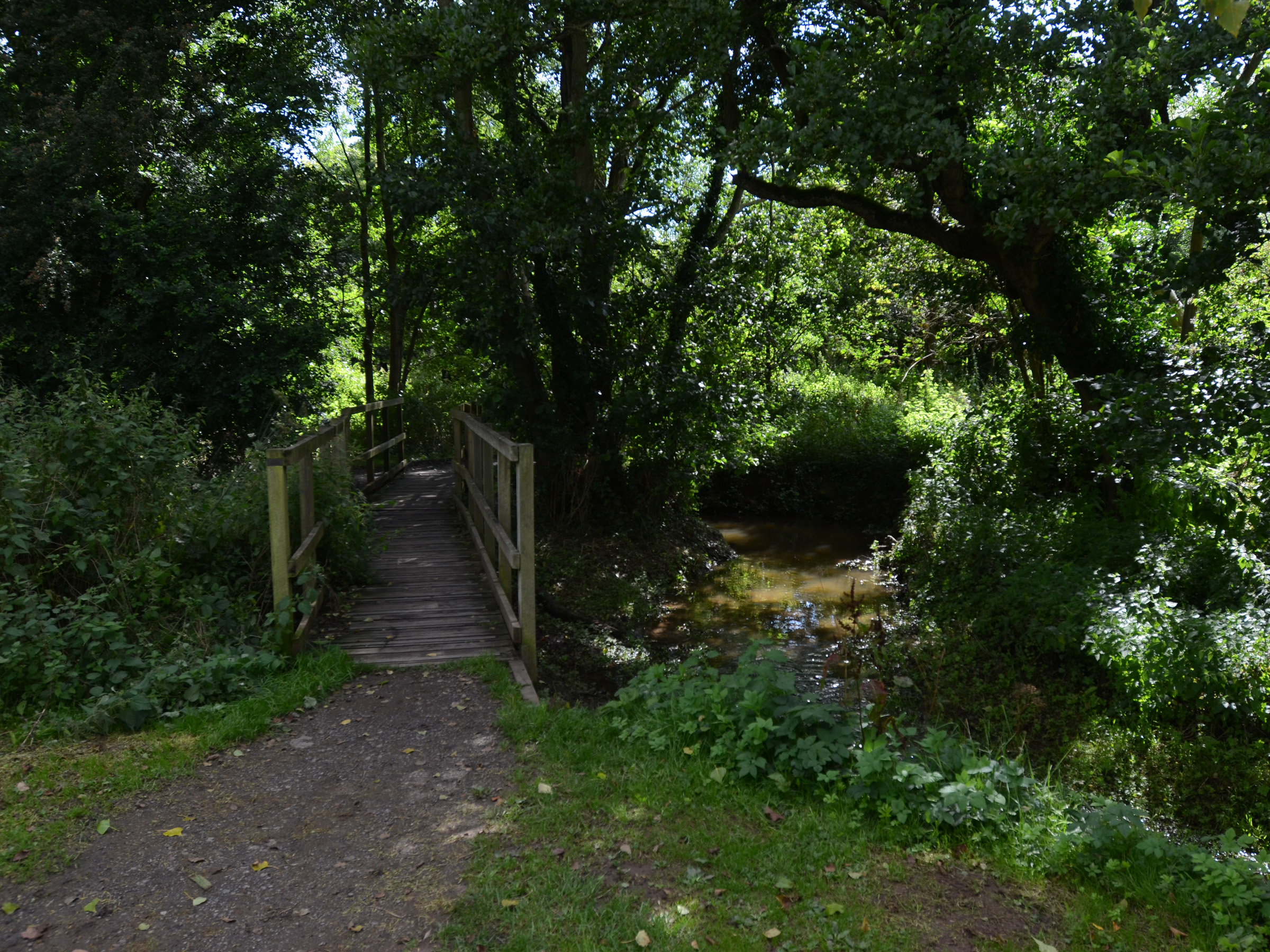
- Humphreston Brook flowing through Donington and Albrighton Nature Reserve
- Interactive map of Donington and Albrighton
- Type: Nature reserve
- Location: Shropshire
- Nearest city: Albrighton Village
- Area: 5.4 ha (13 acres)

Donington and Albrighton is a small nature reserve near the village of Albrighton. Not only is it a valuable site for wildlife and recreation in Shropshire, it is also the location of the historic St Cuthbert's Well.

== Location ==
The nature reserve is located within Albrighton Village, in Humphreston Brook Valley, which is in Shropshire. It is very close to St Cuthbert's Church at Donington. Travelling to the site can be done by train, car or bus; there is a car park next to St Cuthbert's Church that can be used to access the nature reserve. Postcode: WV7 3EP. Grid reference: SJ 809046.

== Wildlife ==
The main part of the reserve consists of St. Cuthbert's Meadow, which is mostly used as a recreational area by locals. Mature trees such as beech, hazel and oldyew trees make the area an important place for nesting birds. The Donington Pool itself is a valuable area for breeding wildfowl; some fishing is allowed in this pool, but it is done through the Royal British Legion. At the far side of Donington Pool, there is a willow carr woodland area, with streams and marshes. This woodland is not open to the public due to conflicting issues with health and safety, but it is still an important area for wildlife.

More than ninety different bird types have been found either in, or flying over, the site, and 30 bird species are known to breed in this reserve.

== History of the site ==
Historically, the margin marking the boundary between Donington and Albrighton was shown by the Humphreston Brook. John Talbot, a miller in the early 17th century, created Donington Pool by damming the brook at Rectory Road, in order to power his mill with a non-stop water supply. However, because of this damming, he was fined by Donington, but not by Albrighton due to permission for the mill already being approved.

The original pool that was created was bigger, but due to stages of hydrosere succession, it is gradually shrinking, and will eventually turn into marshland and wet woodland.

== St Cuthbert's Well ==
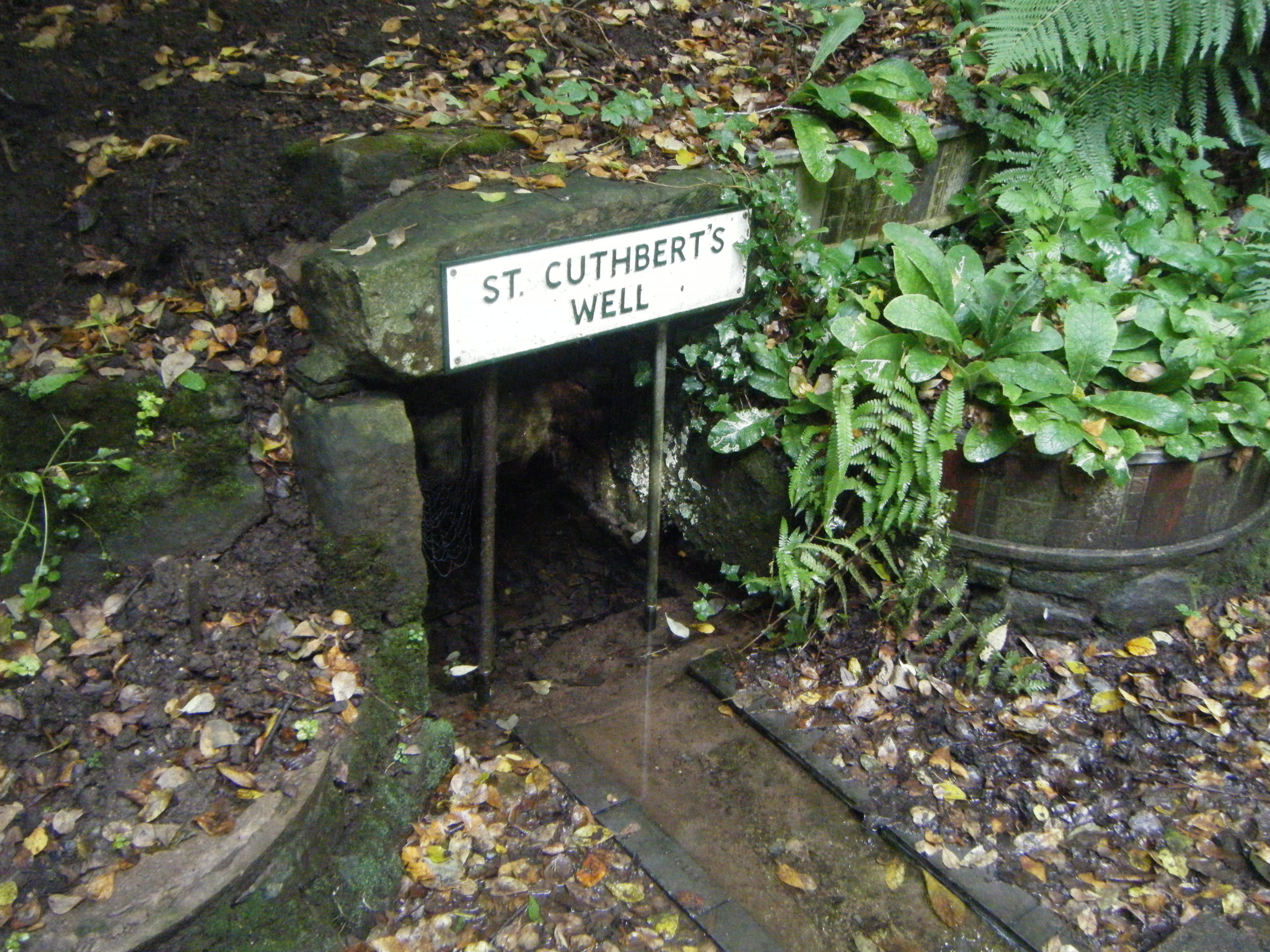
St Cuthbert's Well

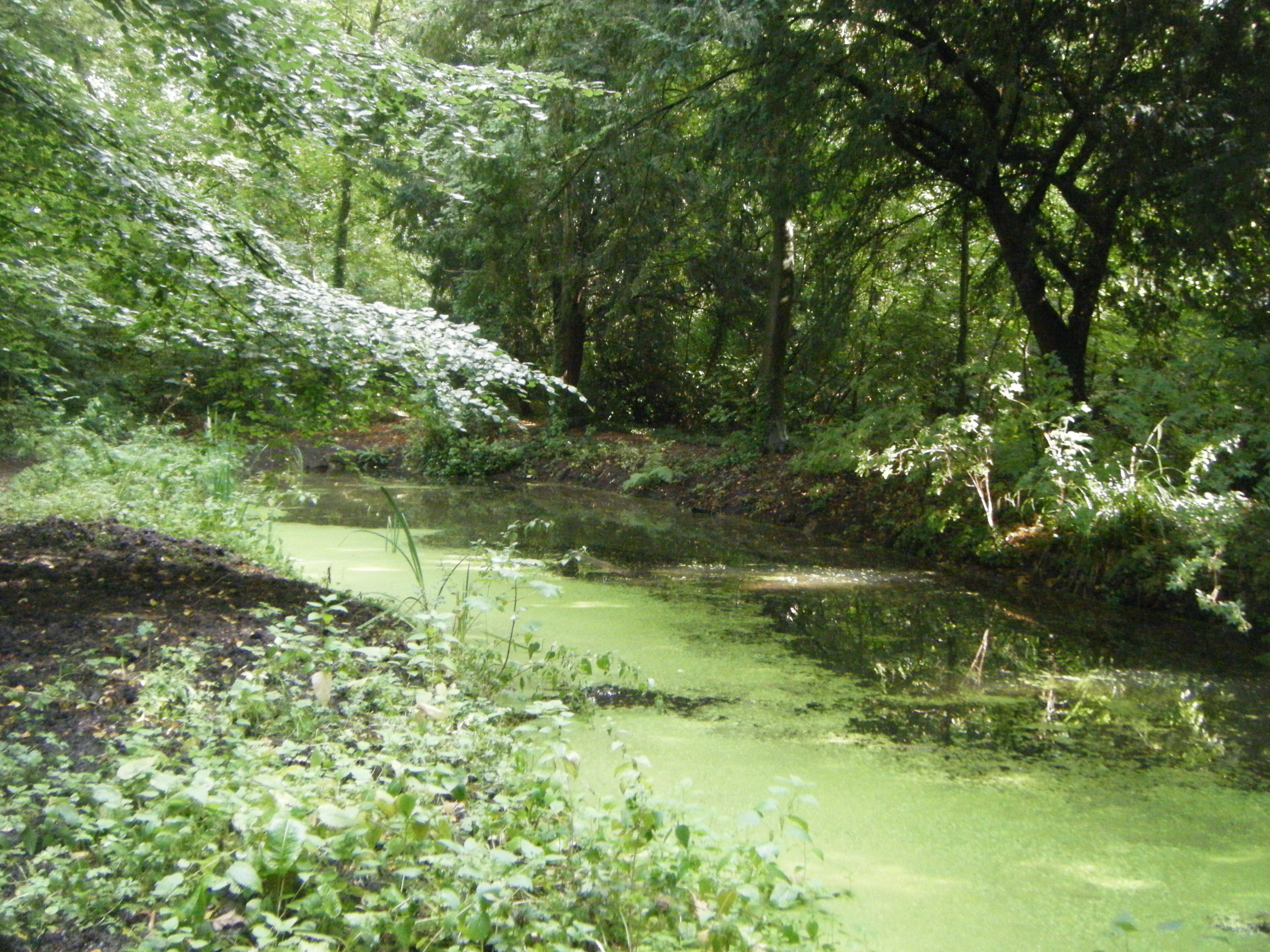
St Cuthbert's Pool, which is fed by the holy well. Ancient yew trees are visible on the banks of the pool

St Cuthbert's Well, which is located to the east of the nature reserve, was once believed to hold miraculous water that could cure the blind. Although the current structure is from the 19th century, it is thought that the well dates back to medieval times. The spring itself feeds into a small pool, which is known as St Cuthbert's Pool (not to be confused with Donington Pool). This pool is surrounded by old yew trees, which were often ceremonially planted by pagans around sacred sites; this indicates that the spring has been of spiritual importance for centuries. The well has been classed as a grade II listed building since 1984.

== Art and the Local Nature Reserve ==
The fishing pool in the LNR has been awarded £50,000 to be spent on improving access to the public and those with disabilities.

These improvements in Donington Pool, Albrighton, include new fishing pegs and an access platform to allow all visitors to get to the water's edge.

An art project funded by the arts council has recently occurred on this LNR site. This involved Richard Taylor, an artist who, with the help of the local people, designed the centre piece. This centre piece was placed in the pool, and is made up of copper sculpted fish, which have open mouths that spray water.

To represent the wildflowers present on the site, metal and glass sculptures were placed in the meadow, and brass rubbings were used to include the history of St. Cuthbert's well in the design.

As the area needs to be maintained, RAF Cosford Trainees were asked to help. This work involved repairing a pathway, and clearing vegetation.

== Gallery ==
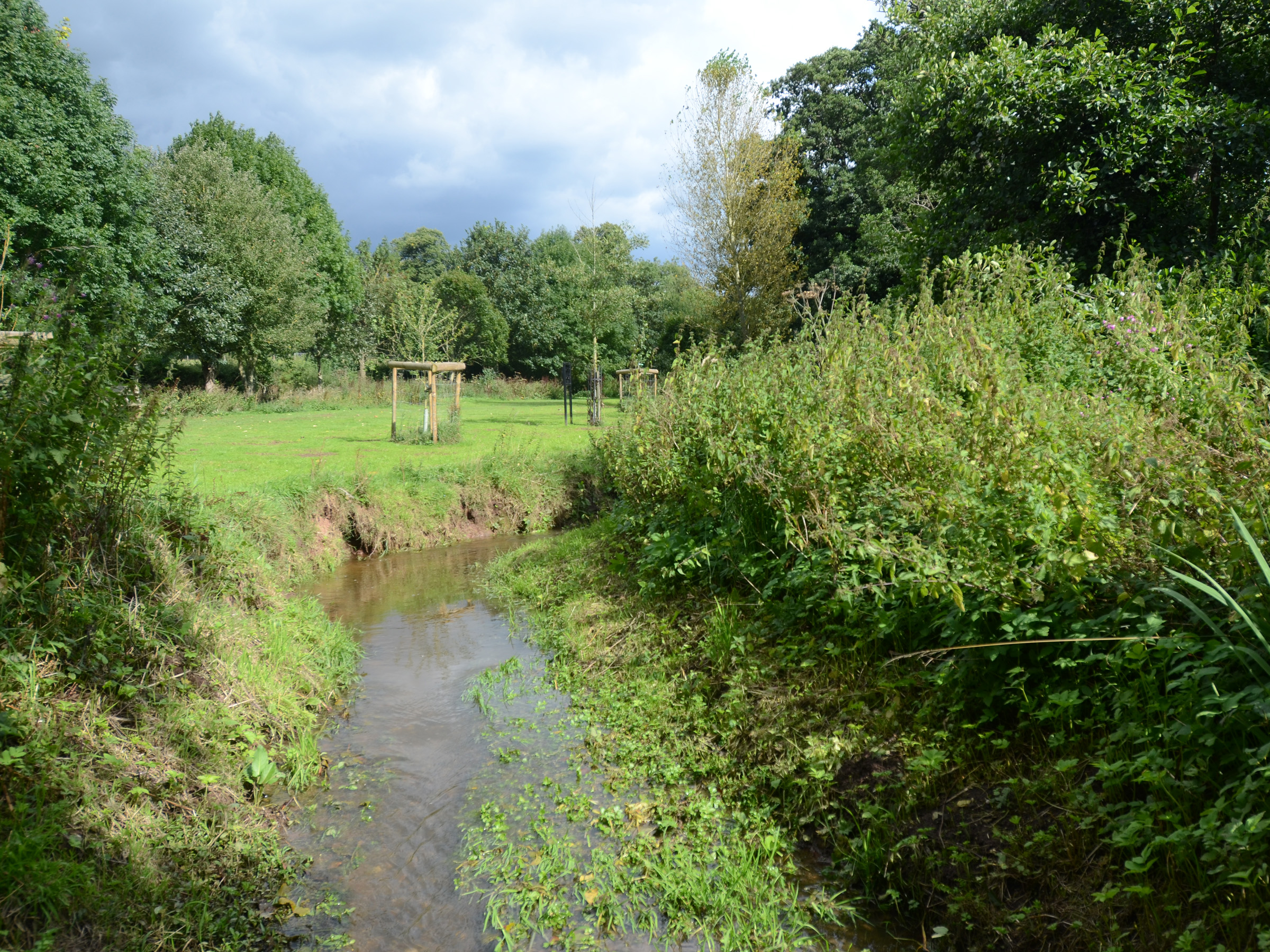
Humphreston Brook flowing through Donington and Albrighton Nature Reserve

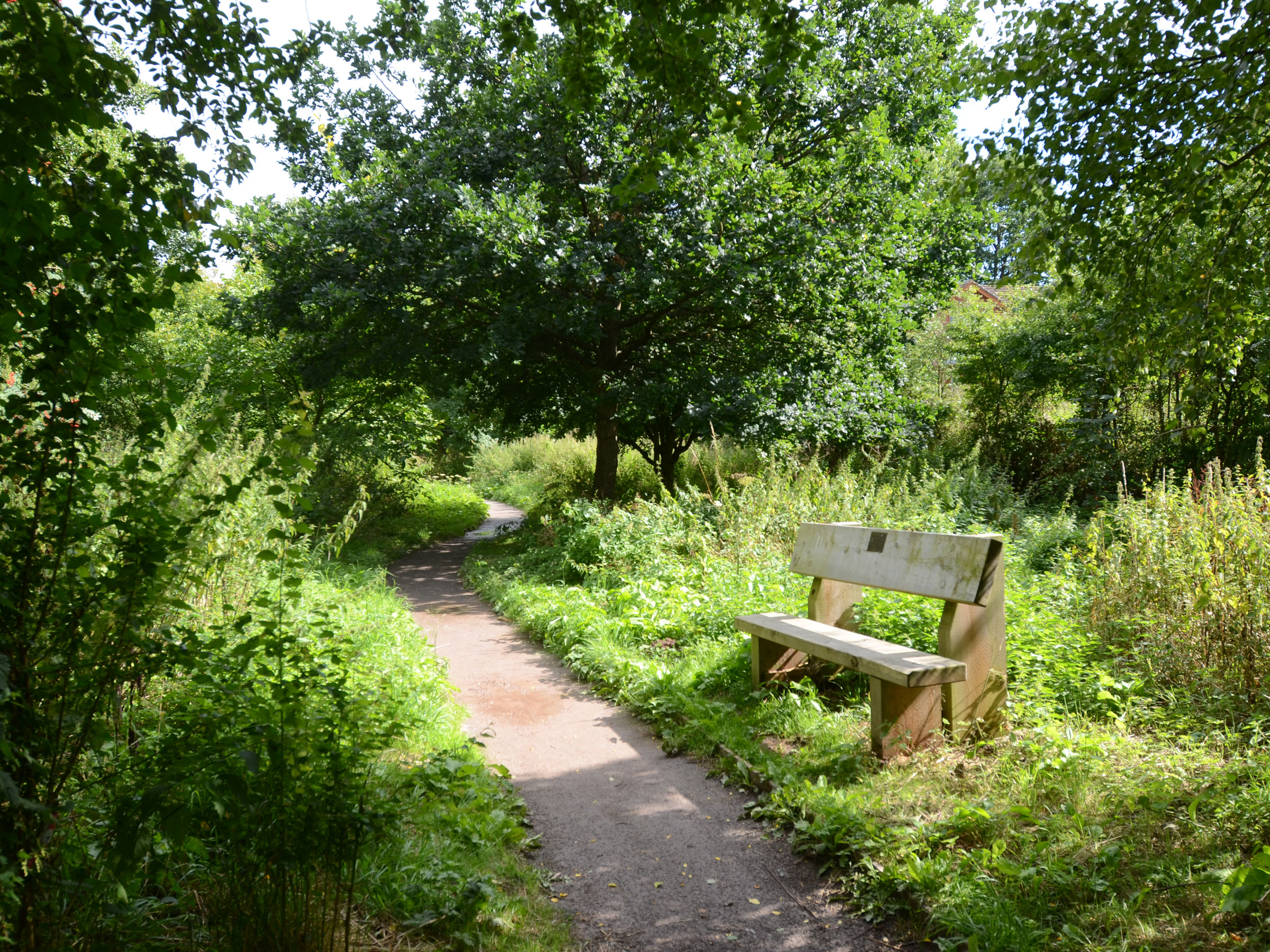
Donington and Albrighton Nature Reserve

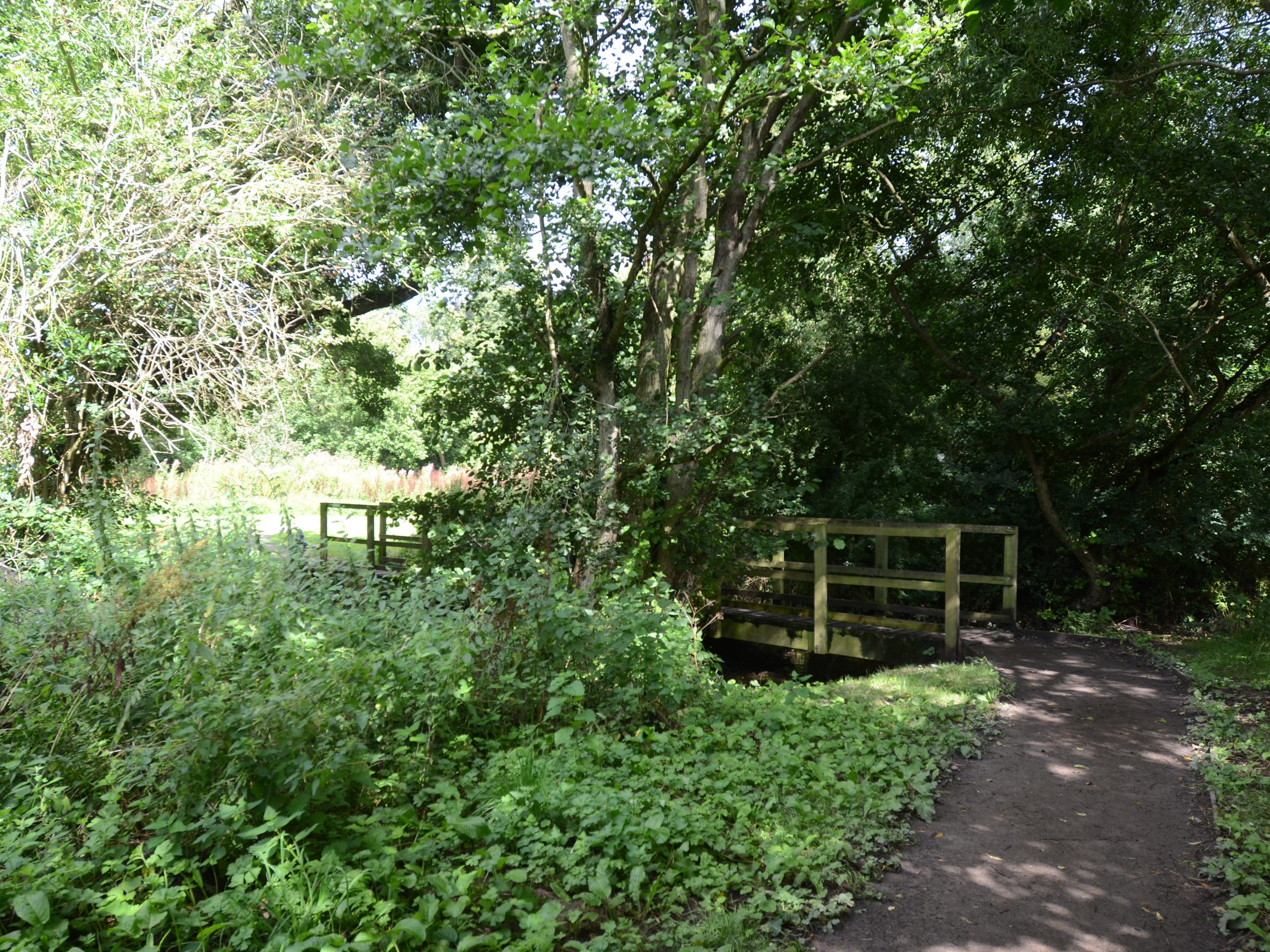
Humphreston Brook flowing through Donington and Albrighton Nature Reserve

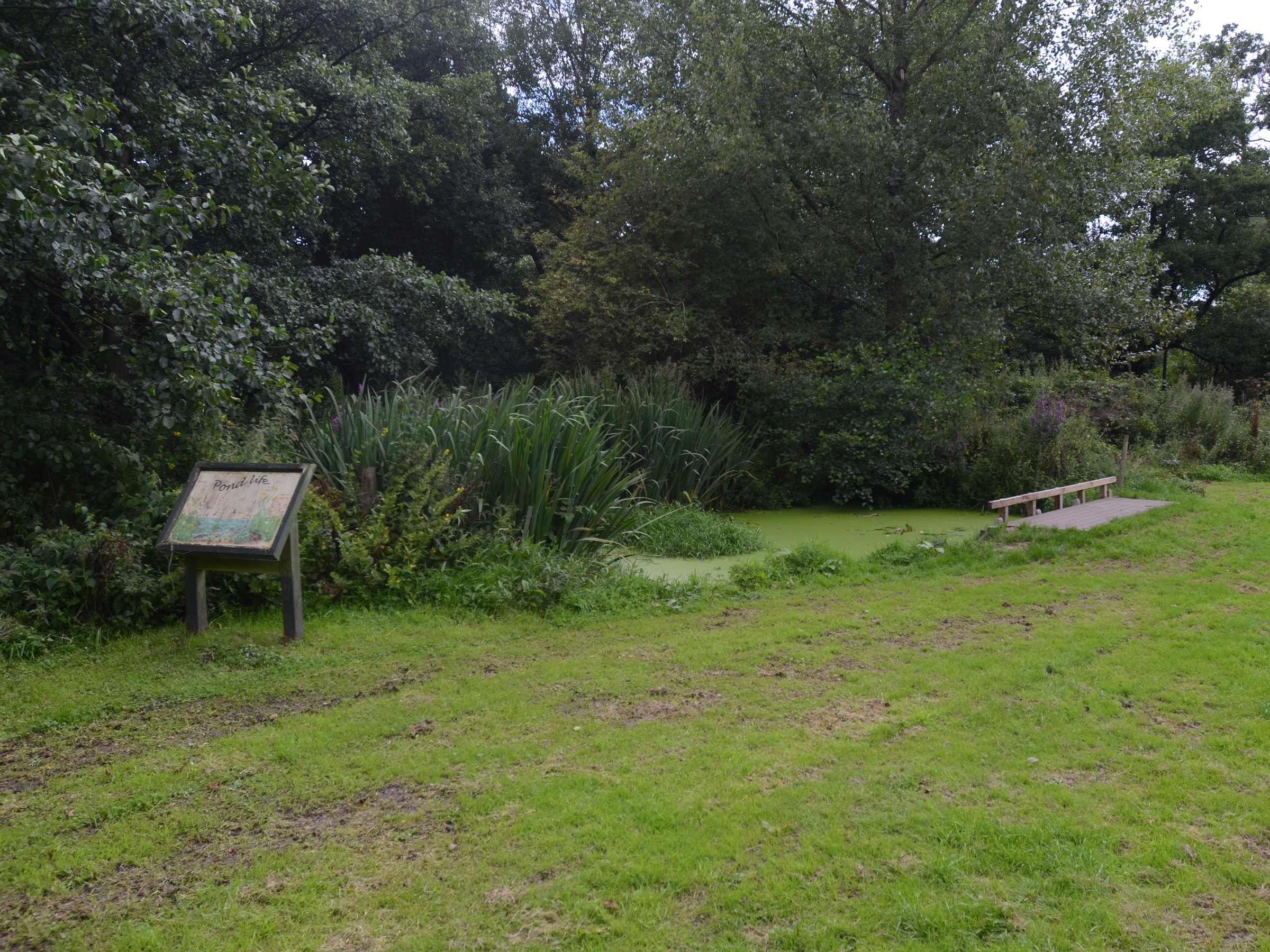
The pond life pool at Donington and Albrighton Nature Reserve

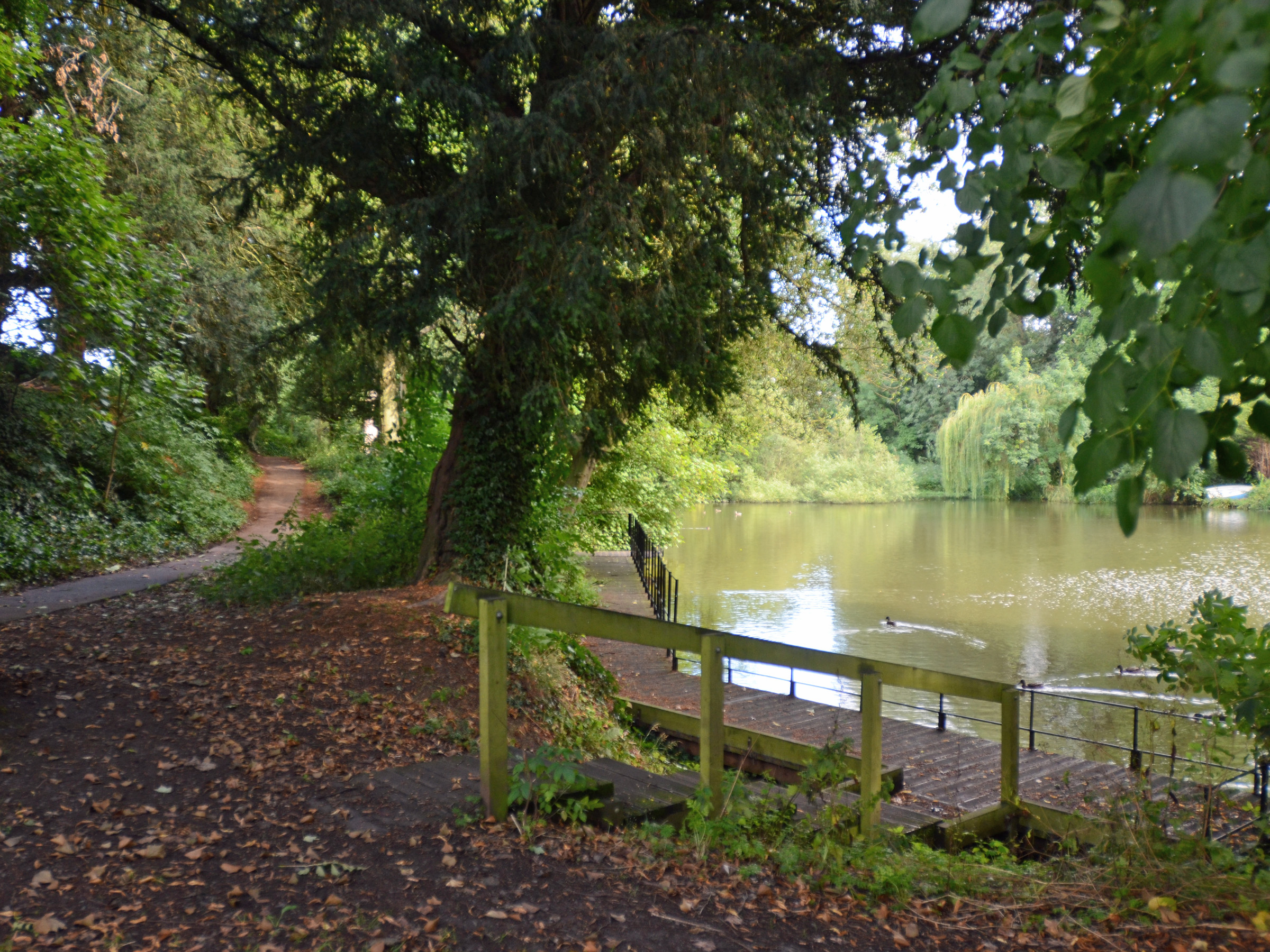
Humphreston Brook was dammed to form the big pool at Donington and Albrighton Nature Reserve

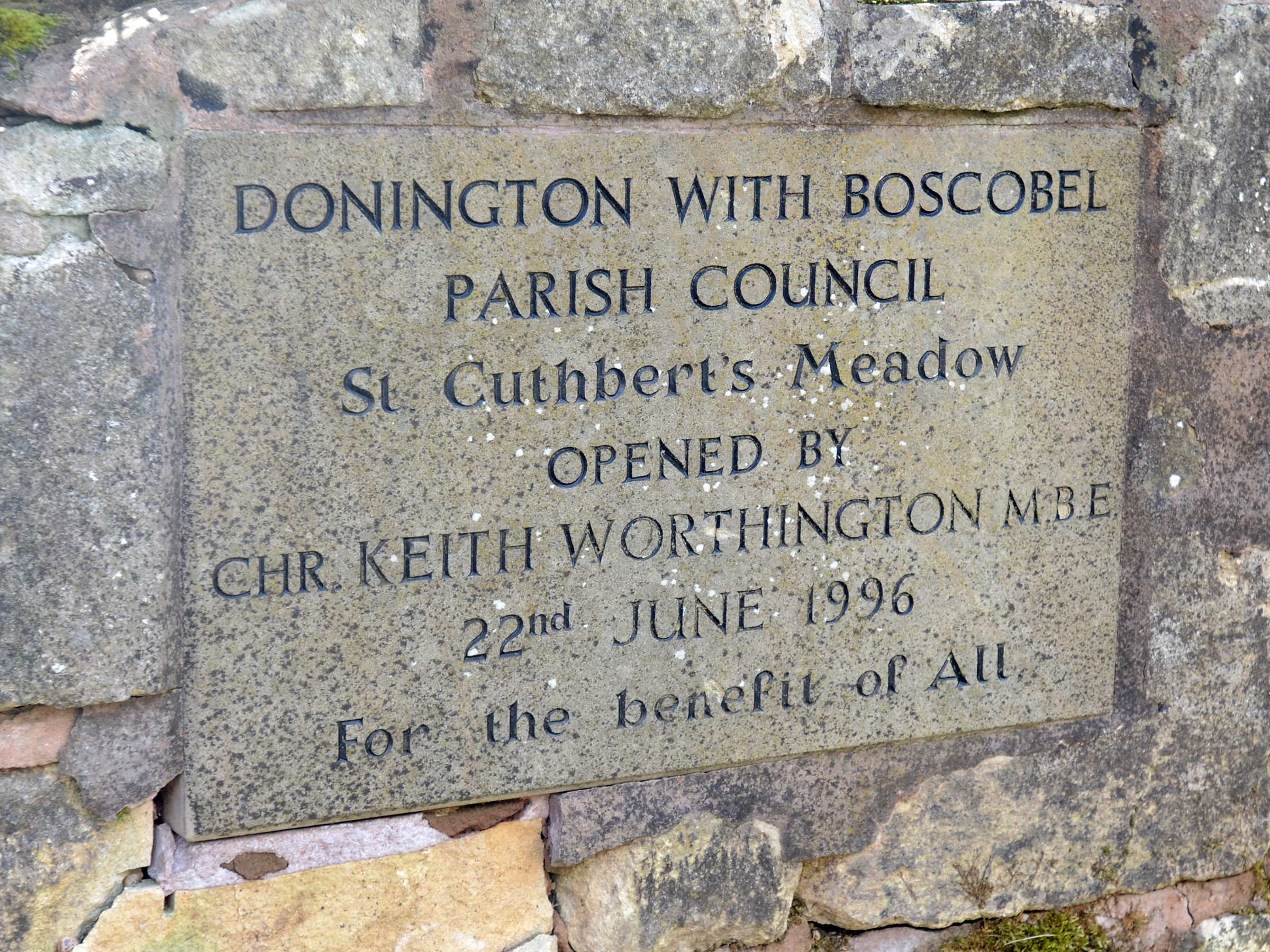
Sign on Donington road about St Cuthbert's meadow, the precursor of Donington and Albrighton Nature Reserve

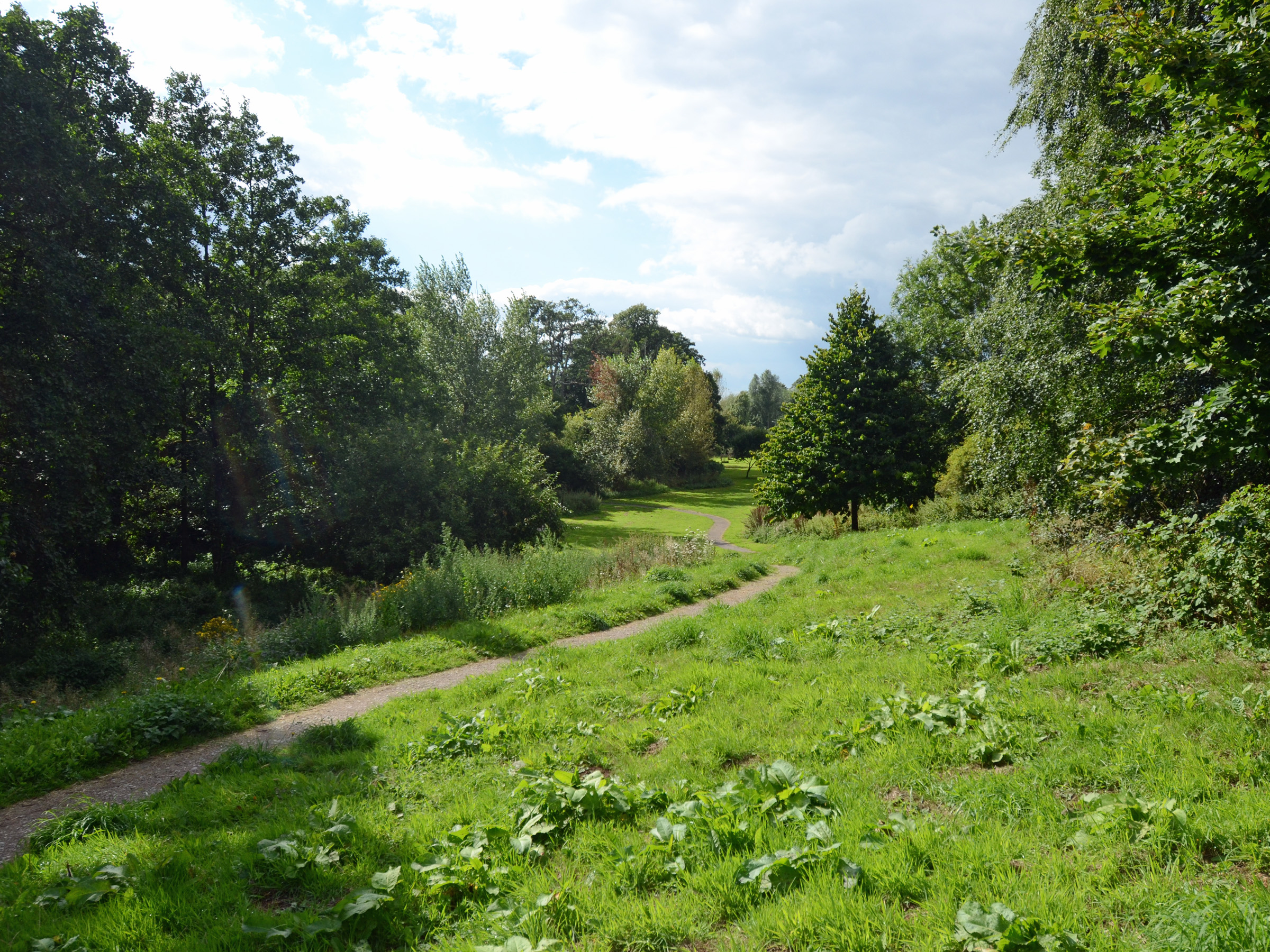
Looking north west across Donington and Albrighton Nature Reserve
