= Listed buildings in Donington, Shropshire =

Donington was a civil parish in Shropshire, England. It contained 17 listed buildings that are recorded in the National Heritage List for England. Of these, two are at Grade II*, the middle of the three grades, and the others are at Grade II, the lowest grade. The parish contained the village of Donington, countryside to the north, and RAF Cosford. Most of the listed buildings are houses, farmhouses and farm buildings. The other listed buildings include a church, a cross and a tomb in the churchyard, a holy well, and a block in RAF Cosford.

== Key ==
Grade	Criteria
II*	Particularly important buildings of more than special interest
II	Buildings of national importance and special interest

== Buildings ==
Name and location	Photograph	Date	Notes	Grade
St Cuthbert's Church; 52.63926°N 2.28395°W		Early 14th century	The oldest part is the chancel, the nave is dated 1635, in 1878–79 the north aisle and porch were added by John Norton, and in 1880 he rebuilt the tower. The church is built in red sandstone with tile roofs, and consists of a nave, a north aisle, a south porch, a chancel, and a west tower. The tower has three stages, diagonal buttresses, a hexagonal stair turret, a quatrefoil frieze, an embattled parapet with four gargoyles, and a brass weathercock.	II*
Churchyard cross 52.63916°N 2.28402°W		14th or 15th century	The cross is in the churchyard of St Cuthbert's Church, it is in sandstone, and has been converted into a sundial. There is a square socket stone on a possibly later plinth, with a cable moulded upper edge and grotesque faces on the corners. The fragment of the shaft is about 0.8 metres (2 ft 7 in) high with a square base broaching to become octagonal.	II*
Humphreston Hall; 52.64322°N 2.27148°W	—	15th century	A manor house that was remodelled in the 16th and 17th centuries and altered later, it is timber framed with brick infill, some cladding in brick, a sandstone gable end and tile roofs. There are two storeys with attics, it originally consisted of a hall and a cross-wing, with later additions giving a T-shaped plan. The hall range, probably of four bays, contains mullioned or mullioned and transomed windows. The cross-wing, also probably with four bays, contains casement windows, and has a gable end jettied at the upper floor and attic.	II
Lower Dairy House; 52.64663°N 2.25552°W	—	15th century	The farmhouse was remodelled in the 17th and 18th centuries, and later altered and extended. It has a timber framed core, partly encased and extended in brick, with tile roofs. There are two storeys and an L-shaped plan. The house originated as a three-bay hall, with bays added at each end, a brick range at right angles to the north, and a north extension to the hall. In the centre is a gabled porch, the windows are casements, and there are three gabled half-dormers. Inside is a truncated base cruck truss.	II
Kilsall Hall; 52.65406°N 2.29759°W	—	15th or 16th century	The house, at one time an inn, is pebbledashed on a stone plinth with tiled roofs. There are two storeys and an attic, and a front of five bays, the central bay gabled and containing the doorway. The windows are sashes and there are gabled dormers.	II
Barn and cowshed, Humphreston Hall; 52.64336°N 2.27048°W		Early 16th century	Originally a domestic building, it is in sandstone on a plinth, with a tile roof and four bays. In the north wall is a blocked Perpendicular doorway with a Tudor arched head, two doorways with round heads, and a doorway with a flat chamfered lintel. There are mullioned windows in the gable ends, and to the north is a lean-to open shelter carried on cylindrical iron columns.	II
Black Well Cottage; 52.64883°N 2.26670°W	—	17th century	A cottage later extended and divided into two. The original part is timber framed with plastered infill and a tile roof. It has one storey and an attic, and four bays. On the front is a gabled porch with bargeboards, flanked by 20th-century bow windows. There is also a casement window and four gabled dormers.	II
Barn northeast of Humphreston Hall; 52.64341°N 2.27093°W	—	17th or 18th century	The barn is timber framed with red brick infill on a sandstone plinth, with weatherboarding on the east gable end. The roof is tiled, there are two storeys, and there are double doors at the east end.	II
Donington House; 52.64712°N 2.27311°W	—	Mid to late 18th century	A red brick house on a stone plinth with a moulded stone eaves cornice, brick end piers with plastered capitals, and a double-span tile roof with coped verges. There are three storeys and cellars, and a symmetrical front of five bays. The central doorway has pilasters, a rectangular fanlight and a pediment. The windows are sashes, those in the lower two storeys with moulded keystones.	II
The Wood; 52.65868°N 2.25051°W	—	Mid to late 18th century	A red brick house on a plinth, with a moulded eaves cornice, and a double-span tile roof with a parapet between the ridges. There are three storeys and three bays, and sash windows. The central stone porch has a moulded entablature and above the door is a fanlight with a lantern. In the left return are two two-storey bow windows.	II
Shackerley House; 52.65457°N 2.27566°W	—	Late 18th century	A red brick house on a plinth with a dentilled eaves cornice and a tile roof. There are two storeys and an attic, an L-shaped plan, and a symmetrical front of three bays, the central bay projecting and gabled. In the centre is a doorway with pilasters and a rectangular fanlight, and the windows are sashes with plastered lintels.	II
Lower Wood Farmhouse; 52.65071°N 2.26236°W	—	c. 1800	A red brick farmhouse with a dentilled eaves cornice, and a hipped tile roof. There are two storeys and three bays, the central bay gabled. The doorway has a rectangular fanlight a small entablature and a pediment, and the windows are sashes with plastered lintels.	II
Shackerley Hall; 52.65261°N 2.28156°W		c. 1800	A small country house incorporating the remains of an 18th-century house. It is in red brick on a stone plinth, with a storey band, a moulded eaves cornice, and a hipped slate roof. There are three storeys and a symmetrical front of three bays. In the centre is a Tuscan porch with a small entablature and an open pediment, and above the door is a radial fanlight. The windows are sashes, those in the ground floor with three lights in arched recesses.	II
Chest tomb 52.63936°N 2.28384°W	—	c. 1840	The chest tomb is in the churchyard of St Cuthbert's Church, and is in sandstone. It has scalloped shell and trailing leaf decoration on the long sides, and corner pilasters with Gothic traceried panels. The inscription is illegible.	II
St Cuthbert's Well; 52.63848°N 2.28451°W		19th century (probable)	A holy well, most likely of medieval origins. The well is terraced into a bank, and feeds into the nearby St Cuthbert's Pool.	II
Fulton Block, RAF Cosford; 52.64919°N 2.30726°W		1937–38	The block was built to provide accommodation and training facilities for the Royal Air Force. It is in brick and concrete, and in Moderne style. There are four storeys, and a central block flanked by four projecting blocks on each side. The windows are steel-framed casements, and between each block is an entrance bay containing a doorway with pilasters and a canopy.	II
Neach Hill; 52.65386°N 2.31113°W	—	Undated	A country house.	II
