= St Mary Magdalene's Church, Albrighton =

Coordinates: 52°38′14″N 2°16′59″W

St Mary Magdalene's Church
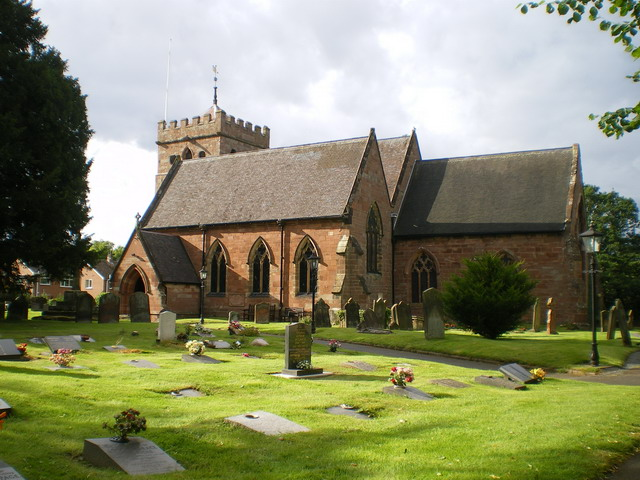
- St Mary Magdalene's Church
- OS grid reference: SJ 80939 04427
- Location: Albrighton
- Country: England
- Denomination: Church of England
- Website: https://www.albrightonparishchurch.org.uk

History
- Dedication: Mary Magdalene

Architecture
- Heritage designation: Grade II*
- Designated: 26 September 1984
- Style: Early English
- Completed: 1181

Specifications
- Materials: Red sandstone

Administration
- Diocese: Lichfield
- Archdeaconry: Salop
- Deanery: Egmond and Shifnal
- Benefice: Albrighton, Boningale and Donington
- Parish: Albrighton

St Mary Magdalene's Church, Albrighton is the 12th-century parish church of Albrighton, Shropshire. It is the largest church in the village, and has been designated as a Grade II* listed building since 1984.

== History ==
Although it is likely that there was a church in Albrighton prior to the 12th century, the current building was constructed in 1181. In the 13th century, the chancel and south aisle were added to the church. To make room for church bells, the roof of the tower was raised in 1549 — the tower itself dates from the 12th century. Between the years of 1852 and 1853, under the direction of H.J. Stephens of Derby, the interior of the church was restored, and the north aisle was built, as well as a porch. The church also contains the family tomb of the Talbot family, including the final resting place of Charles Talbot, the only Duke of Shrewsbury, George Talbot, 9th Earl of Shrewsbury (a Catholic priest), and Francis Talbot, 11th Earl of Shrewsbury, among others.

== Notable features ==
=== Tomb of Sir John Talbot ===
The alabaster tomb of Sir John Talbot, who died in 1555, and his wife, Lady Frances Giffard, is located within the chancel. They were ancestors of several later Earls of Shrewsbury. Traces of colour are still visible upon the tomb.

=== The Pitchford Tomb ===
The Pitchford Tomb is said to date from the 14th century. Originally, it was discovered beneath the south aisle in 1853, and was moved into the churchyard, only to be moved again, in 1921, back into the church. The tomb is so called because the Pitchford family shield is located on its side; the shields of other families who played a part in the maintenance of the church are also displayed on the tomb.

== Churchyard ==
=== Churchyard cross ===
A sandstone churchyard cross, the base of which dates from either the 14th or 15th century, is located within the churchyard. The shaft and head were repaired in the 20th century. The cross is grade II* listed.

=== Chest tomb of Ann Gold ===
The sandstone tomb of Ann Mary Gold, dating from 1805, and located within St Mary Magdalene's churchyard, is a grade II listed monument.

=== War graves ===
Four British service personnel have Commonwealth war graves in the churchyard: two soldiers from World War I and a soldier and Home Guardsman of World War II.

== In legend ==
The church is separated from the extremely close parish church of St Cuthbert (Donington) by Humphreston Brook. The story is that two sisters disagreed about the nature of the architecture of the church, and so resolved to build their own churches right next to each other.
