= Listed buildings in Albrighton, Bridgnorth =

Albrighton is a village in the civil parish of Albrighton and Donington, in Shropshire, England. It contains 36 listed buildings that are recorded in the National Heritage List for England. Of these, two are listed at Grade II*, the middle of the three grades, and the others are at Grade II, the lowest grade. The parish contained the large village of Albrighton, the smaller village of Cosford, and the surrounding countryside. Most of the listed buildings consist of houses in the villages, and farmhouses and farm buildings in the surrounding countryside. The other listed buildings include a church and structures in the churchyard, public houses, a railway station and bridges, a water pumping station, and a war memorial.

== Key ==
Grade	Criteria
II*	Particularly important buildings of more than special interest
II	Buildings of national importance and special interest

== Buildings ==
Name and location	Photograph	Date	Notes	Grade
St Mary's Church; 52.63724°N 2.28313°W		12th century	The oldest part of the church is the tower, which was later heightened. The chancel dates from the 14th century, and the nave was rebuilt in 1853. The church is in sandstone with tiled roofs, and consists of a nave, north and south aisles under separate roofs, a south porch, a chancel with a north organ chamber and vestry, and a west tower. The tower has three stages, the lower parts are Norman, and it has clasping buttresses, a large south window, lancet windows, pointed windows and circular openings in the bell stage, gargoyles, and an embattled parapet. The windows in the nave contain Decorated tracery.	II*
Churchyard Cross; 52.63707°N 2.28321°W		14th or 15th century	The cross is in sandstone. It has a plinth of four steps, the lower two steps original and the top two steps 20th-century replacements. On this is a socket stone with cable carving, and an octagonal tapering shaft. The bottom metre of the shaft is original, the rest and the foliated cross head are from a restoration in the early 20th century. The cross is also a Scheduled Monument.	II*
Shrewsbury Arms; 52.63679°N 2.28382°W		Late 15th or early 16th century	A house, later a public house, it is timber framed with brick nogging on a plinth of sandstone and brick, and has a tiled roof. The building originated as a hall and a cross-wing, and the main surviving part is the cross-wing facing Church Road. This has two storeys, the upper storey jettied, and three bays. In the ground floor are two bay windows, one rectangular, the other canted. A fragment of the former hall faces High Street, it is plastered and contains a bay window and an entrance.	II
The Crown Inn; 52.63488°N 2.27815°W		16th century	A house, later a public house, remodelled in the 18th century. It is timber framed and encased in red brick, with a modillion eaves cornice and tiled roofs. Its basic structure is of a hall with cross-wings, and there are two storeys with attics. The central block has three bays, the left bay slightly projecting, with a gabled porch in the middle. The windows are casements, those in the central block having bracketed sills and, in the ground floor, triple keystones. In the upper floors and gables of the cross-wings is applied timber framing.	II
The Elms Farmhouse 52.63306°N 2.28876°W	—	16th or 17th century	A house, extended and altered in the early 18th century, it is in red brick on a sandstone plinth, the east entrance wall is rendered in lime, and it has corner pilasters, a moulded eaves cornice, and a tile roof. There are two storeys with attics, five bays with gables, and a single-storey extension to the left. The sandstone doorcase has a moulded entablature and scroll brackets. The windows are casements with raised keystones.	II
High House Farmhouse; 52.63264°N 2.25010°W	—	17th century	The farmhouse was later extended and altered. It is partly timber framed and partly in brick, and is pebbledashed, with a dentilled eaves cornice, and a tile roof. There are two storeys, a gabled left wing with two bays and one storey with an attic, and a one-storey extension to the front. The windows are 20th-century casements, and on the left wing is an external staircase.	II
Chastleton; 52.64422°N 2.23465°W	—	Mid to late 17th century	A timber framed house with a pebbledashed exterior, a dentilled brick first floor band, a dentilled eaves cornice, and tiled roofs. The house has an L-shaped plan with a main range of two storeys and three bays, and a cross-wing with one storey and an attic and two bays. There are later extensions to the cross-wing and to the rear of the house. On the front is a 20th-century porch, the windows are 20th-century casements, and in the cross-wing is a dormer.	II
77 High Street; 52.63412°N 2.27628°W		Early 18th century	A house, later a shop, in red brick, with end pilasters, a dentil eaves cornice, and a tiled roof. There are three storeys, and three bays. The doorway is in the centre, through a 20th-century shop front, and the windows are sashes, those in the middle floor with segmental heads. Above the entrance is a gilded mortar and pestle shop sign.	II
Bowling Green Farmhouse; 52.63525°N 2.29916°W	—	Early 18th century	The farmhouse is in red brick on a sandstone plinth, with end pilasters, a moulded stone eaves cornice, and a hipped tile roof. There are two storeys and five bays. In the centre is a sandstone doorcase with a moulded entablature. The windows are sashes with segmental heads and raised keystones.	II
Harriot's Hayes; 52.64374°N 2.23954°W	—	Early 18th century	A rendered house with a concrete tiled roof, two storeys with an attic, and four bays. The second bay projects slightly and is gabled. The main doorway has a plain pediment, and the windows are sashes in architraves.	II
31 High Street; 52.63373°N 2.27590°W	—	Early to mid 18th century	A brick house with a moulded eaves cornice and a tiled roof. There are three storeys and three bays. The entrance is in the right bay, and the windows are casements, those in the lower two floors with plastered lintels and fluted keystones.	II
The Manor House; 52.63462°N 2.27837°W		Early to mid 18th century	A red brick house on a plinth with bands, a moulded eaves cornice, and a tiled two-span roof. There are three storeys and three bays, and a later range at right angles at the rear. In the centre is a Tuscan portico with detached columns, pilasters, an open pediment, and a door with a rectangular fanlight. The windows are sashes. In front of the house are cast iron railings and gate posts.	II
Barn, The Elms; 52.63295°N 2.28816°W	—	18th century (probable)	The original part of the barn is timber framed with brick nogging, and has three bays. The longer part to the right is in red brick, and the barn has a tiled roof.	II
The Old Windmill; 52.63390°N 2.29292°W		18th century	A former tower mill converted into a house, It has a sandstone base with a stepped plinth, three storeys, the upper parts in brick, and at the top is a projecting wooden storey. The doorway and windows date from the 20th century.	II
Harriot's Hayes Farmhouse; 52.64236°N 2.24151°W	—	Mid to late 18th century	A brick farmhouse on a plinth, with bands, a modillion eaves cornice, and a tile roof. There are two storeys with an attic, three storeys and a rear extension. The central doorway has plain plasters, and the windows are sashes.	II
Meeson Hall; 52.63373°N 2.27011°W		Mid to late 18th century	The house has a pebbledashed front on a plinth of sandstone and brick, with a concrete parapet behind which are three gables with tiled roof. There are three storeys and four bays, and the entrance is in an extension to the northeast. This has a portico with pilasters, a semicircular fanlight, and an open pediment, and the windows are sashes.	II
73 High Street; 52.63399°N 2.27572°W		Late 18th century	The house is in red brick with a slate roof. There are two storeys and an attic, a front of three bays, and a rear extension. In the centre is a doorway with pilasters and a rectangular fanlight, and the windows are sashes.	II
The Grey House; 52.63385°N 2.27646°W		Late 18th century	The house has a roughcast front and the sides and rear are rendered. It has a plastered eaves cornice and a two-span tiled roof. There are two storeys with an attic, a front of three bays, and a right wing. The entrance is in the wing, and the windows are casements with plastered lintels and fluted keystones.	II
The Oaklands; 52.63700°N 2.28394°W	—	Late 18th century (probable)	A red brick house with a sill band, a stone eaves cornice, and tiled roofs. It has two storeys with attics, two bays, extensions to the right and the rear. The entrance is in the right extension, and the windows are sashes.	II
The Red House; 52.63529°N 2.27846°W	—	Late 18th century	A red brick house on a sandstone plinth, with a modillion eaves cornice and a hipped tile roof. There are three storeys and three bays. In the centre is Tuscan portico with detached columns, pilasters, a triangular pediment, and a door with a fanlight. The windows are sashes.	II
Beechurst; 52.63683°N 2.28421°W		Late 18th or early 19th century	A pebbledashed house with a dentilled eaves cornice and a hipped tile roof. There are two storeys, a front of three bays, and two gabled rear wings. The central door has a rectangular fanlight, and the windows are sashes.	II
The Pound; 52.63397°N 2.27299°W	—	18th or 19th century	The wall of the pound facing the street is in red sandstone with ridged capping, and the other walls are in brick. The pound has been altered with the insertion of a rear entrance, and an internal division to make two spaces. The roof is in corrugated iron.	II
Wall, Cosford Grange Farm; 52.63796°N 2.31920°W	—	18th or 19th century	The stone wall incorporates older, possibly medieval material. It is about 1.4 metres (4 ft 7 in) high and 65 metres (213 ft) long, with ridged capping. Some of the stones have residual moulding.	II
Chest tomb (south); 52.63707°N 2.28301°W	—	1805	The chest tomb is in the churchyard of St Mary's Church and is to the memory of Ann Mary Gold. It is in sandstone, and has panelled ends on the long sides, an oval inscription panel with fluted fans in the spandrels, and moulded capping.	II
2 and 4 Church Road; 52.63654°N 2.28426°W	—	Early 19th century	A pair of red brick houses on a plinth, with a dentilled eaves cornice, and a tiled roof. They have three storeys and three bays each. In the centre of each is a doorway with fluted pilasters, and the windows are sashes.	II
Chest tomb (north); 52.63710°N 2.28299°W	—	Early 19th century	The chest tomb is in the churchyard of St Mary's Church. It is in sandstone, and has fluted corner pilasters, a moulded top, and festooned garlands on the long and short sides. The dedication is illegible.	II
Pedestal shaped memorial 52.63713°N 2.28277°W	—	Early 19th century	The memorial is in the churchyard of St Mary's Church, and is in sandstone. It has the shape of a pedestal, and has a moulded plinth, and a truncated pyramidal top. The dedication is illegible.	II
Whiston House; 52.62949°N 2.30312°W	—	Early 19th century	A brick house on a stone plinth, with wide modillion eaves and a hipped slate roof. There are two storeys and three bays, and the windows are sashes. On the front is a recessed porch with a semicircular arch, and to the west is a shallow two-storey three-window bow window.	II
70 and 71 High Street; 52.63392°N 2.27506°W		Early to mid 19th century	A pair of houses in red brick, No. 71 rendered, with a dentilled eaves cornice, brick pilaster strips between the bays, and a slate roof. They have two storeys, No. 70 has three bays, and No. 71 has two, No. 71 has two canted bay windows, and No. 71 has one. In the centre of No. 70 is a Tuscan doorcase and a doorway with a rectangular fanlight, and to the left of No. 71 is a round-headed doorway with a semicircular fanlight. The windows are sashes, apart from the windows in the bay window of No. 71, which are casements. In front of No. 71 are cast iron railings.	II
Cosford Grange and Farmhouse; 52.63796°N 2.31978°W	—	Early to mid 19th century	The remodelling of an earlier building, it is stuccoed on a sandstone cellar, with hipped slate roofs and two storeys. The grange has three bays, a central projecting Tuscan portico and sash windows. The right wing forms the farmhouse which is in similar style but with closer windows.	II
Cosford Grange Lodge and walls 52.63710°N 2.32156°W		Early to mid 19th century	The lodge is in sandstone on a plinth, with a sill band and a hipped slate roof. There is a single storey, and a front of five bays, the left bay projecting as a porch with a round-headed entrance and a round-headed doorway. The windows are sashes. At the entrance to the drive are low quadrant walls.	II
Railway Bridge; 52.63835°N 2.26955°W		1848	The bridge carries the railway at a skew over Station Road. It consists of girders flanked by parapets, all in cast iron. The parapets have four panels with rounded corners. The girders and parapets are carried on piers of blue brick with stone dressings.	II
Railway Station and Footbridge; 52.63815°N 2.26930°W		1849	The railway station was built by the Shrewsbury and Birmingham Railway. It is in red brick with stone dressings and a slate roof, and is in Italianate style. There are five bays, the fourth bay being a two-storey gabled cross-wing, and the other bays having one storey. In the third bay is a loggia with two arches. The openings have round-arched heads, and the gable has moulded bargeboards and a finial. The footbridge was added by the Great Western Railway in about 1880, and is in wood and cast iron.	II
Beamish Farmhouse; 52.63420°N 2.25783°W	—	Mid 19th century	The farmhouse is in rendered brick with a tile roof. There are three storeys and three bays. In the centre is a simple portico and a door with a fanlight. The windows are sashes, those in the ground floor with three lights.	II
Cosford Water Pumping Station; 52.63879°N 2.32544°W		1857	The water pumping station was extended in 1889. It is in red brick with sandstone dressings, a sandstone basement, bands, a dentilled cornice, and a hipped slate roof. The building is in Italian Renaissance style, it has two storeys and a basement, a front of five bays, and three bays on the sides. All the openings have round heads. In the ground floor they contain a pair of doors and a window above. In the upper floor each bay has a pair of windows.	II
War Memorial; 52.63737°N 2.28496°W		1920	The war memorial is in wood, and consists of a carved calvary under a curved canopy. The figure of Christ is carved in olive wood. The memorial is 2 metres (6 ft 7 in) high, and on the shaft are carved the names of those lost in both World Wars. The memorial stands on a stone base of two steps.	II
