= Cosford, Shropshire =

Village in Shropshire, England

Coordinates: 52.637°N 2.317°W

Cosford
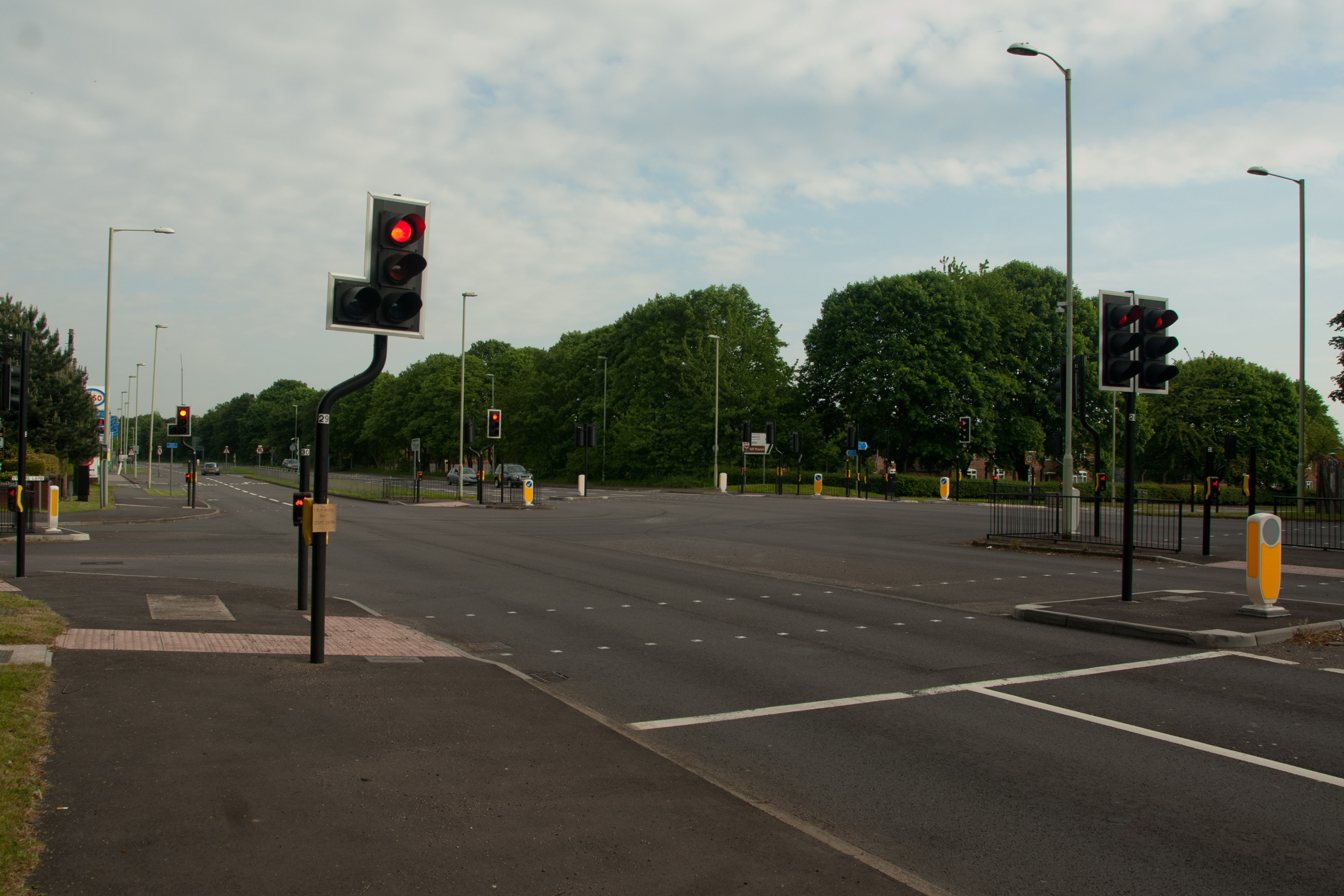
- The crossroads in Cosford village on the A41 road

- Location within Shropshire
- OS grid reference: SJ785044
- Civil parish: Albrighton and Donington
- Unitary authority: Shropshire
- Ceremonial county: Shropshire
- Region: West Midlands
- Country: England
- Sovereign state: United Kingdom
- Post town: WOLVERHAMPTON
- Postcode district: WV7
- Post town: SHIFNAL
- Postcode district: TF11
- Dialling code: 01902
- Police: West Mercia
- Fire: Shropshire
- Ambulance: West Midlands
- UK Parliament: The Wrekin

Cosford is a village in Shropshire, England. It is located on the A41 road, which is itself just south of junction 3 on the M54 motorway. The village is very small and is mostly made up of dwellings that house Royal Air Force personnel who work at the adjacent RAF Cosford.

== History ==
Brewer's Dictionary of Britain & Ireland suggests that the name originates from the Old English of Cost, which means Excellent and ford (crossing). It lies between the town of Shifnal and the large village of Albrighton, in the parish of Albrighton and Donington. It has a railway station on the Wolverhampton to Shrewsbury Line. At the 2011 Census, Cosford was listed as part of a Shifnal ward.

Cosford Grange and Cosford Mill, the sites of which were both located on Albrighton Brook, are now quite remote from the village of Cosford in terms of access because the expansion of the airfield required land from the formation of Worcester Road (which used to connect the A41 and the A464 in a north–south direction). Also on the A464, is Cosford Pool, created to help power the mill and Cosford Pumping Station, built by the Wolverhampton Corporation in 1857. The listed buildings of the pumping station are still there and operated by Severn Trent Water.

Cosford Brook runs from where Ruckley and Neachley Brooks meet just west of RAF Cosford. This is the local name as it remains Ruckley Brook and upon reaching Cosford Bridge on the A464 it becomes the River Worfe.

The village is dominated by RAF Cosford, which is home to the Royal Air Force Museum Cosford, a major visitor attraction and heritage centre. The base itself is built on former farmland, with the outdoor athletics arena being on the site of Sydnal Farm's buildings. The village (and RAF Base) is split into two by the A41 road which runs from London to Birkenhead. The A41 has a junction with the M54 motorway just 1 mile (1.6 km) north of Cosford.

== Notable people ==
- Nicholas Witchell (born 1953 in Cosford) retired journalist, newscaster and Royal correspondent for BBC News.
- Suzi Perry (born 1970) television presenter, was born in the village.
- Justin Mortimer (born 1970) contemporary painter.
- Asa Charlton (born 1977), footballer who has played almost 400 games

== See also ==
- Listed buildings in Albrighton, Bridgnorth
