= Asa Charlton =

English footballer

Personal information
- Full name: Asa Edmund Charlton
- Date of birth: 1 December 1977 (age 48)
- Place of birth: Cosford, England
- Position: Defender

Team information
- Current team: Walsall Wood

Youth career
- 1994–1996: Kidderminster Harriers

Senior career*
Years	Team	Apps	(Gls)
1996–1997	Willenhall Town		
1997–1998	Telford United	7	(0)
- Rushall Olympic
–2002	Stourport Swifts		
2002–2003	Worcester City	16	(0)
2003–2004	Halesowen Town	69	(6)
2004–2006	Redditch United	75	(4)
2006–2007	Mansfield Town	8	(0)
2007–2008	AFC Telford United	33	(3)
2008	→ Shifnal Town (loan)	2	(0)
2008	→ Stourbridge (loan)	2	(0)
2008	→ Hednesford Town (loan)		
2008–2010	Redditch United	3	(0)
2010–2011	Corby Town	17	(0)
2011	Worcester City	21	(2)
2011–2012	Leamington	24	(2)
2012–2013	Redditch United		
2013	Hinckley United	10	(0)
2015–2016	Willenhall Town		
2016–2018	Halesowen Town	53	(3)
2018–2020	Rushall Olympic		
2020–2022	Redditch United		
2022	Sutton Coldfield Town	1	(0)
2022–2023	Halesowen Town	0	(0)
2023	Shifnal Town	22	(1)
2023	Walsall Wood	3	(1)
2023	AFC Wulfrunians	11	(2)
2023–	Walsall Wood	24	(1)
- * Club domestic league appearances and goals as of 20:59, 20 April 2024 (UTC)

Asa Edmund Charlton (born 7 December 1977) is an English footballer who plays as a defender for Walsall Wood.

== Playing career ==
A trainee at Kidderminster Harriers, Charlton failed to make the grade at Aggborough and joined local side Willenhall Town. His form soon attracted the attentions of bigger clubs in non-league football, with the youngster joining Telford United before the start of the 1997–98 season. He made only a handful of appearances at the Buck's Head, before leaving at the end of the season to move to the US, where he took a break from football to study computer science at the Coastal Carolina University under a football scholarship.

After a year in the States, he returned to the UK, continuing his computer science studies at the University of Wolverhampton. He continued to play football, turning out for the British Universities team for a spell. He returned to the non-league ranks with short spells at Rushall Olympic and Stourport Swifts, before signing for Southern League Premier Division side Worcester City on the eve of the 2002–2003 season.

Used mainly as a substitute, Charlton made only four starts at St. Georges Lane, before joining fellow Southern League side Halesowen Town in January 2003. His stay with the Yeltz was to be the longest of his career to date, as he became a popular figure at the Grove. He was named club captain the following season after their relegation to Southern League West, but fell out of favour at the start of the 2004–2005 season, and moved to newly promoted Conference North side Redditch United. He enjoyed two years of success at the Valley, making seventy appearances for United as they established themselves at step two in English non-league football.

His form for Redditch had caught the eye of a number of clubs, but it was a surprise to all when it emerged that at 29 years old, Charlton was to be given his first chance of professional football at League Two Mansfield Town. He signed for the Stags in November 2006, but made only a handful of appearances as they only just avoided relegation to non-league football.

Released at the end of the season, he moved back to the Bucks Head, to join newly promoted AFC Telford United. He became a popular figure in the 2007–08 season, as the Bucks immediately settled into their new surroundings of Conference North. He started the 2008–09 season suspended, and put himself further down the pecking order when he injured himself after dropping a beer barrel on his foot. After recovering, he was sent out on loan to local sides Shifnal Town and Stourbridge to gain match practice.

The left-back left the Conference North side Redditch United in 2010 and signed with Corby Town.

His next move was to re-join former club Worcester City. This was followed by a switch to Leamington in October 2011 where he made his debut on 4 October against Chippenham Town.

=== Hinckley United ===
In June 2013, it was announced that Charlton had joined Hinckley United ahead of the 2013–14 Southern Football League season, under the new management of Stuart Storer and Andy Penny.

=== Return to Halesowen ===
Charlton returned to former team Halesowen Town for the 2013–14 Northern Premier League season and extended his contract for the 2017–18 Northern Premier League season.

=== Rushall Olympic ===
Following on from his release by Halesowen Town, Charlton joined Southern League Premier Central rivals Rushall Olympic on 28 December 2018.

In August 2022, Charlton returned to Halesowen Town as an ambassador of the club where he would still be training with the first-team as well as supporting the owners off the field.

In June 2023, Charlton joined AFC Wulfrunians. He joined Walsall Wood in October 2023.
