= Albrighton, east Shropshire =

Village in Shropshire, England

Coordinates: 52°38′07″N 2°16′42″W

Albrighton
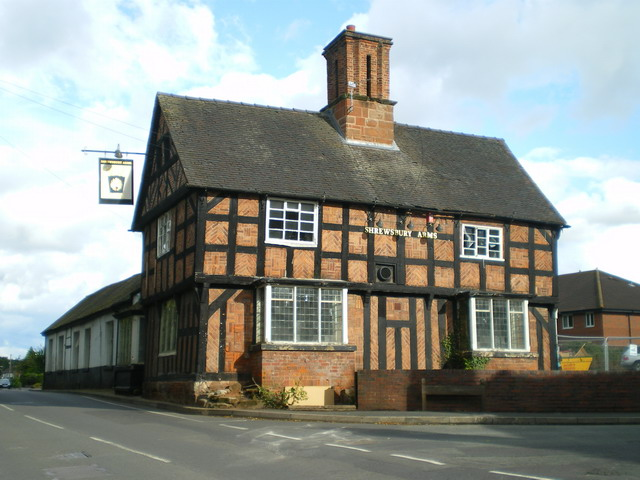
- The Shrewsbury Arms

- Location within Shropshire
- Population: 4,326 (2011)
- OS grid reference: SJ812041
- Civil parish: Albrighton and Donington
- Unitary authority: Shropshire
- Ceremonial county: Shropshire
- Region: West Midlands
- Country: England
- Sovereign state: United Kingdom
- Post town: Wolverhampton
- Postcode district: WV7
- Dialling code: 01902
- Police: West Mercia
- Fire: Shropshire
- Ambulance: West Midlands
- UK Parliament: The Wrekin

Albrighton is a large village in the civil parish of Albrighton and Donington, in Shropshire, England, 8 miles (13 km) northwest of Wolverhampton and 11 miles (18 km) northeast of Bridgnorth. In 2021 the parish of Albrighton had a population of 4444.

The village has a railway station on the Shrewsbury to Wolverhampton Line, and is near to RAF Cosford and the M54 motorway. It is the most easterly settlement in Shropshire. Immediately to the north is the hamlet and parish of Donington, which is separated from Albrighton by Humphreston Brook.

== History ==
Mentioned in the Domesday Book of 1086 as Albricston(e) or the home/farm of Albric/Aethelbeorht, it received its charter granting Borough status in 1303, which was renewed in 1662 for rather unusual reasons. The charter declared that "because Albrighton (then) adjoined Staffordshire on the east, south and west sides, felons and other malefactors fled Staffordshire to escape prosecution because there was no resident justice of the peace in that part of Shropshire" and on account of its remoteness from Shrewsbury, Shropshire's county town. The Borough status meant that there was a Justice of the Peace who could order the arrest of criminals. After the charter's renewal in 1662 it seemed to lapse again by the 19th century. A Mace confirming its borough status was discovered for auction at Sotheby's and this was purchased for £359 in 1948. The money was raised by local subscription under the guidance and perseverance of the Rev E E Wright.

A small jail and stocks stood somewhere near to the Crown public house, whilst a room above it was used for various village meetings and transactions. There was also a Toll House nearby. A press article in 1884 discussing the history of the village's regular fairs stated that they were 'held on a wide open space called the Cross, where the cross roads are in the middle of the [village]. The Market Hall stood in the midst of the space, with the lock-up under it, and the stocks and pinfold close by. Rev Blakeway in his draft History of Albrighton (c.1810-1814) mentioned that the Market House 'stands in the middle of the [village] and has two arches'. It is not known when the Toll Shop/House and Market Hall/House were demolished. The Rev Wright thought the buildings were more likely to be on the area of the village green but none of the early tithe maps show these buildings.

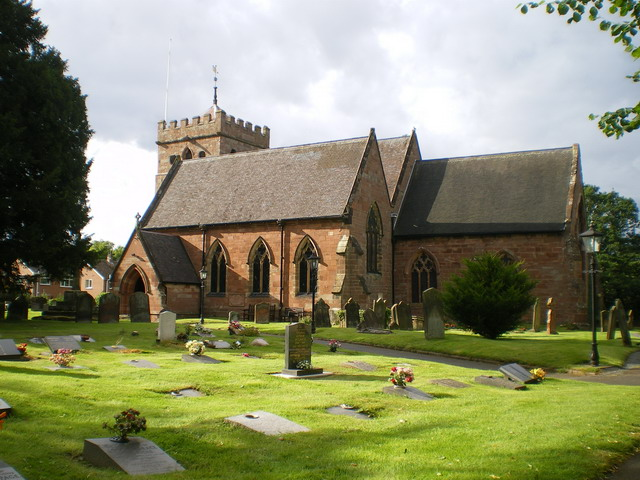
The church of St Mary Magdalene, Albrighton

The parish church, dedicated to St Mary Magdalene was completed around 1181, and some rebuilding work was done in 1853. It is built of red sandstone in the Norman style. The church contains an alabaster monument to Sir John Talbot (died 1555) and his wife Lady Frances Gifford, as well as the Albrighton Mace, which was donated to the village in 1663, by Lady Mary Talbot. The east window of the church dates from the 14th century. The church also contains the family tomb of the Talbot Family, including the final resting place of Charles Talbot, the only Duke of Shrewsbury, George Talbot, 9th Earl of Shrewsbury (a Catholic priest), and Francis Talbot, 11th Earl of Shrewsbury, among others. The church is separated from the extremely close parish church of St Cuthbert (Donington) by Humphreston Brook. The story is that two sisters disagreed about the nature of the architecture of the church, and so resolved to build their own churches right next to each other. St Cuthbert's Church is also very close to St Cuthbert's Well, a holy well and grade II listed building that is located within Donington and Albrighton Nature Reserve.

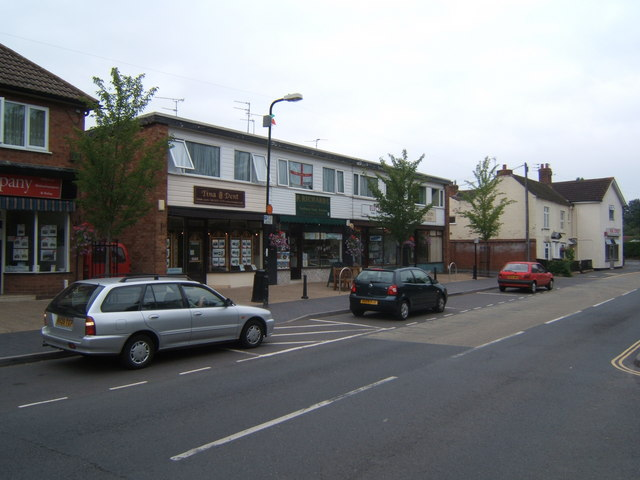
Shops on Albrighton High St

Humphreston Brook (Note: Whilst historically, the references point to this watercourse being called Humphreston Brook, more modern references label it as Albrighton Brook. The BBC referred to Albrighton Brook in its flooding in Albrighton report of 2006 and Severn Trent Water refer to the confluence of the brook at Cosford Bridge into the River Worfe as Albrighton Brook. It also lists the brook as starting at grid ref SJ803 047, which is just after the brook passes under Newport Road by the Fire Station) was dammed by a local miller in the 17th century. It now provides the boundary between the two parishes and feeds into Donington Pool, which is also part of the Donington and Albrighton Nature Reserve. Rev. Blakeway's history refers to the pond as being called Hall Pool, as it was adjacent to Hall Orchard, which was a burial ground for Roman Catholics by the church of St Mary Magdalene.

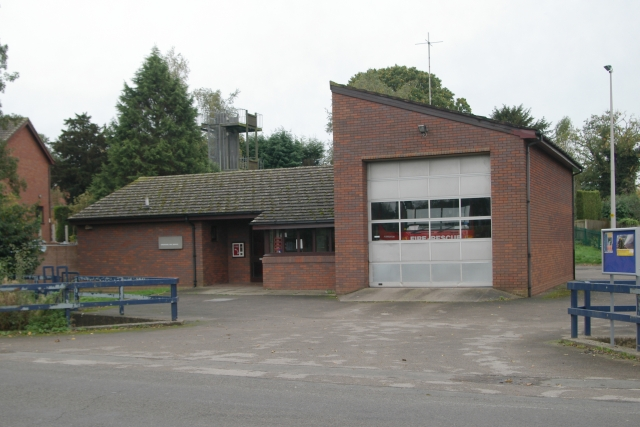
Albrighton fire station

For most of the 14th century and into the 15th the manor of Albrighton, together with Ryton, was held by the Carles, Careles or Careless family. The Carles were connected by marriage to the Lestranges (Lords Strange of Blackmere) and the Talbots. Albrighton left the control of this family with the marriage of an heiress to a member of the Corbet family in the reign of Henry VI. The Earl of Shrewsbury is the premier Earl of England and, until 1918, was the biggest land owner in Albrighton. They were originally the Talbot family (later Chetwynd-Talbot), many of whom are buried in Albrighton Church.

Early in the 17th century, Albrighton was noted for making buttons and then in the 18th century clock making flourished. By 1880 it was bricks, but by and large, agriculture was the main industry before the building of the railways.

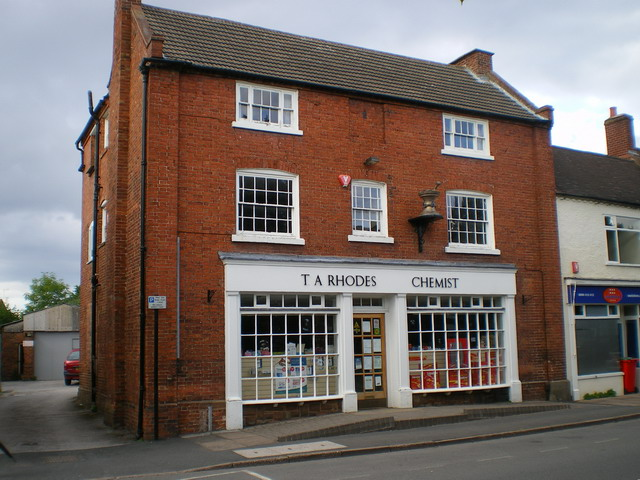
T A Rhodes the chemist in Albrighton

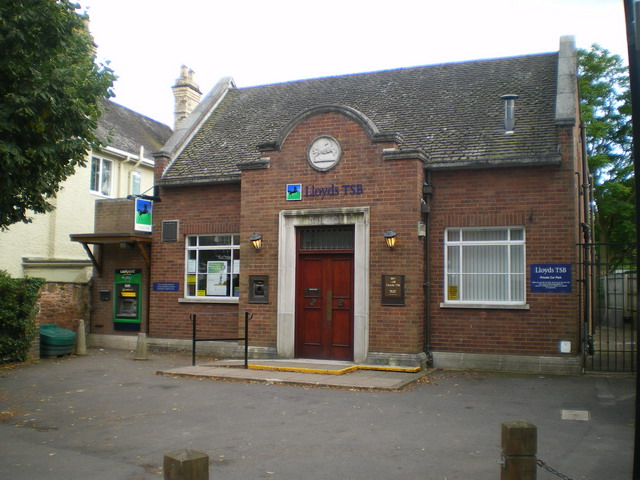
Lloyds-TSB Bank in Albrighton

The population of Albrighton in 1801 was 900. In 1901 it was 1,200 and was still only 1,230 by 1931. Today it is over 4,000.

The High Street has not been altered too much over the years. The half timbered inns, Georgian facades and lime trees still make the street picturesque. Some sources say the lime trees were planted in the 19th century by a Dr Orson Bidwell; others say a former Earl of Shrewsbury was responsible. In all probability, both of them planted trees and so may many other people if a tree was damaged or failed. The diary of John Howell, tenant farmer of Beamish and House Farm, gives the year of planting as 1832.

Gas came to Albrighton in 1868 and the Gasometer was at the side of the railway goods yard. The Cosford Waterworks were established in 1857 and water was first supplied to the village in 1895. Electricity came in 1919 initially on overhead poles and later, during the 1950s, the cables were put underground.

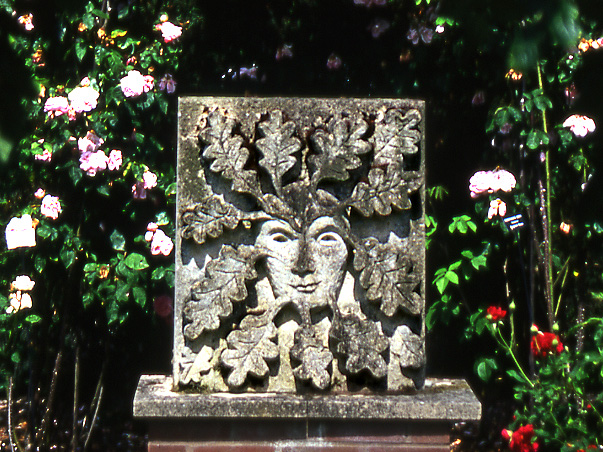
Austin Rose Garden Green Man

In 1967, the A41 road through the village was bypassed and it now curves around the northern part of the village.

The village green was much more important in the first half of 20th century. At the time of the First World War there were swings on it, political meetings were held there, an evangelist lady spent three days a year in a caravan giving out leaflets and talking to people, also a band gave concerts there.

In 1969, David C.H. Austin opened up the David Austin Plant Centre on the western edge of the village bordering the A464 road. David Austin Roses are renowned the world over for their roses and the site is open to the public providing a large tourist attraction in the village.

In 1998, the village granted the Officers and Men of RAF Cosford the right to exercise through the village. Traditionally, this is known as having the Freedom of a village, town or city, but because Albrighton is not a borough, true freedom status could not be granted. However, every two years, staff from RAF Cosford parade down the High Street.

== Governance ==
An electoral ward of Shropshire Council in the name of Albrighton exists. This ward includes the parish of Donington and at the 2011 census had a total population of 4,628. Its councillor in 2012 was Malcolm Pate, who was a member of the Conservative Party.

On 1 April 2025 the civil parish was abolished and merged with Boscobel and Donington to form "Albrighton and Donington".

== Trivia ==
In about 1840, while writing the book The Old Curiosity Shop, Charles Dickens wrote about Tong Church whilst staying at the Public House now known as The Harp.

In July 1992 Anneka Rice and the Challenge Anneka series came to Albrighton and created a fishing pool for disabled people, known as the Albrighton Moat Project. She returned in July 2017 to celebrate 25 years of the project.

In the summer of 2006, a storm broke out in Albrighton and parts of the village were flooded badly.

== Education ==
Albrighton has five educational establishments: Albrighton and Donington Nursery, St Mary's Church of England Primary School, Albrighton Primary School (formerly Albrighton Infant and Junior School), Birchfield School and St Mary's Nursery Group.

== Transport ==
Route	Destination	Operator	Notes
891	Telford & Wolverhampton	Banga Buses	Every Hour Mon-Fri, Every 2 hours Sat, No service on Sundays and Bank Holidays

== Amenities ==
The village has four pubs:

- The Crown, Albrighton
- The Old Bush, Albrighton
- The Shrewsbury Arms, Albrighton (originally named as the Talbot Inn)
- The Harp

Social clubs include:

- Albrighton Sports and Social Club (Closed for development on 18 November 2020)
- Albrighton and District Rotary Club
- Albrighton Cricket Club
- Albrighton Tennis Club
- Royal British Legion
- Albrighton Bowling Club
- Albrighton Football Club

The Red House in Albrighton, run by a trust, has, of 2021, been a venue for community activities for over 50 years. It was awarded the Queen's Award for Voluntary Service for its volunteers' support of the community during the COVID pandemic, by converting the parish minibus into a mobile shop to provide food and other deliveries, and for 6 months had run a Community Support Group.

== Notable people ==
- David C. H. Austin OBE VMH (1926–2018), horticulturalist, was born in Albrighton, died there and is buried at St Mary Magdalene's church.
- Jason Watkins (born 1962), actor, was also born in Albrighton where he lived until age seven. His mother was teacher at the local Primary School. He is best known for his role as DS Dodds in the ITV crime drama, McDonald and Dodds.

== Right of Approbation ==
The following people and military units have received the "Right of Approbation" of Albrighton. This is the Village Council's equivalent to the granting of the Freedom of the City. Villages in the United Kingdom are not legally allowed to award the "Freedom of the Village" according to the wording of the Local Democracy, Economic Development and Construction Act 2009.

=== Military Units ===
- RAF Cosford: 1998.

== See also ==
- Listed buildings in Albrighton, Bridgnorth
