= Brewood =

Town and civil parish in Staffordshire, England

Coordinates: 52°40′38″N 2°10′18″W

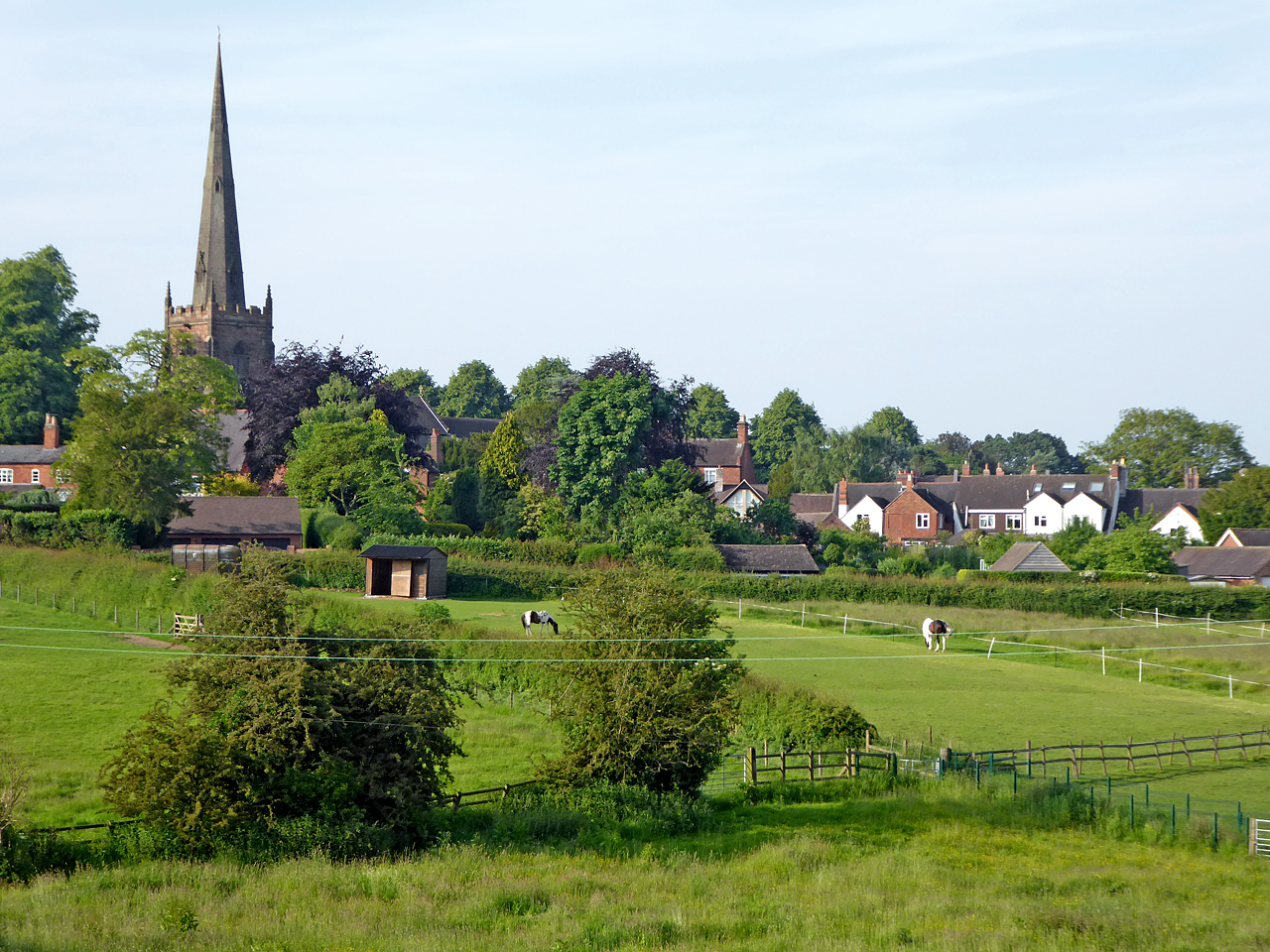
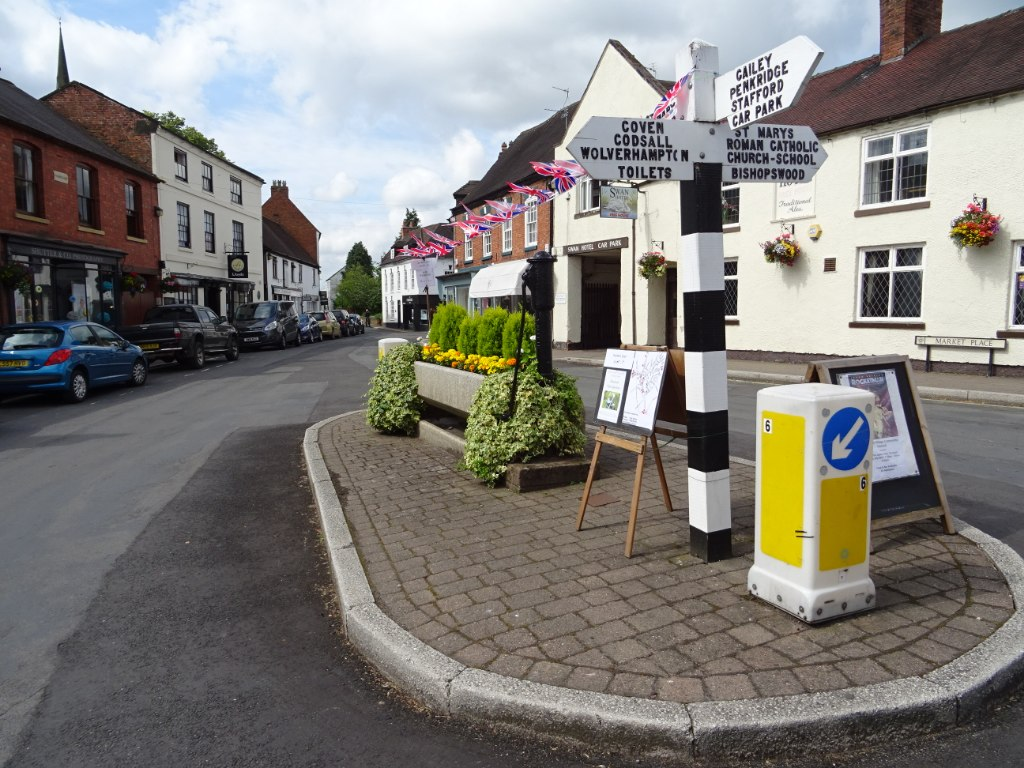
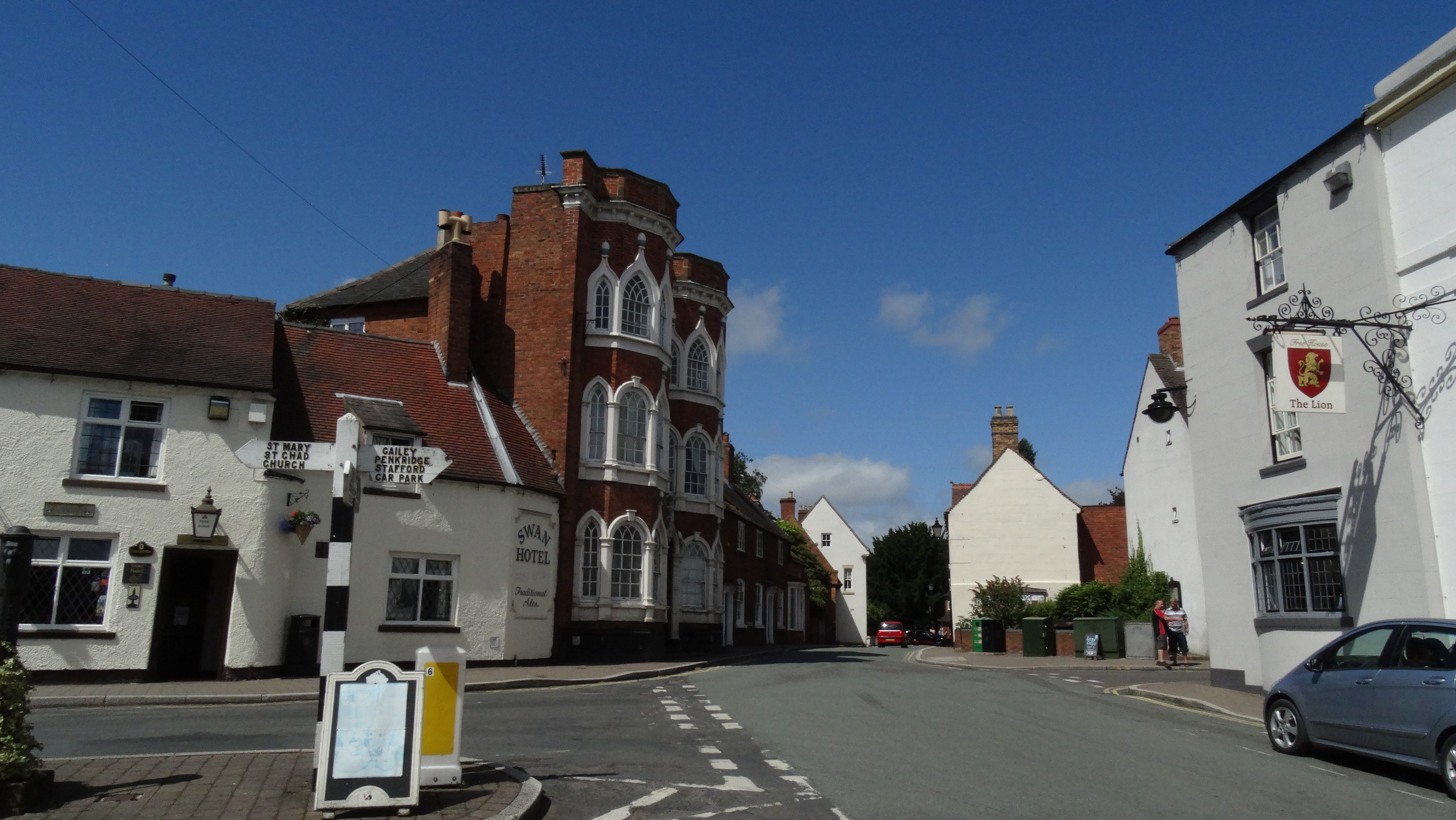
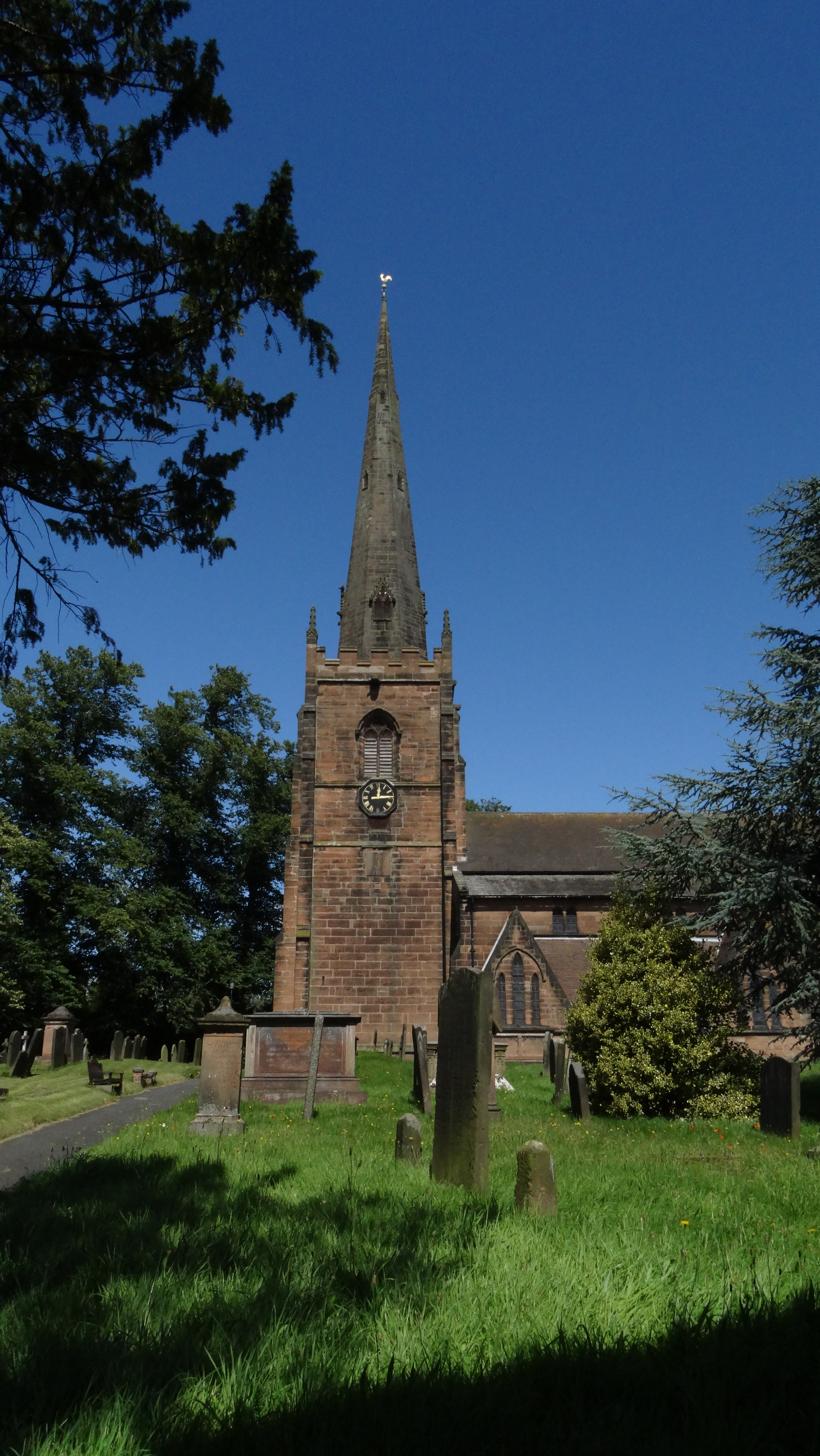
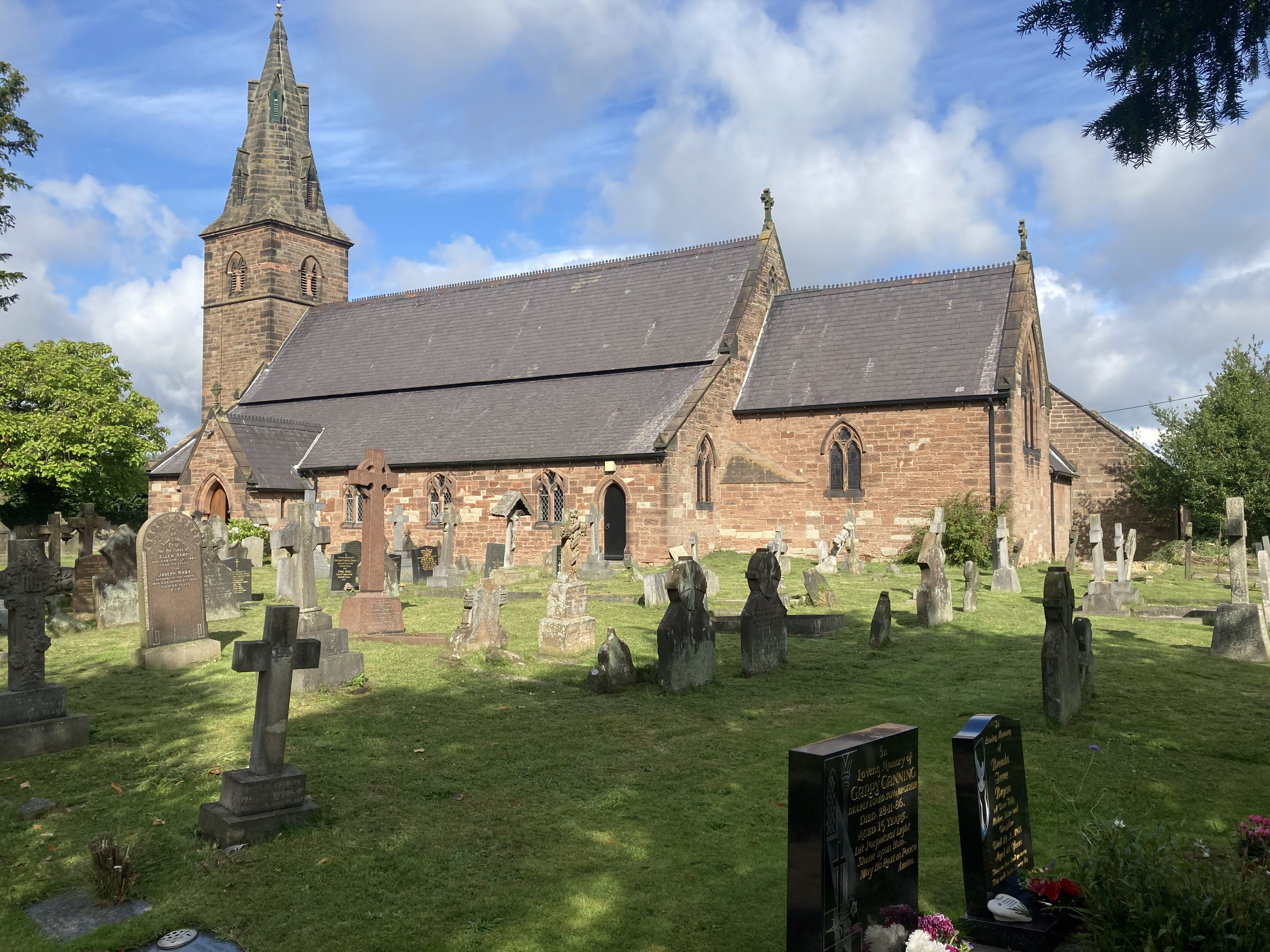
- Clockwise from top: Brewood skyline, Market Place, Speedwell Castle (a house), St Mary and St Chad Church and St Mary's Church

- Location within Staffordshire
- Population: 7,329 (2011)
- OS grid reference: SJ883088
- Civil parish: Brewood and Coven
- District: South Staffordshire
- Shire county: Staffordshire
- Region: West Midlands
- Country: England
- Sovereign state: United Kingdom
- Post town: STAFFORD
- Postcode district: ST19
- Dialling code: 01902
- Police: Staffordshire
- Fire: Staffordshire
- Ambulance: West Midlands
- UK Parliament: Stone, Great Wyrley and Penkridge

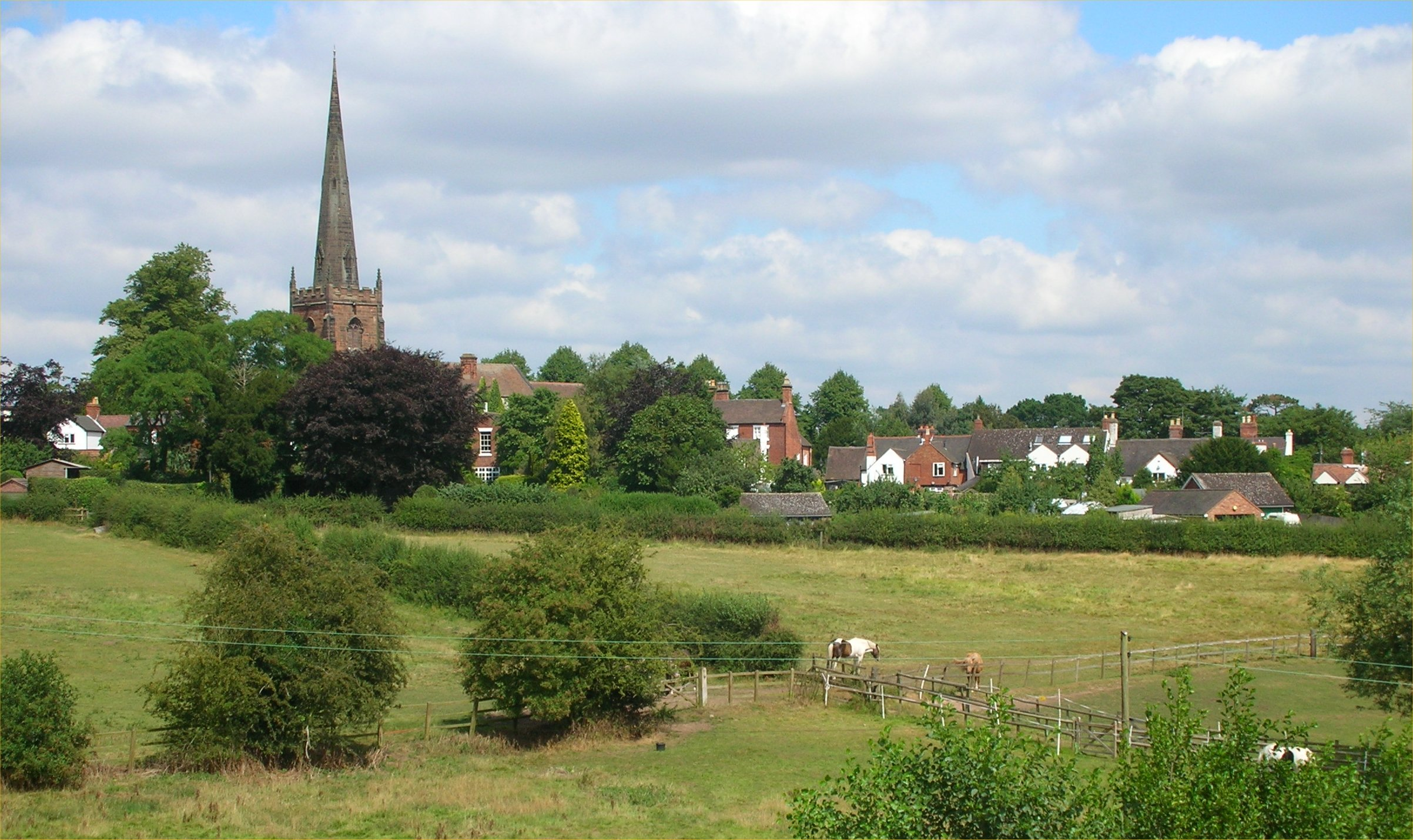
Skyline of Brewood from the Shropshire Union canal

Brewood /ˈbruːd/ is an ancient market town in the civil parish of Brewood and Coven, in the South Staffordshire district, in the county of Staffordshire, England. Brewood lies near the River Penk, 8 miles (13 km) north of Wolverhampton and 11 miles (18 km) south of Stafford. Brewood is about 3 miles (4.8 km) east of the county border with Shropshire.

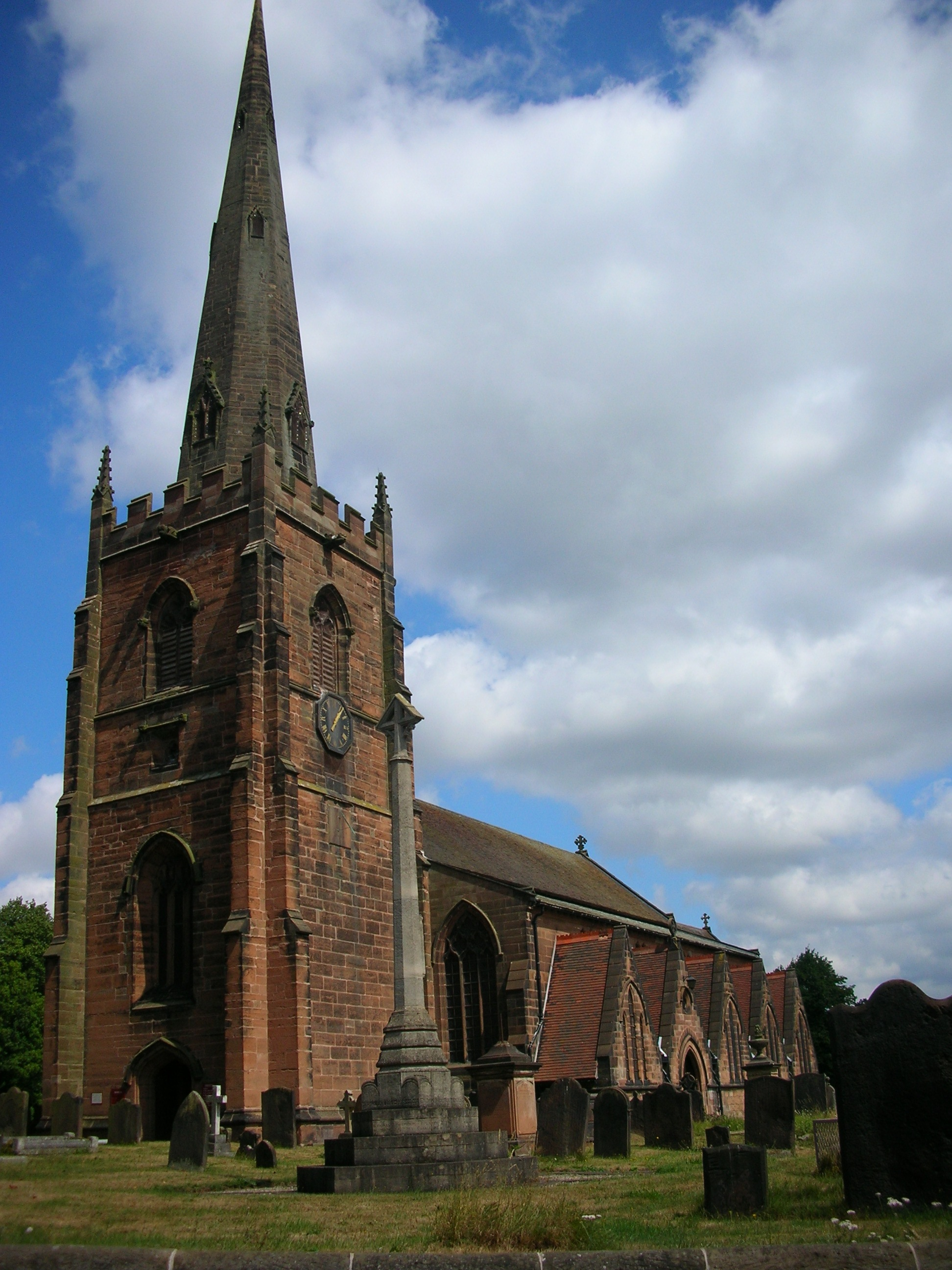
Church of England church of St Mary & St Chad, Brewood. The principal church.

== Etymology ==
The Domesday Book of 1086 documented the town as 'Breude'. The name is probably a compound made up of a Celtic, Brythonic word, and an Anglo Saxon, Old English word.

The first element is the British word 'briga', which appears in modern Welsh as 'bre'. This is the most common of a number of Celtic place-name elements that signify a hill. It appears in various combinations, but sometimes on its own (as in Bray). Margaret Gelling, a specialist in West Midland toponyms, suggested that it was often misunderstood by the Anglo-Saxons as a name rather than as a common noun. Therefore, Anglo-Saxons would have thought that they had come upon a place that was called, by the natives, Brig or Bre, rather than this simply meaning "a hill". This is why the word is often combined tautologically (as in Bredon Hill, where all three elements have the same meaning).

The second element is probably obvious: the Anglo-Saxon 'wudu', which sign a wood. Hence, the name Brewood means either "Wood on or by a hill" or "Wood near a place called Bre".

== History ==
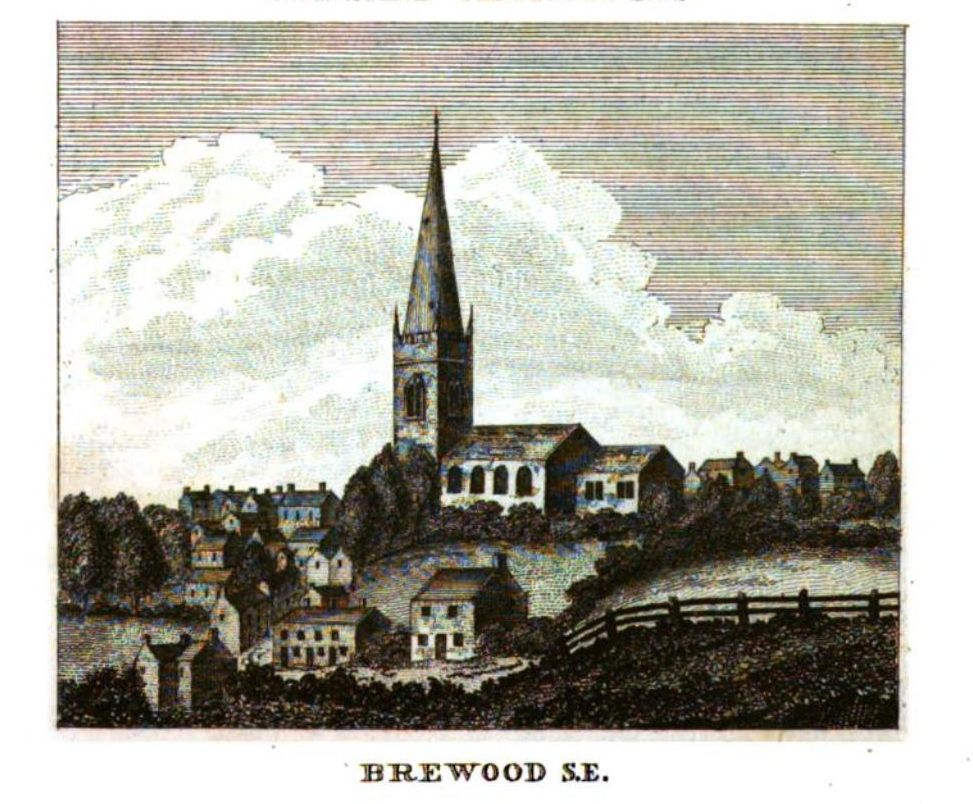
Brewood Church

=== Origins ===
The old Roman road, Watling Street, stretching from Londinium across the Roman Province of Britannia Superior to Wroxeter and later Chester, runs one mile to the north of the village as the A5. There were small Roman stations along this route and the most important settlement locally was Pennocrucium, which had an outlying fort. The name Pennocrucium is clearly associated with Penkridge, the town and parish north of Brewood, which is separated from it by the line of Watling Street, and these important remains do lie just outside the parish boundary. However, the remains of a small Roman villa have been found about 500m south of Watling Street, close to Engleton, and so within Brewood parish. Clearly there was a small population in the Brewood area in Roman times, and quite possibly earlier. However, there is no evidence of continuity at any of the main settlements in present-day Brewood. The history of Brewood really begins with the Anglo-Saxon settlement, when it emerged as a village within Mercia. The place name suggests that it came into existence during the earlier part of the Anglo-Saxon period, when there were still people in the area of Celtic language and culture. However, the first real documentation comes after the Norman Conquest of England.

In the Domesday Book of 1086, Brewood fell within the Cuttlestone Hundred of Staffordshire. The survey records that it was held by the Bishop of Chester and that it had been a church property before 1066. However, the landholder of the manor of Brewood in the Middle Ages is generally stated to be the Diocese of Lichfield. This is not a contradiction, but reflects the shifts in the seat of the diocese. In 1075, Peter, bishop of Lichfield, had transferred his see to Chester, and there it remained until 1102, when it moved to Coventry. From 1228, the official title was the Diocese of Coventry and Lichfield.

Brewood was assessed for tax purposes as 5 hides, the hide being notionally an area of 120 acres, although at this time it had become simply a unit of tax liability, irrespective of actual area. Domesday also records Brewood as consisting of enough land for 20 ploughs. The bishop had twenty slaves cultivating his land in the village. The rest of the population consisted of 24 villagers, 18 smallholders and a priest. There were two mills, presumably on the River Penk. There was also a substantial area of woodland, tending to confirm the accepted etymology. However Domesday records that the value of the village was £10 in 1066, and had halved in the twenty years since. Hence we can be sure that it had prospered in the late Anglo-Saxon period but had suffered a check to its growth during, and perhaps because of, Norman rule.

=== The development of Brewood ===
Norman rule brought Forest Law to the area, and it was not until 1204, in the reign of King John, that Brewood Forest was abolished. A forest was a royal hunting reserve, which meant that it was not necessarily wooded. The area of the parish to the east of the Penk was not part of Brewood Forest, but it belonged to the Forest of Cank or Cannock Chase. It was not deforested until about a century later.

==== Brewood market ====
In 1221, a charter for a Friday market at Brewood was granted to the Bishop of Coventry and Lichfield by King Henry III, suggesting considerable growth and increased prosperity since the Domesday survey. However, the charter was valid only until the seniority of the king, who was a child at the time. The market continued, nevertheless, and the king recognised a Monday market too, in 1259, as well as granting the right to hold an annual fair over the feast of the Nativity of Mary, on 7–9 September, although it was transferred to 19 September after the adoption of the Gregorian Calendar in the 18th century. In 1382, the burgesses of Stafford tried to get Brewood's markets suppressed, claiming that they had been unlicensed for twenty years and injured their trade. However, Stafford lost to Brewood and both market and fair were confirmed some time around 1390, in the reign of Richard II. The market petered out during the 18th century, and competition from Wolverhampton killed off an attempted revival in the following century. Although a general fair, the most important trade at the annual event was in horses. It continued until after World War I.

Around the same time that the market was established, building of the large sandstone church of St Mary and St Chad was commenced, probably replacing a less impressive earlier church. It has undergone numerous alterations and restorations, but it was clearly a large and impressive structure from the outset. Around 1176, the bishop had conferred the church on the deanery of Lichfield Cathedral. The deans kept advowson, the right to nominate the priest until 1868. In medieval England, the local priest, in this case titled the vicar from 1275, was not a salaried official but a feudatory, dependent on a benefice designed to support him in office and owing service to his patron, the dean, in return. The vicar was to receive the altar dues and various other revenues, including mortuary dues and tithes on wool – with the notable exception of wool from the dean's flock, of course. In return, he was to pay the dean a pension of 10 marks.

The most notable of the medieval vicars was William de Pecco, who showed a shrewd eye for economic advantage. He somehow persuaded the nuns of Blackladies to let him impose a tithe on sheep and lambs that belonged to other people but were kept on their land – a long-standing matter of dispute between the parish and the nunnery. He also exchanged parcels of land with John de Horsbrok to rationalise the vicarage lands, and arranged to pay John and his successors the small annual rent of 3d. to site the vicarage bakehouse on his land. Apparently the financial position of the vicars fluctuated wildly. The vicarage was supposed to be worth £6 17s. 8d. in 1535, but in 1604 the vicar received an income of about 100 marks, despite the fact that he was described as "no preacher, a notable swearer and drunkard". In 1646, after the first round of the English Civil War the living was valued at a mere £20 and the vicar was bailed out by Parliament's Committee for Plundered Ministers, which gave him £50 from the sequestered estates of the dean and £8 from those of John and Peter Giffard at White Ladies and Blackladies. In the early 18th century the vicarage needed another subvention, this time from Queen Anne's Bounty, a fund designed to aid the poorest Anglican clergy.

==== Religious communities ====
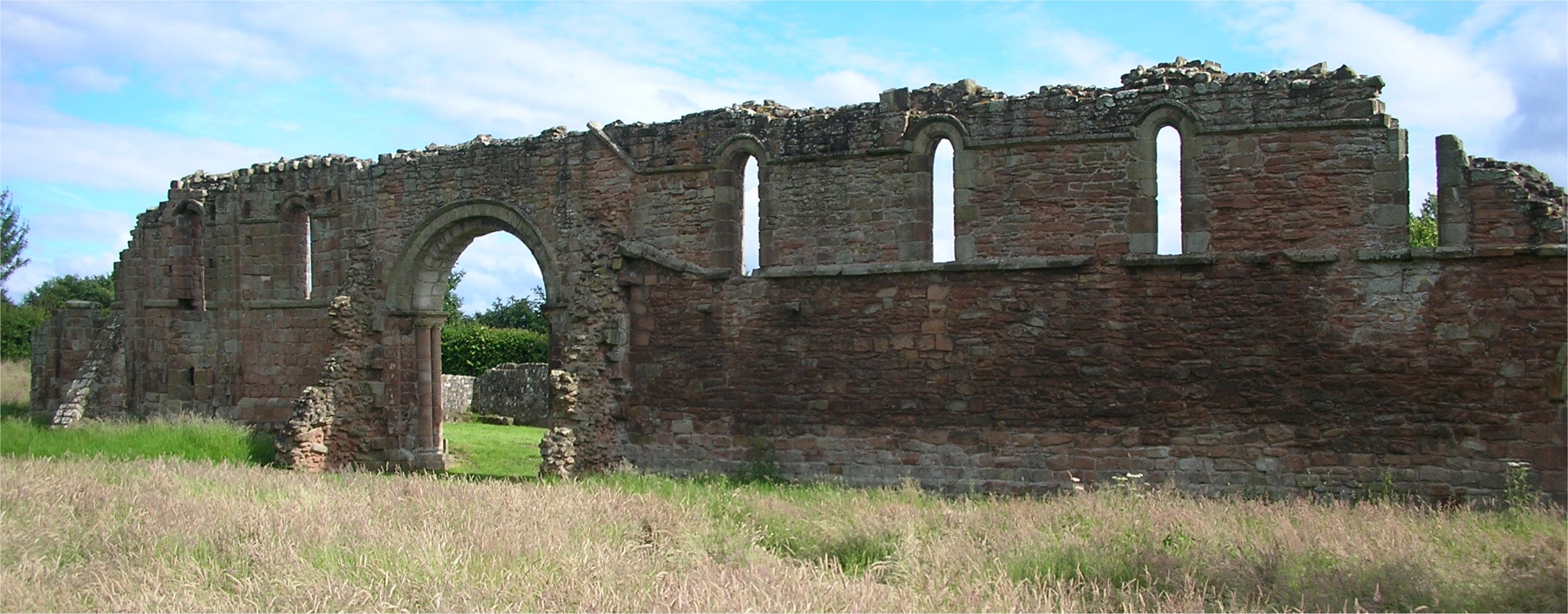
Ruins of White Ladies Priory, viewed from the north-east

From the mid-12th century, two religious communities of women developed in the Brewood area: the Benedictine priory of St Mary, Brewood, which was generally known as "Blackladies"; and the Augustinian priory of St Leonard, Brewood, which was generally known as White Ladies Priory or "Whiteladies". Both priories were suppressed in the first wave of the dissolution of the monasteries (under Henry VIII), and their buildings and local estates ended up in the hands of the Giffard family.

==== The Leper Well ====
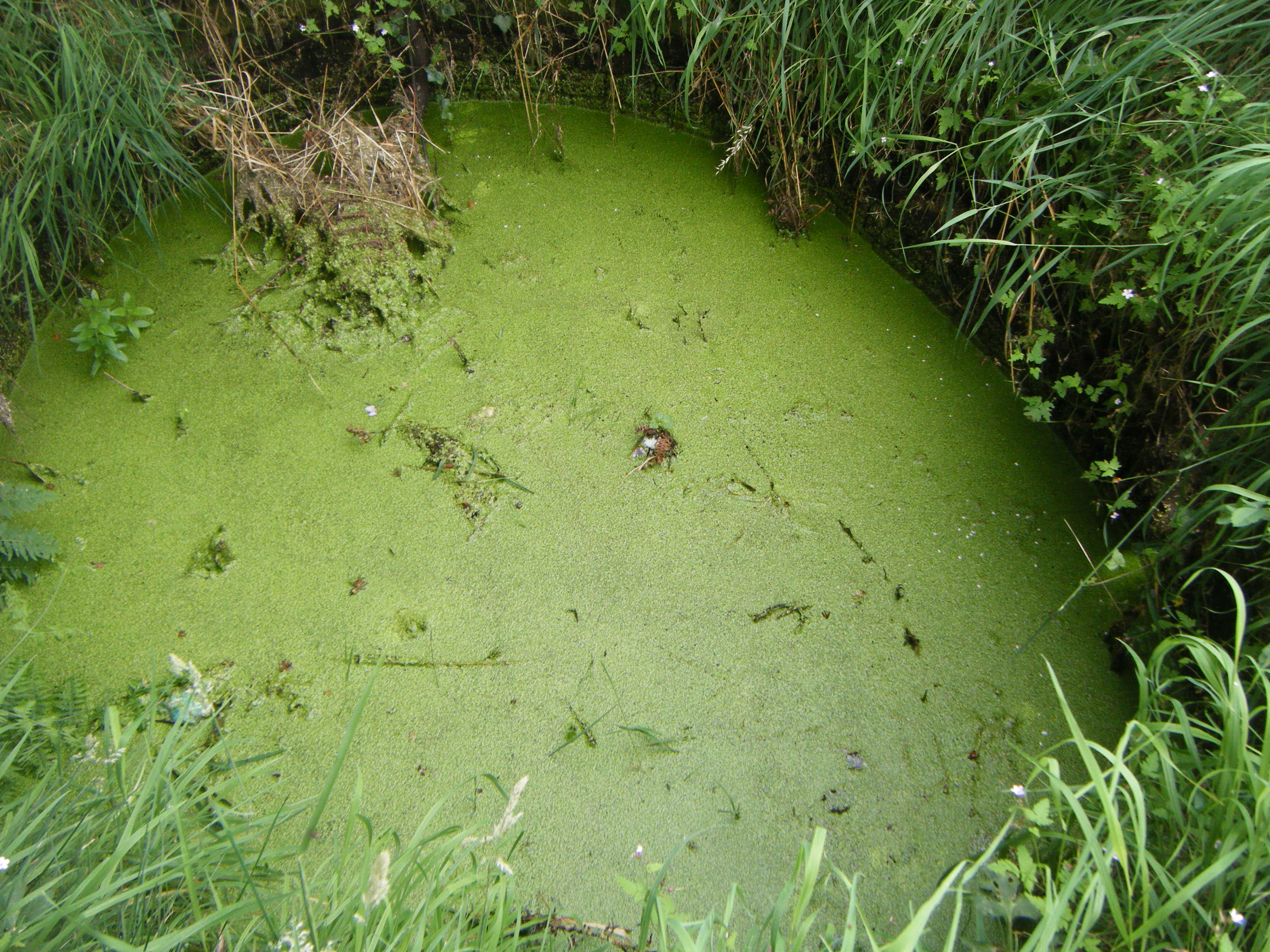
The Leper Well, Gunstone

Unusually, there were two recorded sulphur wells at Chillington and Gunstone. The latter seems to have had a leper house: there is a farm with this name today at Gunstone, and there is a sulphurous leper well nearby. Sulphurous water was a medieval, actually ineffective, remedy for leprosy. Leprosy or Hansen's disease was common in medieval Europe and seems to have reached a peak between the mid-12th and mid-14th centuries. The Third Lateran Council decreed segregation for lepers in special leper houses. These were generally under monastic supervision. Leprosy declined rapidly until it faded from consciousness after the Black Death, but the waters were still used by people and animals suffering from skin ailments in the late 17th century.

==== Brewood Grammar School ====
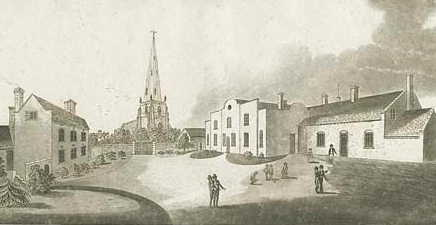
The grammar school pictured in 1799, with the parish church in the background.

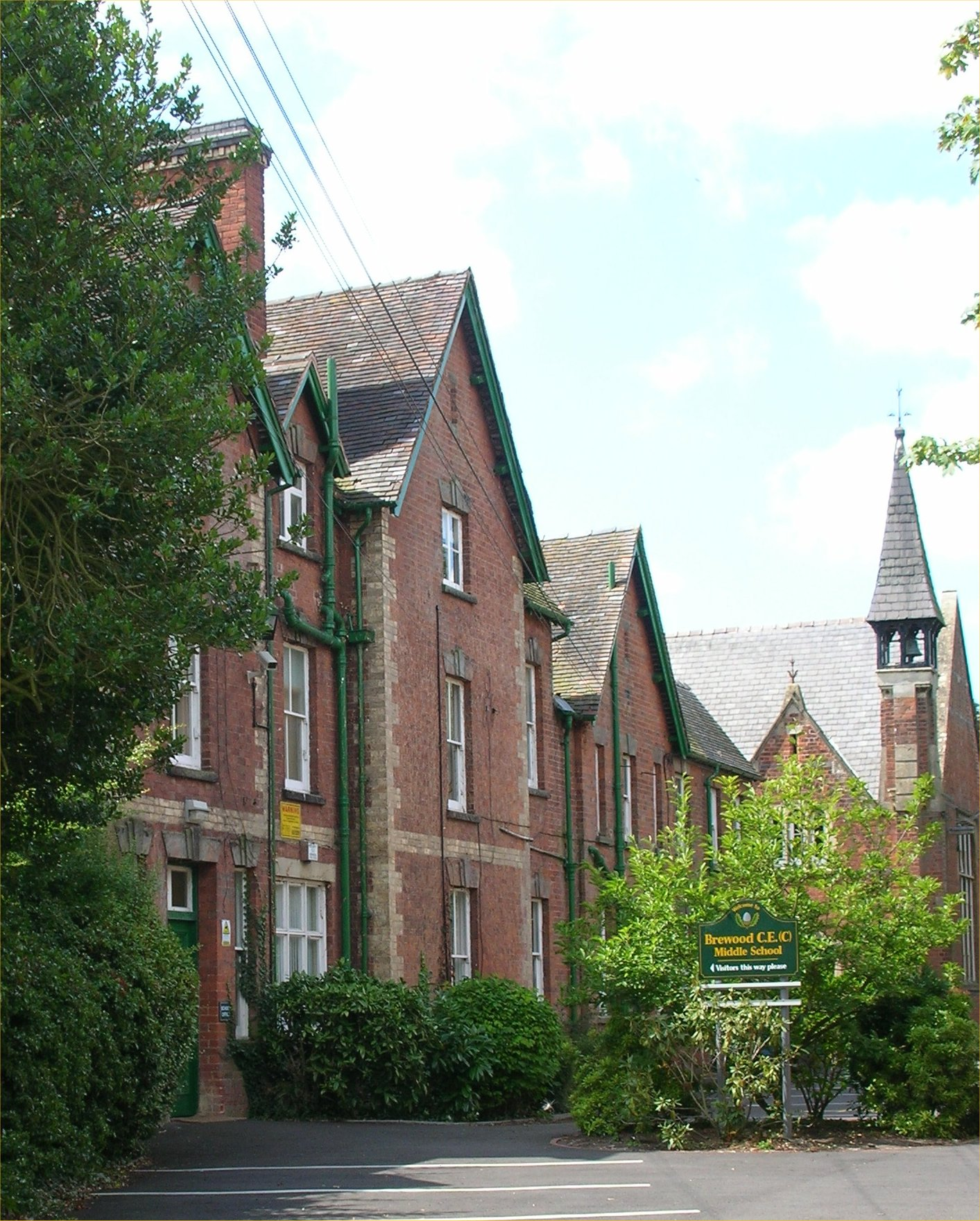
The grammar school building, now incorporated into the Church of England Middle School, in School Road. Most of the building dates from a reconstruction of 1856.

Brewood Grammar School was founded in the town in the reign of Elizabeth I, replacing a chantry school founded in the previous century and dissolved when all chantries were suppressed in 1547. Richard Hurd, educated at the school by William Budworth in the 1730s, and later to become a Bishop of Worcester, was one of the most notable students.

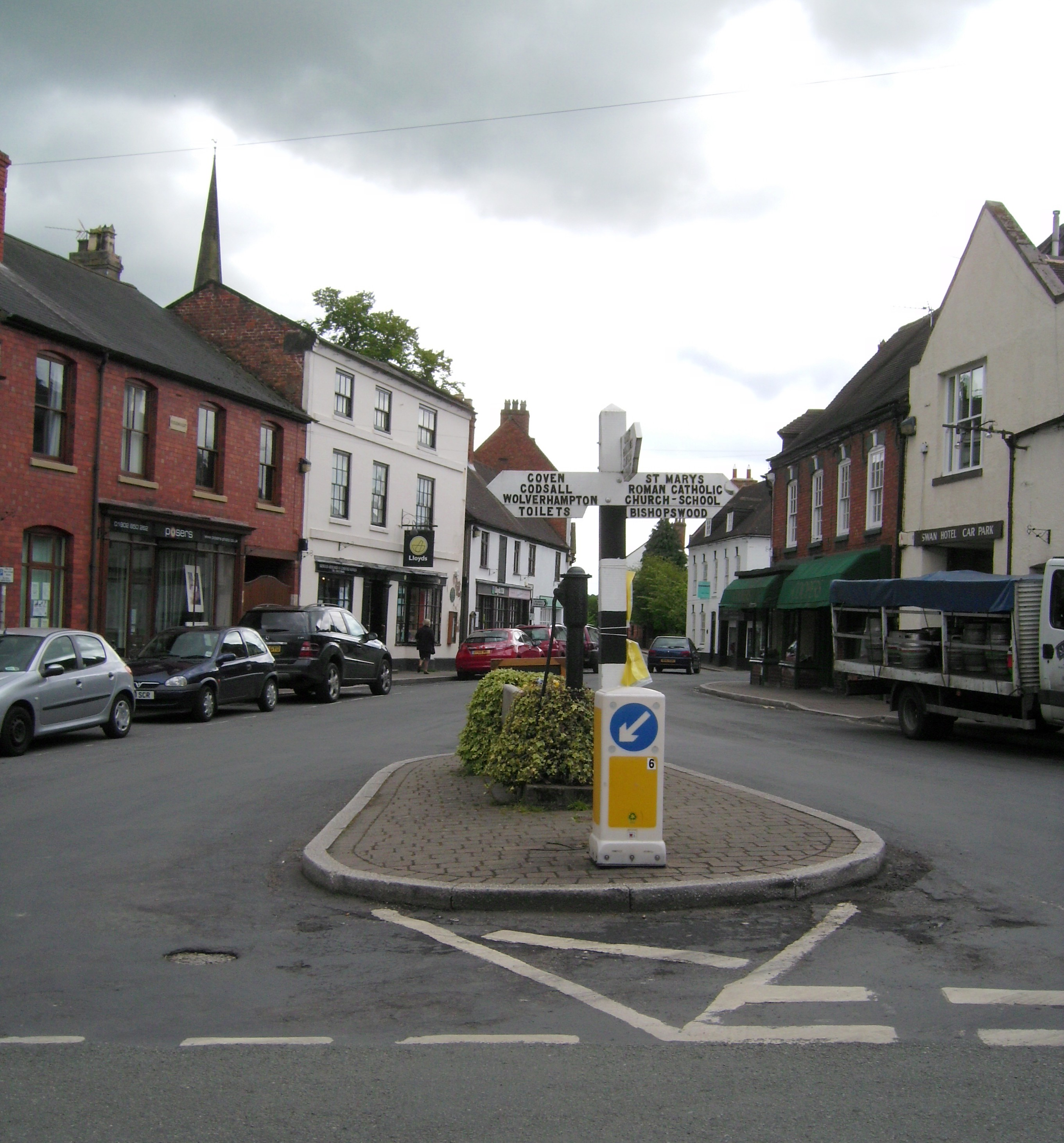
The Market Place in 2011.

The market, the grand church and the grammar school mark out Brewood as a small town, not just a village, by the standards of this period, and it was sometimes referred to as the Borough of Brewood. Around 1680, the township had about 60 houses, but this had grown to 210 houses, with a population of 919 by 1811. In 1834 William White described Brewood as "a small but well-built market town, with several good streets and a spacious market-place." The historic centre consisted of the market place, with Bargate, Newport and Stafford Streets, and Sandy Lane meeting at it. Dean Street, south-east of the church was another important old street. These still contain many houses of considerable age, mostly Georgian, but with many also from the 16th and 17th centuries. They form a large proportion of the many listed buildings in the parish of Brewood and Coven. Speedwell Castle, in Bargate, is a striking eighteenth-century house said to have been built from the proceeds of a bet on a horse.

In the early 19th century the parish consisted of eight liberties or constablewicks: Brewood town, Chillington, Coven, Engleton, Gunstone and the Hattons, Horsebrook, Kiddemore, and Somerford. The liberties outside the township were mainly based on the old medieval manors of the parish, centred on the seats of local landowners of note and influence. The fortunes of these varied considerably over the centuries. By the early 19th century, Coven had grown considerably and was described as "a considerable village" by William White in 1851. Chillington, on the other hand, had been a village of about 30 houses in the 17th century but had declined to a collection of five farms by 1834.

=== The traditional economy ===
Brewood was the centre of an essentially agricultural community throughout the Middle Ages and well into modern times. Under the feudal manorial system, a large proportion of the land was held in return for service. Typically, peasant farmers, some of them unfree serfs and villeins, worked strips of land in open fields, which they held in return for services rendered to the lord – generally including labour service on his land. This was essentially a subsistence system, with any surplus consumed locally by the lord and his entourage, who often travelled regularly between his various estates. Such a system certainly formed part of the medieval economy of Brewood.

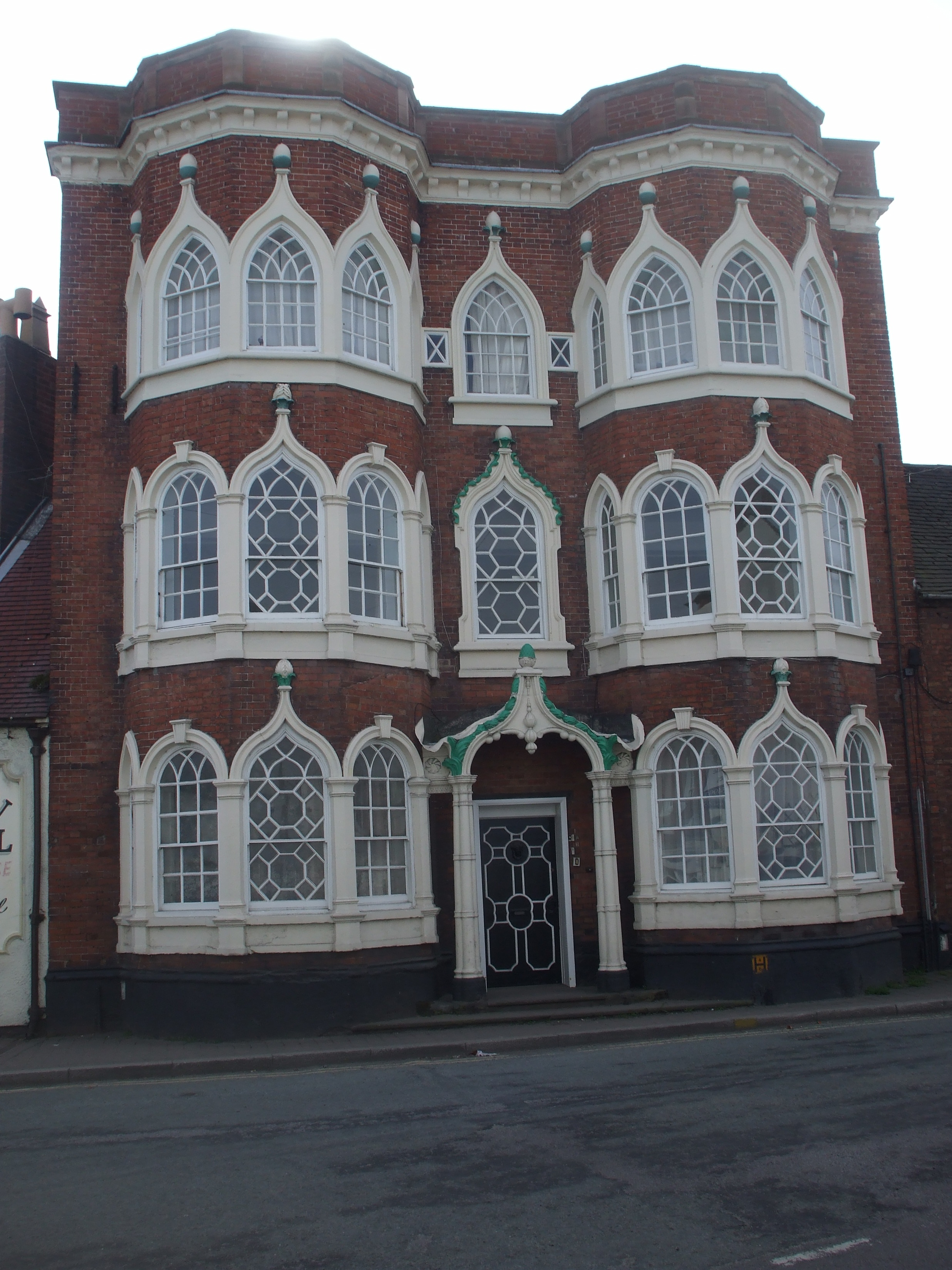
Speedwell Castle

The bishop's land in Brewood was farmed on a three-field system in the 14th century, and probably much earlier. By the late 17th century we find various field throughout the parish subject to piecemeal enclosure. They include Shurgreave Hill Field, Hargreave Field, Eachells (or Nechells) Field and Burgage Field in the manor of Brewood. There were also Quarry Field and Church Field, apparently shared by the bishop's manor and the deanery manor, as well as Cross Field, Mill Field, Street Field, and Butts Field in the vill of Horsebrook, a part of the bishop's manor. In Coven manor we find Broadmeadow Field, Fulmore Field, and 'Rycrofte', all still open fields at the end of the 16th century, although only the first was still farmed in this way by the mid-17th century.

However, there was clearly a good deal of variety in the way the land was let and worked. The bishops leased most of the land to other magnates, who established a number of separate manors and vills throughout the parish, each with its own pattern of exploitation. As early as 1297, lands left by Sir John Giffard in the vills of Chillington and La Hyde included a house and gardens, surrounded by 80 acres under wheat and 40 acres under rye, with 12 acres of woodland and pasture and rents from free and villein tenants. This sounds like large-scale farming for the market by the landowner, as well as subsistence cultivation by the peasants, and the fact that Sir John preferred at least some of his dues in rents suggests that he was using some paid workers instead of inefficient compulsory labour. As time passes we hear more and more of farmers, like the Pendrells and the Careless family, who rented integral areas of various sizes from the landlords to cultivate.

In 1851, William White reported that Brewood parish contained 6718 acres of arable land, 4040 of pasturage, and 1090 of woods, etc.. It is impossible to know how this compares with earlier centuries, but it is likely that the area was always mainly arable, but with a good proportion of pasturage, as this suits the conditions.

Among the most valuable resources in the medieval economy were the watermills, which the lords' tenants were generally compelled to use, either by law or of necessity. The mills were very profitable and the water power on which they depended constituted could become an important point of conflict. The two mills held by the bishop in 1086 were probably those at Engleton and Somerford, and these were certainly the most important and contested mills in the parish for many centuries, although there were a number of others on minor streams. The mills were leased to tenants, sometimes the holder of the surrounding land, but sometimes to an independent speculator. In either case, the miller, usually the butt of peasant complaints and humour, was simply an employee of the lessee. Both owners and lessees guarded the water supply fiercely. In 1318 Ralph de Coven leased Coven mill to John de Aldenham, together with the homage and services of Walron the miller, John, his son. By 1337, the bishop was complaining that John de Aldenham had diverted the Saredon Brook for his own purposes, greatly reducing the capacity of Somerford Mill. Almost three centuries later, in 1623, Francis Somerford, who now operated the same mill, was making a similar complaint: this time a new forge further up the Penk was reducing water power.

Francis Somerford's complaint was not only that the forge stole his water supply, but that it had also flooded the surrounding meadows (presumably by use of a dam or weir), and that his family was disturbed "by the usual knocking thereof at several times of the night", and by "the unwholesome smoke, sparks and air . . . and by the ill neighbourhood of disordered and ill-disposed persons usually employed in and repairing unto such iron-works". This dispels any notion of a rural idyll. Brewood was, in fact, the centre of considerable, and often noisome, industry from an early date. By the 18th century, timber sales and a tannery brought their own particular smells and noise, as well as employment, to the town, and in 1817 the chief industry was reckoned to be manufacture of agricultural machinery. Both Brewood and Coven also had locksmiths, a speciality also of nearby Wolverhampton and Willenhall.

The forge on the Penk seems to have used a water mill to power its bellows and hammers. This was nothing new, but a medieval technology. The lord of the manor of Brewood was letting out a forge by 1485 and there was probably iron production and working in the woodlands – a pattern very similar to that in nearby areas where rivers ran close by woods that could supply charcoal, as along the Smestow and the Stour. The forge that so annoyed Somerford was built by Thomas Chetwynd of Rugeley and Walter Coleman of Cannock in 1620. A forge in Brewood Park was rented from the Giffard family from the mid-17th century by Thomas Foley (1616–1677) and Philip Foley (1648–1716), perhaps the most famous ironmasters of their period in the West Midlands. In 1717 there were two forges operating in the parish, with a combined output of 100 tons. However, decline had set in by mid-century, with a forge closing in 1753 and the other shortly after. By this time, Brewood was living in the shadow of an Industrial Revolution that transformed the nearby Severn valley, Wolverhampton and the Black Country, but largely passed it by. Abraham Darby I's work in developing coke-fired blast furnaces at Coalbrookdale slowly changed the whole pattern of iron working, moving it towards the coal fields and away from the woods.

=== Local magnates ===
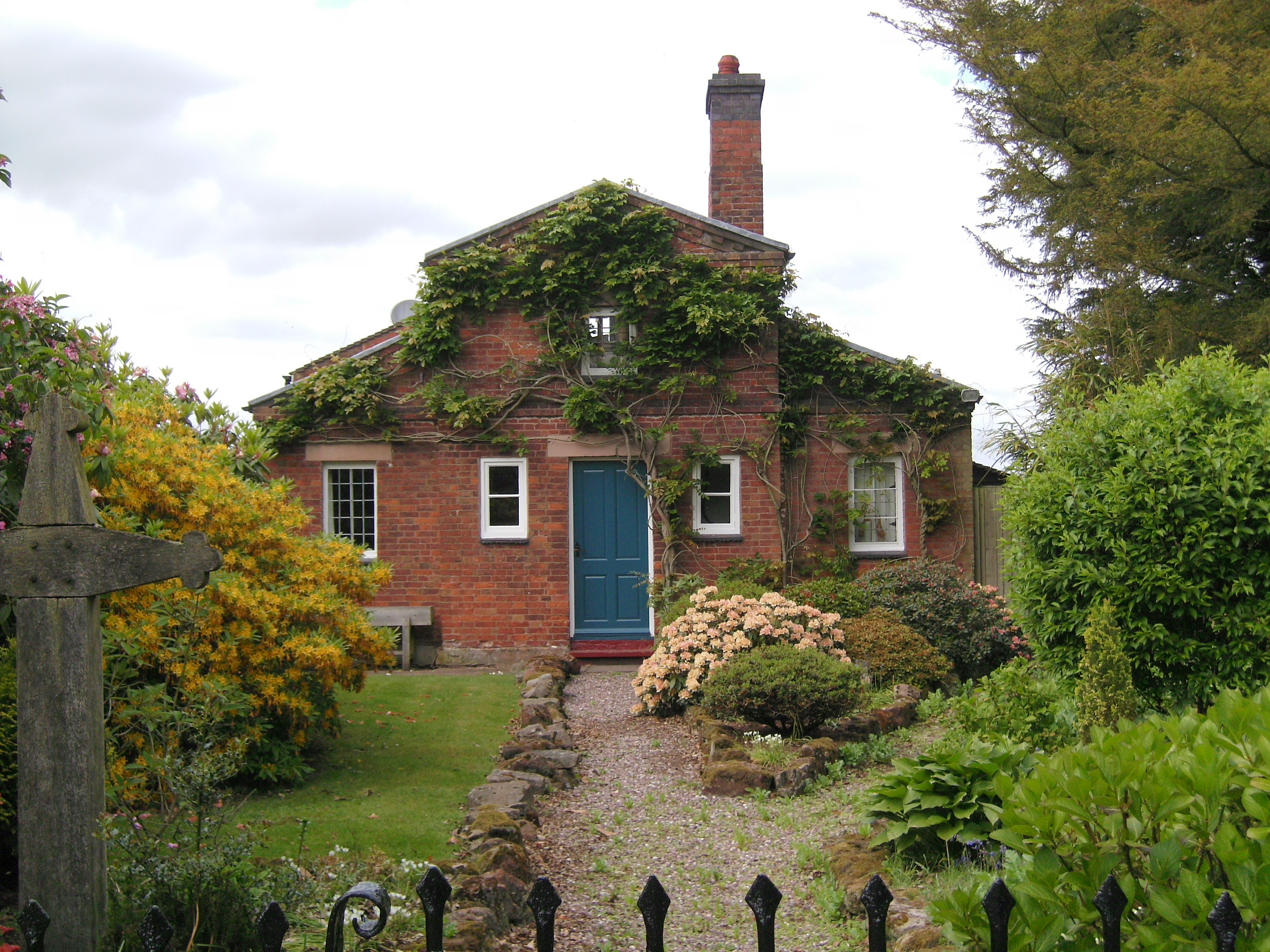
Giffard's Cross and the Georgian entrance lodge at the Upper Avenue, Chillington. The cross is said to commemorate the shooting dead of an escaped and dangerous panther by Sir John Giffard.

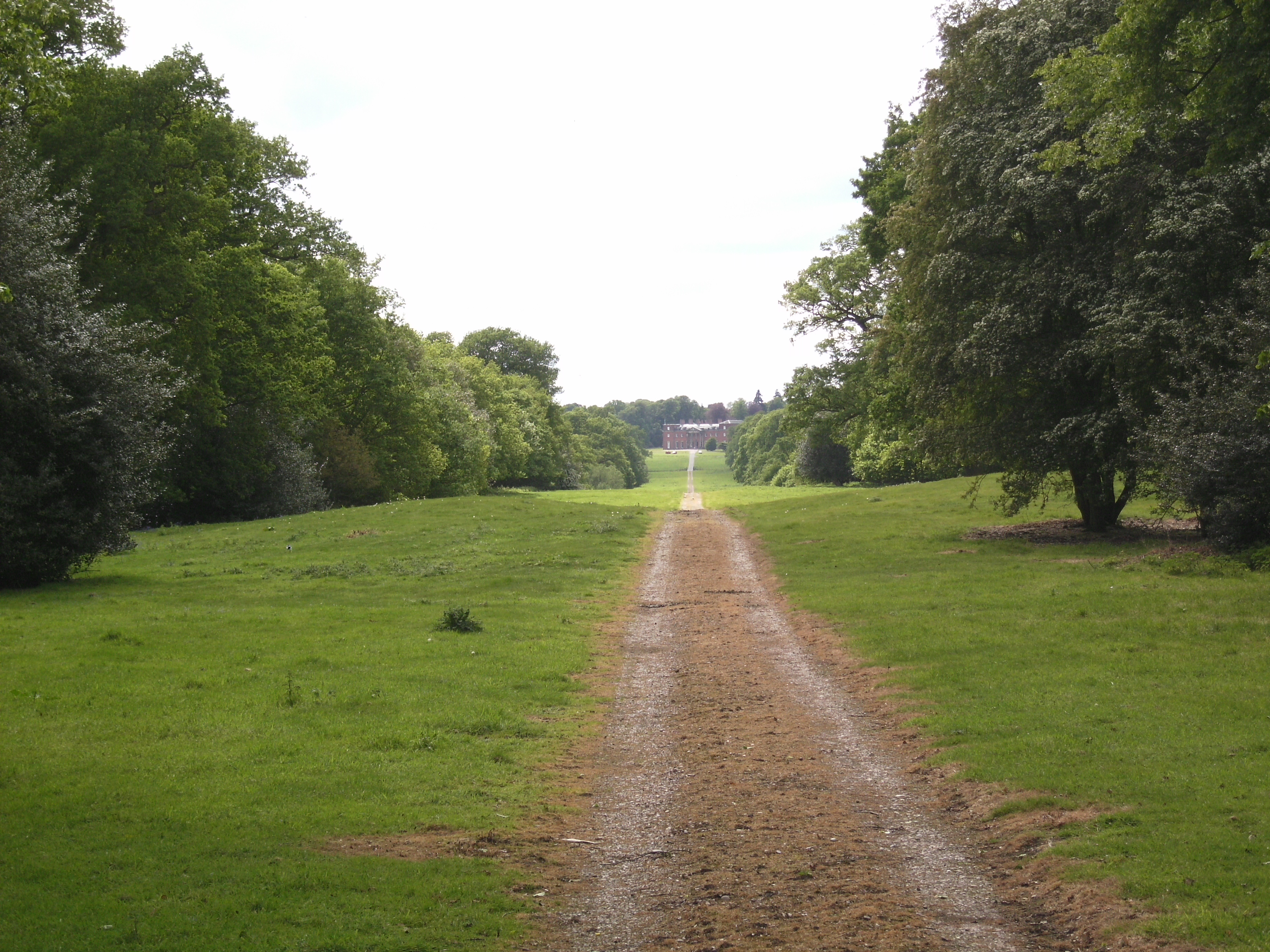
Chillington Hall viewed along the entire length of the Upper Avenue. This immense approach, over a mile long, was driven through the landscape by Peter Giffard in the 1720s, replacing the old route along Chillington Street.

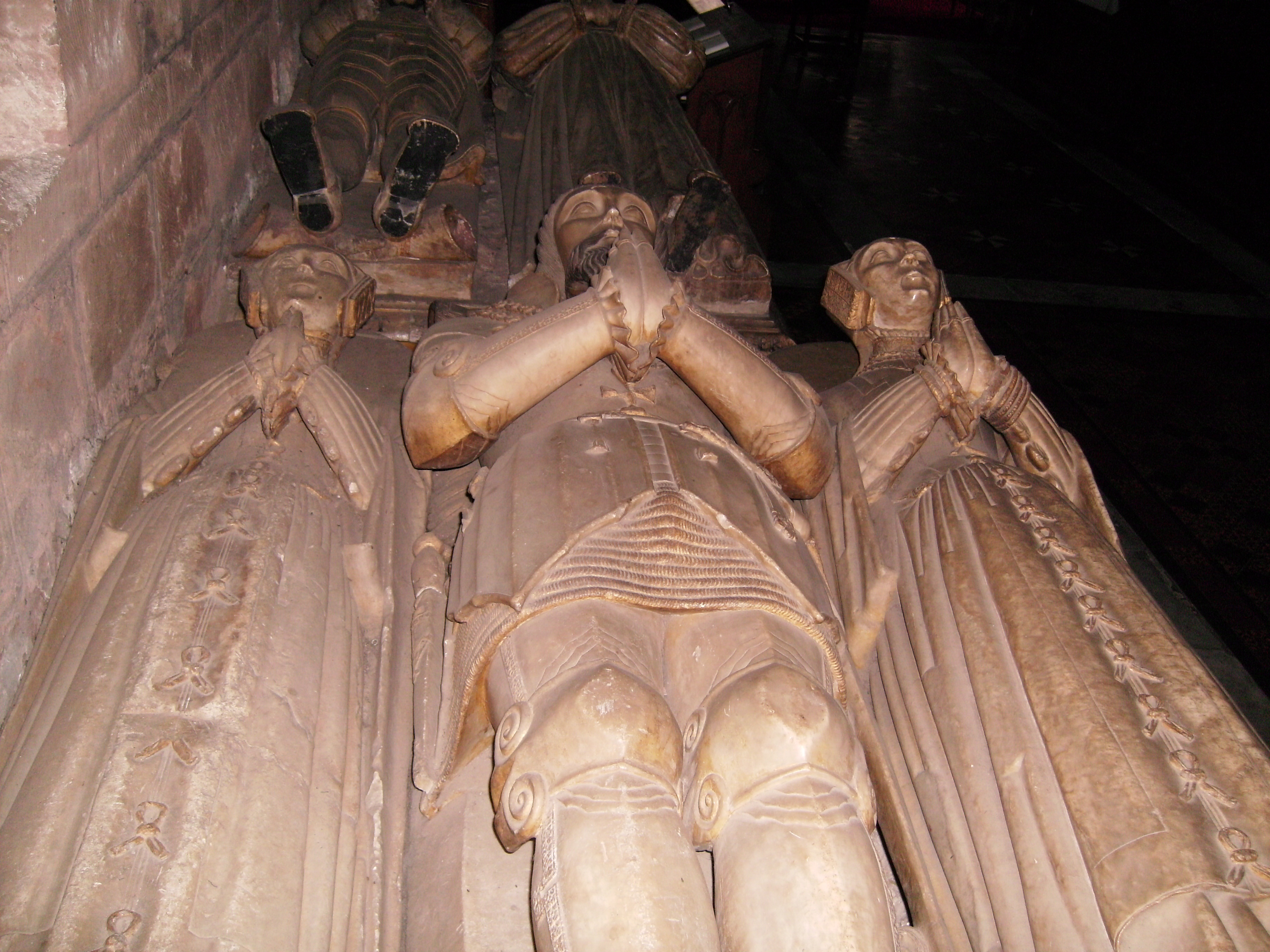
Sir John Giffard, who died in 1556, during the reign of Queen Mary, when Catholicism was temporarily restored. He is flanked by his wives, Jane and Elizabeth.

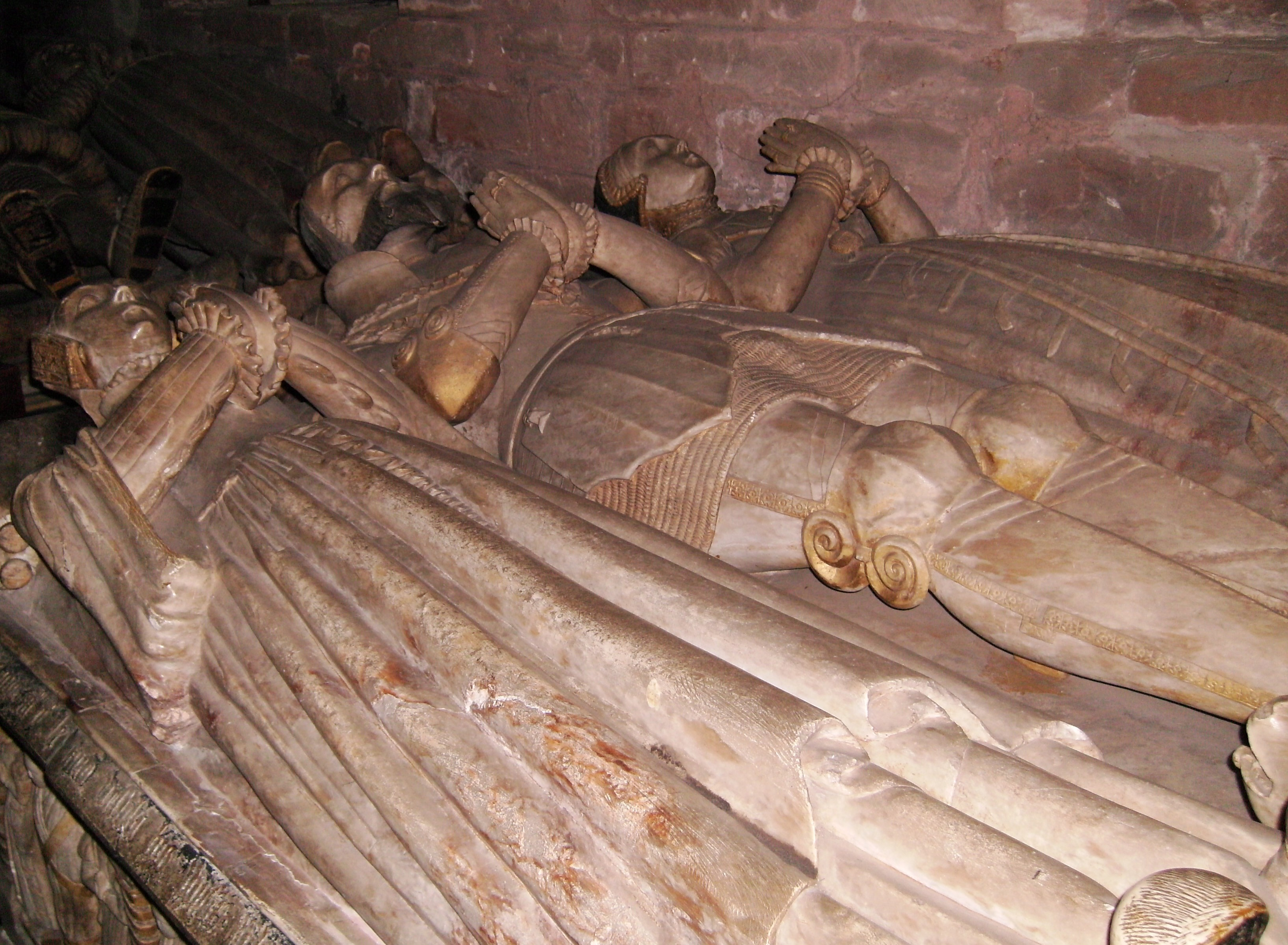
Sir Thomas Giffard, who died in 1560, only four years after his father, Sir John, but when the Reformation had already been renewed under Queen Elizabeth. He is flanked by his wives, Dorothy and Ursula.

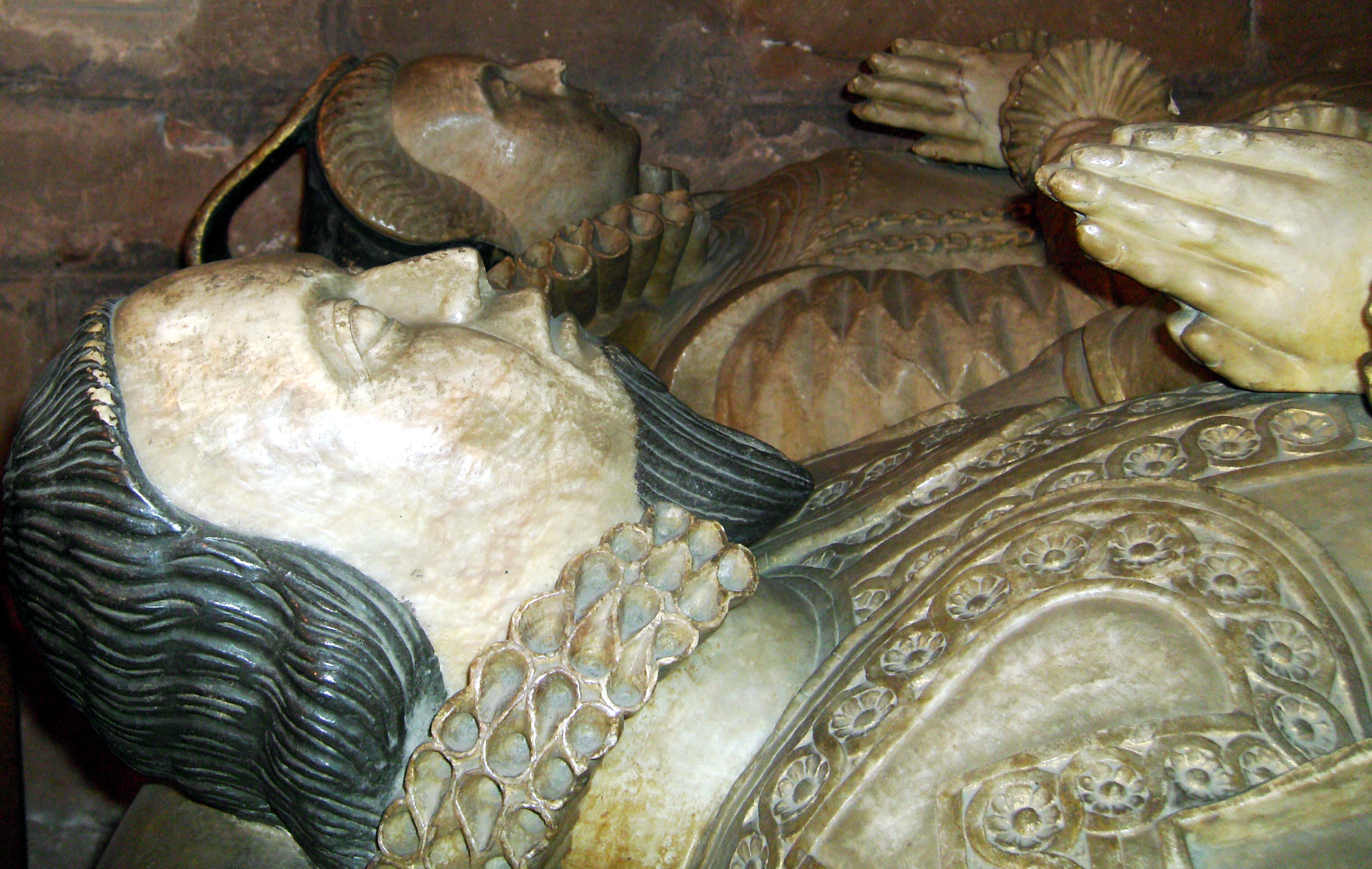
John Giffard and his wife, Joyce Leveson. The son of Sir Thomas, John was fined and imprisoned for Recusancy under Elizabeth.

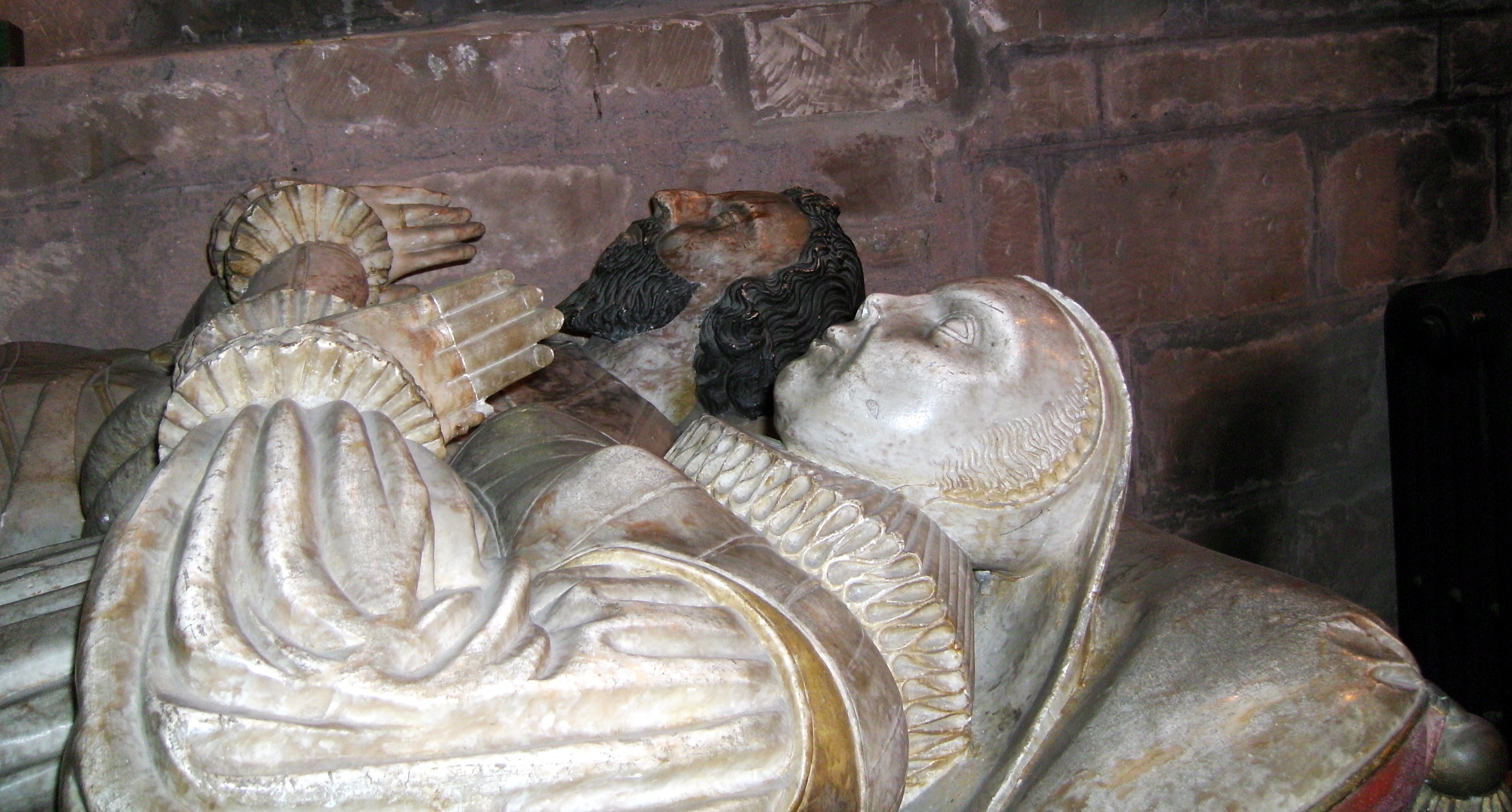
Tomb of Walter Giffard, John's son, who stayed with the Catholic cause in the reign of James I, together with his wife, Phillipa.

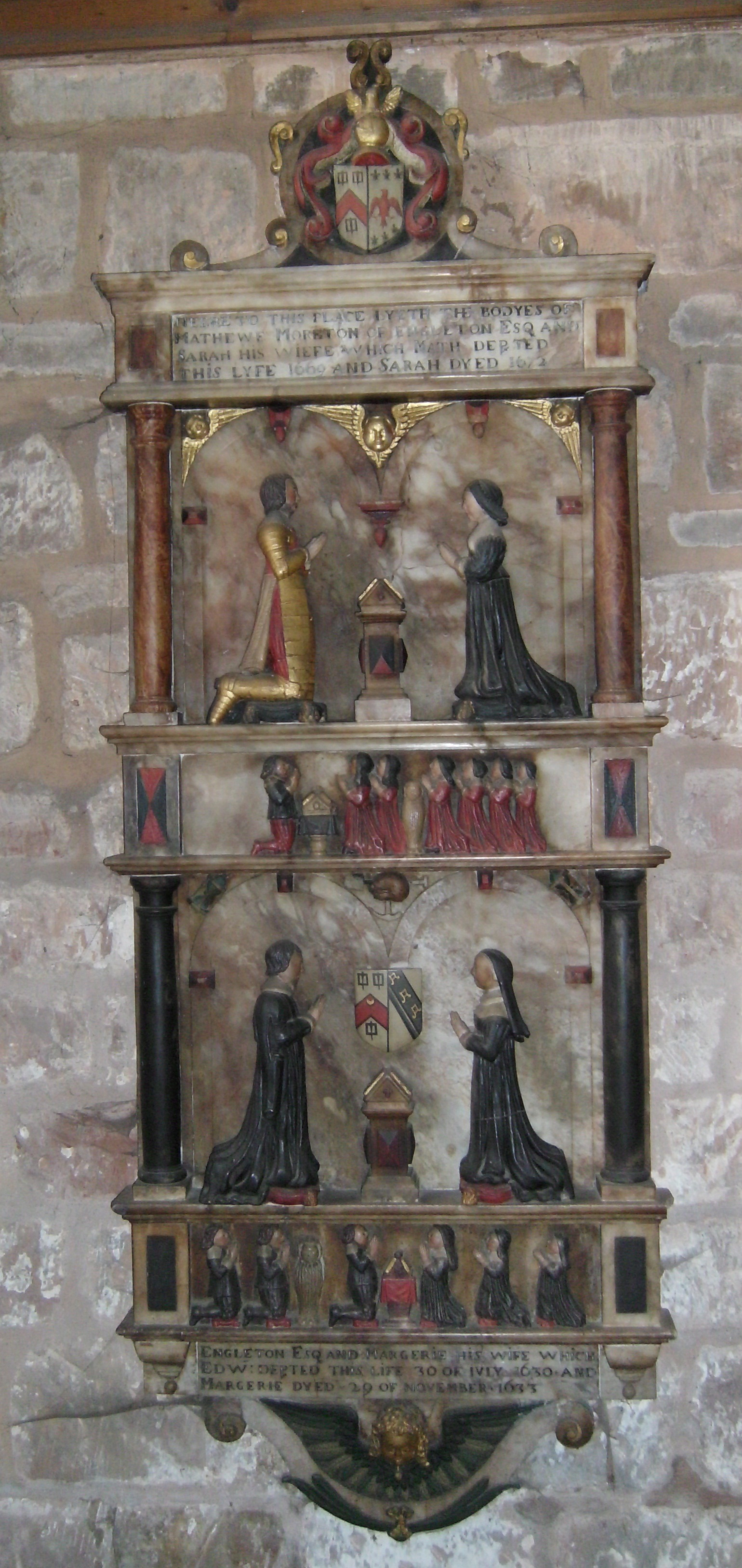
Memorial to Mathew and Sarah Moreton (top) and Edward and Margery Moreton (lower panel), members of an important Staffordshire and Cheshire landowning family, in St Mary's and St Chad's church.

Brewood and the area around it were dominated for centuries by families belonging mainly to the landed gentry, a social class basing its economic, social and cultural power on control over landed estates, but generally not so powerful or influential as the aristocracy. Tracing the ownership of estates in Brewood, it is apparent that there was a great influx of new blood among the landowners in the early 14th century, and that this new group begins to peter out in the 18th century. This neatly brackets the period of gentry dominance, not only in Brewood, but in England generally. The beginning of the period is marked by the end of feudalism in the wake of the Black Death, and a transition to tenant farming and wage labour. The period ends with a prolonged period of crisis, culminating in the Long Depression, that creates the modern countryside.

The only major landowning dynasty to survive in Brewood through all these transitions of the medieval and modern periods were the Giffard family, whose main local seat was, and still is, Chillington Hall, about three miles south-west of the village centre. Their connection with Chillington has been traced back to before 1175: around that date, the then lord of the manor, Peter Corbesun, transferred it to his wife's nephew, Peter Giffard. By the 17th century, the Giffards held the manor of Brewood itself and land in most other parts of the parish. Politically, the family's influence reached a peak with Sir John Giffard, who died in 1556. He was five times Sheriff of Staffordshire and was appointed Ranger of the Seven Hays of the Forest of Cank, i.e. Cannock Chase. For some years a member of the household of Henry VIII, he accompanied the king to the Field of the Cloth of Gold in 1520. After Sir Thomas, his son, died only four years later, Recusancy impeded the family's political ambitions, but less so their financial acumen.

The Giffards were major donors to Brewood's large parish church of St Mary and St Chad, although they had little control over it because of the power of the deanery. The choir of the church contains a number of elaborate alabaster tombs, surmounted by effigies of important family members of the 15th – 17th centuries. One of these, Sir John Giffard, built a substantial mansion at Chillington, probably in the 1540s. Some improvements were made in the early 18th century, to the design of Francis Smith of Warwick, and around 1786 work began on the present Chillington Hall, designed by Sir John Soane – a large Neo-Classical structure, which incorporates Smith's earlier work. At the dissolution of the monasteries in the reign of Henry VIII, the Giffards purchased the buildings and lands of both Blackladies, a Benedictine convent just west of Brewood, and White Ladies Priory, an Augustinian convent, about three miles west of the village, in Shropshire. Both were adapted for residential use. On the land of White Ladies, a short distance north of the former priory buildings, they adapted a farmhouse into a hunting lodge, which they named Boscobel House. The name signifies "beautiful woods", and originally stood in woodland, although it is also reminiscent of the family's Norman ancestor. The Giffards also held lands in other parts of the parish, sometimes intertwined with those of other important local landowners.

The Lane family of Bentley Hall had considerable holdings and influence in the Brewood area, starting in the early 15th century. At Broom Hall, north-west of Brewood town, they held land from the early 15th century. By the 16th, the Giffards also held land here and let some of it to the Careless family. In 1715, the Giffards and Lanes agreed to an amicable re-allocation of land so that they could exploit it more efficiently. Another important Lane family holding was at the Hyde, between Brewood and Chillington, which they acquired at the same time as Broom Hall and owned until the late 18th century. They also acquired land at Coven from the 1430'3, gradually replacing the Coven family, the original Norman landowners, but selling to the Wrottesley family, from the Tettenhall area, in the early 18th century.

The Moreton family, who originated in Moreton, Gnosall and had considerable estates in Staffordshire, first appear at Engleton, on the Penk, in the mid-16th century. By the late 17th century, with the Giffards isolated by Recusancy, the Moretons were the most important lay presence in the parish church, marked by a magnificent memorial for Mathew and Sarah Moreton. Their grandson, Matthew Ducie Moreton (1663–1735), went a stage further, being elevated to the peerage as 1st Baron Ducie. However, the estate passed to a junior branch of the family in the 18th century and was sold to Edward Monckton in 1811.

Monckton was a younger son of John Monckton, 1st Viscount Galway (1695–1751) and the brother of the distinguished soldier and colonial administrator Robert Monckton. He was already a major landowner in the area, a nabob whose fortune came from his adventures and trading deals in India. Around 1779, he had acquired Somerford Hall, due west of Brewood, and always an important centre of influence locally. Long held by the Somerford family, who first appear in the 1120s, Somerford passed through the hands of Sir Walter Wrottesley, the third Baronet of the same name, in the early 18th century. Robert Barbor, a wealthy lawyer, who held it for a time after the Wrottesleys, built a substantial Georgian house. Monckton remodelled and enlarged the house, garnishing it with Adam style features. His wealth gave him great influence and he was able to reshape the landscape to his requirements. The road to Wolverhampton passed straight through the Somerford grounds, which Monckton was reforesting and improving. At a hotly contested vestry meeting in 1781 he tried to have it routed further south, to cross the Penk at Somerford Mill. It emerged that this would throw the expenses of construction and maintenance on the parish. So Monckton agreed to divert it to the north of his property and paid to construct a new section to Four Ashes, on the main turnpike road between Wolverhampton and Stafford.

=== Recusancy and dissent ===
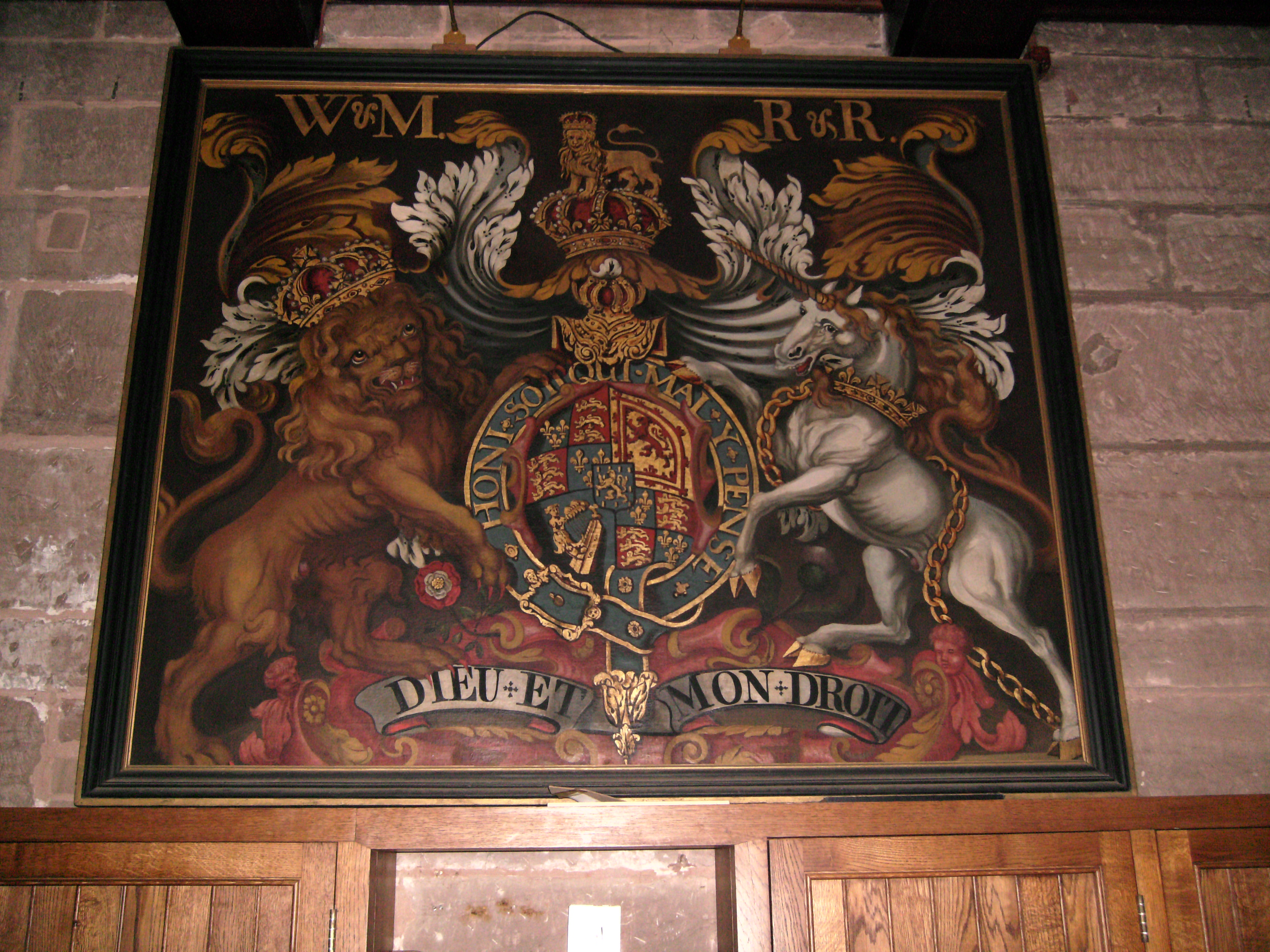
Arms of William and Mary in Brewood parish church. These were displayed by law in all churches after the Glorious Revolution, when the English Penal Laws against both Catholics and Protestant dissenters were in full force.

Like many of the Staffordshire and Shropshire gentry, the Giffard family remained Catholic Recusants throughout the Reformation and the English Civil War, sheltering priests and hearing mass in their houses, despite continuing to be buried in ornate tombs in the chancel of the Anglican parish church for four generations of religious turmoil and persecution. John Giffard, who held Chillington in the reign of Elizabeth I came into direct confrontation with the monarch. Elizabeth stayed at Chillington on the night of 11 August 1575 and was able to see for herself that he did not attend Anglican worship, despite having promised to do so. On this occasion he was fined, but five years later he was imprisoned. John's son, Walter, maintained the family's support for the Catholic cause in the reign of James I. Hoping that the Stuart monarchs would relax some of the discrimination they suffered, the Giffard family took the royalist side in the Civil Wars. Andrew Giffard of Chillington was killed in a skirmish, fighting for Charles I.

The network of alliances and patronage among the gentry of Brewood played a pivotal role in the escape of Charles II after his defeat by Parliamentary forces at the Battle of Worcester in 1651. Most famously, White Ladies Priory and Boscobel House, together with nearby Moseley Old Hall, provided refuge for Charles as he sought a way out of the West Midlands. It was at Boscobel that the king hid from his pursuers in an oak tree, as well as in one of the priest holes inside the building. The king was cared for by members of the Pendrell or Penderel family, who rented land and had a farm on the Boscobel estate – . He was accompanied in the oak by another recusant Catholic native of Brewood, Colonel William Careless of Broom Hall. Finally, Charles was spirited away from the Midlands mainly by the efforts of Jane Lane of Bentley, whose family were major landowners in Brewood, although Protestant and formerly supporters of Parliament. The Giffards were deprived of most of their property by Parliament and recovered it only on the Restoration of Charles II. Charles publicised the role of those local Catholics who aided his escape and a not entirely reliable account of his adventures by Thomas Blount, published after his Restoration in 1660, was actually entitled Boscobel.

Gentry support kept the number of Catholics in Brewood relatively high. The figure was given as 74 in 1641 and a very considerable 399 in 1780. Most of the Giffards' tenants and servants were Catholic until the mid-19th century. One of Andrew Giffard's sons, Bonaventure Giffard (1642–1734), was the Roman Catholic Vicar Apostolic of the Midland District of England from 1687 until 1703 – effectively the first Roman Catholic bishop of the area after the Reformation – and he was assisted by his brother, another Andrew, also a bishop. These were the first steps towards rebuilding the Catholic hierarchy in England after the Reformation

The Catholic community at Brewood used the chapel at Chillington for baptisms and weddings from about 1721, but it was demolished to make way for the enlargement of the house around 1786. After that they used the chapel at Blackladies, which became effectively a church for the community, with two priests. In 1727, while Catholics were still prohibited from opening public places of worship, the building of Giffard House was commenced in the centre of Wolverhampton. Purportedly a town residence for the family, it was actually a chapel for the Catholic population of the area – the first urban place of worship built for the Roman Catholic Church since the Reformation.

In the 19th century, after Catholic Emancipation, the Giffard family were able to give lavishly and publicly to local Catholic causes. Most importantly, they gave the land and subsidised the priest's stipend for the Roman Catholic Church of St Mary in Brewood itself. This was one of fourteen buildings in Staffordshire designed by Augustus Welby Pugin and promoted by John Talbot, 16th Earl of Shrewsbury, in the period 1836–48, as part of a campaign to revive and consolidate Catholicism in the region. It is in Pugin's characteristic Gothic Revival style and was opened in 1844. It stands on land formerly belonging to Blackladies, overlooking the canal. However, from this time, the influence of the gentry in English Catholicism was on the wane, as immigration from Ireland brought large Catholic working class communities to towns like Wolverhampton, making it an urban faith.

Meanwhile, the struggle of Protestant dissenters to establish themselves in Brewood was even harder. Without gentry support, they seem to have been led mostly by townspeople of some education but little money, probably shopkeepers and artisans. George Whitefield's Calvinist Methodist preachers visited the town in 1745. However, when the eminent Nonconformist preacher George Burder tried to address a meeting in a barn in 1775, it was attacked by a mob. Several houses were certified for dissenters' meetings over the years, but none of the communities seems to have lasted long. The first sign of real progress came after 1800, when John Simpson, the parish clerk defected from the Anglican church. By 1803, he had persuaded his brother-in-law, James Neale, a Londer dissenter, to pay for a small Congregationalist chapel, which was built in Sandy Lane. The little community grew, aided by holiday working parties of students from New College at Hackney, a dissenting academy, and the chapel had to be extended in 1825 and rebuilt in 1842.

After this, the Methodists too got a foothold in the area. The first Wesleyan chapel was built at Coven in 1828 and replaced with a bigger building in 1839. In 1831, William Holland, a Brewood lock-maker, and his brother George got their house certified as a meeting house, with a congregation of three. They persevered and by 1851 they were using part of a house in Shop Lane, moving to an 80-seater Primitive Methodist chapel in Pendryl Avenue seven years later. In 1868, the Wesleyans too opened a chapel in Brewood. Gradually the old consensuses in religion, as in much else, were breaking down as the countryside entered a period of dislocation and change.

=== The Victorian crisis ===
Brewood in the early 19th century still seemed a hive of economic activity. These were good times for agriculture, with the Napoleonic Wars and the Corn Laws protecting producers against foreign competition. From the 1840s, things changed for the worse. Since there are reliable statistics for this period, based on the UK Census it is fairly easy to chart the decline.

Population graph, 1801–1961

The 1831 census marks a peak in population for the Brewood parish of 3,799. After that date, there is decline for the rest of the century, and only a modest recovery in the 20th century. In fact, the 1831 peak was not surpassed until the housing boom of the 1950s, even the expansion of the parish in 1934 failing to lift the population by much. The fall in the male population throughout the Victorian period is particularly significant. There were 2,099 males in 1831, although this was unusually high, perhaps because this was the year canal building commenced at Brewood. The figures for 1841 and 1851 hover around 1,800, but this plunges to 1,180 in 1901. The female population was much steadier, reaching a peak in 1851, and outnumbering the male from that point onwards. One of the results of population decline was a proliferation of empty houses. In 1831 only six of the 699 houses in the parish were unoccupied. In 1891, 84 houses out of 630 stood vacant – about 13.3% or more than one in eight.

Figures for employment in various occupations are generally hard to interpret, as definitions changed through the century. However, it is relatively easy to extract those for agriculture. The 1831 census found that the parish had 377 adult male agricultural labourers and 76 farmers, of whom about half were employers of labour, while the rest presumably relied on their own family. This gives a total of 453 men directly earning their living on the land. The 1881 census gives a more detailed analysis under so-called occupational orders, but this mainly affects industrial occupations. Adult male agricultural employment is stated simply as 317, although the women agricultural workers are now also numbered – at just three. Almost a third of jobs on the land have gone in 50 years, and it is a process that can only continue.

Not only did the Long Depression grip world agriculture for almost a quarter of a century, but any relief was slight and temporary. After World War I, the even deeper Great Depression was to place more pressure on agriculture. Moreover, there were changes in farming techniques that tended to drive down employment even when the market was good. Boscobel House has a good selection of late Victorian and early 20th century farm machinery. Still horse-powered, it is nevertheless ingenious and substantial, and manufactured already in the Uttoxeter area or along the Humber, not locally. It had the power to displace many labourers. A simple potato plough, for example, could harvest several acres a day, undermining the bargaining power of labourers at precisely the time of year when it was traditionally strongest, and starving families of the little extra, often earned by women and children, that cleared debts and kept their heads above water. When less successful farmers sold out to the more efficient, the effect was irreversible: employers did not sacrifice efficiencies of scale when the times were better. By 1940, eleven of the farms exceeded 150 acres – very different from the small holdings of one and two centuries earlier – and the full effects of mechanisation and scientific agriculture were yet to be felt.

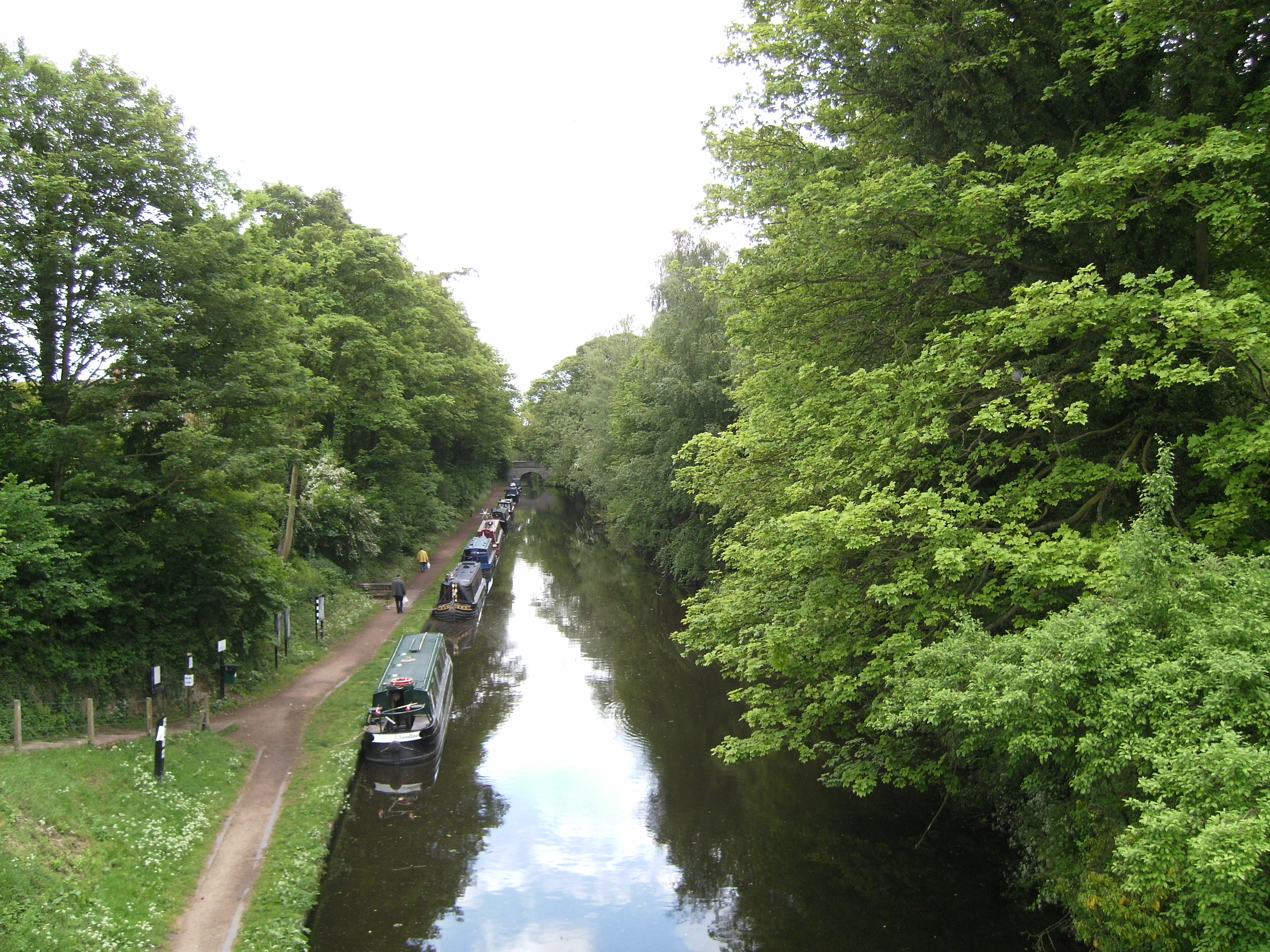
The canal viewed southward from Brewood. The wharves are still lined with boats, but nearly all are leisure craft.

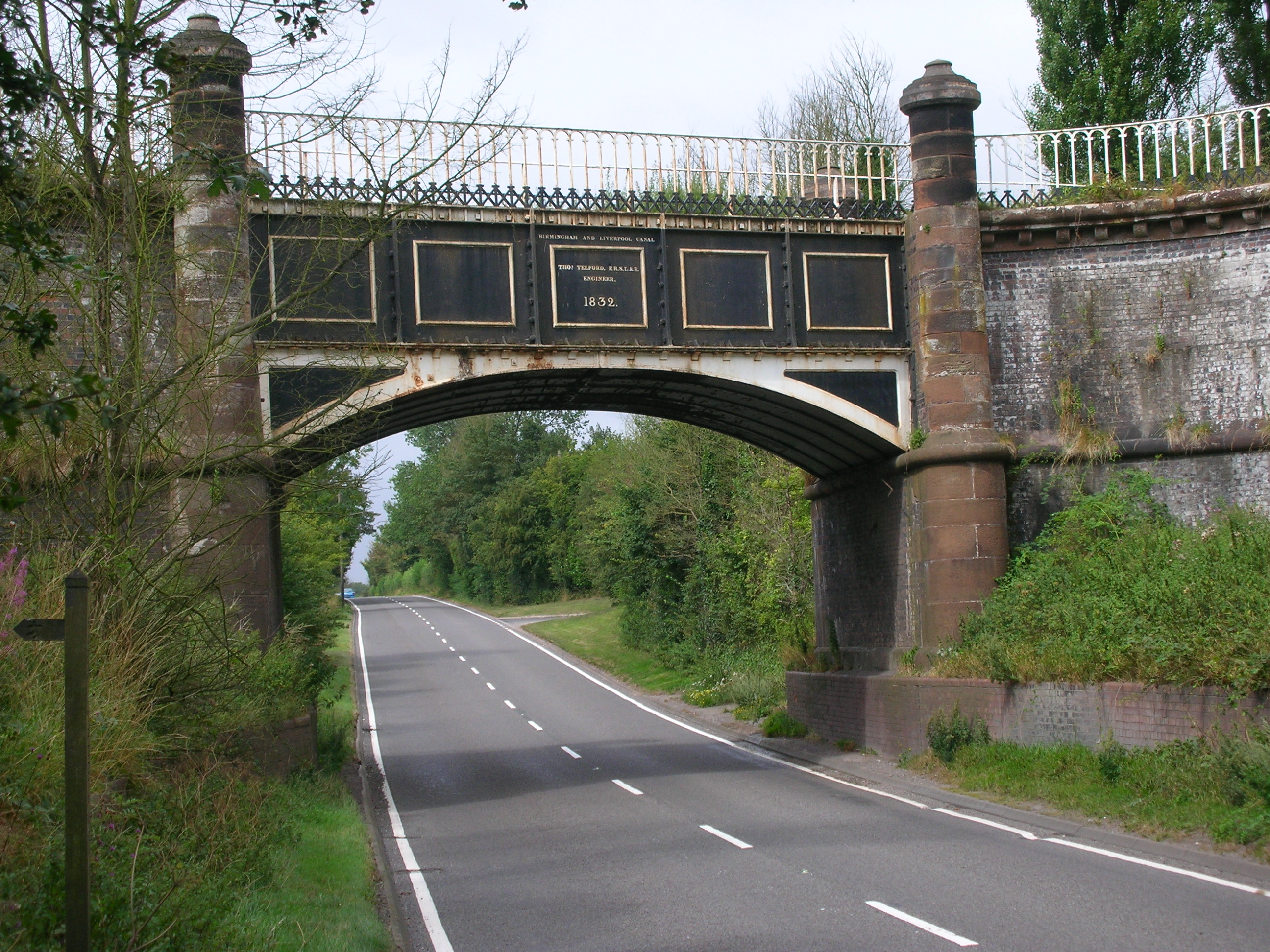
Thomas Telford's Stretton Aqueduct carrying the Shropshire Union Canal over the A5

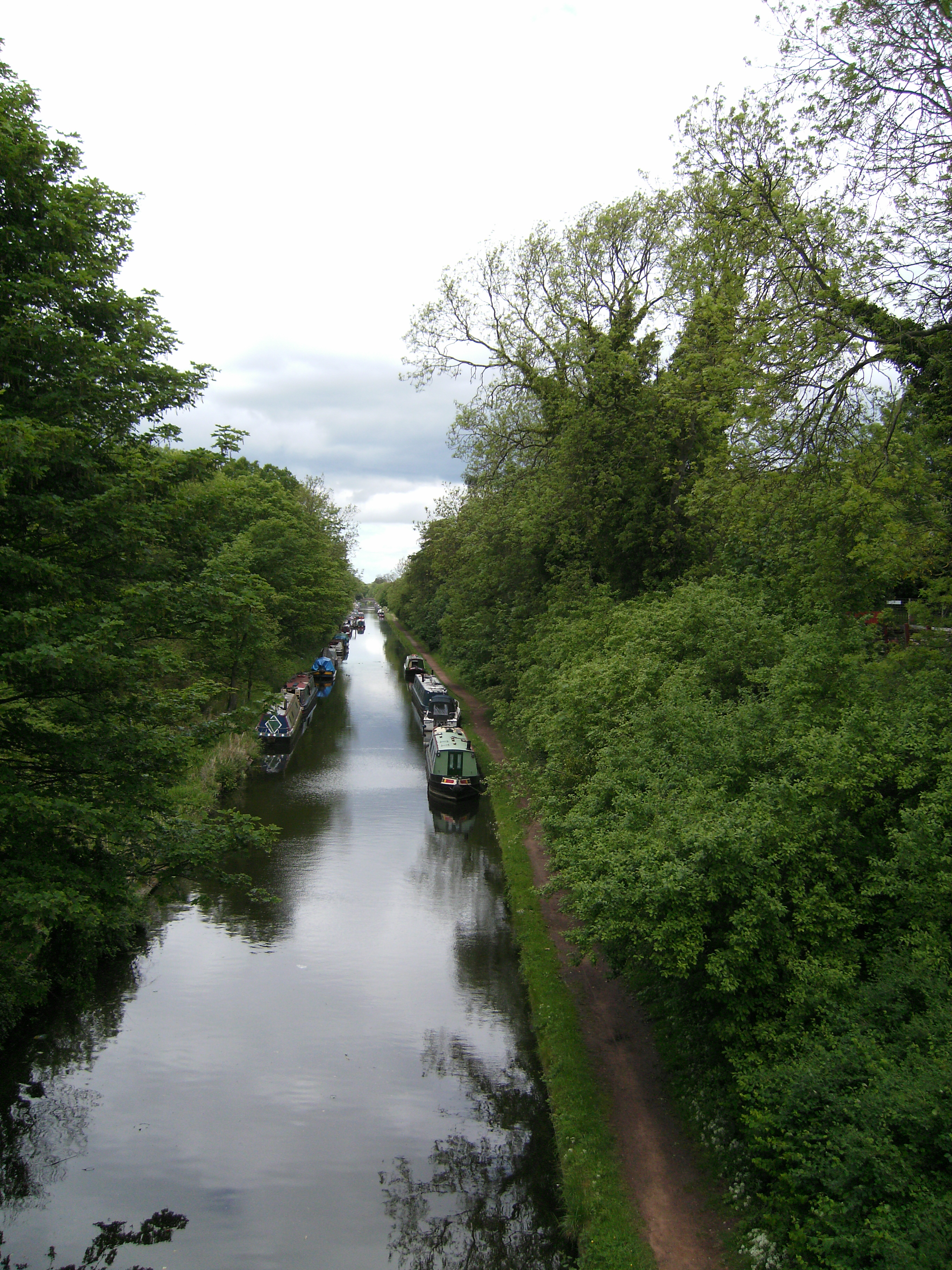
The canal below the Roman Catholic church, viewed northward from the bridge at Brewood

There were many signs of decline to confirm this overall pattern. The weekly market had ceased and the market cross fell down in 1810. Attempts to revive it came to nothing in the face of growing prosperity elsewhere. Iron working disappeared altogether, and the other industries declined. Malting gave employment in mid-century, but soon followed the other trades into decline. Other improvements arrived too late or gave too little. Work began on the Birmingham and Liverpool Junction Canal (now the Shropshire Union Canal) in 1830, but progress was slow and it was not opened until 1843. It passed north to south straight through the parish, with large wharves on the western edge of Brewood itself and at Chillington. The large Belvide Reservoir supplied water to the canal and also provided fishing. However, the great days of canals were already over: although it brought some welcome employment and trade, especially during the early phases of its construction, it did not stimulate the long-term growth Brewood needed. The railway, much more revolutionary in its impact, merely grazed the parish, with a station at Four Ashes and two trains a day initially – essentially a commuter route from the very beginning. Brewood needed a station of its own to fire commerce. An extension of the railway from Bushbury to Brewood was in the planning stage in 1874, but it never happened.

This decline contrasts strongly with the national pattern. While agriculture was in trouble everywhere, industrial and urban Victorian Britain was growing fast. Between 1831 and 1901, the population of Brewood fell from almost 3,800 to just over 2,500 a reduction of about a third – perhaps a little exaggerated by the presence of migrant navvies at the earlier date. In the same period the population of England as a whole soared from just under 13 million. to about 32.5 million – almost two and a half times the size. Even nearby villages in Staffordshire outperformed Brewood. Wombourne, for example, had a rising population through most of the Victorian period and only saw a falling back during the worst of the Long Depression. Most importantly, of course, the nearby industrial town of Wolverhampton doubled its population from about 47,000 to 94,000 – a figure which leaves out of account its growing suburbs. Clearly there was population drift from Brewood – probably towards the much greater employment opportunities of the industrial towns, like Wolverhampton and the Black Country.

In 1872, the curfew bell, which had been rung each winter evening since the Middle Ages, ceased. Within two years even the Sunday "Pudding Bell" and the Shrove Tuesday "Pancake Bell" had followed it into memory. It seemed that the countryside was falling silent.

This was not the case throughout the parish. At its extremities, there were considerable signs of life. In both cases, a local landowning family played an important part in promoting and consolidating the facilities needed by a growing community. To the west it was the Evans family, who had bought Boscobel, initially as a holiday home. Once established, they fell in love with the place and did much to elaborate the legend of Boscobel as a royalist shrine. They also put a great deal of money into the new community of Bishops Wood, which adjoined their property. At the eastern edge of the parish, the Monckton family, with their combination of business acumen and philanthropic zeal, helped save the situation.

In the 18th century, Bishops Wood had no human inhabitants – only a rabbit warren leased by the Giffards to one John Blakemore. and a few animals grazed there. In the early 19th century it was still just pasture land, but in 1844, the Diocese and the lessee, T. W. Giffard, agreed to enclose it. It proved immediately popular with those, both inside and outside the parish, who wanted to create a new home or a smallholding. Within a decade, this former waste place needed a church of its own to accommodate its Anglican residents.

Coven had already received a great stimulus from the improvement of communications. The main road between Wolverhampton and Stafford, which passed very close to Coven, was turnpiked under an Stafford, Worcester and Warwick Roads Act 1760 (1 Geo. 3. c. 39). The Staffordshire and Worcestershire Canal was built between 1768 and 1772, passing very close to Coven, and bringing into existence the hamlet of Coven Heath, just beyond the southern boundary of the parish at that point. Both of these were vast improvements in their day. Coven was brought much closer to the growing urban centres of the Industrial Revolution, just as Brewood town was passed by. As a result, most of the growth in population and the new housing within the parish, through to the early 20th century, appeared either at Coven or along the Kiddemore Green Road to Bishops Wood, not in Brewood itself.

Just north of Coven, Four Ashes, originally just a pub fronted by four ash trees, grew into a small distinct settlement, boosted not just by increased traffic on the main road, but by Edward Monckton's diversion of the Brewood-Wolverhampton route. Significantly, Monckton either owned or soon bought, Four Ashes as part of his Somerford estate. From 1785, Four Ashes was visited every night by the Birmingham-Liverpool mail coach, and from 1810 the Bristol-Manchester mail coach called each day. Brewood acquired a coach stop, on the London to Liverpool run, only later, and that needed extra horses to get it over the bad road through Bishops Wood to Watling Street. Not surprisingly, a rival operator soon opened up a route through Four Ashes and Gailey, by-passing the old town. The arrival of the railway killed most of Four Ashes' coach connections but gave the eastern edge of the parish a huge advantage that the centre could not match. Four Ashes was to evolve into the main industrial zone of the area. Such were changes in population distribution and economic activity that ran alongside the general decline, and ran against it in defined localities. They redrew the map of Brewood, creating the three-centred structure which persists to this day.

Education was the main focus for philanthropic efforts. The origins of the present Church of England primary school in Brewood lie in a scheme to set up an Anglican National School drawn up in 1816 and already in the process of implementation two years later. By 1834, several decades before primary education became compulsory, about 140 were being schooled by subscription, and the roll was around 110 in 1851, with a master and a mistress to teach them. In 1870, the school's finances received a welcome boost in the form of a bequest of £2000 from Revd. Henry Kempson, formerly headmaster of Brewood Grammar School. Meanwhile, the Evans family had paid to start both primary education for Catholic children at Blackladies and a National School at Bishops Wood: in fact, Miss Evans actually taught at the latter. The Monckton family too supported a dame school for their tenants' and workers' children at Somerford, before George Monckton switched their support to growing Coven, where a National School accompanied the new St Paul's church, largely built at the Monckton's expense.

=== Post market-town ===
Brewood is considered a village in modern-times, although its roots of a market town are still evident and it shares a similar status to nearby Penkridge, which is considered a town more than a large village. This is almost entirely to a complete change of character in which Brewood and the other centres alike have evolved from places of work to places of residence. One of the paradoxes of the period of decline was that houses were being built at the same time that other houses stood empty and fell into decay. In fact the total number of houses stood up well, at above 700, throughout the Victorian period, before plunging to a recorded low of 615 in 1921. It seems that the drift to the towns was already partly balanced by building at and around Coven, as middle-class workers and professionals discovered they could live in the country but work in the town – something made possible especially by the railway. In the 20th century, this residential growth became the central feature of Brewood's history – especially after World War II, when rising general prosperity and the ubiquity of the motor car totally transformed the situation of the Village and the parish as a whole.

Despite the general gloom of the late Victorian period, many features of modernity were not especially slow to arrive in Brewood. The town had its own gas works from about 1872 until around World War I, when Stafford council took over the supply. Mains electricity arrived in 1928, and was available throughout the parish by 1940. The Four Ashes Manufacturing Company opened its carbon works in the early 1920s, beginning the transformation of Four Ashes into an industrial zone that now stretches both sides of the main Wolverhampton-Stafford road. That road, now the A449 road, was turned into a dual carriageway between 1936 and 1939, responding to the increasing importance of motor vehicles. The majority of the muddy or stony lanes that had isolated so much of the parish, including Brewood itself, yielded to tarmac between the wars or shortly after.

Road building gathered pace after World War II and Brewood was to find itself at a favoured corner of the motorway network – albeit after long delays in planning and execution. The M6 motorway came around Stafford in 1962 but did not link to the M1 motorway until 1971. The M54 motorway was opposed by Staffordshire County Council and took a long time to complete. Nevertheless, in 1983 it opened, cutting through to Telford just to the south of Coven, a fast, modern link shadowing the ancient Watling Street. Already a new Birmingham North Relief Road was under discussion. Although the debate seemed interminable, when it finally arrived in the form of the M6 Toll motorway, construction was swift, with a start made in 2000 and the road in use by the end of 2003.

After decades of stagnation the population of Brewood parish began to rise a little in the 1920s. After the War, the rise became rapid, and in the 1950s headlong. The recorded rise was from 3,576 in 1951 to 5,751 in 1961 – more than 60% in a single decade. This was the result of large-scale housing development. While Coven continued to grow, Brewood sprouted a series of developments to the north-east, some built by the council and some private. This growth has continued to the present. The private car overcame all the obstacles in the way of growth but changed the entire nature of the place. The vast majority of residents now work outside the area. With the coming of the motorway network, the ease of commuting was greatly increased, bringing almost the whole of the West Midlands region within easy daily travel distance.

== Brewood today ==
Today, Brewood still retains amenities ranging from small local businesses to agricultural and other industrial estates. The town has a hotel, convenience shops, public houses and a community hall. As well as being the location of the Coven and Brewood Parish Council. The church also continues to be an important place of worship and there have been limited housing developments around the town.

== Transport ==
Brewood is served by Select bus service 876 to Wolverhampton and Stafford Monday-Saturday.

Previously National Express West Midlands operated service 54 on an hourly basis Monday-Saturday between Wolverhampton and Stafford but this was withdrawn due to cuts in funding by the owners of the i54 Business Park. Arriva Midlands operated daily service 876 (later renumbered 76) between Wolverhampton and Stafford but this largely commercial service was cut mostly due to competition from service 54. In terms of railway, Brewood's nearest active station is Penkridge. There was formerly a station in Gailey and Four Ashes. These both, however closed back in 1951 and 1959. The stations were both over three miles from the actual town itself.

== Definition ==
The current Civil Parish of Brewood and Coven has a population of around 7,500, mostly grouped in four distinct villages:

- Brewood
- Bishops Wood
- Coven
- Coven Heath.

The civil parish boundaries are based on those of the ancient parish of Brewood, which likewise included Coven and Bishop's Wood, although not Coven Heath. Despite the emergence of distinct civil and ecclesiastical parishes under the Victorian Poor Law, the civil parish remained almost identical to the ancient parish for more than a century. To this day, the only change, and a fairly minor one, is the addition of a small corner of neighbouring Bushbury parish, when the latter was absorbed into Wolverhampton in 1934. This brought Coven Heath and Brinsford into the parish.

The entire ecclesiastical parish was served by the church of St Mary and St Chad, probably from Anglo-Saxon times and certainly from the 12th century, until the Victorian period. In 1852, Bishops Wood, to the west, was given its own chapelry, followed by the eastern hamlet of Coven in 1858. Coven, together with Coven Heath, evolved into and remained a separate ecclesiastical parish, served by St Paul's church. The remainder of the ancient parish is now a single ecclesiastical parish, served by the two churches of St Mary and St Chad, Brewood, and St John the Evangelist, Bishops Wood.

=== Governance ===
Brewood is part of a two-tier system of local government, with an additional parish community council.

The top layer authority, to which Brewood and Coven elects a single representative, is Staffordshire County Council. This has differed greatly in the area it has covered, but Brewood has been part of it in all its manifestations since the Administrative County was established in 1889.

The lower-tier authority, to which Brewood and Coven elects three representatives, is South Staffordshire District Council. This was formed in 1974 through the merger of Cannock Rural District and Seisdon Rural District. Brewood had been a part of Cannock Rural District since 1894, and was included in its predecessor, the Cannock Rural Sanitary District from its inception in 1875. Prior to this, Brewood was included in the East Cuttlestone Hundred of the Ancient County of Staffordshire. On 14 January 2003 the parish was renamed from "Brewood" to "Brewood & Coven".

Brewood has had a parish council since time immemorial. Evolved from a vestry system of government by local notables in the early modern period, it became an elected Civil Parish council in Victorian times. It now has a community council which styles itself The Parish of Brewood and Coven with Bishops Wood and Coven Heath.

=== Politics ===
In UK parliamentary elections until 2024, Brewood and Coven formed a part of the South Staffordshire constituency. It is now part of Stone, Great Wyrley and Penkridge constituency. The local MP remains the Conservative Gavin Williamson. From 1974 to 2010, the MP was the Conservative Sir Patrick Cormack.

Brewood's representative on Staffordshire County Council is Mark E Sutton, Conservative. It is represented on South Staffordshire District Council by three Conservative councillors, Wendy Sutton, Diane Holmes and Joyce Bolton.

== Features ==
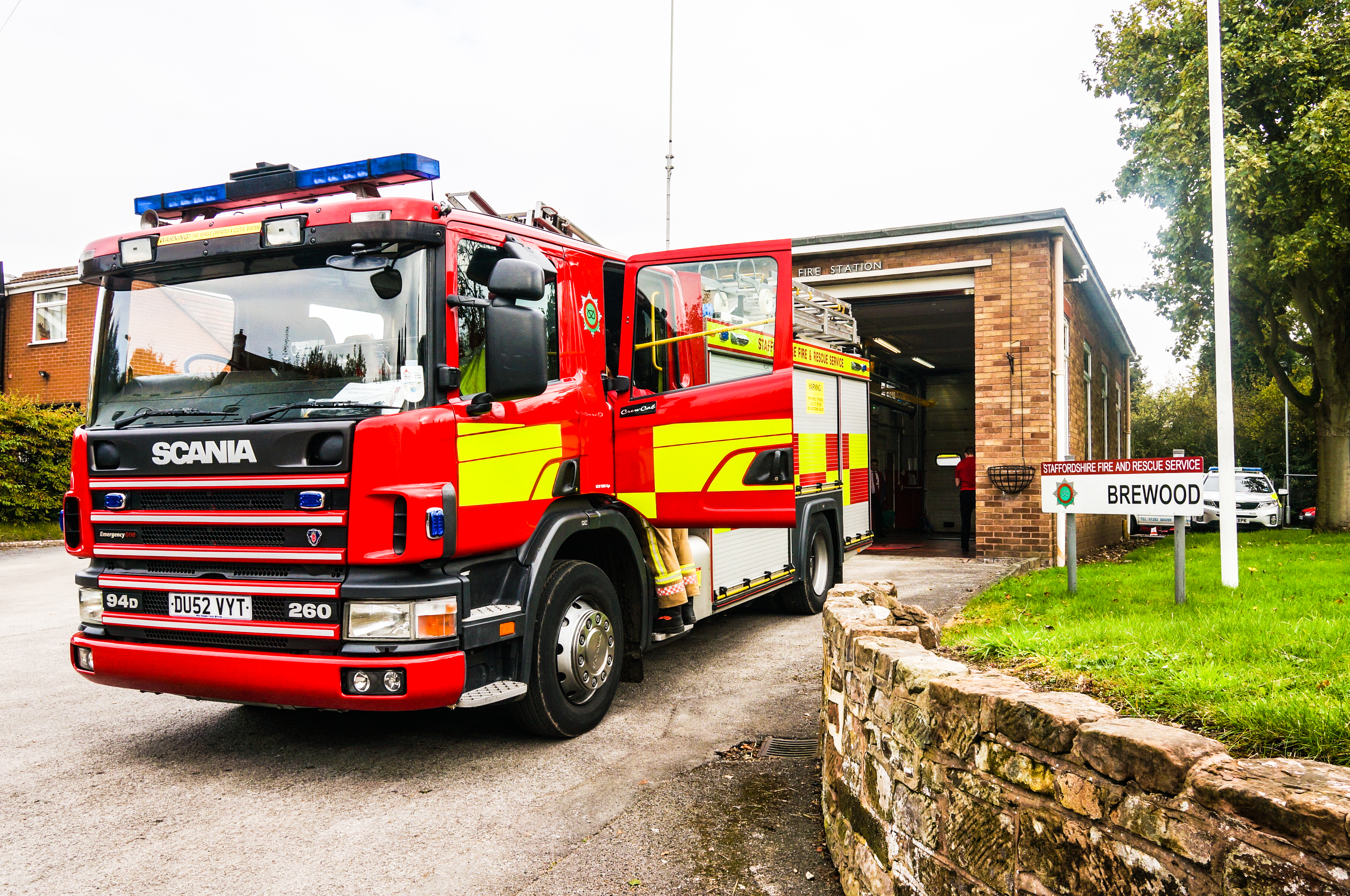
A Staffordshire Fire and Rescue Service appliance outside Brewood Fire Station in October 2015

The Shropshire Union Canal passes through the western edge of Brewood (and over Stretton Aqueduct). The River Penk flows along the eastern edge. Belvide Reservoir, which feeds the canal, is about one kilometre to the north-west.

There is a Brewood Civic Society and a Rotary Club of Brewood. Brewood is also the home of the Brewood Singers. The village came second in the South Staffordshire Best Kept Village 2005 challenge and has won the competition numerous times.

Brewood is also home to the annual Brewood Cycle Challenge a popular cycle sportive taking place each June and the Brewood 10K Run each September.

== Notable people ==
- John Giffard (1534–1613), landowner from Chillington Hall and MP for Lichfield
- Jeremiah Smith (1771–1854), an English cleric, High Master of Manchester Grammar School.
- Thomas A. Walker (1828–1889), an English civil engineering contractor.
- Don Freshwater (1924–2004), a British professor of chemical engineering.
- Jim Lea (born 1949), played bass guitar, keyboards and piano for Slade, lives locally.
- John McAlle (born 1950), former footballer with 483 club caps, (407 for Wolves) lives in Brewood
- Martin Gilks (1965–2006), drummer of the British pop band The Wonder Stuff, grew up in Brewood.
- Siân Reeves (born 1966), British actress, played Sydney Henshall in the TV drama Cutting It, grew up in Brewood.

== Education ==
Brewood has four schools:

- St Mary & St Chad C of E First School
- Brewood Middle School, originally Brewood Grammar School
- St Mary's Catholic Primary School
- St Dominic's Grammar School

== Churches ==
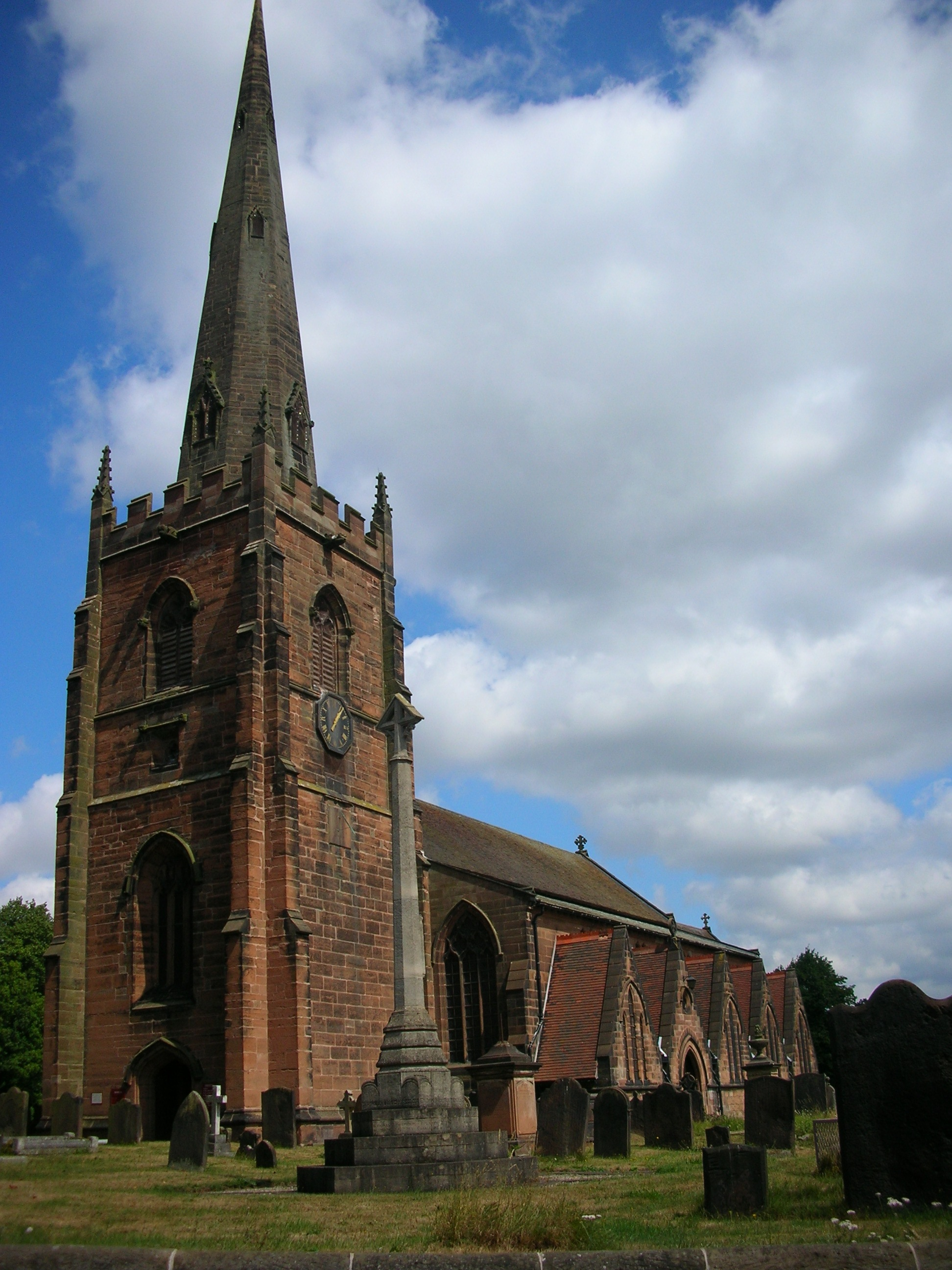
Brewood CE Church of St Mary & St Chad

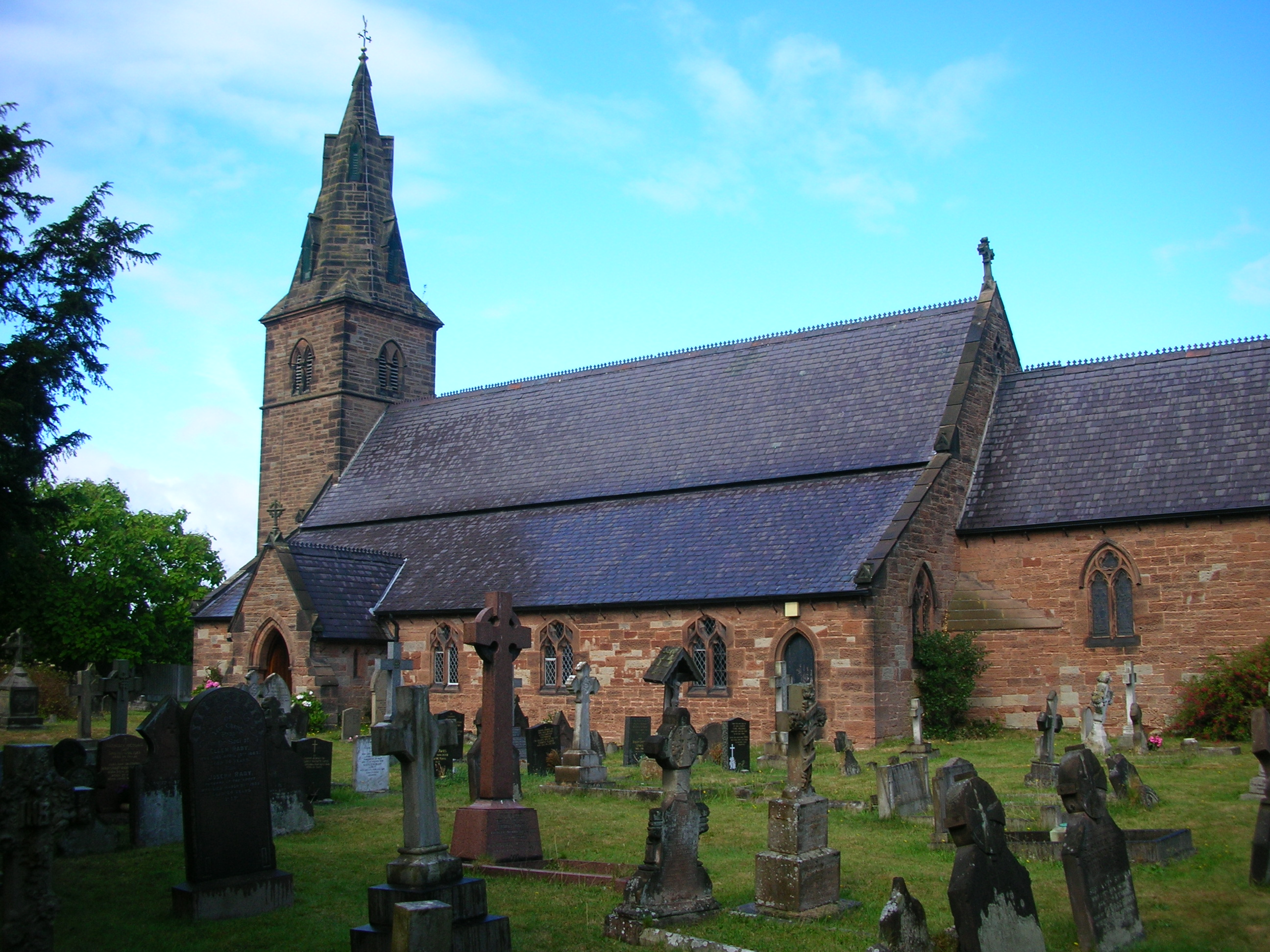
St Mary's Roman Catholic church

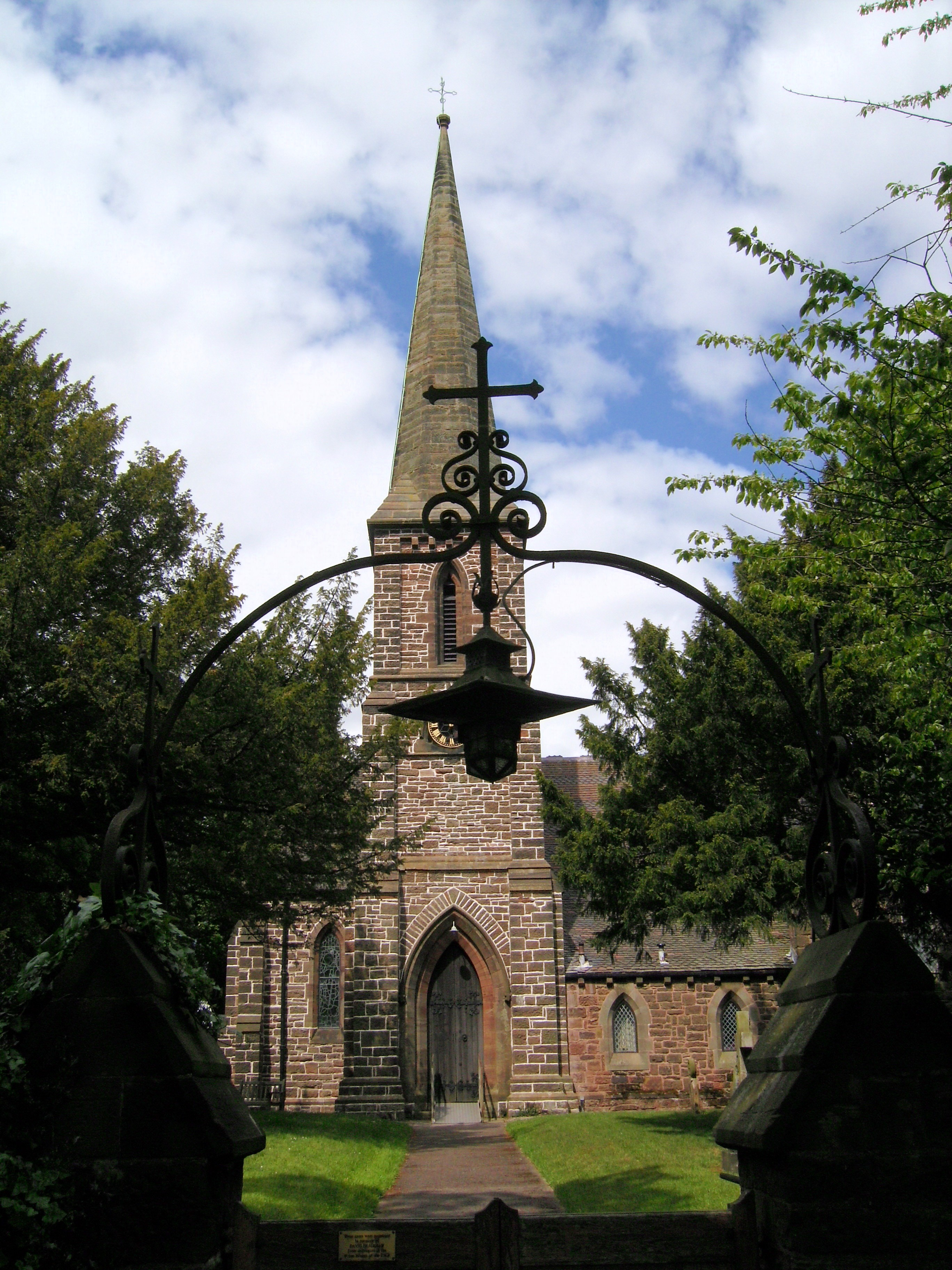
St. John the Evangelist, Bishops Wood

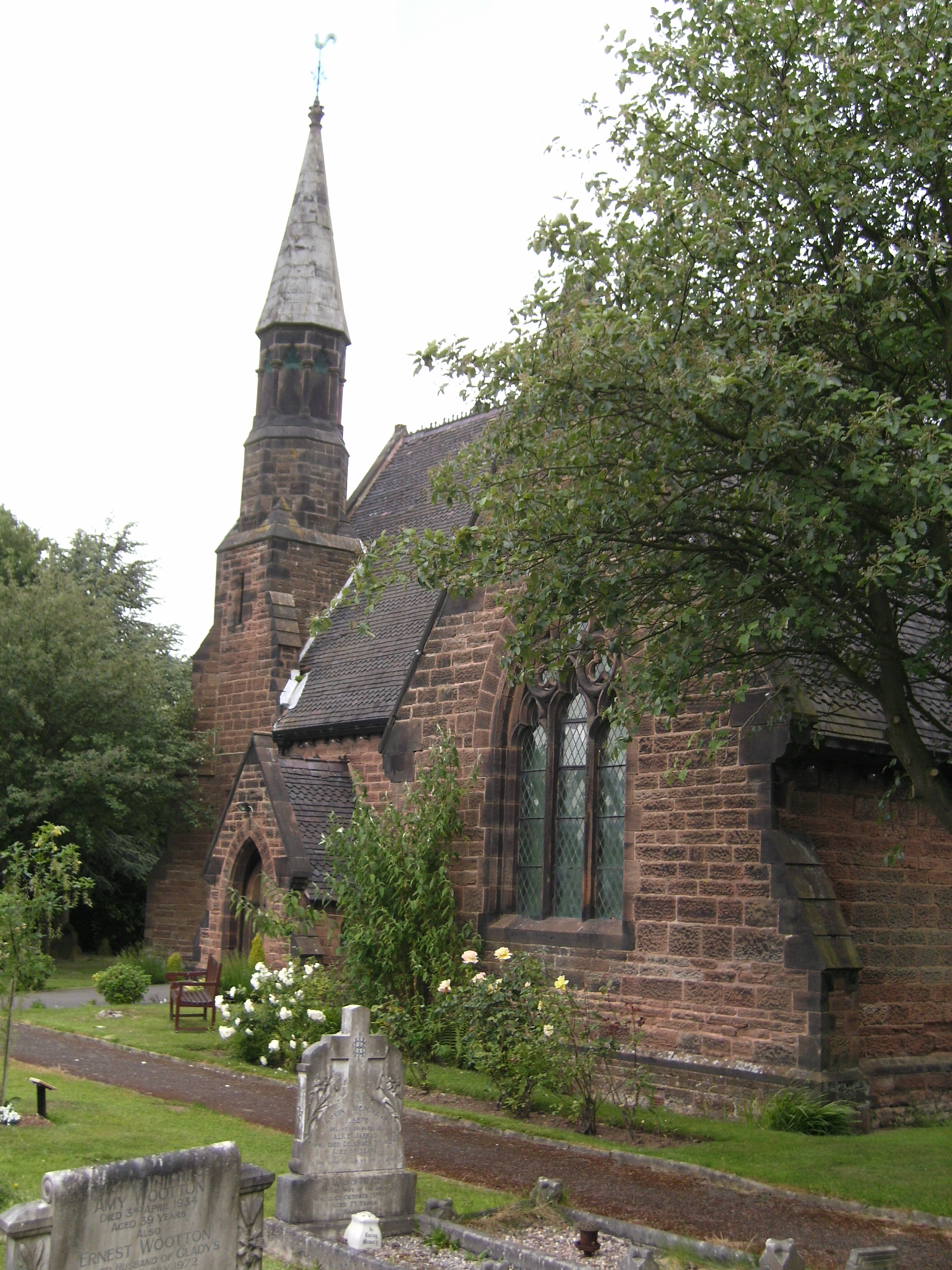
St Paul's church, Coven

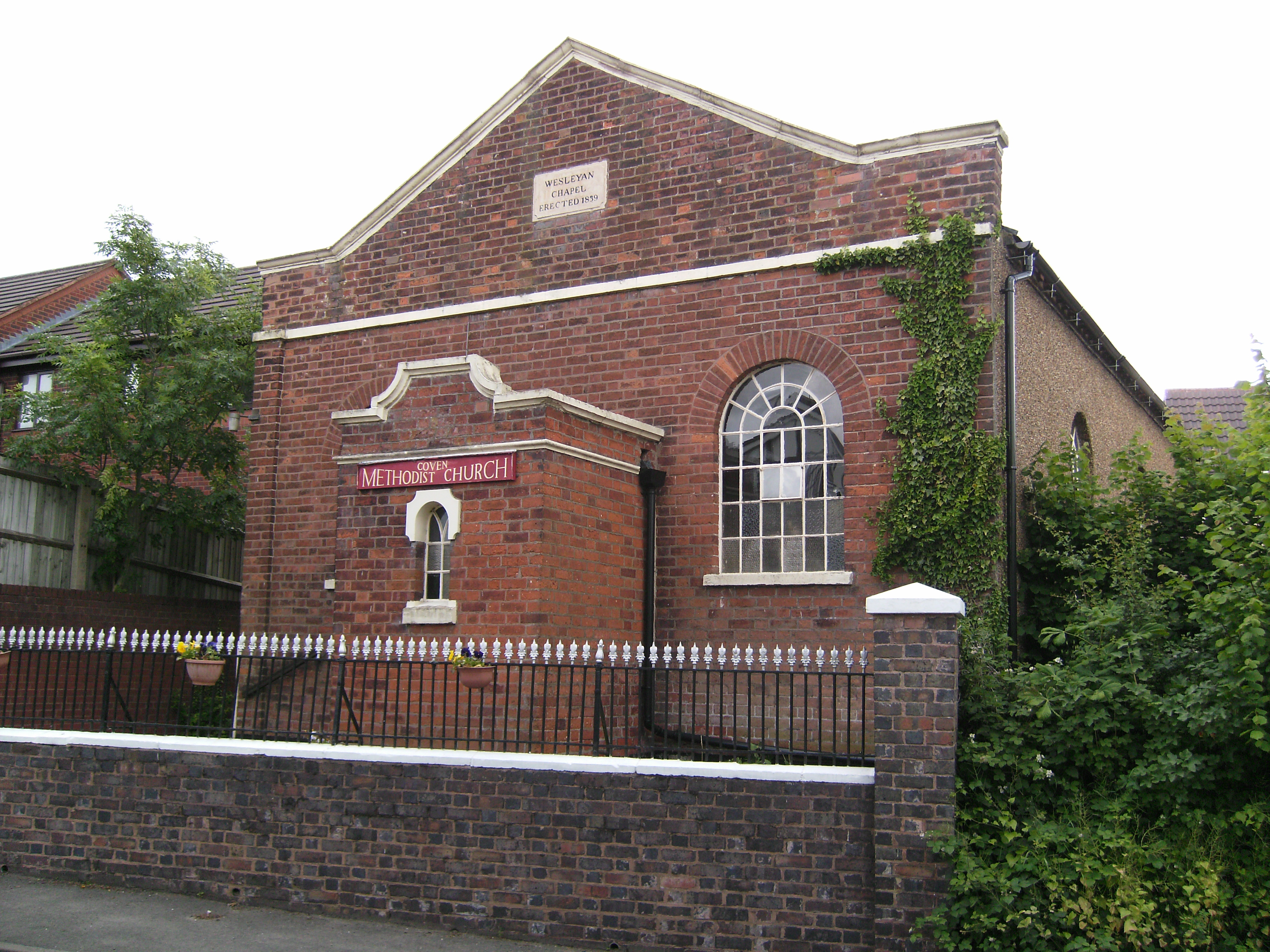
Coven Methodist church, formerly a Wesleyan chapel, the oldest surviving nonconformist church in the area

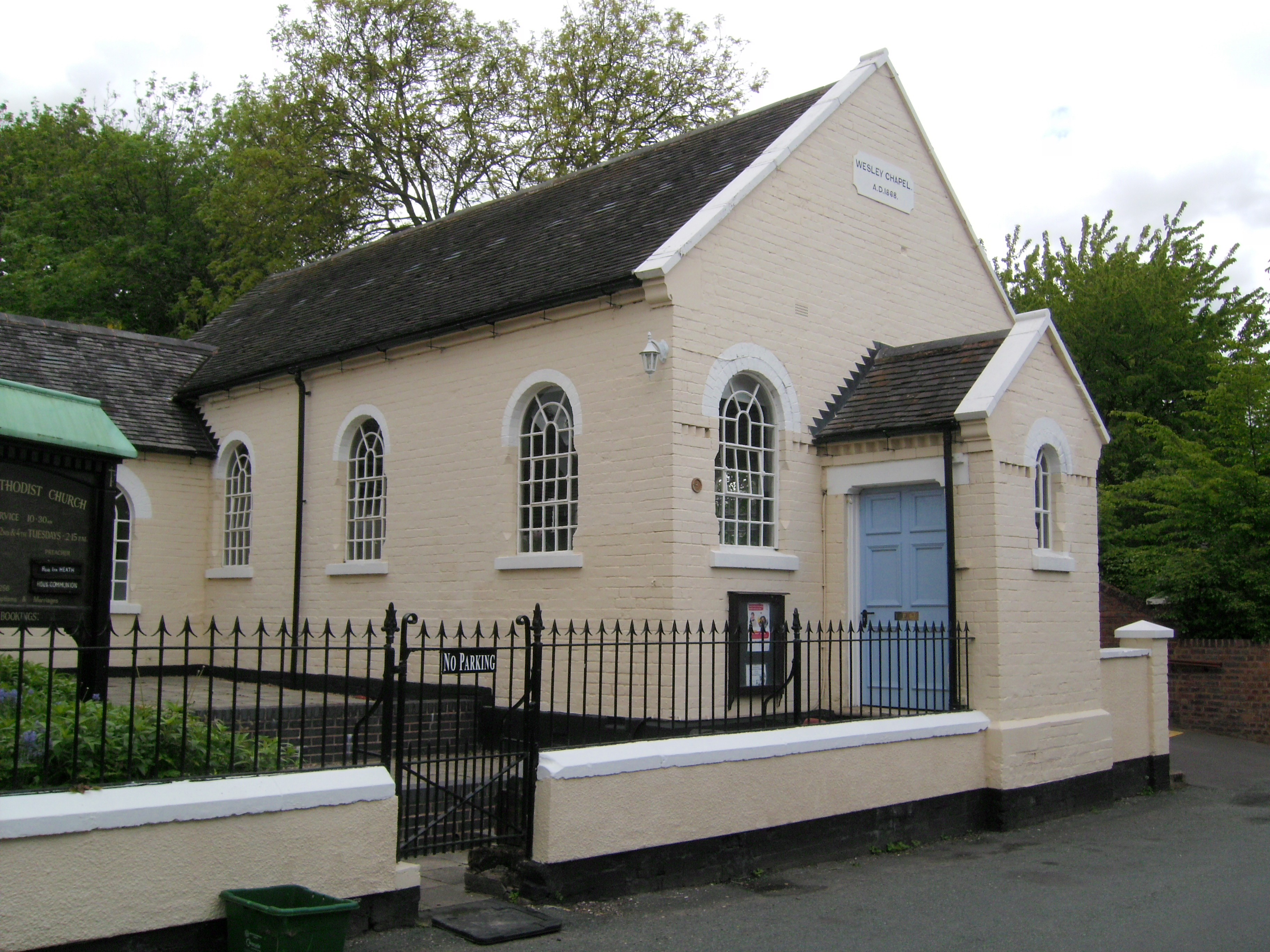
The 1868 Wesleyan chapel at Brewood, still a Methodist church

St Mary and St Chad's Church, Brewood, is Brewood's local parish church.

=== Victorian Gothic Churches ===
Three examples of Gothic Revival church building are to be found in the Brewood area.

- St Mary's Roman Catholic Church, Brewood, which was designed by Pugin.
- The Anglican church at nearby Bishops Wood is dedicated to St. John the Evangelist. The church was designed by George Thomas Robinson of Wolverhampton, who was regarded as a maverick architect, although this is regarded as one of his most successful buildings. Built 1848–1850 and consecrated in 1851, it has a notable crossing beneath an open roof. Surrounded by monuments to local families, it has windows dedicated to several members of the Evans family, who lived at Boscobel and played a large part in developing Bishops Wood.
- St Paul's Church, Coven, a grade II listed parish church.

=== Protestant Nonconformity ===
The oldest surviving purpose-built meeting places for Protestant nonconformists are Wesleyan in origin, although there were significant Congregationalist and Primitive Methodist groups in Brewood during the 19th century. A small Wesleyan chapel was opened at Coven in 1828, and in 1839 replaced by a larger structure in Lawn Lane, now Coven's Methodist church. At Brewood, a small brick chapel was opened in 1868. With pitched roof and round-arched windows, it is typical of its time: now extended considerably and painted white, it still serves as Brewood Methodist Church.

== See also ==
- Listed buildings in Brewood and Coven
