= Humphrey Swynnerton =

Member of the Parliament of England

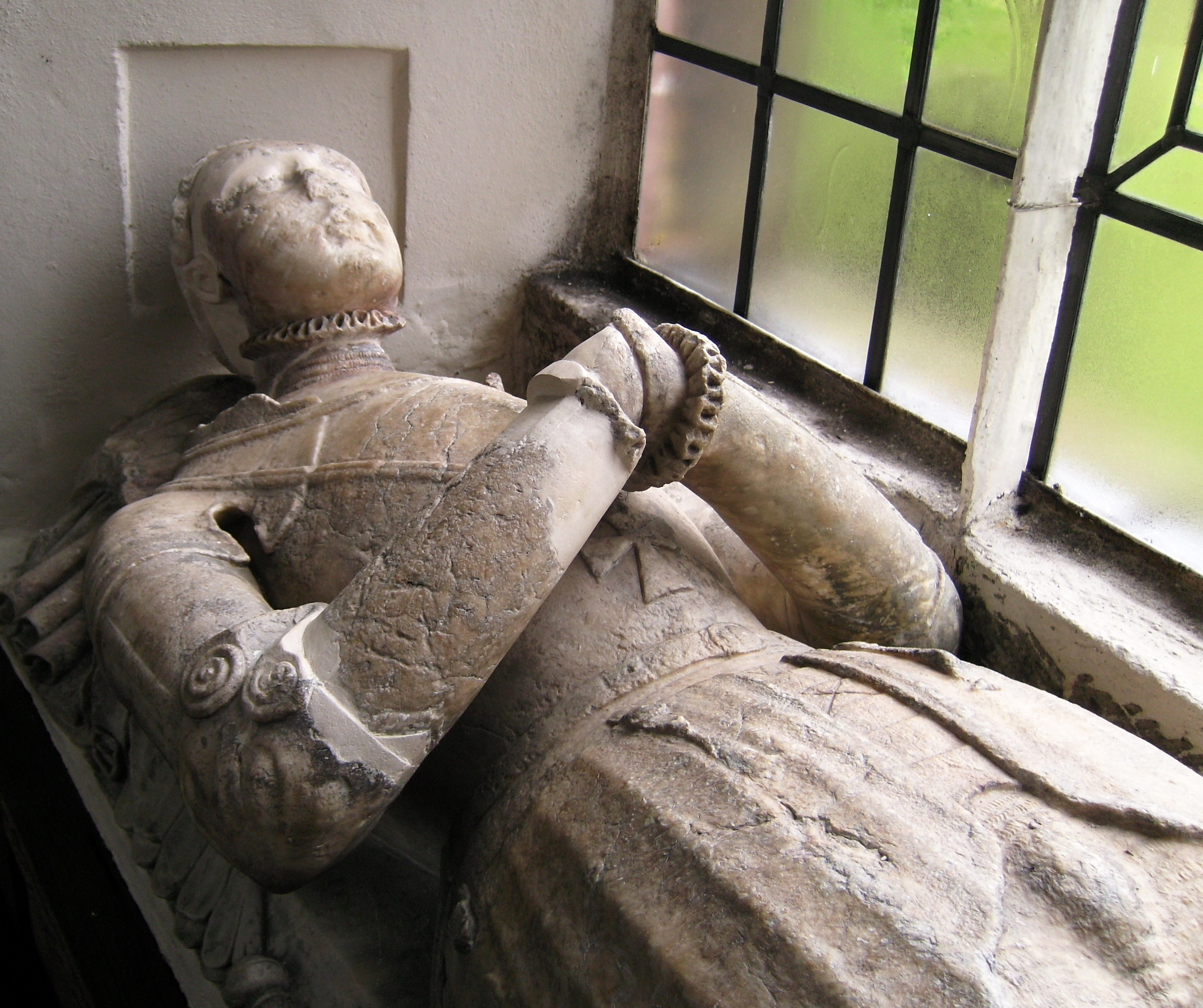
Humphrey Swynnerton, according to an effigy in Shareshill parish church, where he was buried.

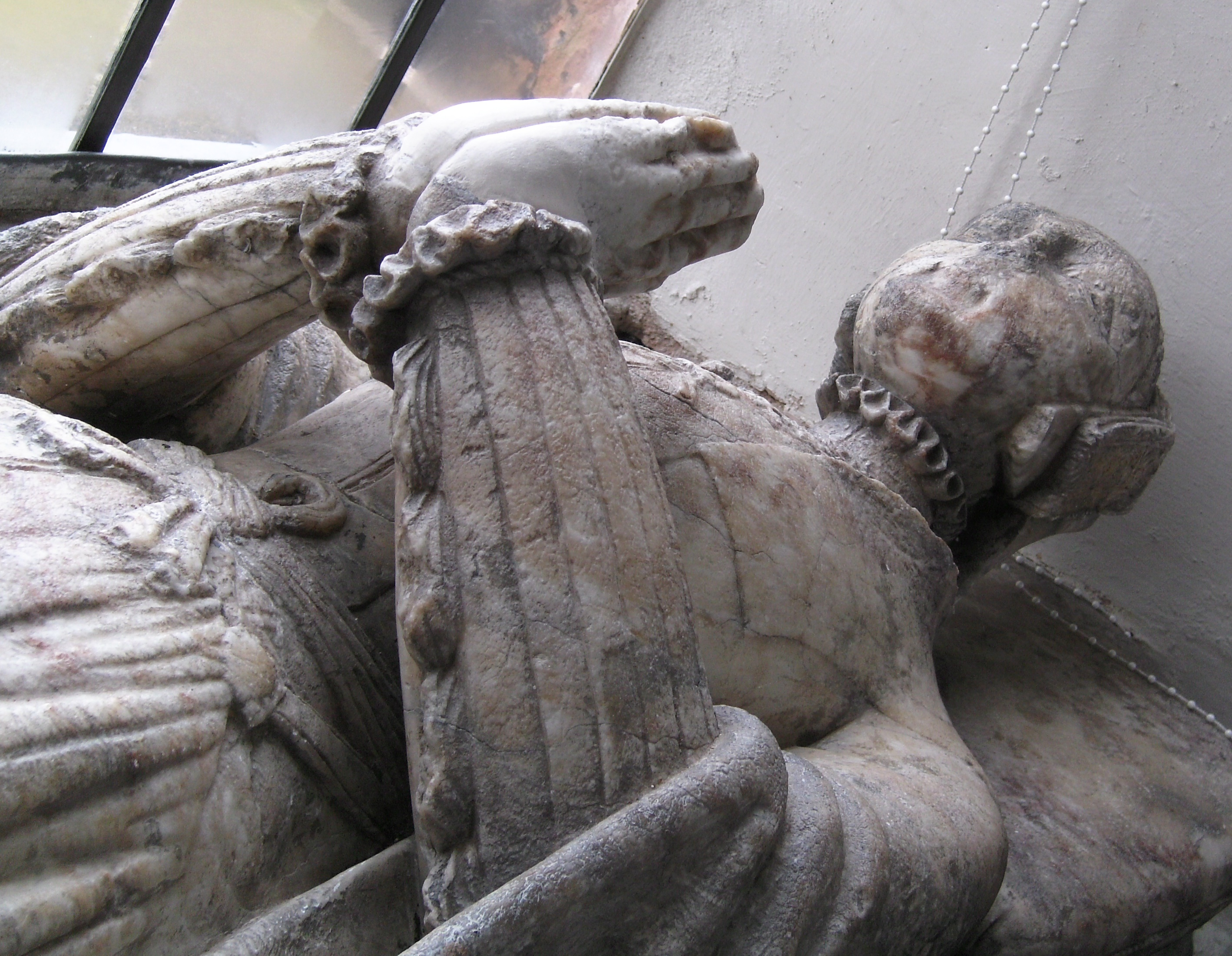
Cassandra Giffard, Swynnerton's wife: an effigy at Shareshill, formerly part of their tomb.

Humphrey Swynnerton (c. 1516 – 1562) was a Staffordshire landowner, a Member of the English Parliament and an Elizabethan recusant.

== Background and early life ==
Swynnerton's father was Thomas Swynnerton of Swynnerton Hall and Hilton Hall, Staffordshire. His mother was Alice Stanley, daughter of Sir Humphrey Stanley of Pipe Ridware and Clifton Campville.

Both his parents were from landed gentry families based in the southern half of Staffordshire. Of his grandparents, the most distinguished was Sir Humphrey Stanley, who was knighted by Henry VII after the Battle of Bosworth and made a banneret after the Battle of Stoke Field. A close associate of the king, he is buried in Westminster Abbey.

In 1537, Swynnerton became bailiff of the Black Ladies estate, near Brewood, a small Benedictine nunnery dissolved by the Dissolution of the Lesser Monasteries Act. The new owner was Thomas Giffard, who outmanoeuvred Edward Littleton of Pillaton Hall, the husband of Humphrey's aunt Helen Swynnerton to get it. By 1540 Humphrey married Thomas Giffard's sister, Cassandra.

== Landowner ==
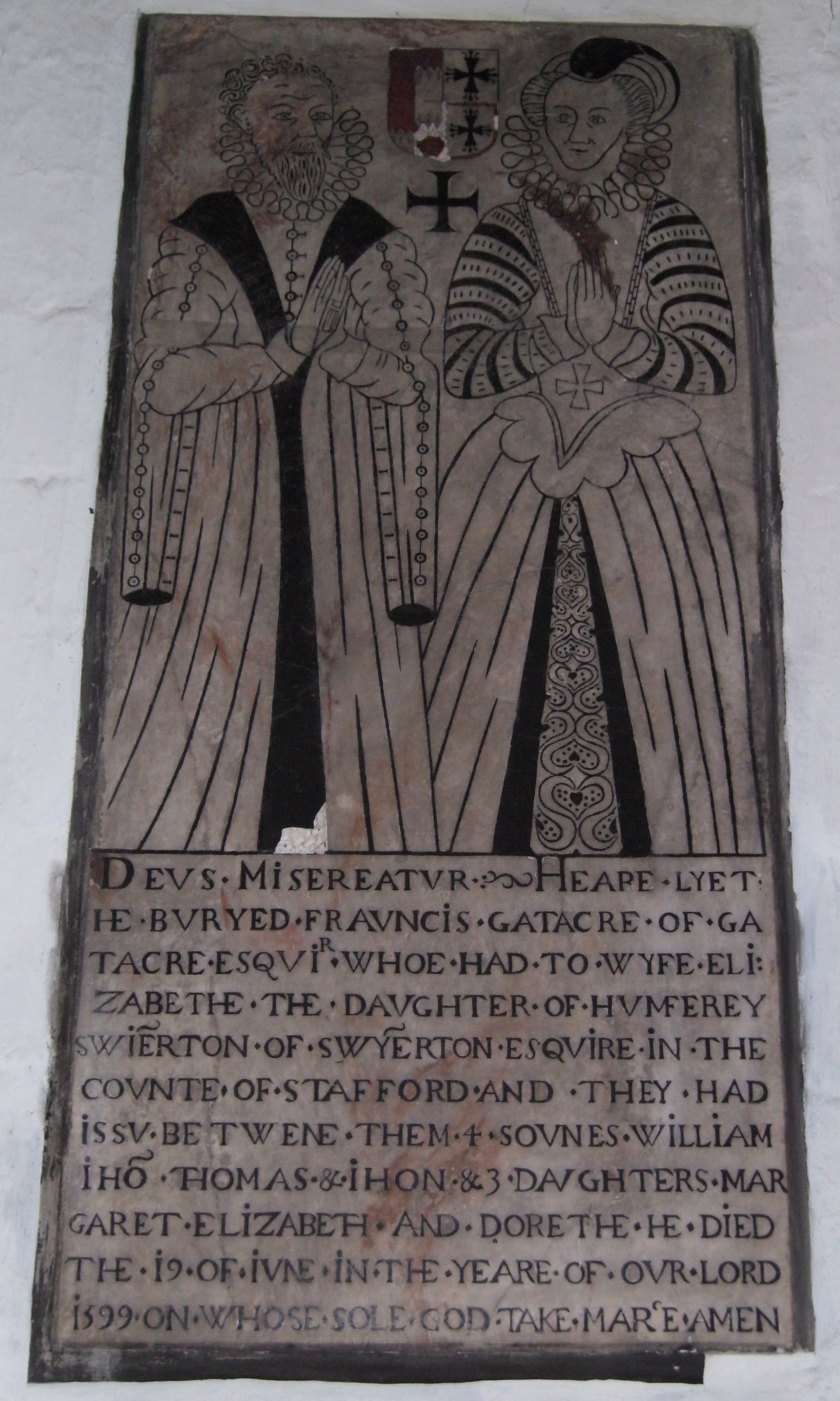
Tombstone of Francis Gatacre and Elizabeth Swynnerton, now mounted on wall of All Saints church, Claverley, Shropshire. Swynnerton's daughters were his heirs and Elizabeth conveyed the Swynnerton estate to the Fitzherbert family at her first marriage. Widowed young in 1559, she then married Gatacre, who lived until 1599.

About 1541, shortly after marrying Cassandra Giffard, Swynnerton inherited the family estates on the death of his father. They fell into two quite distinct parts. Swynnerton, which had been in the family longest, is near Stone, Staffordshire. Hilton is about 30 km (20 miles) to the south, close to Wolverhampton. The family had also had an interest in the Littel Saredon estate in Shareshill, close to Hilton, possibly still did. Even further afield, there were also lands at Barrow, Cheshire. Swynnerton clearly found this dispersal uneconomic.

Ownership of the Cheshire lands was disputed by Sir John Savage and, in 1555, Swynnerton came to an agreement and sold them to him. However, he divided his time between Hilton and Swynnerton, treating both as home. Hilton was assessed in 1545 as being worth only £20 annually.

In addition to his estates, Swynnerton drew incomes from other posts, which belonged to his father before him. He became steward of the Royal Forest of Cannock in 1541, and in 1559–60 was escheator for Staffordshire.

== Member of Parliament ==
Swynnerton served as Member of Parliament for the borough of Stafford in the second parliament of Queen Mary's reign, which assembled in April 1554. The influence of the Giffards, now at the height of their power in the county, must have secured him the seat. In the electoral indenture, completed in Latin, he was placed second in order of precedence, with the 21-year-old John Giffard as his senior. The returning officer was the High Sheriff of Staffordshire, Thomas Giffard, his own brother-in-law and John Giffard's father.

Swynnerton shared the Giffards' religious conservatism and can only have welcomed the restoration of Catholicism by Mary.

However, the parliament to which he was elected was mainly concerned with the queen's marriage to Philip II of Spain. It passed an act validating the marriage treaty, already negotiated by Mary and her ministers. Its other major act recognised Mary as queen regnant, with the same powers as a king. The business was over in a month and the parliament was dissolved. Swynnerton never served again as MP.

== Recusant ==
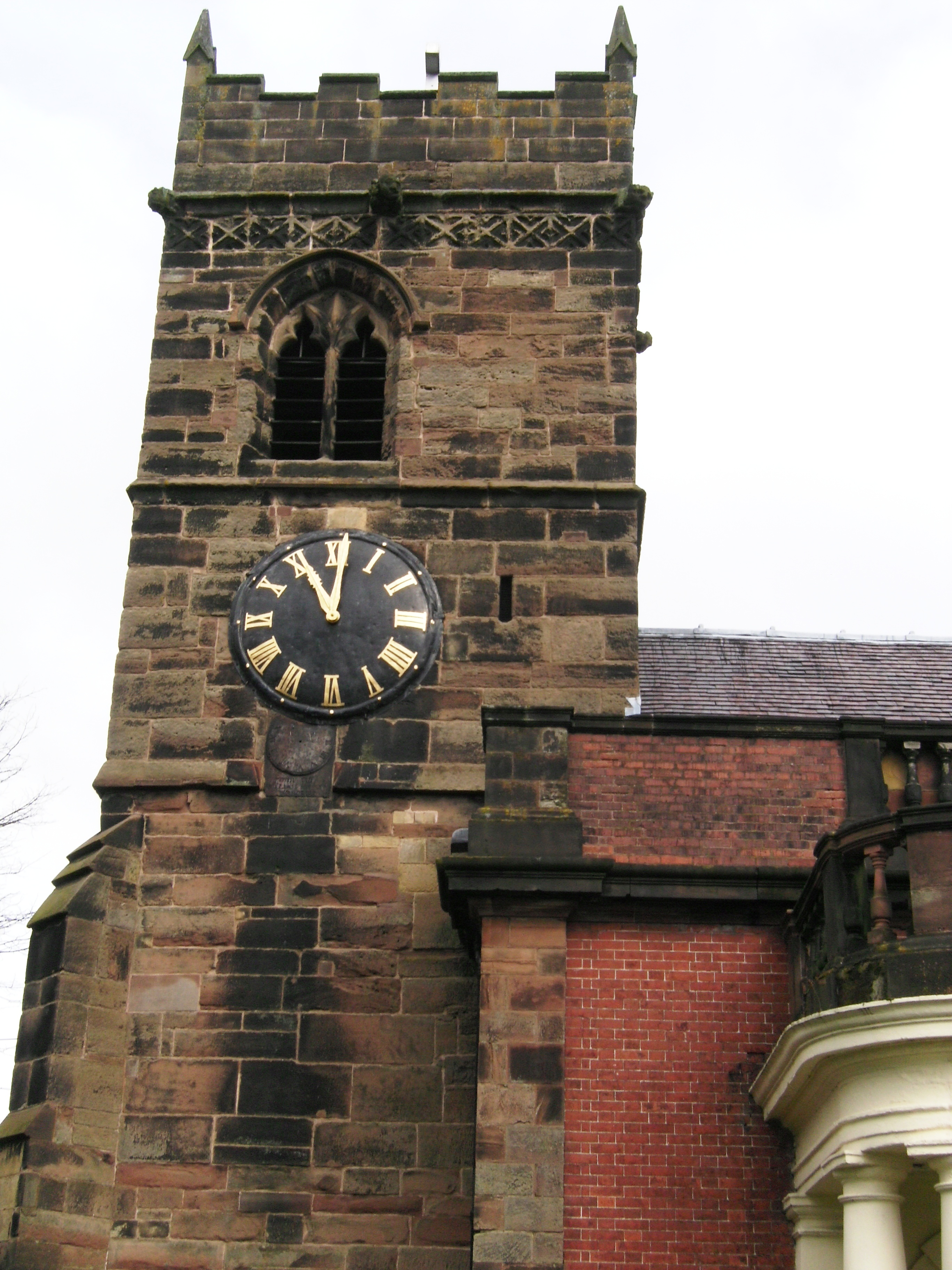
Bell tower of the Church of St Mary and St Luke, Shareshill. This embodies restoration and rebuilding work carried out by Swynnerton near the end of his life. The nave and chancel are Georgian.

Swynnerton's religious conservatism had led him to preserve and keep a large breviary when Lichfield Cathedral was compelled to dispose of its treasures under Edward VI. Mary restored Catholic worship (though not, at that point, the link with the Papacy) through her first parliament in 1553, and in October the chapter took stock of what was needed and found that the only breviaries they could obtain were Swynnerton's, which he gave back, and a damaged one from Sir Thomas Fitzherbert, his son-in-law's brother. Swynnerton almost certainly supported the Marian restoration of Catholicism in its entirety.

When Elizabeth I came to the throne in November 1558, she immediately called a parliament to pass the Act of Superemacy, establishing herself as Supreme Governor of the Church of England and the Church of England as avowedly Protestant. This faced Catholics like Swynnerton with a clear choice between continuing to hope for a Catholic revival within the church or breaking with it to become a separate community. The dissenting or recusant group were distinguished by taking advantage of the general pardon issued by Elizabeth at her coronation on 15 January 1558. In common with Thomas Giffard, Swynnerton sued for pardon.

Swynnerton's last months were devoted mainly to the rebuilding of the church of St Mary and St John at Shareshill. Originally a chapel of ease of the important collegiate church of St Michael at Penkridge, it had been given its independence in 1551, after the dissolution of the chantries eliminated the college and the vicar of St Michael's conceded the right to carry out burials. It was Swynnerton's parish church when he was resident in Hilton, and it seems to have been in need of repair and enlargement. The medieval building was largely replaced at his cost, close to the end of his life, in 1562.

Swynnerton made his will on 6 July 1561. If he were to die at Swynnerton, he asked for burial in the lady chapel before the former location of the madonna. If he were to die at Hilton he asked to be buried in the chancel of Shareshill church, where the image of St Luke had stood. He left 3s.4d. to the chapter at Wolverhampton to pray for his soul. His estates he divided between his daughters, having no sons. He left rings to his sons-in-law, Francis Gatacre and Henry Vernon.

He died on 25 August 1562 at Hilton, and was buried, in accordance with his wishes, at Shareshill. His wife was buried next to him on 7 January 1570. An impressive tomb with alabaster effigies was built. The effigies, although damaged, survive and are today located on internal window sills of the church.

== Marriage and family ==
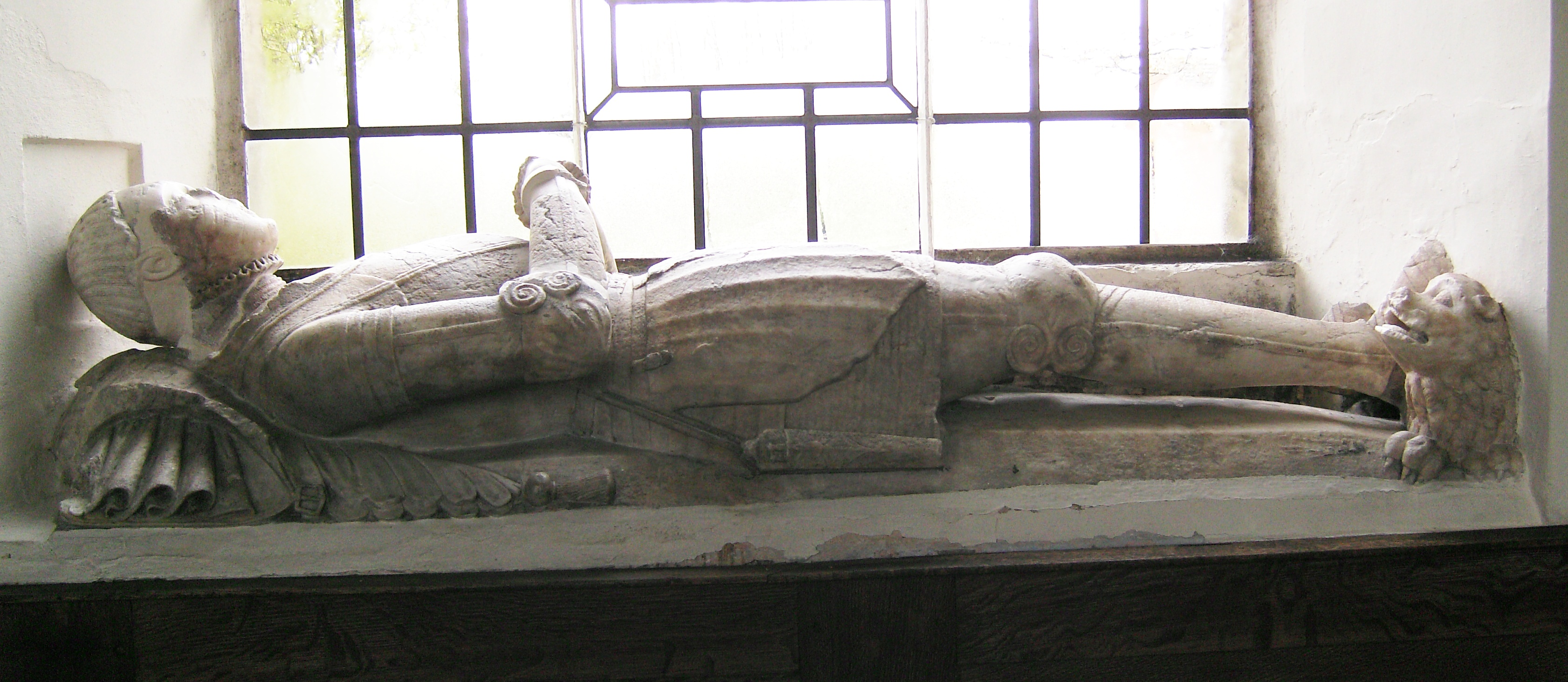
Effigy of Humphrey Swynnerton in a window on the northern side of the chancel at Shareshill.

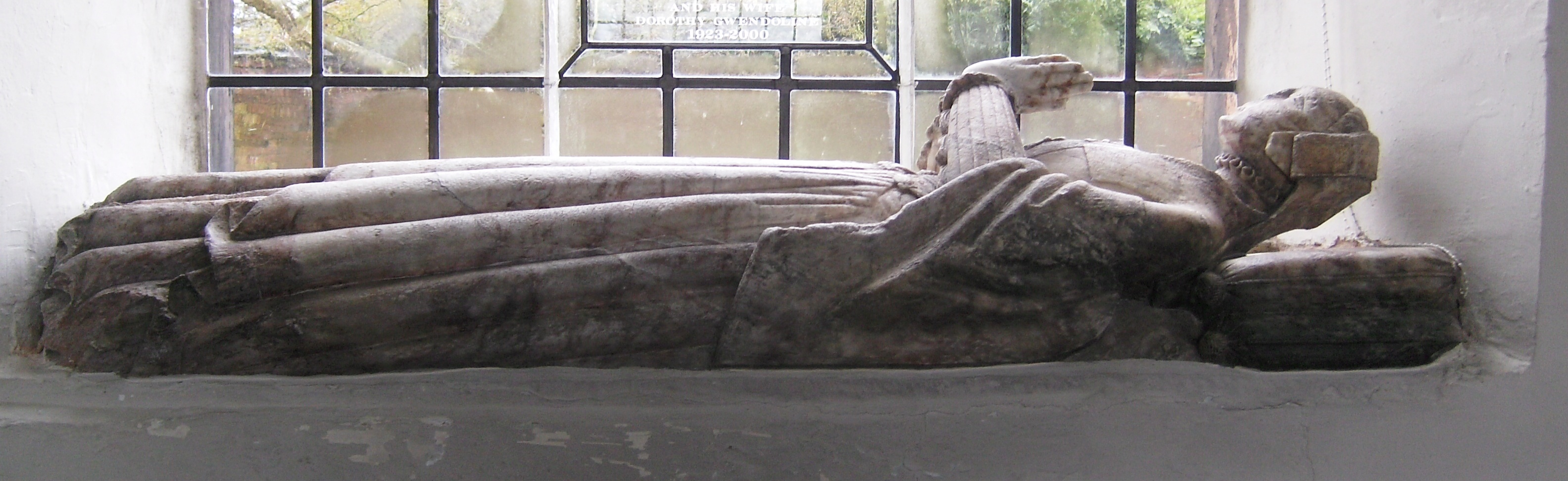
Cassandra Giffard's effigy, facing her husband's at Shareshill.

Some time before 1540, Swynnerton married Cassandra Giffard, daughter of Sir John Giffard of Chillington. They had two daughters, who were his co-heirs:

- Elizabeth Swynnerton married William Fitzherbert, son of the eminent jurist Sir Anthony Fitzherbert, and member of an important Derbyshire landowning family that remained largely Catholic. She took with her the family estate of Swynnerton, which was pledged to the Fitzherberts, and ultimately went to them, even though William died in 1558 or 1559. Elizabeth then married Francis Gatacre of Claverley. She survived until 1606.

- Margaret Swynnerton married Henry Vernon of Sudbury Hall, member of another important Derbyshire recusant family, in 1547. She was allotted Hilton, which thus became part of the Vernon estates. These she seems to have defended with great vigour, as she was accused of falsifying her husband's will to prevent dissipation of the property.
