= John Giffard (died 1613) =

Member of the Parliament of England

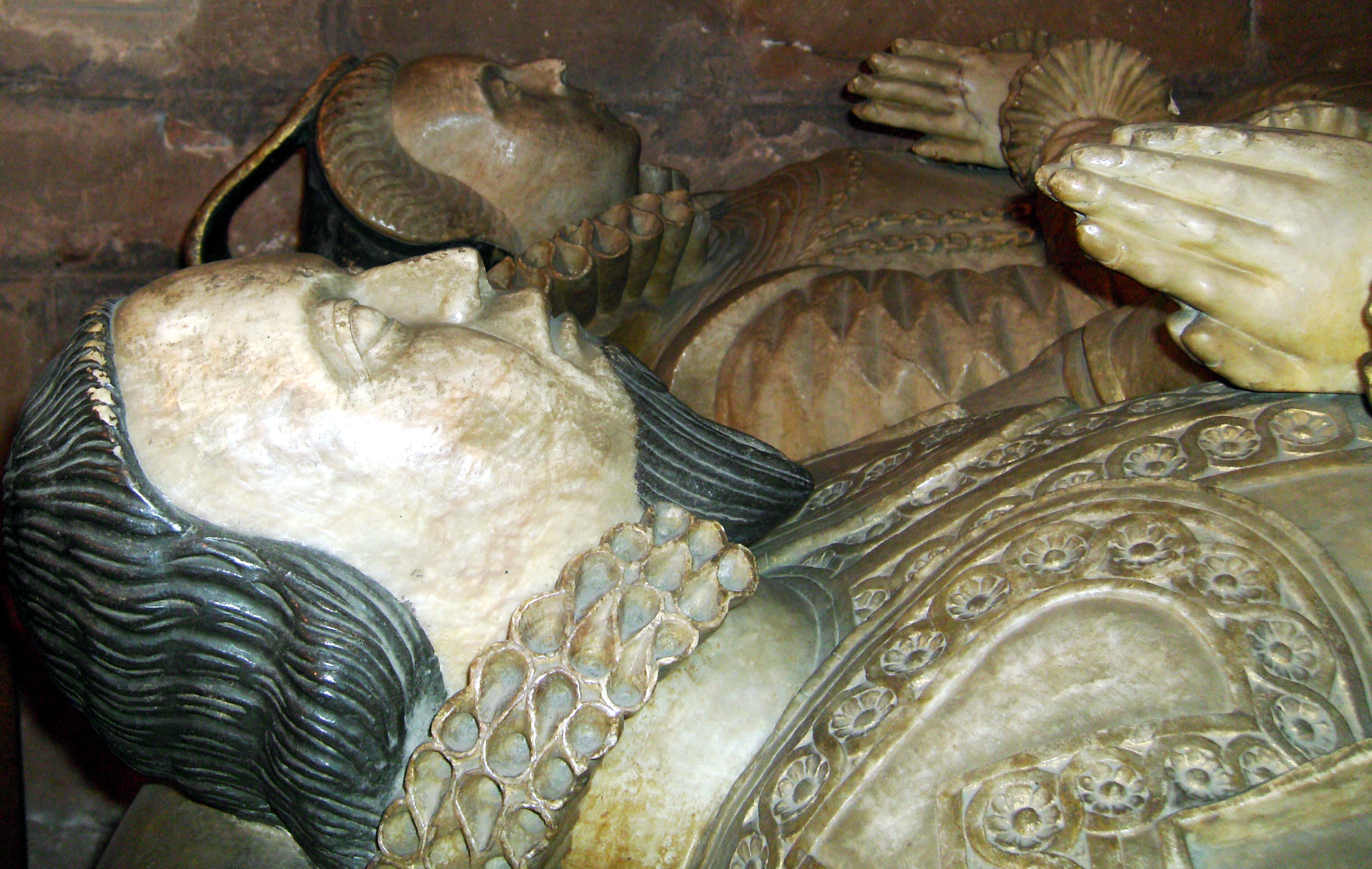
John Giffard and his wife, Joyce Leveson. The son of Sir Thomas, John was fined and imprisoned for Recusancy under Elizabeth.

John Giffard (1534–1613) was a Staffordshire landowner and Member of the English Parliament, notable as a leader of Roman Catholic Recusancy in the reigns of Elizabeth I and James I.

== Background and early life ==
John Giffard's father was Sir Thomas Giffard of Caverswall Castle. The Giffards had their seat at Chillington Hall, near Brewood, from the late 12th century. Sir Thomas, like his father, Sir John Giffard, had considerably expanded the family estates until they were the wealthiest landed gentry family in Staffordshire. Sir John was still alive when his grandson John was born, so Thomas Giffard was living at Caverswall, which he had acquired through his first wife, the heiress Dorothy Montgomery. Both Sir John and Sir Thomas were MPs of religiously conservative disposition, although both had generally acquiesced in the legislation that carried through the English Reformation.

John Giffard's mother was Ursula Throckmorton, daughter of Robert Throckmorton of Coughton Court, Warwickshire, and Elizabeth Baynham. She was Thomas Giffard's second wife: Dorothy had died by 1529, leaving Thomas with a daughter, but no surviving sons. He married Ursula in 1529. She was part of a wealthy landowning family, generally of a similar religious conservative outlook to the Giffards. Her brother, George Throckmorton, was MP for Warwickshire in the English Reformation Parliament, elected in 1529. His sympathies were strongly Catholic and he was arrested in 1537, in the aftermath of the Pilgrimage of Grace, with which he was thought to sympathise. He made a rambling and confused confession of his part in the Catholic opposition, narrowly escaping with his life.

In 1539, when John was still a child, Thomas Giffard bought the site of Black Ladies Priory, a dissolved Benedictine nunnery near Brewood. Shortly after, the family moved into the house, which Thomas had rebuilt as fine Tudor brick residence, set on a moated site, with fishponds. At about the age of 16, John Giffard married Joyce Leveson, and their first child, Walter, was born about a year into the marriage. By the age of 21, he was considered ready for parliament.

== Parliamentary career ==
John Giffard was first elected to as Member of Parliament for Lichfield in the first parliament of Queen Mary I's reign, opened on 5 October 1553, four days after her coronation. Lichfield had been a parliamentary constituency in the Middle Ages, but had lost the right to elect MPs, only regaining it in 1547, after a gap of almost two hundred years. The main influence on the selection of MPs was William Paget, 1st Baron Paget, who had been a close supporter of the regime of the Protector Somerset. Humiliated at Somerset's fall, he was one of the Privy Councillors who escaped from custody to recognise Mary as Queen during the succession crisis of summer 1553. He ensured that Lichfield returned MPs he could rely on. Giffard's senior colleague was Sir Philip Draycott, a friend of Paget who had shared his political fortunes. Giffard himself was an obvious supporter of the Catholic Queen, with excellent connections in Staffordshire and neighbouring counties.

Giffard was able to travel up to London with his father, Thomas, who was elected to the same parliament as member for Staffordshire. Mary's first parliament legislated for a return to Catholic practice in the churches, reversing the reforms of Edward VI's reign to return the situation to that at the end of Henry VIII's. It did not restore links with the Papacy, and it set landowners minds at rest by leaving the monasteries and chantries dissolved. The Giffards accepted these measures, which were fully in line with their own beliefs. The parliament lasted just two months and the members were home for Christmas.

Giffard was also elected to the next parliament, which assembled in April 1554. This time he represented the borough of Stafford. This time he was returned first in order of precedence, with Humphrey Swynnerton, husband of his aunt Cassandra Giffard, as his colleague. Swynnerton was an intensely pious Catholic, who spent much of his limited wealth on rebuilding the church at Shareshill. Elections at Stafford took place among a small circle of burgesses, chaired by the bailiff. The returning officer at Stafford was the High Sheriff of Staffordshire, at that time Thomas Giffard himself, completing the indenture in Latin for his own son and brother-in-law.

This parliament was even shorter, lasting just a month. Its main business was to pass the Act for the Marriage of Queen Mary to Philip of Spain and the constitutionally important Act concerning Regal Power. The latter gave parliamentary authority to a queen regnant in England for the first time. Once again, there was no prospect of a Giffard opposing the queen's wishes.

== Landowner and recusant ==
John Giffard's father, Sir Thomas Giffard, did not inherit the family estates until 1556. He died only four years later, leaving John with very large holdings across the southern half of Staffordshire and in Derbyshire, although the focus remained Brewood parish, where the Giffards had their seat at Chillington. John's brother Humphrey was provided for by Sir Thomas, having Black Ladies for the rest of his life, with the reversion to John. In fact, Humphrey outlived John, and it was to Walter, his heir, that Black Ladies returned. With the family generally well-provided for, and the advantage still of youth, John's fortunes appeared assured, apart from the religious issue, which was to dog the Giffards for generations.

Initially, the accession of Elizabeth I in 1558 did not affect the Giffards greatly. The queen rapidly moved to reassert a Protestant monarchy and Church of England. However, there was no inquisition into Catholic's beliefs, only practice, and the authorities were long tolerant of offences of omission. Many who began as recusants gradually drifted into conformity. John did not succeed his father as justice of the peace until 1573, the same year he was pricked High Sheriff of Staffordshire. Both these offices required taking the Oath of Supremacy, swearing to accept the monarch as "the only supreme governor of this realm, and of all other her Highness's dominions and countries, as well in all spiritual or ecclesiastical things or causes, as temporal." Imposed by the Act of Supremacy 1558, failure to meet this requirement more than once had been turned into a treasonable offence by the Supremacy of the Crown Act 1562. In trusting him with public office, the regime was clearly signalling its wish to co-opt John Giffard into the county's ruling elite. His behaviour on that occasion probably gave rise to suspicion, but it was only two years later that matters took a serious turn for the worse.

Prayer book of 1559, which John Giffard was expected to use.

In 1575, the Queen visited Staffordshire and, on her progress through the county, stayed at Chillington early in August. Giffard promised to attend worship at the parish church, but Elizabeth herself noticed that he was not present, as he should have been according to the Act of Uniformity 1558, the other main pillar of the Elizabethan Religious Settlement. Just three days later he was summoned by the Privy Council to explain himself. He was interviewed by four bishops and then placed in the custody of Edmund Freke, the Bishop of Rochester, a particularly zealous heresy-hunter. However, Chillington needed work after the royal stay, so Giffard was soon granted leave to return there to reorder his home. Soon after, he was formally released from custody on condition that he attend church and use the Prayer Book even in his private chapel.

However, Giffard continued to avoid parish worship. As a result, his estates were sequestered by the Crown and he was placed under house arrest, confined to his own homes in London or at Chillington. The only exception to this regime was for licensed visits to the spa at King's Newnham, near Rugby, Warwickshire. Despite this treatment at the hands of the State, Giffard remained, in his own way, entirely loyal. In 1588, when the country was threatened by Spanish invasion, he took the oath of allegiance and sent men to serve in the army.

However, the main factor in mitigating Giffard's later treatment by the authorities was his son Gilbert's role in betraying the Babington Plot. Gilbert had gone to France in 1577, hoping to train for the Catholic priesthood. He became involved in a plot to assassinate Elizabeth I and install her Catholic cousin Mary, Queen of Scots on the throne. He thus linked up with Charles Paget, the son of Baron Paget, who was already a double agent working for Sir Francis Walsingham, head of the queen's intelligence operation. On his return to England, late in 1585, Giffard was arrested at Rye, East Sussex, and agreed to act as a double agent for Walsingham, taking the alias No. 4. His information and activities proved vital, allowing Walsingham to penetrate Mary's correspondence with the French ambassador. He subsequently went absent without leave and was arrested by the forces of the Catholic League in a Paris brothel, together with an English prostitute and a man who claimed to be a retainer of the Earl of Essex. Imprisoned for 20 years, he died during the siege of Paris in 1590. It is not certain what Gilbert's motives were. The authorities considered him "the most notable double, treble villain that ever lived." Nevertheless, attitudes to his family softened and the restrictions on John Giffard were relaxed in his later years.

However, the Giffard fortunes were damaged severely by the recusancy of John and his successors. He did what he could to dispose of his estates before his death, and made his will on 27 August 1613, paying off debts and leaving small bequests to servants. He died the following day and was buried in the Church of St Mary and St Chad in Brewood.

== Marriage and family ==
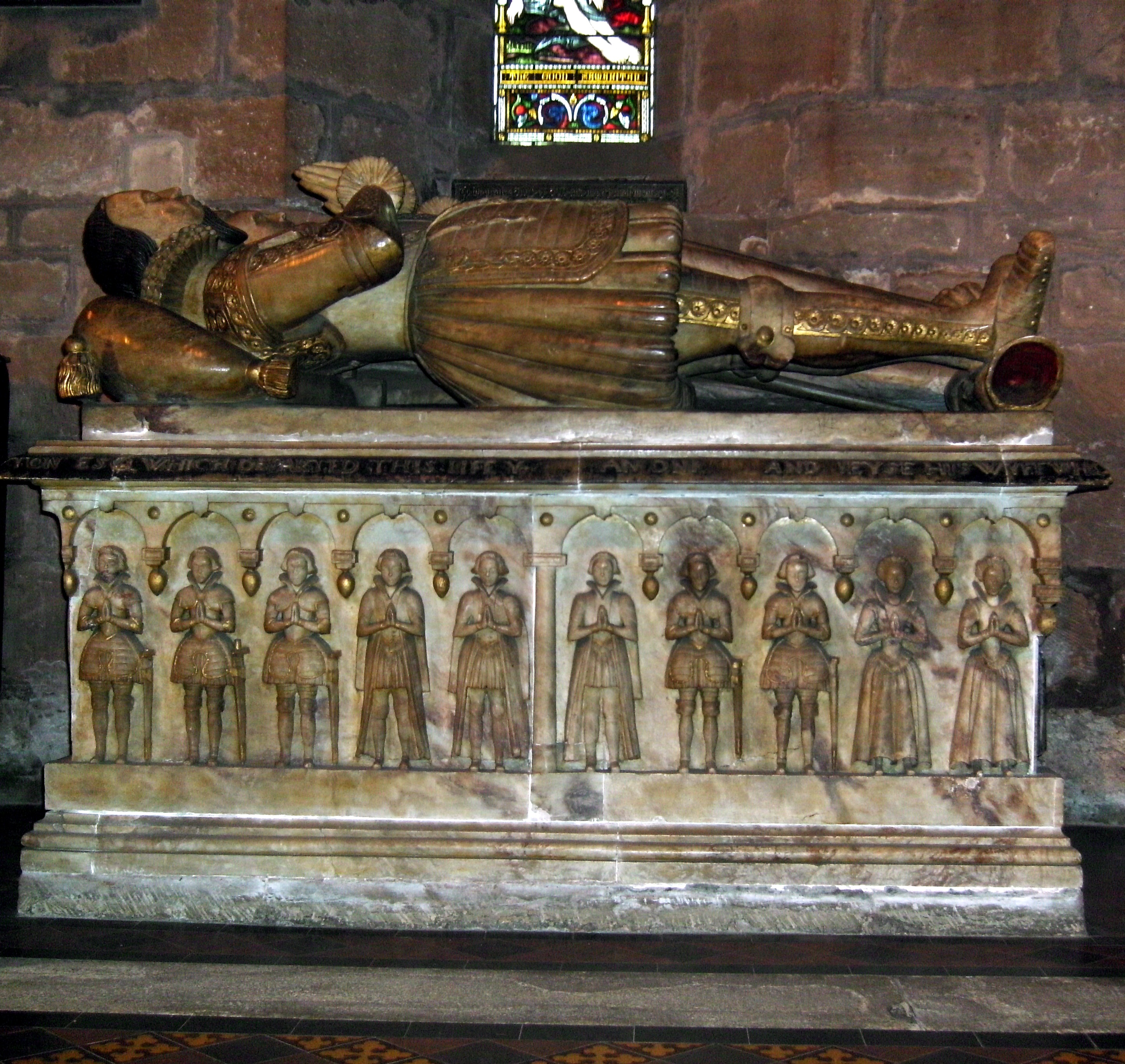
Tomb of John Gifard and Joyce Leveson, showing some of their children.

John Giffard married Joyce Leveson on 10 April 1550. she was the daughter of James Leveson of Lilleshall, a wealthy Wolverhampton businessman, one of the Merchants of the Staple who had the monopoly of wool exports from England. Leveson had made a fortune not only from trade but also from leasing the property of St Peter's Collegiate Church in Wolverhampton: in 1550, James's cousin John and Robert Brooke took on most of the college property at fixed low rents on perpetual leases – a ruse by the prebendaries to profit doubly from the dissolution of the institution. James Leveson had bought Lilleshall Abbey, a dissolved Augustinian house in Shropshire in 1539, and thereafter it became the seat of his branch of the Leveson family.

John Giffard and Joyce had at least 14 surviving children.

These included eight sons:

- Walter – John's heir and successor
- Richard
- Thomas
- Gilbert – the spy, who died in Paris, 1590
- Giles
- George – a priest, who died in 1585
- Gerard
- Edward

There were also six daughters:

- Mary – who married Robert Brooke of Lapley, Staffordshire
- Cassandra – who married Thomas Cassey, of Whitfield, Gloucestershire
- Ursula – who married John Wakeman, of Beckford, Gloucs.
- Frances – who married Edmund Powell, of Sandford, Oxfordshire
- Jane – who married Sir John Dormer, of Dorton, Oxfordshire
- Dorothy – who married Sir Walter Leveson, of Wolverhampton
