= Hilton Hall =

Building in Staffordshire, England

Coordinates: 52.6444°N 2.0724°W

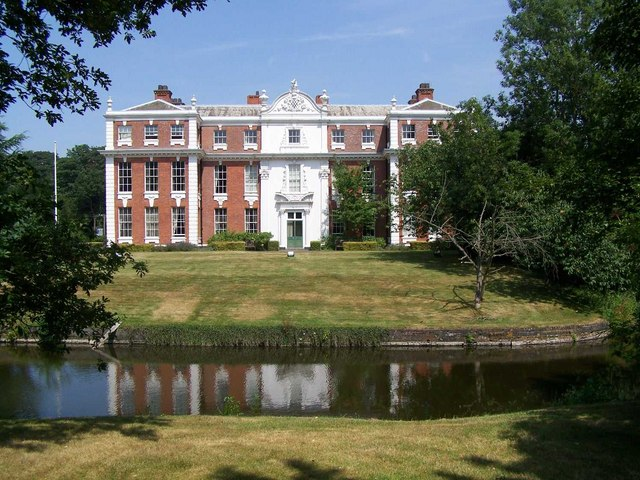
Hilton Hall

Hilton Hall is an 18th-century mansion house now in use as an Office and Business Centre at Hilton, near Wolverhampton, in Staffordshire. It is a Grade I listed building.

== History ==
The original manor house was commissioned by Sir Henry Swinnerton early in the 14th century. In 1547 the marriage of Margaret Swynnerton to Henry Vernon of Sudbury, Derbyshire took place: both were members of an important recusant families. The house and estate were inherited by Margaret in 1562, on the death of her father Humphrey Swynnerton, the deed being dated 8 May 1564, and incorporated into the Vernon estates on her death in 1587.

The house was altered, in early Georgian style, in the early 1720s by Henry Vernon, High Sheriff of Staffordshire. It was substantially extended in the early 1830s, when a third storey was added to the main building, skilfully replicating the Georgian design and raising the 1720s' pediment with its coat of arms to the higher level; the moat was partly filled in and a lower extension created at the rear of the main house for kitchens and service facilities. The main block has giant corner pilasters capped by urns.

The Vernon family erected an unusual hexagonal tower in the grounds, which they dedicated to the memory of Admiral Edward Vernon and his capture of Portobello, Panama from the Spanish in 1739. The monument is Grade II listed.

The family sold the estate in 1955 to Sidney Thomas Pickard who then sold Hilton Hall and a small portion of land in 1958 to the nuns of the Order of St Joseph of Bordeaux. The nuns sold the property in 1984 and between 1986 and 1999 it was occupied by Tarmac plc as a corporate headquarters. It is now a commercial office and business centre.

== See also ==
- List of Grade I listed buildings in Staffordshire
- Listed buildings in Hilton, Staffordshire
