= Listed buildings in Hilton, South Staffordshire =

Hilton is a civil parish in the district of South Staffordshire, Staffordshire, England. It contains five listed buildings that are recorded in the National Heritage List for England. Of these, two are listed at Grade I, the highest of the three grades, and the others are at Grade II, the lowest grade. The most important building in the parish is Hilton Hall, a country house which is listed at Grade I. All the other listed buildings in the parish are associated with the house, or are in its grounds

== Key ==
Grade	Criteria
I	Buildings of exceptional interest, sometimes considered to be internationally important
II	Buildings of national importance and special interest

== Buildings ==
Name and location	Photograph	Date	Notes	Grade
Hilton Hall; 52.64438°N 2.07241°W		Early 17th century	A country house that was extended in 1830. It is in red brick with stone and plaster dressings, it has a hipped slate roof, and is in provincial Baroque style. The house has a main block facing south of three storeys and eleven bays, and rear five-bay wings. It has a moulded plinth, giant corner pilasters topped by urns, and a dentilled and moulded cornice below the top floor. The middle five bays are recessed, and the centre bay is flanked by Corinthian pilasters, at the top are urns and a curved pediment containing garlands and an achievement. The doorway has engaged Corinthian columns, a fanlight, and an entablature with a keystone and a split pediment. The windows above the doorway have volutes and carved keystones, and the middle floor window also has garlands. All the windows are sashes with keystones and aprons. On the east front is a porte cochère.	I
Pair of gatepiers, Hilton Park; 52.64300°N 2.07456°W	—	Early 18th century	The gate piers flank the entrance to the drive to Hilton Hall. They are in stone and have a square plan. Each pier has panels, an over-sailing cornice, and fluted and gadrooned urn finials.	II
The Portobello Tower, Hilton Park; 52.63956°N 2.07540°W	—	Mid 18th century	The tower was built to commemorate the success of Admiral Edward Vernon at the Battle of Portobello in 1739. It is in stone with a hexagonal plan, and has three stages on a moulded plinth, and contains storey bands. The doorway has an architrave and a lintel ramped up to a keystone. Opposite the door is a niche containing an inscribed marble plaque. The windows have semicircular arched heads, bracketed sills, imposts and keystones. Inside there is a spiral staircase.	II
The Conservatory, Hilton Park; 52.64520°N 2.07341°W	—	Early 19th century	The conservatory in the grounds of the hall is partly in cast iron and partly in wood, on a high plastered brick plinth, and has a circular plan. There is one storey above a cellar, and it has a hemispherical dome. The entrance has a pediment, and the cast iron part is divided into bays by pilasters.	I
Coach house and stable block, Hilton Hall; 52.64469°N 2.07155°W	—	c. 1830	The coach house and stable block are in red brick with stone dressings, quoins, and a slate roof, and they consist of four ranges surrounding a courtyard. The south range has one storey and a dentilled eaves band. In the centre is a rusticated semicircular carriage arch with rusticated pilaster strips. Above it is a clock turret with a festooned base and an octagonal cupola with a lead-covered dome.	II
