= Edward Littleton (died 1558) =

16th-century English politician

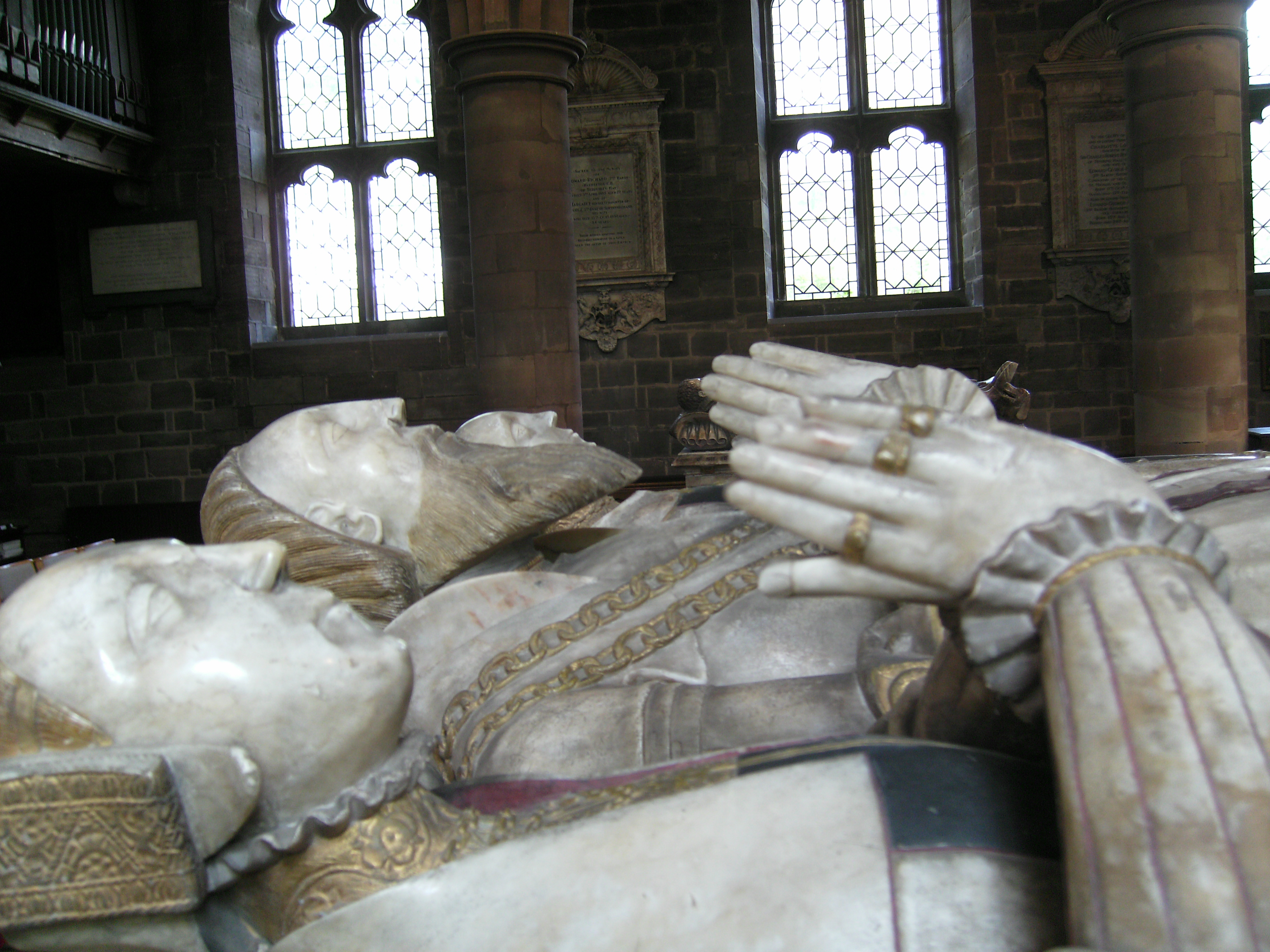
Tomb of Sir Edwarde Lyttelton and his wives, Helen Swynnerton and Isabel Wood, in Penkridge parish church. Attributed to the Royley workshop in Burton on Trent.

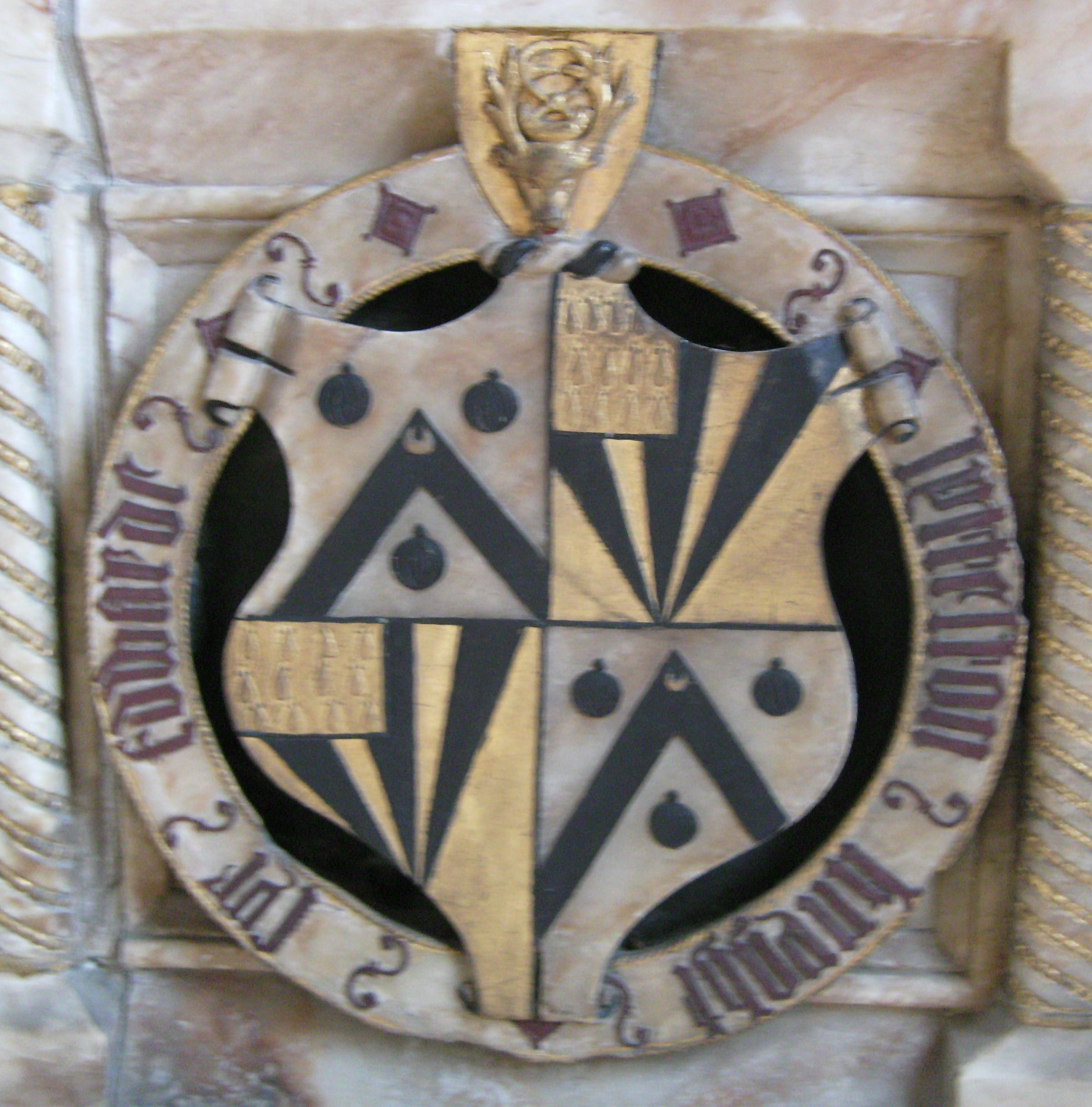
Arms of Sir Edward Littleton.

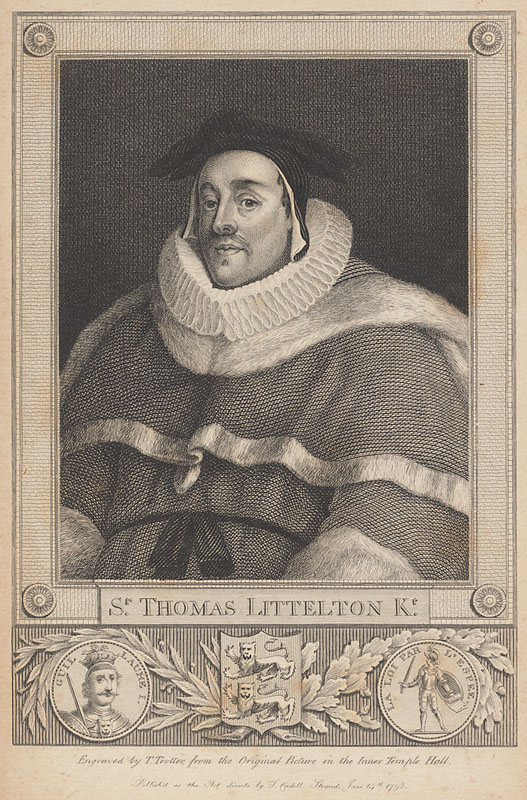
Sir Thomas de Littleton, grandfather of Edward Littleton. An 18th-century engraving after a 15th-century painting.

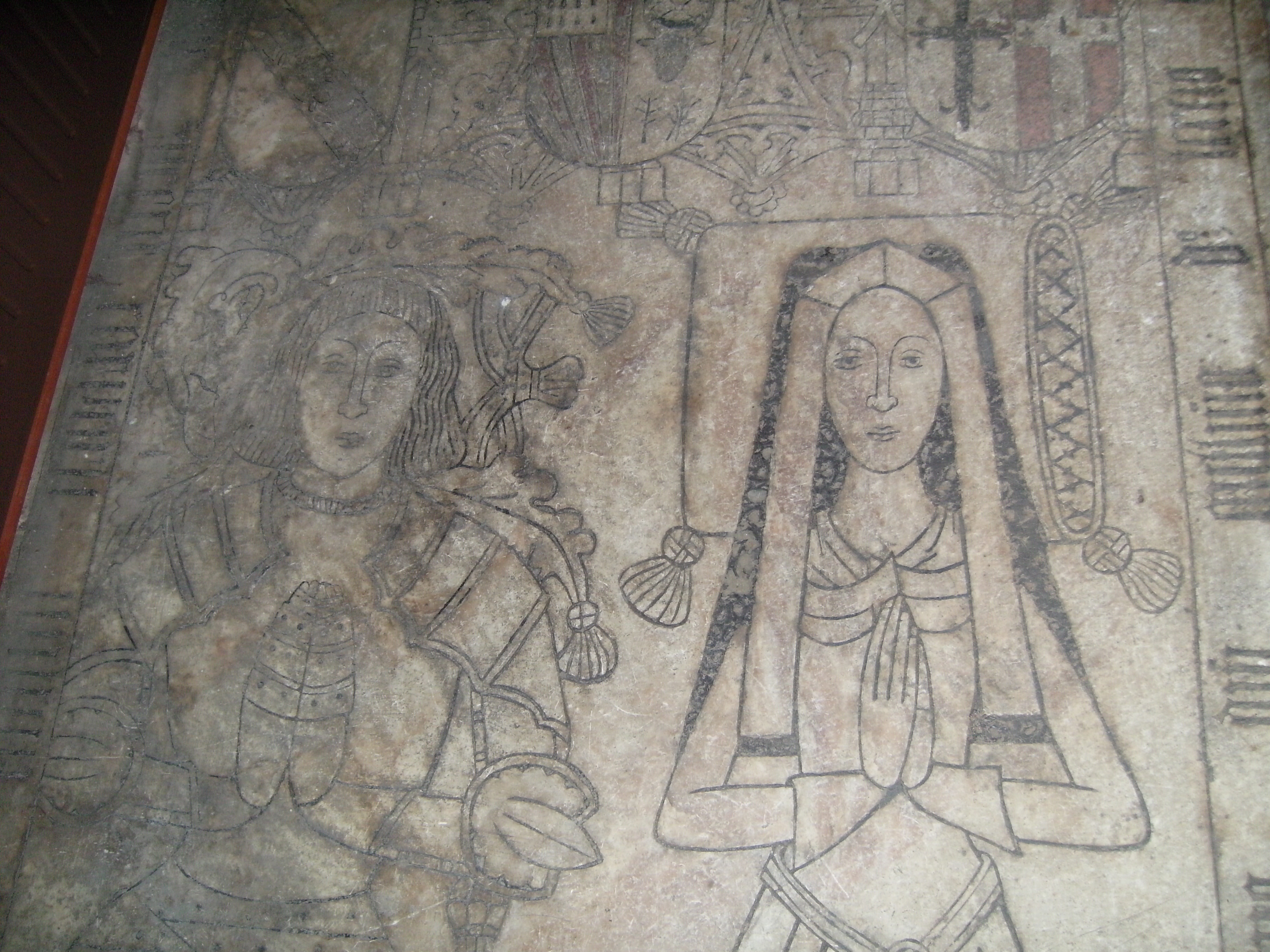
William Wynnesbury of Pillaton Hall and his wife, grandparents of Edward Littleton. From their memorial, in the floor of the south chancel aisle, St. Michael's church, Penkridge.

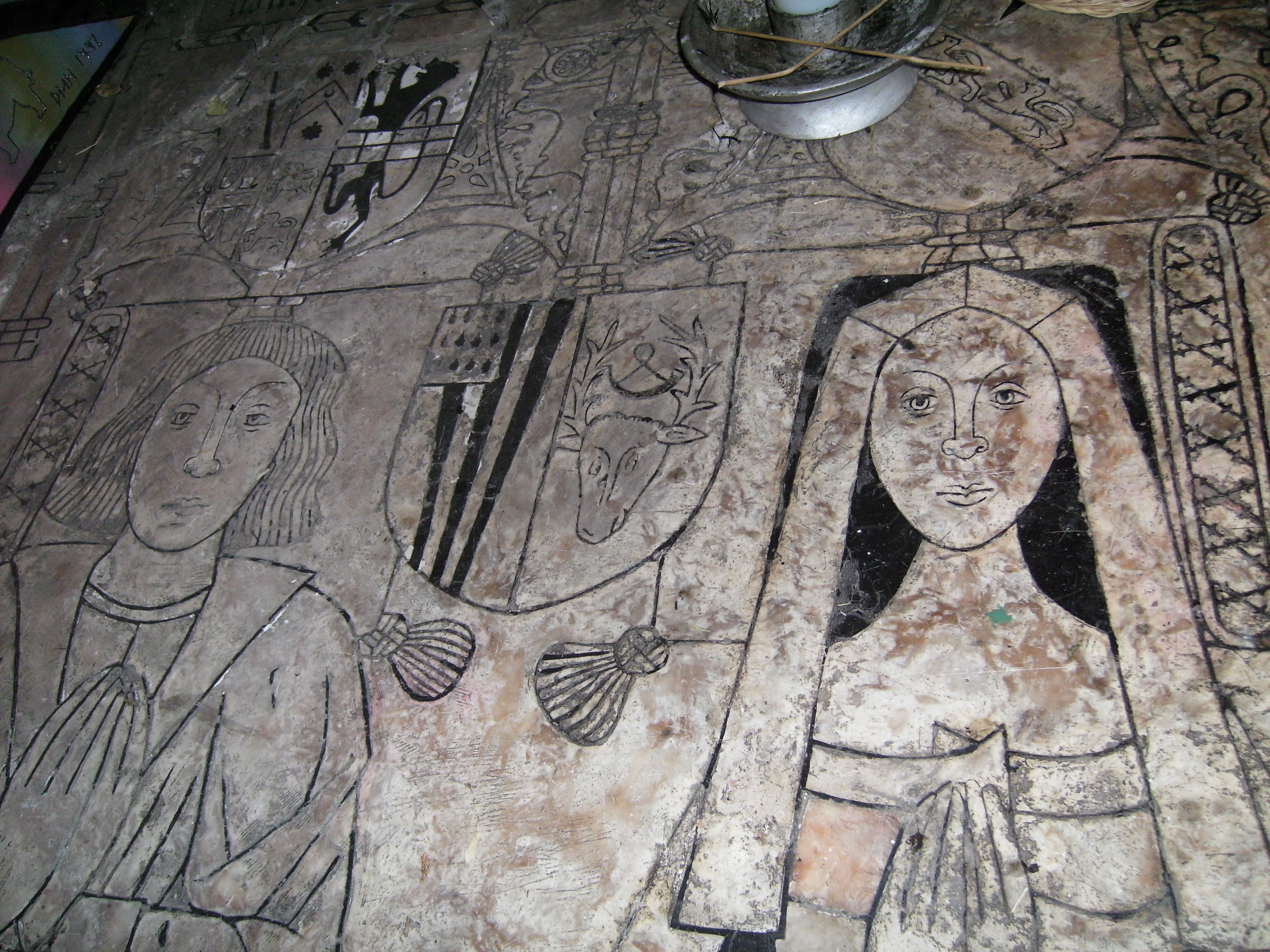
Richard Littleton and Alice Wynnesbury, Edward's parents, on incised slab of their recessed table tomb in the south nave aisle, St. Michael's church.

Edward Littleton or Edwarde Lyttelton (by 1489–1558) was a Staffordshire landowner from the extended Littleton/Lyttelton family. He also served as soldier and Member of Parliament for Staffordshire in the House of Commons of England, the lower house of the Parliament of England, five times.

== Background and early life ==
Edward Littleton's father was Richard Littleton, a younger son of the great 15th-century jurist, Thomas de Littleton. Richard had settled in Staffordshire, his mother's home county, and become surveyor to Edward Stafford, 3rd Duke of Buckingham. He became a tenant and probably steward of William Wynnesbury, who was lord of Pillaton and Otherton, in the parish of Penkridge, in the late 15th century. He inherited Baxterley, Warwickshire, from his father but made his most important gains through marriage.

Edward's mother was Alice Wynnesbury, William's daughter and only heir, whom Richard married. She inherited the Pillaton and Otherton estates, including the moated medieval manor house of Pillaton Hall, when her father died in 1502. Richard died in 1517 and she outlived him by 12 years. Only with her death did the Wynnesbury estates become part of the Littleton inheritance.

Edward Littleton probably received legal training at the Inner Temple, Thomas de Littleton's inn. Probably in 1512, he enlisted to serve in the campaign launched by Henry VIII as part of the War of the League of Cambrai against France. In 1513, Littleton took part in Henry's invasion of northern France, in which his troops defeated the French at the Battle of the Spurs, going on to take the important stronghold of Tournai. Littleton's companion in this campaign was Sir John Giffard of Chillington Hall, near Brewood, a near neighbour who distinguished himself in the fighting.

It was probably Giffard who helped Littleton gain a number of appointments at court and locally in Staffordshire. Littleton himself was of greater note after Richard Littleton's death in 1516 left him in possession of some property. The execution of Buckingham, the most important Staffordshire magnate, in 1521 also opened up numerous lines of preferment in the county. Littleton was made escheator for Staffordshire during 1517–18. He was appointed Gentleman Usher, an important royal honour, by 1522. Around the same time he became constable of Stafford Castle and Keeper of Stafford Park, as well as bailiff of Forebridge. These honours were crowned by becoming High Sheriff of Staffordshire during 1523–24, an honour he was to repeat in 1539–40.

== Parliamentary career ==
With the death of his mother Alice in 1529, Littleton inherited the Pillaton and Otherton estates, together with the hall, making him a much more important force locally. Within months he was elected as the junior of Staffordshire's two Knights of the Shire – a designation for county members of parliament that does not imply a knighthood. His senior colleague was Sir John Giffard, his near neighbour of Chillington Hall.

The 1529 Parliament, known as the Reformation Parliament, assembled in November and was to last for six and a half years. The most important measures in the early years were concerned with stripping away the privileges of the clergy, particularly those that tied them to the Pope, with whom Henry VIII was in continual conflict over the proposed annulment of his marriage to Catherine of Aragon. The fifth session in 1533 dealt with the Statute in Restraint of Appeals, forbidding all appeals to the Pope. Thomas Cromwell, the architect of the act, listed Littleton and Giffard as opposed. However, he was probably generally in favour of the Reformation measures. Both Giffard and Littleton were happy to buy and speculate in lands that came on the market as a result of the Dissolution of the Lesser Monasteries Act, the most important measure of the last session of the 1529–36 Parliament. Certainly Littleton and Thomas Giffard, Sir John's son, were returned to Parliament by the shire again in 1536, with the king's approval. This parliament lasted until 1539, when it passed the Second Act of Dissolution, expropriating the major religious houses. Littleton did not serve in the parliaments of 1542, 1545 and 1547, nor in the first parliament of 1553, which was the last of Edward VI's reign.

In August 1553 Queen Mary I, Henry VIII's Roman Catholic daughter, summoned her first Parliament. In September the local gentry assembled at Stafford and immediately elected Sir Thomas Giffard as their representative. Baron Stafford, Buckingham's son, had made known his intention to have his son, Henry, take up the other county seat and had put two of his allies, Sir George Griffith and Humphrey Welles in charge of the business. However, Littleton had fallen out with the Staffords, previously friends and allies, over fishing rights on the River Penk at Dunston, north of Penkridge. When the young Henry was acclaimed as Giffard's colleague, Littleton intervened and demanded a poll. He persuaded the High Sheriff, George Blount, to begin the poll by examining Stafford's supporters. The latter then began to melt away, leaving Littleton to claim victory, with 248 votes. Stafford petitioned the Privy Council, claiming that the Sheriff had also discriminated against his son in the previous election, earlier in the year. Littleton took his case to the Lord Chancellor, Stephen Gardiner, who found in his favour. The case caused lasting ill-feeling between the Staffords and Littletons. Littleton was knighted in October at the assembly of the parliament.

Littleton seems to have accepted rather than welcomed the restoration of Catholicism in Mary's reign. As there was never a suggestion of restoring the monasteries and chantries, the gains made by the landed interest in the previous reigns were never under threat. Littleton's attitude was not warm enough to get him into the next Parliament, in the spring of 1554. However, he was returned for the second Parliament of that year, with his stepson, Sir Philip Draycott as second member, and for the 1555 Parliament, with Sir Thomas Giffard again.

== Religious beliefs ==
Littleton seems to have been a religious conservative, opposing the initial break with the Papacy. His main associates, like the Giffards, had similar attitudes. However, none of them opposed changes that benefited the landed gentry, particularly the dissolution of the monasteries. Unlike the northern gentry, who led the Pilgrimage of Grace, a large and threatening rebellion against the dissolution, the Staffordshire gentry, not least Littleton, clamoured to buy newly-marketable land and houses. However, the theological conservatism remained, with a strong attachment to traditional Catholic dogma. This fitted well with Henry VIII's own attitudes but Littleton still managed to turn it to his own disadvantage.

Littleton's most important intervention on a theological issue was in the case of George Blagge, at the time MP for Bedford. On 9 May 1546 Blagge was induced to deny the efficacy of the Mass, by trickery he alleged, while walking home after church. He was immediately summoned by Thomas Wriothesley, the Lord Chancellor, and sent to Newgate Prison. At his trial at the Guildhall, the main witnesses for the prosecution were Littleton and Sir Hugh Calverley, MP for Cheshire. On their evidence, Blagge was sentenced to be burned for heresy the following Wednesday. Fortunately for him, the Lord Privy Seal, John Russell, appealed on his behalf to the king, who had not heard of the proceedings to that point. Henry immediately pardoned Blagge and ordered Wriothesley to release him.

The real sin of Blagge seems to have been that he was openly opposed to the influence of Thomas Howard, 3rd Duke of Norfolk, who was one of the most powerful men in the country. Blagge feared that he would exercise too much influence over the future Edward VI and had said as much to Norfolk's son, Henry Howard, Earl of Surrey. It is unclear whether Blagge at that time actually held the Sacramentarian views imputed to him: five years later he gave evidence against Stephen Gardiner, specifically pinpointing the bishops traditional views on the Eucharist. However, in testifying against Blagge, Littleton was acting, consciously or not, in the interests of the Howard dynasty. Henry clearly shared Blagge's fears, and soon acted against both the Howards. So Littleton's part in the case did not endear him to the king. Still less did it endear him to the subsequent regime. This is probably part of the reason he stayed away from Parliament for some years.

== Landowner ==
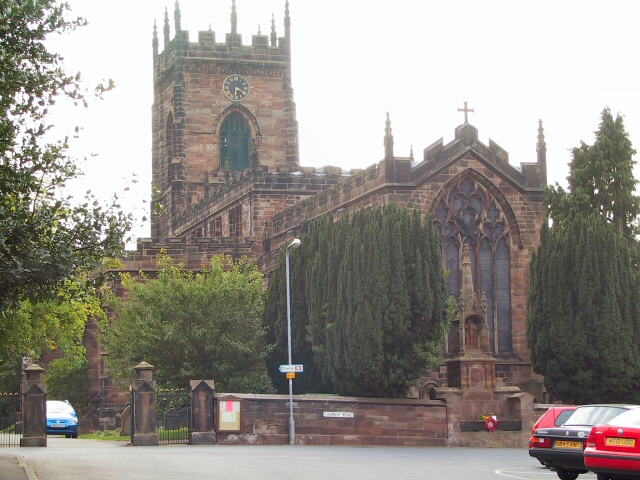
Penkridge parish church today. Much of its external appearance seems to be the result of alterations in Perpendicular style made in the time of Edward Littleton. His acquisition of the deanery lease was a key step in his family's rise to fortune.

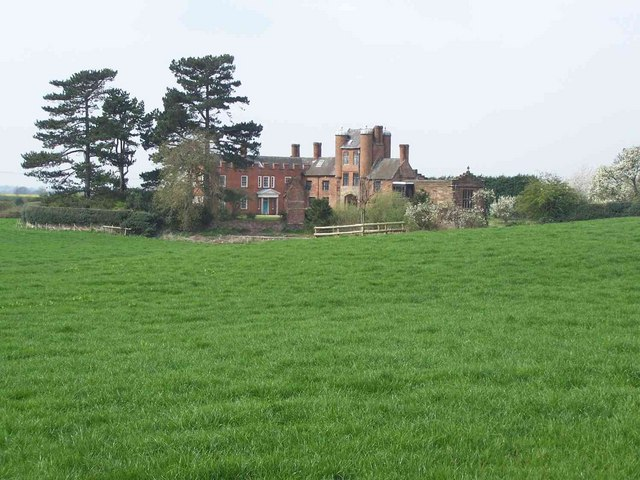
Remains of Pillaton Old Hall, near Penkridge, Staffordshire. The original moated manor house became ruinous after the family moved to Teddesley Hall, but the Gatehouse and Chapel were restored in the 1880s.

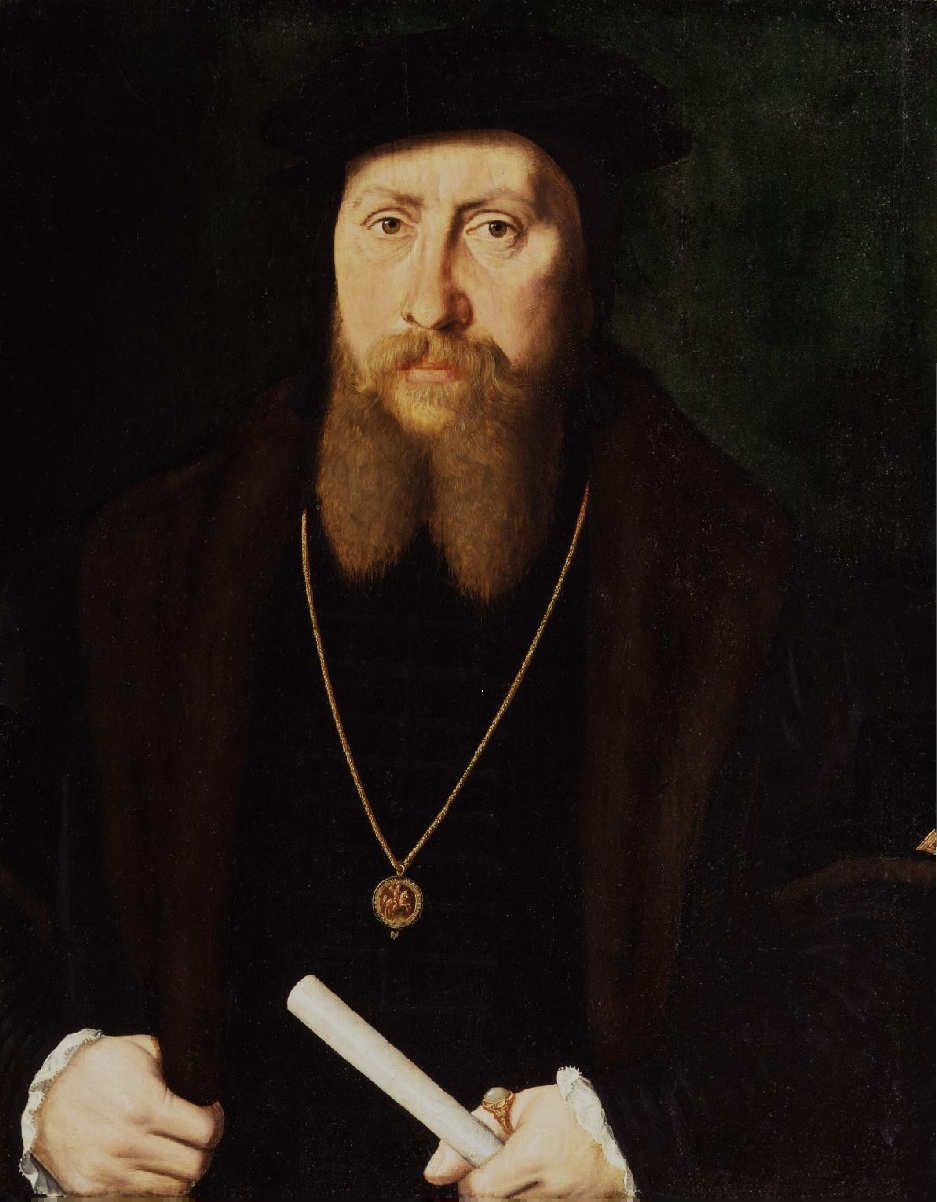
Sir William Paget, technically Littleton's overlord in the key estate of Pillaton, although he received only 16s. a year for it.

Littleton consolidated and enlarge his family's holdings of land, taking advantage wherever possible of the revolution in land ownership carried through by the Tudor dynasty – in particular the Dissolution of the monasteries and of the chantries, which changed many relationships and created many opportunities. He was frequently involved in litigation and other disputes in his pursuit of these ends.

Pillaton itself, with the manor house, actually belonged to Burton Abbey, probably since about, when Wulfric Spot donated land in the area. Dissolution placed overlordship in the hands of the king, and Henry VIII gave it to Sir William Paget in 1546: it was to rest in the Paget family's hands for at least two centuries. However, the Littletons, as terre tenants, were secure in possession of Pillaton. When Edward Littleton died in 1558, the rent they paid to the overlord amounted to just 16 shillings, while the estate was valued at £15 3s. 9d.

Black Ladies Priory, Brewood, was one of the very small houses swept away in the first round of dissolutions in 1536. Littleton and Thomas Giffard both petitioned the King for the right to buy the site and property. Both apparently received his consent. Littleton won the support of Rowland Lee, the bishop of Coventry and Lichfield. The issue went to Thomas Cromwell who decided to sell to Giffard, who, after some negotiation, bought the site, mill and demesne lands, worth £7 9s. 1d. a year, for £134 1s. 8d. The competition for the priory does not seem to have affected relationship between Giffard and Littleton adversely. Haughmond Abbey in Shropshire was a much larger property, put on the market after the Suppression of Religious Houses Act 1539. Bishop Lee supported Littleton in his bid to buy the Abbey, and he acquired it in 1540. Two years later, he sold it, presumably at a profit, to Rowland Hill, a Shropshire-born businessman who was to become Lord Mayor of London seven years later.

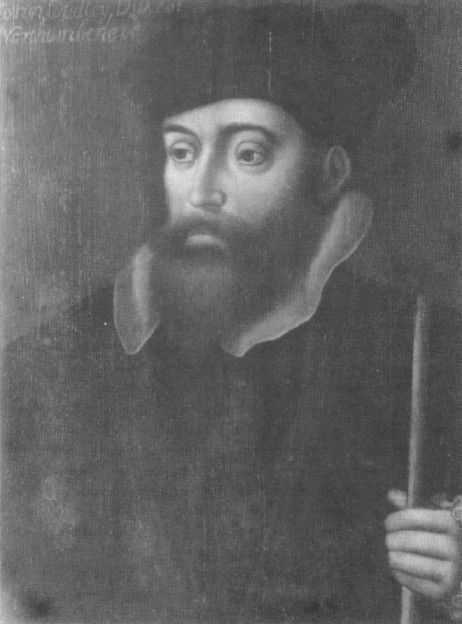
John Dudley, later to become Earl of Warwick and Duke of Northumberland, pictured on a painted panel at Penshurst Place, Kent.

In 1543 Littleton leased the deanery manor of Penkridge from the collegiate church of St. Michael and All Angels. This included everything from the site of the church itself and the canons' residential buildings, to paddocks in the town and areas of arable land and pasture, most of it farmed by tenants, around the town. The deanery manor had existed since the 13th century, when Henry de Loundres, Archbishop of Dublin and dean of Penkridge, had acquired the manor of Penkridge at the instigation of King John and divided it into two. The smaller part, conferred on the church was known as the deanery manor, while the remainder was placed in lay hands – in the 16th century the Grevilles, who were Barons Willoughby de Broke. The church was a Royal Peculiar which had survived since the Anglo-Saxon period. However, the deanery and college were soon abolished by the dissolution of the chantries under Edward VI in 1547. The Crown conferred the deanery manor on John Dudley, Earl of Warwick, an immensely ambitious member of Edward's government. Dudley had also recently acquired Penkridge manor itself by foreclosing on a loan from his father to the cash-strapped Grevilles.

Warwick, soon to become Duke of Northumberland, inherited the deanery's legal obligations. The lease still stood and Littleton was able to continue exploiting the estate in return for annual rent. The assessment carried out at the dissolution in 1547 valued the college's property at £82 6s. 8d. annually. It was because of his attempts to maximise the value of the deanery manor that Littleton got into dispute with Stafford. The latter believed that Northumberland was used as a buckler in the dispute, i.e. that his great power shielded Littleton when he was in the wrong. The downfall of Northumberland at the beginning of Mary's reign returned the deanery manor to the Crown, but the Littletons continued to lease it until, in the 1580s Littleton's grandson was able to buy the estate.

Another acquisition, hugely important in the future to Littleton's family, was Teddesley Hay. This sparsely populated area was part of the royal forest of Cannock, sometimes (not quite accurately) called Cannock Chase: Cannock Chase originally referred to the bishop's hunting grounds, which were contiguous with the king's. The Hay was granted to Dudley in 1550. After his execution in 1553 it reverted to the Crown, but Dudley's widow, Jane Dudley, Duchess of Northumberland was granted a life's interest in it from 1554. However, she died only a year later and Littleton was able to buy the Hay. Two hundred years later it would become the site of a new home for the Littletons: Teddesley Hall.

Littleton clearly became both rich and locally powerful through his numerous dealings. Both Pillaton Hall and the parish church of St. Michael were greatly altered in the early to mid-16th century. The hall was rebuilt in typical Tudor style. The church acquired a Littleton family chapel in its south aisle and was partly rebuilt in Perpendicular style, with impressive square tower and east windows of local sandstone. Littleton must have played a significant part in all of these changes, although some may have continued in his son's time.

== Contemporary assessments ==
When he was sued by a son of Sampson Erdeswicke, the noted Staffordshire antiquarian, Littleton was described as:

"a man of great lands [who] beareth all the rule in those parts of the shire, and is greatly friended and allied."

This was intended as a criticism of Littleton. Stafford, a former friend who became his main enemy among the local magnates, described how, in his later years:

"after his ... dissembling fashion offered to have taken me by his hand and I told him he should neither have hand or heart of me for his evil, false and untrue report of me ... to the lord chancellor."

It appears that some contemporaries regarded Littleton as an upstart. While the local nobility and their retainers assumed a value system derived from feudal society, Littleton and other landed gentry were essentially rural entrepreneurs, making their fortunes in a profoundly changed rural economy.

== Marriages and family ==
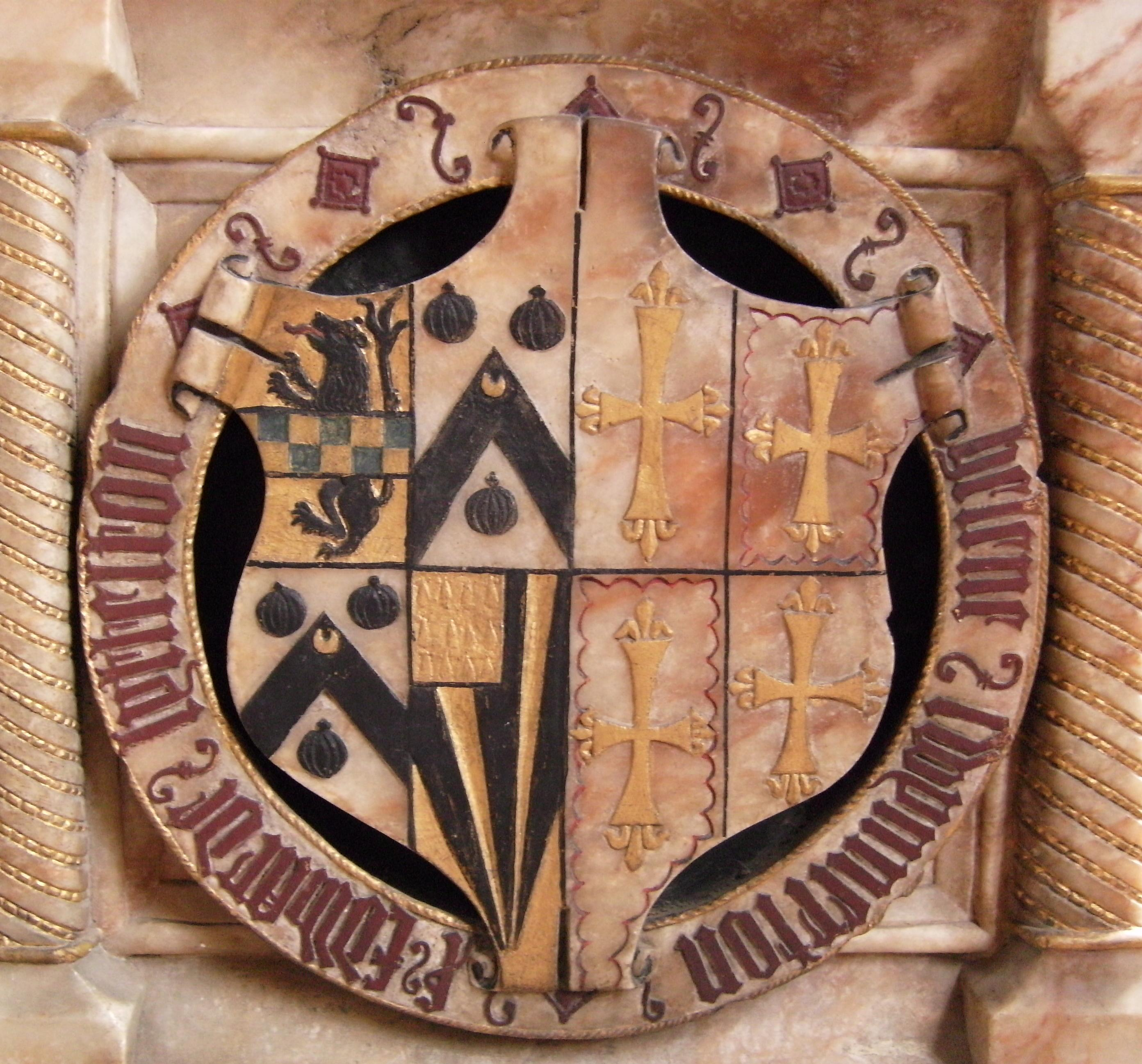
Arms of Sir Edward Littleton impaled with those of his first wife, Helen Swynnerton, on their tomb in St Michael's church, Penkridge, Staffordshire.

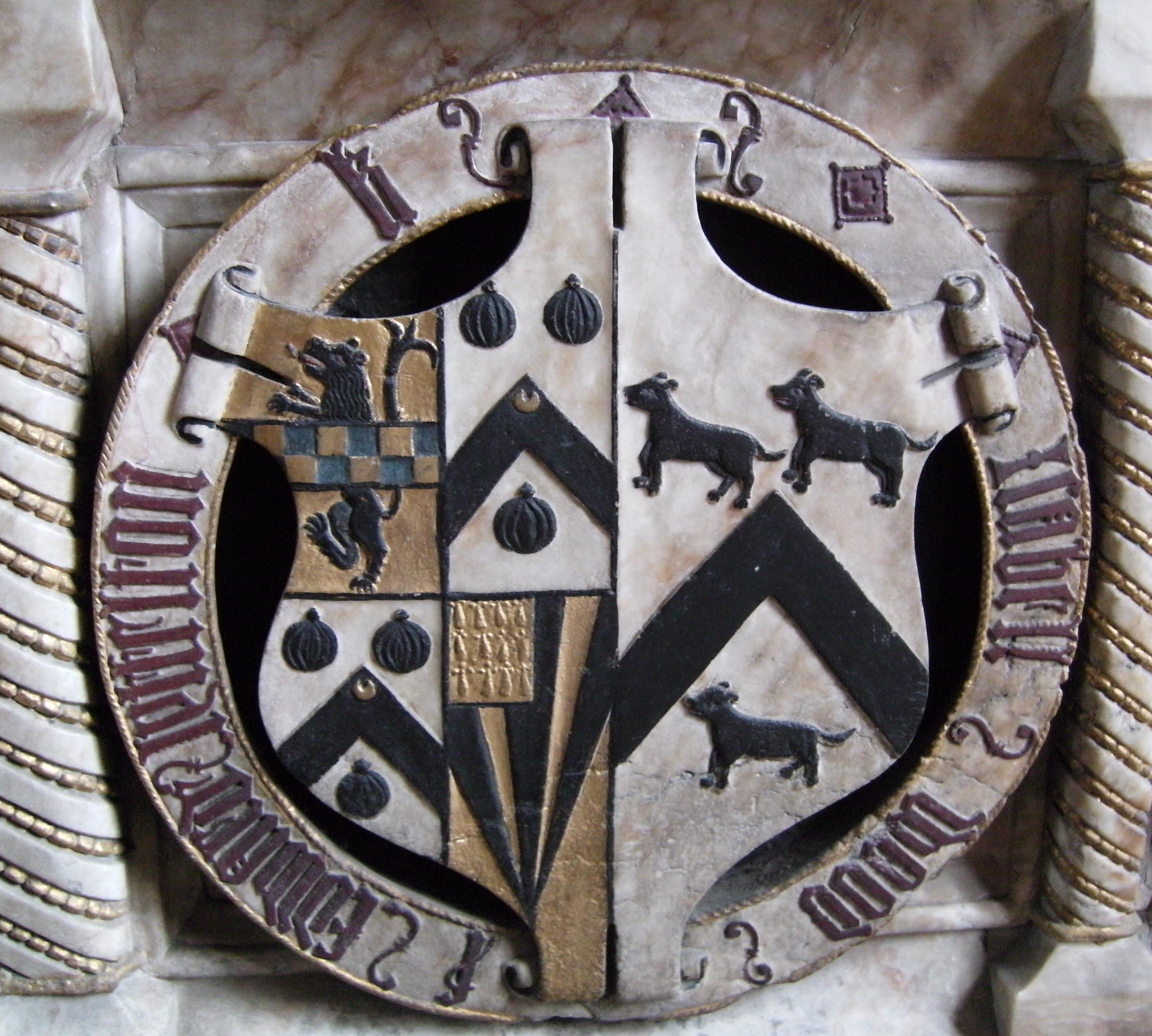
Arms of Sir Edward Littleton, impaled with those of his second wife, Isabel Wood.

Littleton married twice:

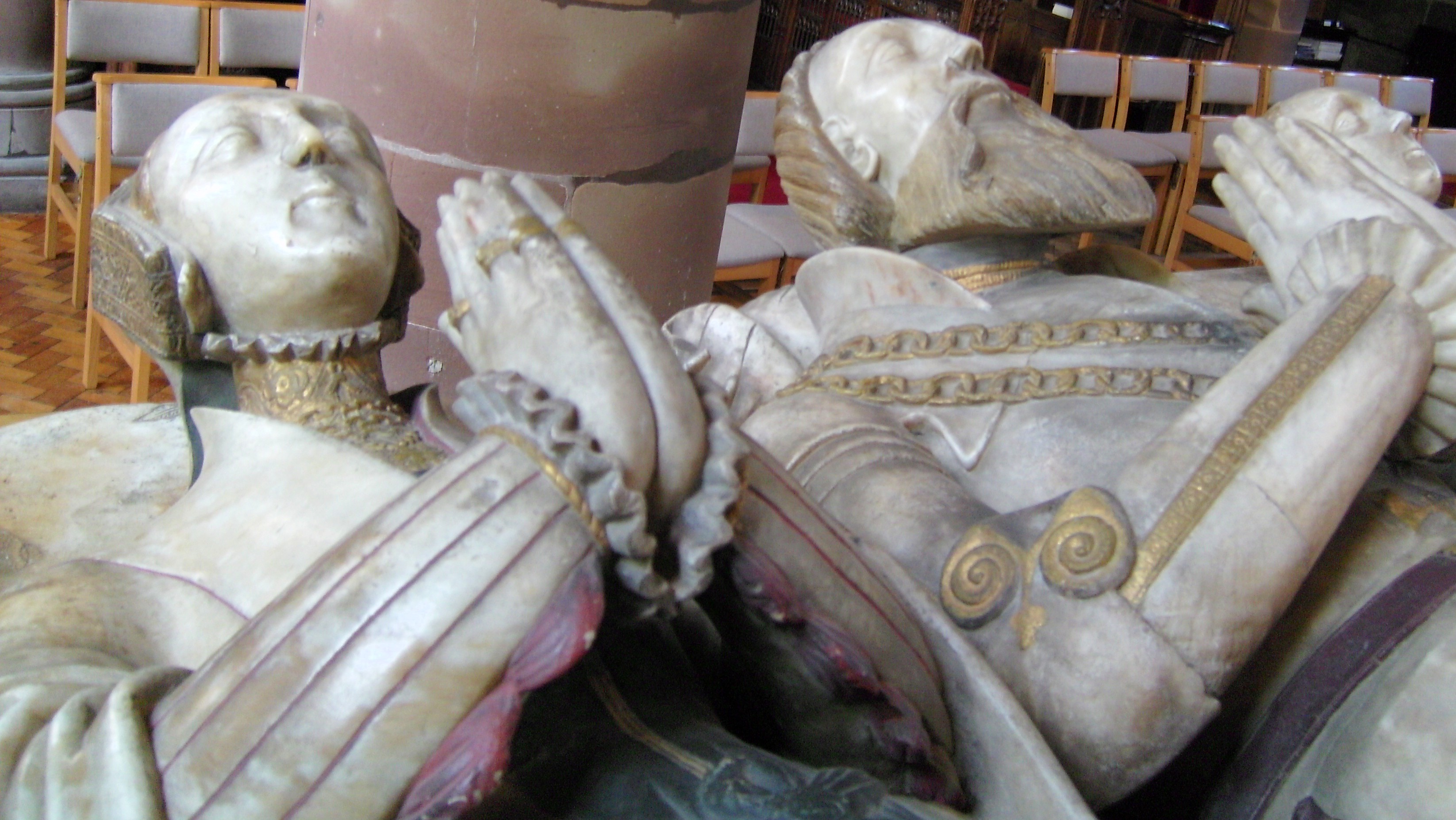
Helen Swynnerton, represented in gable hood, distinctive of an earlier stage in the history of fashion than Isabel Wood's dress.

- Helen Swynnerton, daughter of Humphrey Swynnerton of Swynnerton, was his first wife. They married before 1527 – perhaps long before. They had two sons and two daughters.

- Isabel Wood, whose father is otherwise unknown, was his second wife. They married before April 1533. Isabel had been married twice before, firstly to Ralph Egerton of Wrinehill, and secondly to Sir John Draycott (died May 1522) of Paynsley Hall, near Draycott.

Littleton died on 10 October 1558 at Pillaton Hall. He was buried in St. Michael's church, apparently in the family chapel, and a large alabaster tomb for himself and both his wives was installed. This was later moved to the south side of the chancel, where it remains.

A son by Helen Swynnerton, Edward Littleton, succeeded him in his estates.

== See also ==
- History of Penkridge
- Littleton Baronets
