= John Giffard (died 1556) =

Member of the Parliament of England

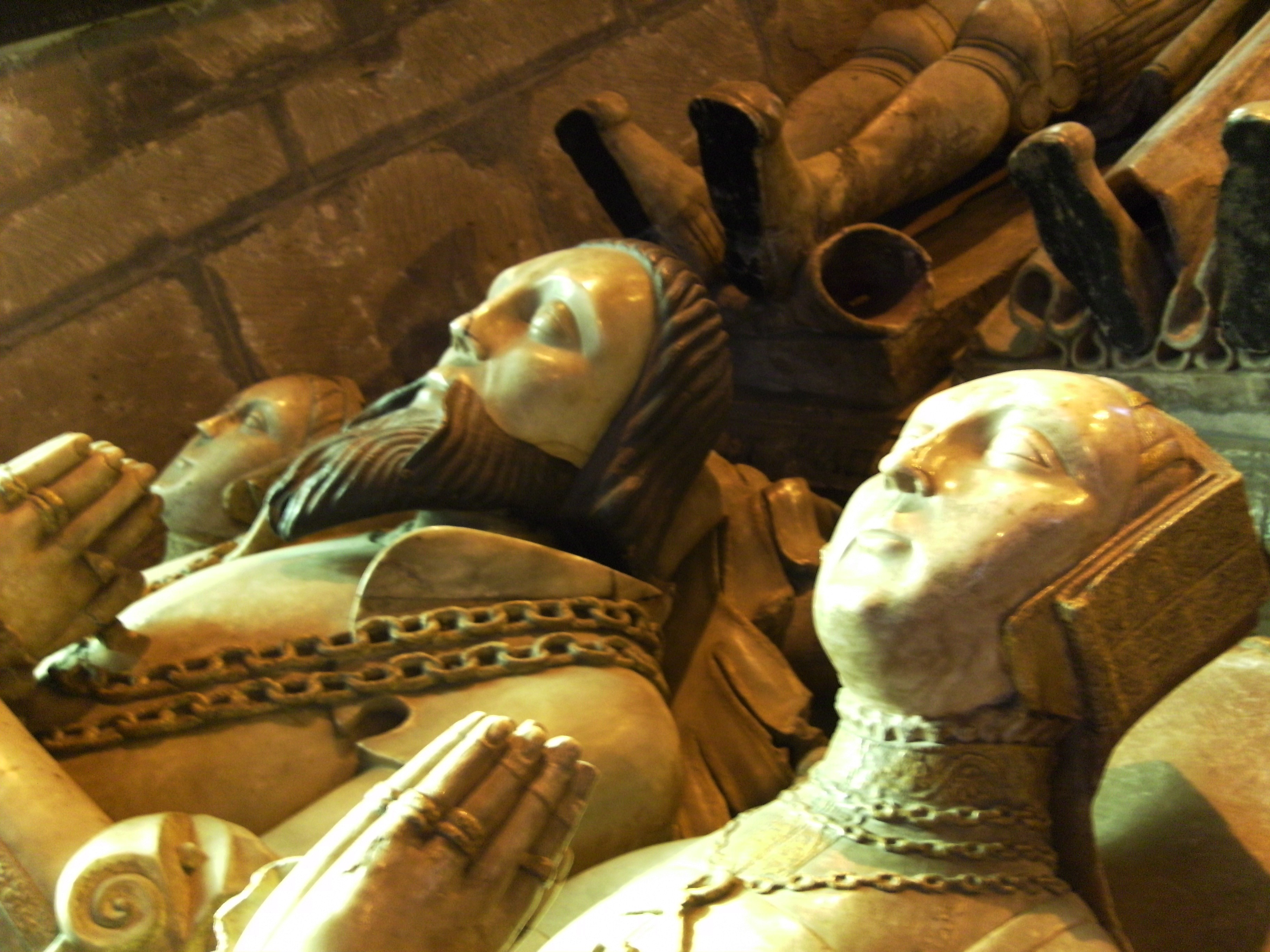
Sir John Giffard and his wives, Jane and Elizabeth, from their alabaster tomb in Brewood parish church.

Sir John Giffard (c. 1465-13 November 1556), of Chillington in Brewood, was a soldier, courtier, member of the English Parliament and Staffordshire landowner, who made his mark mainly during the reign of Henry VIII.

== Background and early life ==
Giffard was the eldest son of Robert Giffard of Chillington by his second wife, Cassandra Humphreston, daughter of Thomas Humphreston. The Giffard family had been settled at Chillington since the late 12th century.

Little is known of his early life. He married Jane Horde, daughter of Bridgnorth's wealthiest landowner, in 1483, when he was about 17 years old. About the age of 20, in 1486, his father Robert died and he inherited the substantial Giffard estates, centred on Brewood.

It is thought that Thomas Horde, his father-in-law might have advanced his career, perhaps introducing him at the royal court during the reign of Henry VII. Certainly he was well enough known there to be present in 1509 at Henry VII's funeral and at the coronation of his son, Henry VIII. From that date he held important posts in the royal household, gentleman usher and sewer of the chamber, and it seems likely that he held them even earlier. He had been made a Justice of the Peace in Staffordshire in 1501, a post he held until his death.

== Courtier ==
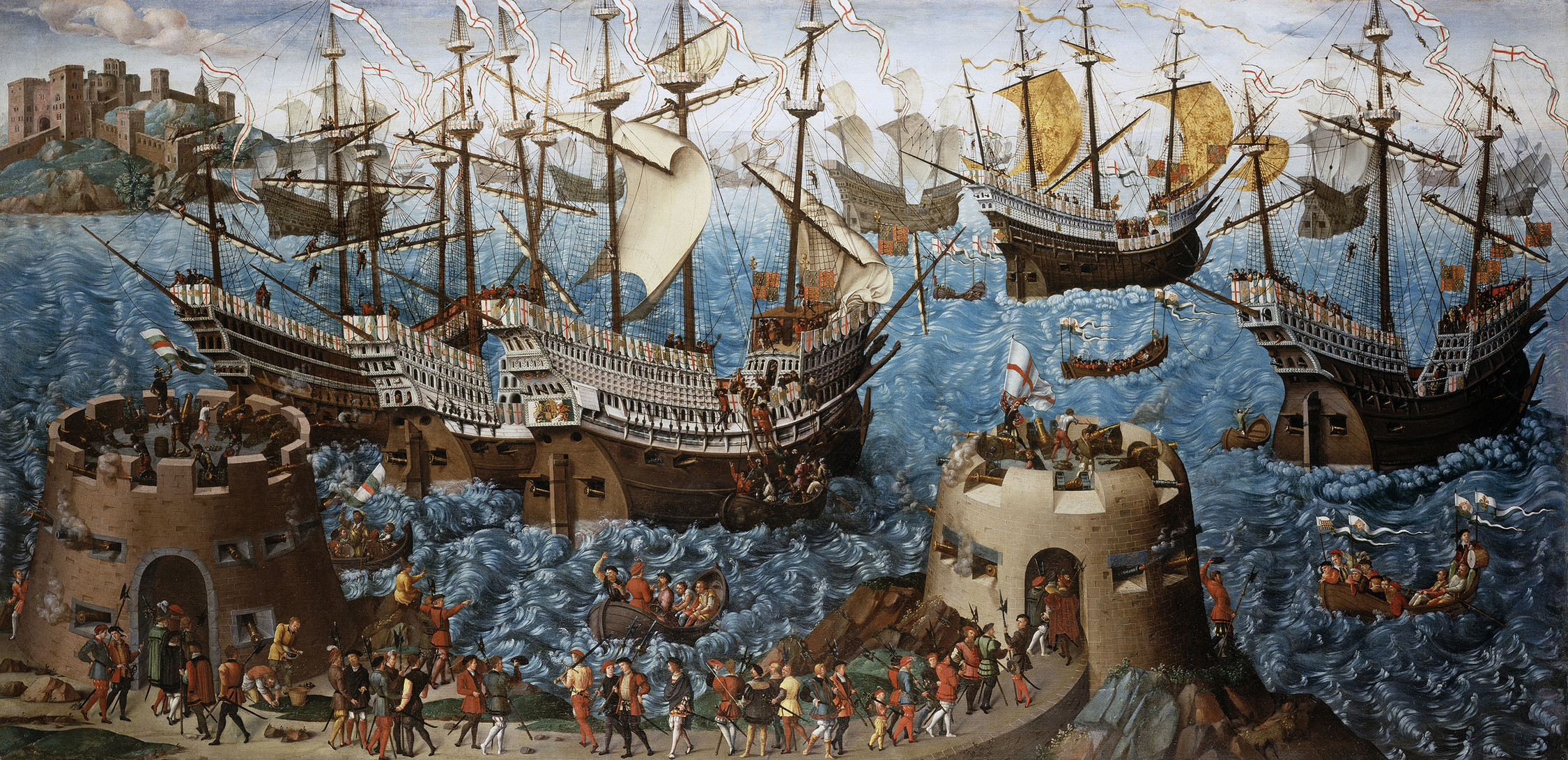
The embarkation of Henry VIII in 1520. Giffard accompanied him on this expedition, during which he met both the French king and the Emperor.

From 1509 Giffard's career in royal service becomes known and notable. As well as the posts of gentleman usher and sewer, in which Henry VIII perhaps confirmed him, he was appointed Ranger of the Seven Hayes of Cannock Forest on 2 June 1509. A few months later, the title was altered to the less grandiloquent Ranger of Cannock Forest, and Giffard was to hold it until his death. On 25 September 1513 he was knighted at the battle of the Spurs in France. However, in 1515, Giffard, now a widower, offended the king by remarrying without his permission. He was able to repair relations, but only after paying a fine.

Giffard was at court regularly for thirty years or more, and accompanied the royal family on many important state occasions. In 1520 he crossed the Channel again to attend the Field of the Cloth of Gold, Henry's meeting with Francis I of France, and was also at Gravelines two weeks later for the king's meeting with the queen's nephew, Charles V, Holy Roman Emperor. He was a confidant of both the king and the queen, Catherine of Aragon, but his position seems not to have been damaged when they separated. He was present at the coronation of Anne Boleyn on 1 June 1533. Late in 1539, he and his son, Thomas were sent to Kent to prepare for the arrival of Anne of Cleves at Dover Castle and at Sittingbourne. Early in 1540 he also acted as whiffler, or horn-blower, when Anne was publicly received at Blackheath.

== Soldier ==
For all his attendance at court, Giffard was a serious soldier. In 1513, he distinguished himself in Henry's invasion of northern France, in which English troops defeated the French at the Battle of the Spurs, going on to take the important stronghold of Tournai. He was allowed to carry the Royal Standard of England before the king during this campaign, on which he was accompanied by his friend and near neighbour Edward Littleton of Pillaton Hall. It was after the taking of Tournai that he was knighted.

Giffard was granted a standard in 1523 and may have served in southern France. At some time by 1533, he was made a knight of the body, a member of the royal body guard, a courtly and military honour. In 1536 he was sent to help fight the Pilgrimage of Grace, the rising in Yorkshire and Lincolnshire against the Dissolution of the Lesser Monasteries Act.

== Parliamentary career ==
Giffard's only definite period as a Member of the English Parliament was during the English Reformation Parliament, which lasted from 1529 until 1536. However, his name appears on subsidy commissions, the bodies charged with imposing taxation and made up mainly of MPs, between 1512 and 1524, so he may have held a seat outside Staffordshire before the known election.

Giffard's election in 1529 was as a knight of the shire for his native county of Staffordshire. He was placed first in the order of precedence, above his friend and neighbour Littleton. In the first half of the 16th century, most member for the county sat for only one term, and Littleton's record in serving in five parliaments was unique. Members came from a small circle of landed gentry families: Giffard was reckoned a leading man in the county at the time of his election – second only to the Earl of Shrewsbury.

Giffard joined Queen's Head group – a discussion meeting of MPs in the Queen's Head tavern. Another member of the group was Sir George Throckmorton, whose sister married Thomas Giffard. Throckmorton, Littleton and Sir John Giffard were all placed by Thomas Cromwell on a list believed to be of members opposed to the 1533 Statute in Restraint of Appeals. This abolished the right of appeal to the Pope in both civil and ecclesiastical cases, and opposition to it was considered a touchstone of religious conservatism. However, Giffard attended the coronation of Ann Boleyn at the end of the 1533 session, and there is no hint that he opposed any of the more radical reforms that came later. Thomas Giffard and Littleton were soon involved in friendly competition for the monastic properties made available after the dissolution of 1536, while Sir John himself enquired after monastic lands at the Blackheath reception 1540.

It is possible that Giffard was feeling some disquiet at the pace of change, however, and on 5 June 1533 he obtained a licence for himself and his wife to leave the country on a pilgrimage to Amiens, a shrine of John the Baptist, celebrated for his resistance to royal power. It is not known how long they stayed in France, but it seems likely that Giffard returned for further sessions of the Reformation Parliament. He certainly went off northward to defend its decisions by force of arms in 1536. There is no record of who Staffordshire returned to Parliament in 1536, but Henry VIII had forcefully requested that all existing members serve again, so it is likely that both he and Littleton were re-elected. He was now over seventy years of age and his son Thomas took over from him in the 1539 election.

== Landowner ==
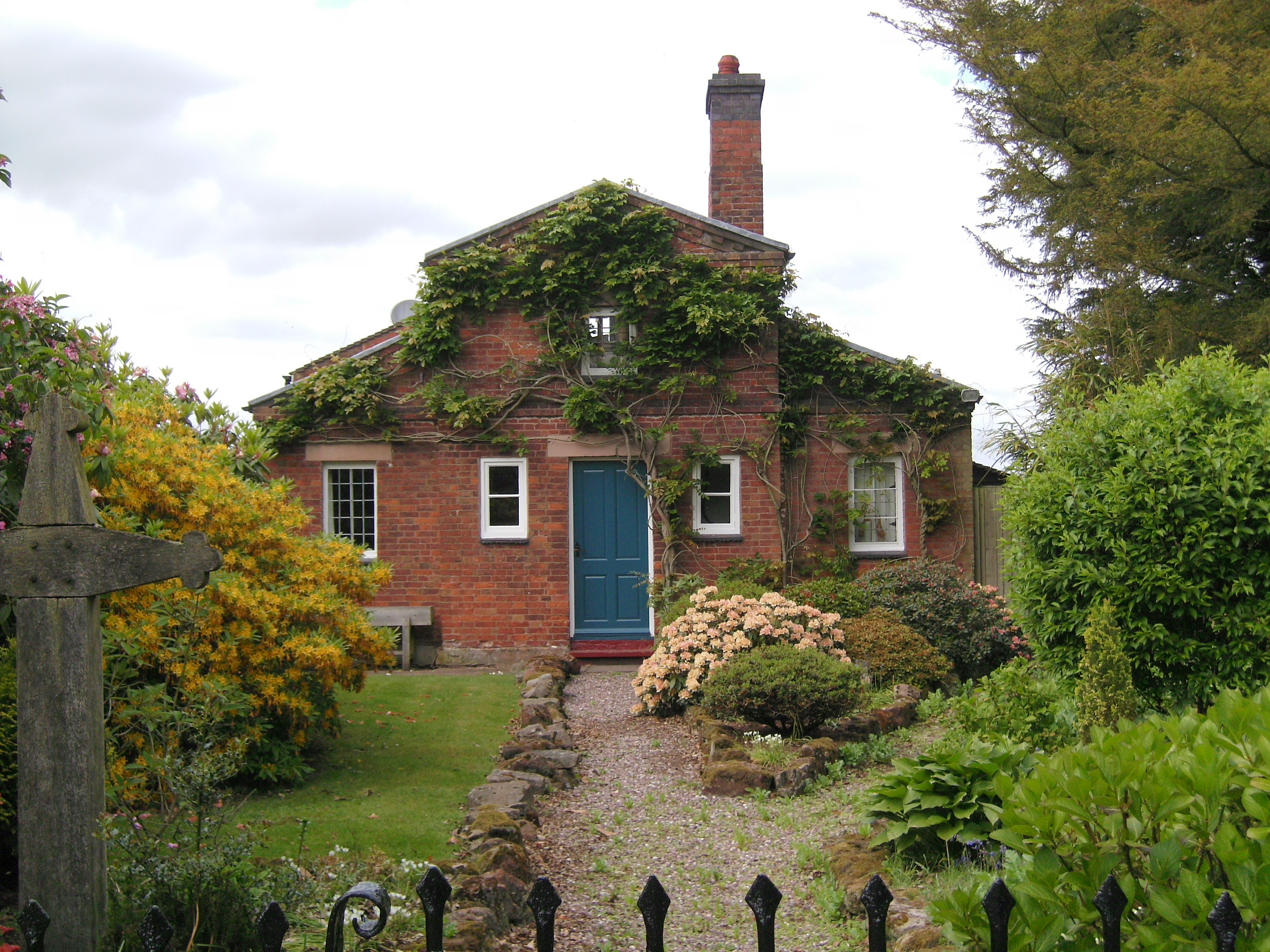
Giffard's Cross and the Georgian entrance lodge at the Upper Avenue, Chillington. The cross is said to commemorate the shooting dead of an escaped and dangerous panther by Sir John Giffard.

Giffard's main estate was Chillington, which had a small village, since disappeared, and a water mill, as well as the medieval moated and fortified manor house. Sir John carried out a complete reconstruction of the house on the same site. The new hall was a quadrangular building house with a gatehouse on its eastern side – a plan similar to the roughly contemporary Pillaton Hall built by Edward Littleton. It was considered "remarkable for the various forms of its windows and chimneys." As the same site was also used for the extant Georgian house, only fragments of Sir John's building remain, probably including carved panels incorporated into the present fireplace of the saloon, thought to occupy the site of the 16th century great hall.

Allegedly Giffard kept a menagerie at Chillington, from which a panther escaped. The point at which he shot it with a crossbow is marked by Giffard's Cross, which is now in the garden of a small Georgian gate lodge. The original wooden cross, with its trefoil terminals to the arms, decayed and the present cross is a replica.

In addition to Chillington, Giffard inherited the small estate of Walton, near Eccleshall. He began to extend his family's holdings locally. In 1495 he leased the estate of Hatton from the Bishop of Lichfield By the time of his death he also held a substantial part of Broom Hall as tenant of the bishop, although it seems that Sir John made a wedding present of his land at Broom Hall to Thomas Giffard in 1531. The estate was divided between the Giffards and the Lanes of Bentley. One of Sir John's tenants at Broom Hall was Thomas Careless. This partnership of the Lane, Giffard and Careless families was to prove crucial in the Escape of Charles II in 1651. In addition to these important local acquisitions, he also obtained from the king a number of lordships in Staffordshire, including Plardiwick, near Gnosall, Pattingham and Marston.

As befitting an important landowner in the county, Giffard was pricked High Sheriff of Staffordshire in 1509 – part of a shower of honours that descended on him that year. However, he was also Sheriff a further five times: 1517–18, 1522–3, 1526–7, 1530–1, 1541–2.

== Marriages and family ==
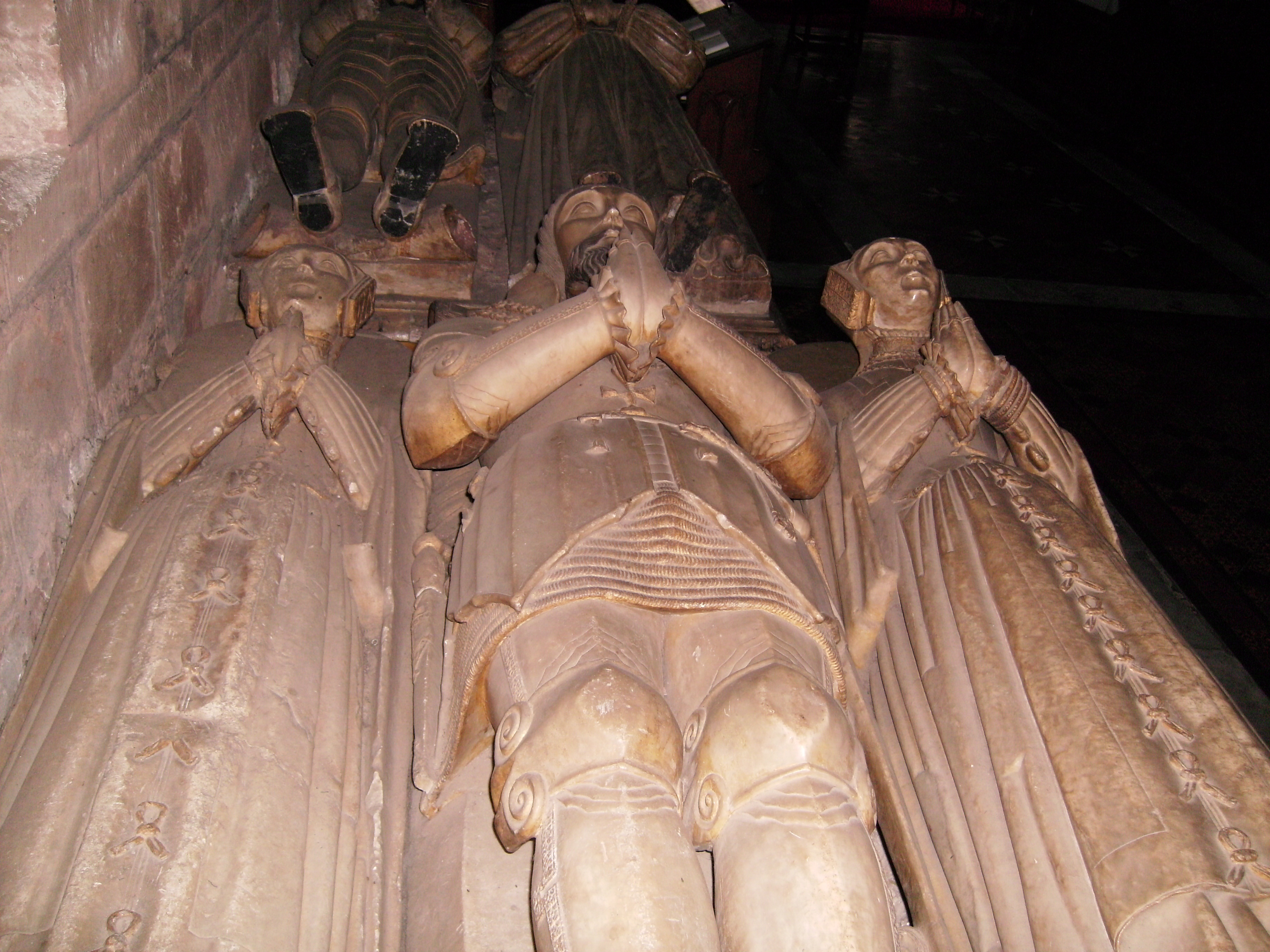
Sir John Giffard, who died in 1556, during the reign of Queen Mary, when Catholicism was temporarily restored. He is flanked by his wives, Jane and Elizabeth.

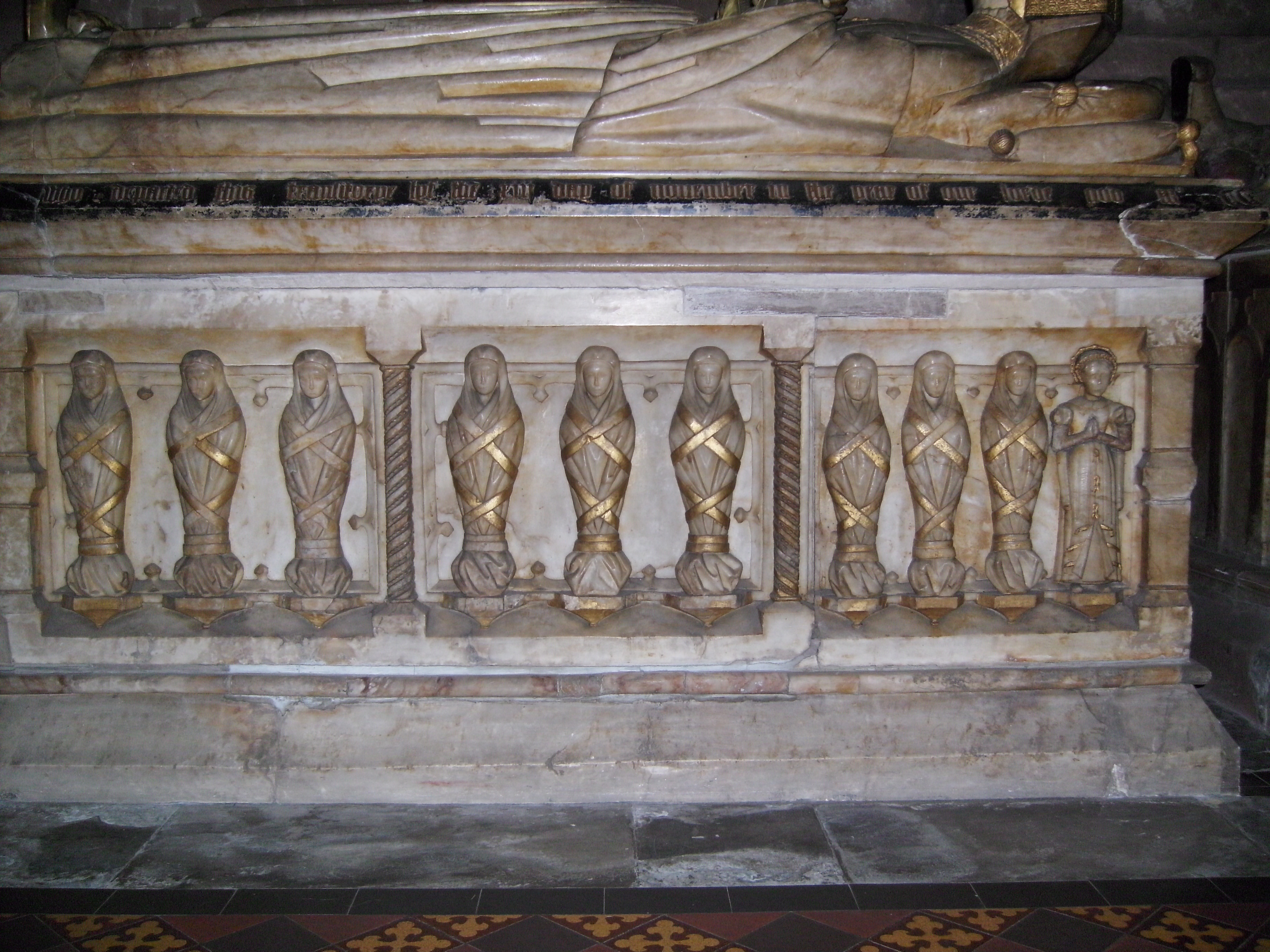
Children on Sir John Giffard's tomb, most predeceasing him, as shown by the grave clothes.

Sir John Giffard married twice.

- Jane Horde or Hoord was his first wife. She was the daughter of Thomas Horde of Horde Park, just north of Bridgnorth, Shropshire. They married in 1483 and she died in childbirth on 8 December 1491, having borne 7 daughters and 2 sons, including Thomas Giffard, Sir John's heir, and Cassandra Giffard, who married Humphrey Swynnerton. Most of the children seem to have died at birth or while still young.
- Elizabeth Montgomery, daughter of Sir Thomas Gresley of Colton, Staffordshire, was his second wife. The date of the marriage is uncertain but was by April 1515, when Giffard got into trouble with Henry VIII for marrying without permission. Elizabeth was the widow of Sir John Montgomery of Cubley, Derbyshire. She and Giffard had 4 sons and a daughter, Frances. Frances was the mother of John Talbot of Grafton, MP (d.1611).

Giffard and his wives were interred in the parish church of St. Mary and St. Chad in Brewood. An impressive alabaster tomb was later installed, with part-gilded effigies of all three.
