= Thomas Giffard =

Member of the Parliament of England

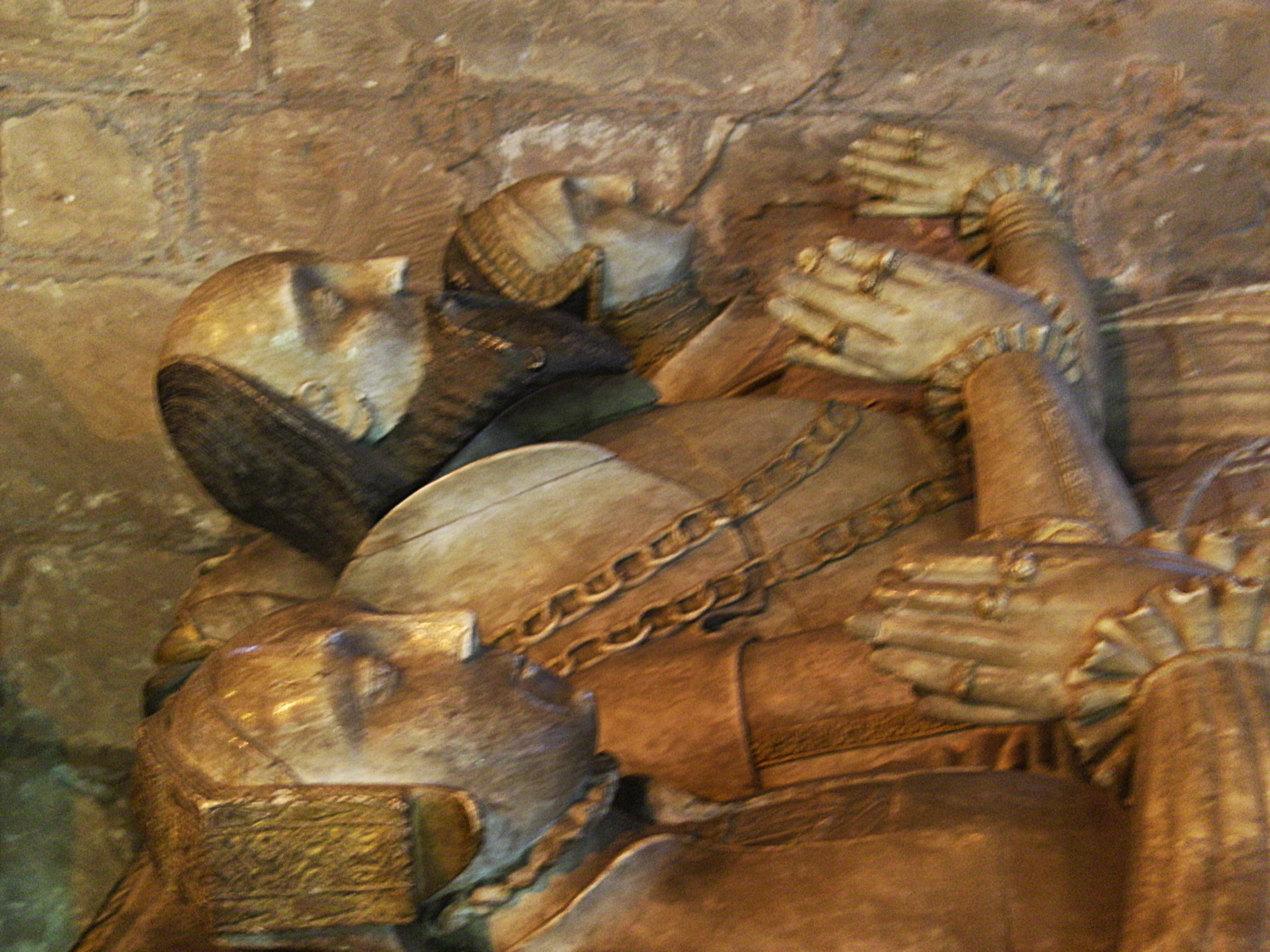
Sir Thomas Giffard and his wives, Dorothy Montgomery and Ursula Throckmorton, as portrayed on their tomb in Brewood parish church, Staffordshire.

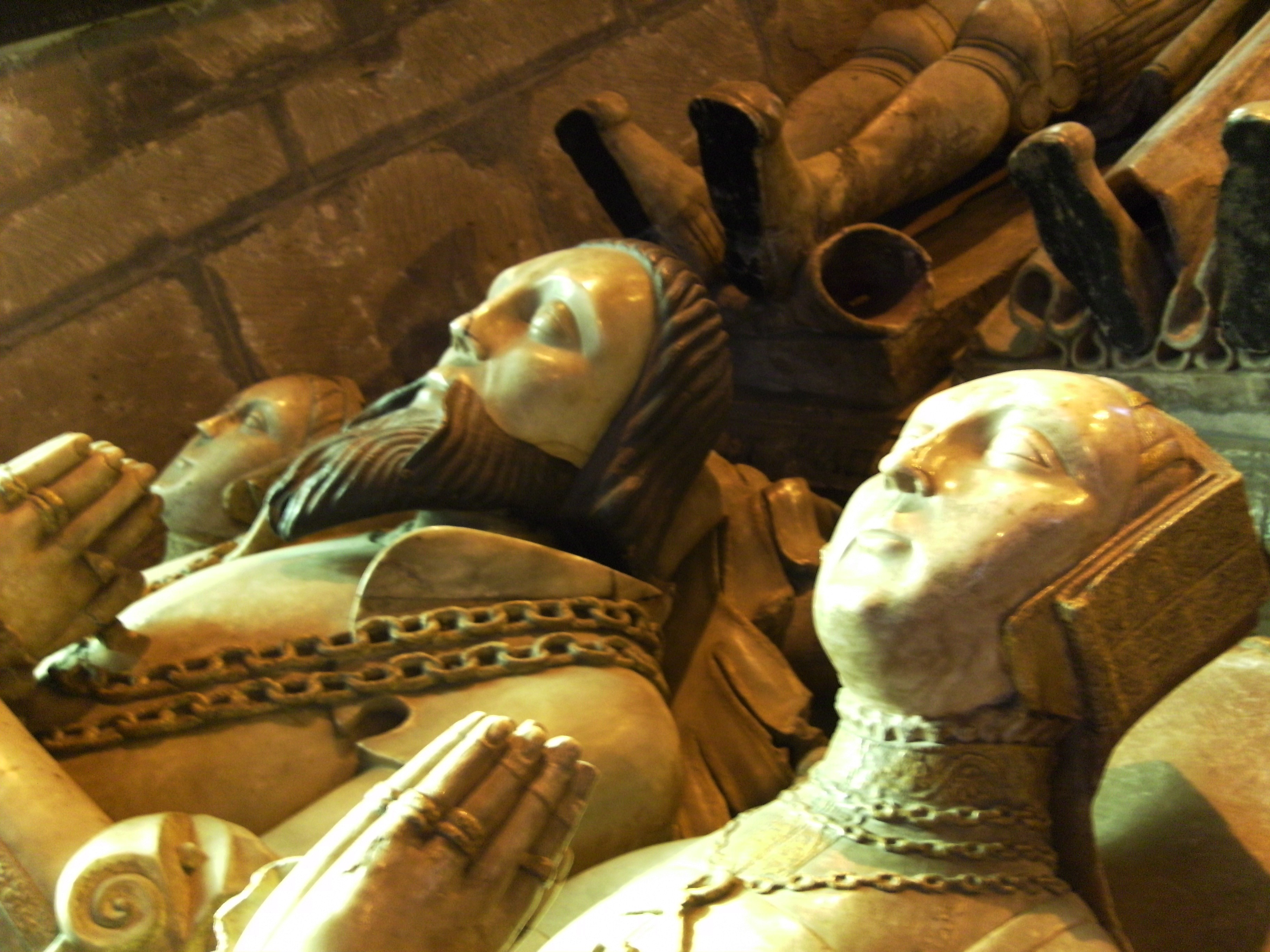
Sir John Giffard, Thomas Giffard's father, with his wives, Jane, Thomas's mother and Elizabeth, Thomas's mother-in-law. From their alabaster tomb in Brewood parish church.

Sir Thomas Giffard (c.1491 – 27 May 1560) was a Tudor courtier, Staffordshire landowner and Member of the English Parliament.

== Background and early life ==
Thomas Giffard's father was Sir John Giffard of Chillington Hall, near Brewood, Staffordshire. Sir John was a notable courtier and soldier, as well as one of the county's wealthiest landowners, and his family had lived at Chillington since the late 12th century. Thomas Giffard's mother was Jane Horde, daughter of Thomas Horde, the most important landowner in the Bridgnorth area. She died in childbirth in 1491, within a short time of his birth, although, as his exact birth date is not known, it is unclear whether it was while giving birth to him or a subsequent child.

Giffard received a brief legal education. Initially he was at the Strand Inn, one of the Inns of Chancery attached to the Middle Temple. On 11 November 1512 he was admitted to the Inner Temple.

His father remarried by 1515 to Elizabeth Gresley, widow of Sir John Montgomery of Cubley, Derbyshire. At the same time or a little later, Thomas Giffard married his step-mother's daughter, Dorothy, who was about two years younger than himself. As Dorothy was the heir to the Montgomery estates, Giffard was able to set himself up in modest comfort and security, independently of his father.

== Landowner ==
Thomas Giffard, despite his own longevity, was to outlive his father by only four years, so it was particularly fortunate for him to acquire property young. In his first wife's right, he was lord of Cubley itself and also Caverswall, a small manor to the north-east of Stafford, on the edge of the Staffordshire moorlands. The couple settled at Caverswall Castle, and this was to remain Giffard's main home, even after his wife's death, which was by 1529, as this was the year of his second marriage.

However, Giffard did not content himself with waiting to inherit the family estates. He was Escheator for Staffordshire in 1523–24. Thereafter he sought positions managing the estates of other major landowners. He became bailiff and custodian of Brewood Park, a major part of the Bishop of Coventry and Lichfield's land in Brewood parish. For this he was receiving £5 0s. 8d. in 1535. The sum was not huge but for ambitious landed gentry such posts were a foot in the door: later, the Giffards would become not merely keepers but tenants of the park and able to profit more amply from managing it. Giffard also took on a similar post at the manor of Shenstone, Staffordshire.

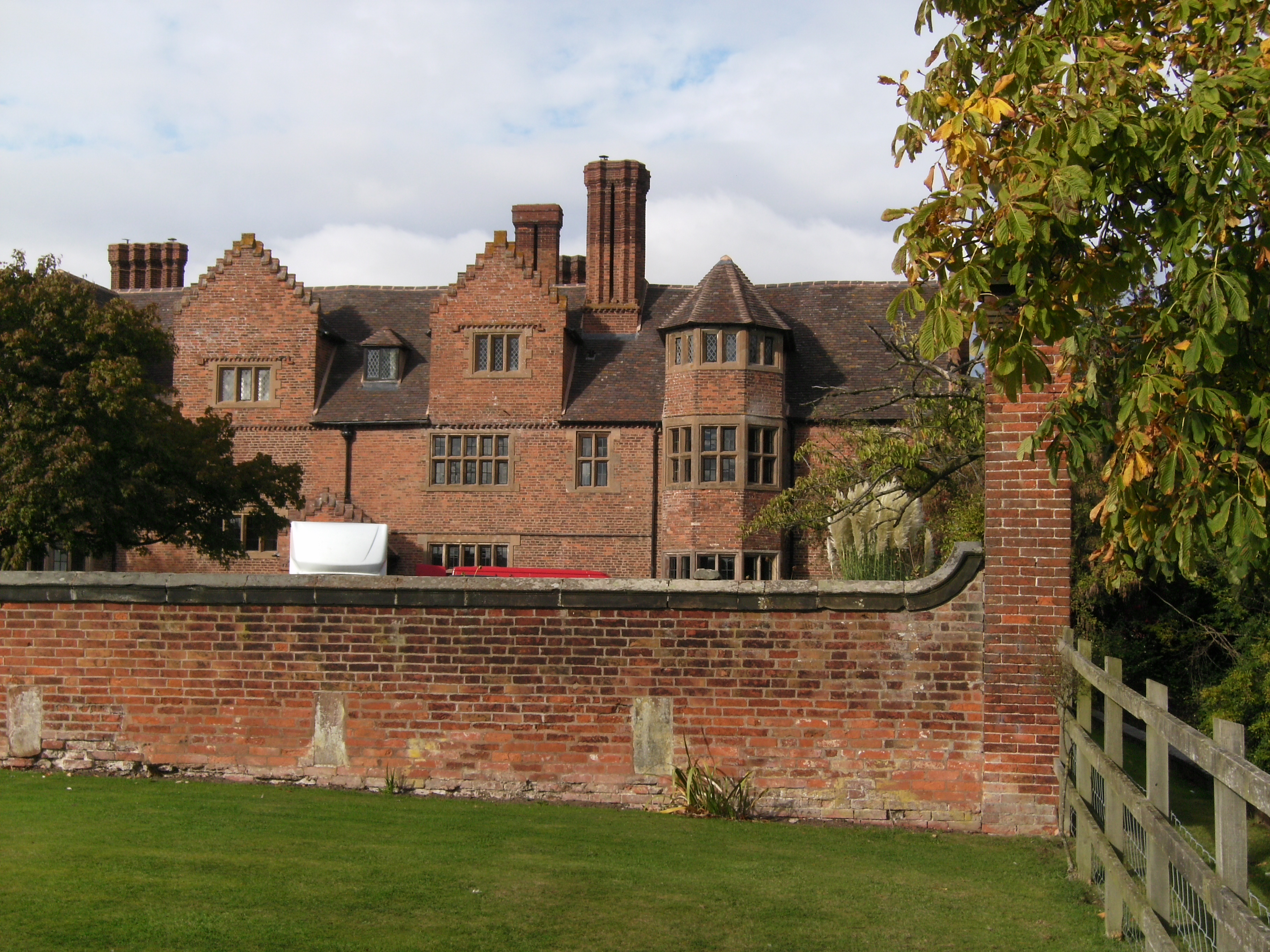
Black Ladies today: a large private residence incorporating 16th and 17th century structures erected by the Giffard family after the dissolution of the priory.

The passing of the Dissolution of the Lesser Monasteries Act in 1536 brought further opportunities, opening up a wide range of small properties for landowners and entrepreneurs at Giffard's level. Soon he was bidding for Black Ladies Priory, a dissolved nunnery to the west of Brewood. Sir Edward Littleton, his contemporary and neighbour at Pillaton Hall was a competitor, with Bishop Rowland Lee on his side. The matter was referred to Thomas Cromwell, who decided in favour of Thomas Giffard, described as "of Stretton", a manor on the southern edge of Penkridge and close to Black Ladies, which he had taken on by this time. Giffard paid £134 1s. 8d. for the property, which consisted of the site and grounds of the priory building itself, including the church and churchyard a water-mill, together with a tract of grazing land in Brewood – all valued at £7 9s. 1d. a year. He built a new house on the site and seems to have moved to live in it. After his father's death, he leased Black Ladies to Humphrey, a younger son, although the reversion remained with John Giffard, his heir.

Sir Thomas Giffard was sufficiently prominent, even before inheriting the family estates, to be pricked High Sheriff of Staffordshire three times: 1529–30, 1547–8, and 1553–4. He was a Justice of the Peace for Staffordshire from 1532 until his death. He inherited the Giffard estates only in 1556. As son and heir, he obtained the lordships of Chillington, Marston, Plardiwick near Gnosall and Walton in Eccleshall, and as a lessee of the Crown the lordship of Pattingham. Together with his own substantial estates, all this made him, for a short time, a very wealthy man.

== Courtier ==
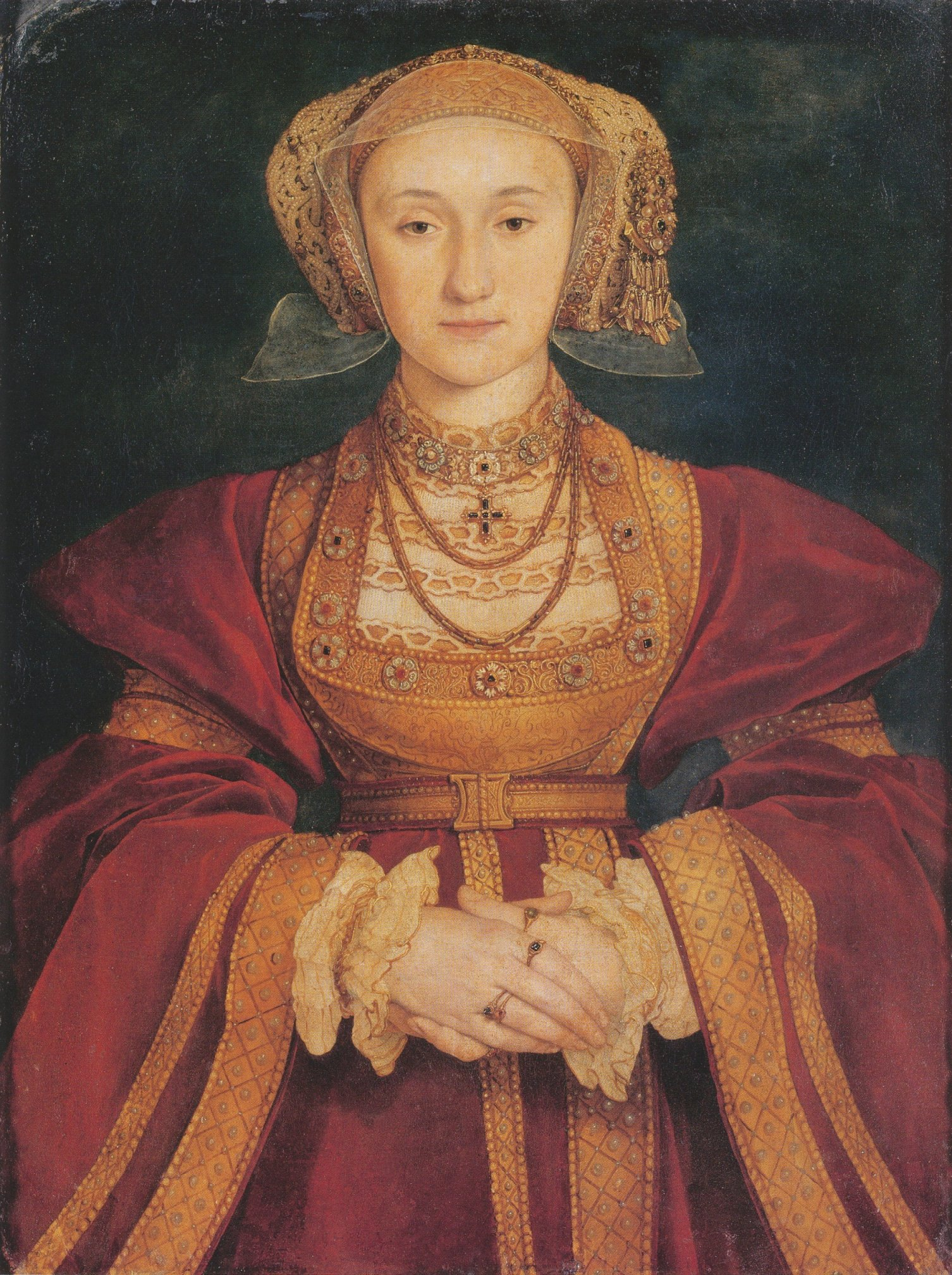
Anne of Cleves by Hans Holbein the Younger, c. 1539. The festivities marking her arrival were a high point in Giffard's career at Court.

Like his father, Giffard was frequently at the royal court, where he had attained the post of Gentleman Usher of the Privy Chamber by 1533 and held it until his death. As a close confidant of the king, he was honoured further by being made Ranger of Cannock forest jointly with his father.

Sometimes Thomas worked with his father in the royal service. In 1539 they were sent to make ready the castles at Dover and Sittingbourne for the arrival of Anne of Cleves, on her way to meet the king at Blackheath, although the king actually surprised her by appearing in disguise at Rochester.

Like other courtiers, he also proved his loyalty by taking up arms on the king's behalf. In 1544, aged at least 53, he enlisted in an army of 40,000 under the dukes of Norfolk and Suffolk to invade in northern France, as part of the Italian War of 1542–1546. However, the campaign became bogged down in protracted sieges and ended inconclusively after a few months, when Charles V, Henry VIII's main ally in the war, made a separate peace.

== Parliamentary career ==
Giffard was returned to the English parliament for the first time in 1539 as one of the knights of the shire for Staffordshire. The other member was Edward Littleton, already an experienced parliamentarian. The parliament lasted for just over a year and its main business was to pass the Second Act of Dissolution, which dealt with the larger monasteries.

After this, Giffard was not elected to parliament again until October 1553, the first parliament of Mary I's reign. The obvious reason would be his known religious conservatism. This was shared not only with his father, but also his colleague, Littleton, and he too was out of parliament until October 1553. However, Giffard was not out of favour with Edward VI or his governments. In fact he was knighted on 22 February 1547, just two days after the new king was crowned. It is more likely that the local political situation was the reason. Elections were becoming more competitive and that it was simply harder to secure a seat.

The election of 7 September 1553 resulted in Giffard's being "chosen by every man's voice": literally true, as an acclamation or voice vote was used unless the closeness of the voting necessitated a poll. Baron Stafford was determined to have his son, Henry, win the other seat and claimed victory. Littleton therefore demanded a count and was found to have a large majority, but the dispute still went as far as Stephen Gardiner, the Lord Chancellor, before Littleton could join Giffard again as MP for the county. The parliament lasted only two months and it was followed by two more brief parliaments in 1554. Giffard was not elected to either of them, and would have been unable to serve in the first, as he was Sheriff. However, the post did afford him the pleasure of returning his own son John as member for the borough of Stafford.

Giffard was returned again for the county late in 1555, once more with Littleton. Conservative by instinct, both tended to conform to whatever the regime demanded. Both were Catholic and neither was recognised by Elizabeth as a member who had "stood for the true religion" in the previous reign. Giffard, like Littleton, went along with Mary's legislation, ignoring any attempts to organise resistance. Unlike Littleton, however, Giffard outlived Mary's Counter-Reformation and was forced to make a decision when faced by the Elizabethan Religious Settlement. He seized the opportunity afforded by the new, Protestant queen's coronation to sue for pardon, thus decisively declaring for the Catholic cause – a fateful decision for the Giffard family, who were to remain recusant for many generations.

== Marriages and Family ==
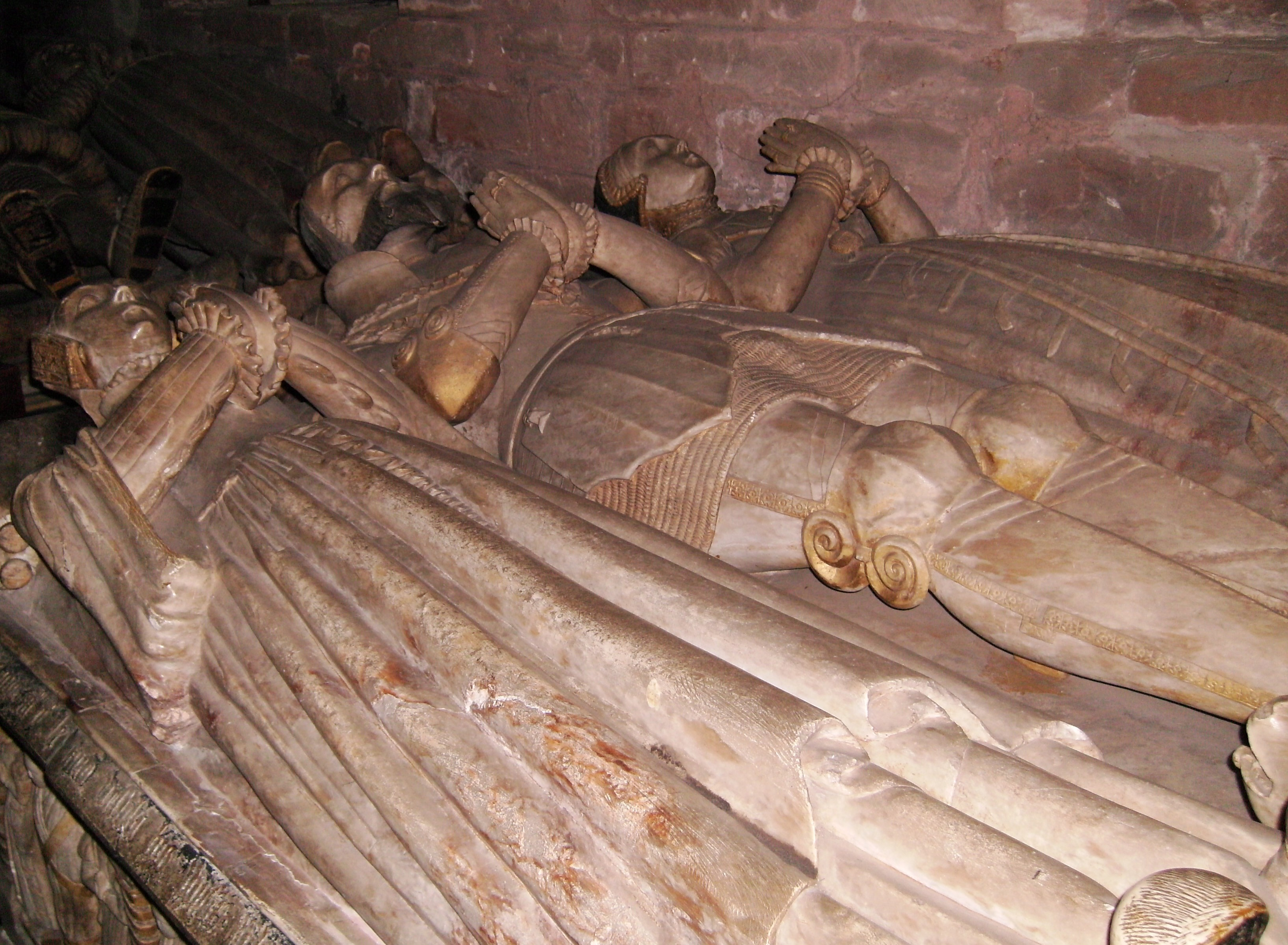
Sir Thomas Giffard, flanked by his wives, Dorothy and Ursula.

- Dorothy Montgomery was Thomas Giffard's first wife. She was the daughter and heiress of Sir John Montgomery of Cubley, Derbyshire and Elizabeth Gresley. He married Dorothy at, or shortly after, his father's second marriage to the widowed Elizabeth Gresley, around 1515. She brought him substantial estates in Staffordshire and Derbyshire. Dorothy had died by 1529. They had at least one surviving child, a daughter named Elizabeth, but no male heir.
- Ursula Throckmorton was Giffard's second wife. She was the daughter of Robert Throckmorton of Coughton Court, Warwickshire, and Elizabeth Baynham. Her brother, George Throckmorton, was an MP and prominent politician of strongly Catholic sympathies. Giffard had at least nine children with Ursula:

- John Giffard, Thomas's heir.
- Edward Giffard of White Ladies
- Humphrey Giffard
- Robert Giffard
- Dorothy Giffard
- Isabella Giffard
- Cassandra Giffard
- Elizabeth Giffard
- Anne Giffard

Sir Thomas died on 27 May 1560 and was buried in Brewood parish church. An impressive tomb was later constructed, with life-sized effigies of himself and both his wives.
