= Albrighton =

Albrighton may refer to:

- Albrighton, east Shropshire, a large village and civil parish in Shropshire, north-west of Wolverhampton, England
- Albrighton, Pimhill, a small village in North Shropshire, England, north of Shrewsbury
- Albrighton Hunt, a British foxhound pack
- Albrighton (surname)
- HMS Albrighton a Hunt-class destroyer
