= AWH =

AWH may refer to:

- Albrighton Woodland Hunt, a United Kingdom fox hunt
- AWH (railway station), an Australian Easy Access railway station
- AWH Engineering College, a private Indian college
