= Brewood Priory =

Brewood Priory may refer to:

- Black Ladies Priory, a Benedictine priory in Brewood, Staffordshire, England
- White Ladies Priory, also known as Priory of St Leonard at Brewood, in Shropshire, England
