= Listed buildings in Brewood and Coven =

Brewood and Coven is a civil parish in the district of South Staffordshire, Staffordshire, England. It contains 137 listed buildings that are recorded in the National Heritage List for England. Of these, three are listed at Grade I, the highest of the three grades, eleven are at Grade II*, the middle grade, and the others are at Grade II, the lowest grade. The parish contains the villages of Brewood, Coven, and Bishops Wood and the surrounding area. In the parish are three country houses, which are listed together with buildings in their grounds and estates. Two canals run through the parish, the Shropshire Union Canal and the Staffordshire and Worcestershire Canal, and the listed buildings associated with these are bridges, mileposts, and an aqueduct. Most of the other listed buildings are houses and associated structures, cottages, farmhouses, farm buildings, shops and offices, the earlier of which are timber framed or have timber framed cores. The other listed buildings include churches and associated structures, monuments in a churchyard, a holy well, road bridges, a public house, a war memorial, and a telephone kiosk.

== Key ==
| Grade | Criteria |
|---|---|
| I | Buildings of exceptional interest, sometimes considered to be internationally important |
| II* | Particularly important buildings of more than special interest |
| II | Buildings of national importance and special interest |

== Buildings ==
| Name and location | Photograph | Date | Notes | Grade |
|---|---|---|---|---|
| Church of St Mary and St Chad; 52.67556°N 2.17375°W | | Early 13th century | The church, which also contains 16th-century material was restored in 1878–80 by G. E. Street. It is built in stone with a tile roof, and consists of a nave, a north aisle, a south aisle, a narrower outer south aisle, a long chancel, and a west steeple. The steeple has a tower with diagonal buttresses, a west doorway with a four-centred arch, a Perpendicular west window, an embattled parapet with corner pinnacles, and a recessed spire. The chancel contains lancet windows, and the windows in the north aisle have Decorated tracery. | I |
| Old Smithy Cottage, 48 Dean Street; 52.67385°N 2.17202°W | | 14th century | Three cottages, later one house, the original part was a two-bay timber framed hall house. A timber framed bay was added to the north end in about 1600, followed by a rear wing in the 17th century, and a brick bay to the south in the early 18th century. There is a tile roof, two storeys, and the windows are casements. | II |
| Barn, Dean's Hall Farm; 52.67213°N 2.17239°W | — | Medieval | The barn was rebuilt in the 19th century. It is in brick with a timber framed core and cruck construction. There is a corrugated iron roof, the barn contains double doors and ventilation holes, and inside there are three cruck trusses. | II |
| 7 and 9 Bargate Street; 52.67718°N 2.17442°W | — | 15th century | A house that has been considerably altered, it has a timber framed core, encased in brick, and with a tile roof. There are two storeys, two bays, a single-bay rear wing and a lean-to at the rear. Inside, there is complex timber framing. | II |
| Swan Hotel; 52.67679°N 2.17395°W | | 15th century (probable) | A house, later a public house, it has a timber framed core with cruck construction, and is rendered with a tile roof. There are two storeys, and a front of five bays, the middle three bays the hall range, the left bay has a gable with a coped verge, and the right bay is lower and placed obliquely. The windows in the hall range are casements, in the left bay is a carriage entrance in the ground floor and a tripartite sash window above, and in the right bay is a dormer. Inside there is exposed timber framing and three pairs of crucks. | II |
| Aspley Farmhouse; 52.66524°N 2.11766°W | — | 15th century | A manor house, later a farmhouse, with alterations in the 18th and 19th centuries. It has a timber framed core, the outer walls are rebuilt in brick, and the roof is tiled. The farmhouse has two storeys and an H-shaped plan, consisting of a three-bay hall range, and flanking projecting cross-wings that have gables with decorative fretted bargeboards. There is an angled bay window, and the other windows are casements. Inside, there is exposed timber framing and an inglenook fireplace. | II |
| Grange Farmhouse, Coven; 52.65910°N 2.13452°W | | Late 16th century | The farmhouse, which was later altered, is timber framed, and the alterations are in brick painted to resemble timber framing. The roof is tiled, and there is a T-shaped plan, consisting of a main range with one storey and an attic, and two bays, and a projecting gabled and jettied cross-wing to the right with two storeys and an attic. The windows are casements, and in the main range are two gabled dormers. | II |
| The Ferns, 14 Dean Street; 52.67489°N 2.17381°W | — | c. 1600 | The house, which was later altered, has a timber framed core, and has been refronted in painted brick. It has a tile roof. one storey and an attic, and two bays. In the centre is a gabled hood on brackets, the windows are casements, and there are two large gabled dormers. | II |
| Black Ladies Priory; 52.68149°N 2.22685°W | | Late 16th or early 17th century | A country house incorporating the remains of a Benedictine nunnery. It is in red brick with stone dressings and a tile roof with crow-stepped gables. There are two storeys and an attic, the front is flanked by three-storey octagonal turrets with hipped roofs, and there is a T-shaped plan with a front range and a long rear service wing. In the centre is a porch, the windows are mullioned and transomed, and irregularly placed, and there are two dormers. | II* |
| Tudor barn, Black Ladies Priory; 52.68184°N 2.22691°W | — | Early 17th century | A stable block, later converted for residential use, it is in brick with stone dressings, dentilled eaves, and a tile roof with coped verges. There are two storeys and five bays. The windows are casements with mullions, and the doorway is recessed with a segmental arch. | II |
| 3 Chillington Street; 52.65689°N 2.18964°W | — | 17th century | A timber framed cottage, partly rebuilt in brick, with a thatched roof, it has one storey and an attic, two bays, and a single-storey extension on the left. The windows are two-light casements, and the roof sweeps over an attic dormer. | II |
| 30 Dean Street; 52.67451°N 2.17308°W | — | 17th century | A timber framed house with a tile roof. There are two storeys, a hall range of three bays and a projecting gabled cross-wing on the right. The windows are casements, and there is a brick link in the angle of the cross-wing. | II |
| 11 and 12 Market Place; 52.67653°N 2.17407°W | — | 17th century | A house that was remodelled in the early 19th century, and converted into a shop, it has a timber framed core with a plastered front and a tile roof. There are two storeys and an attic, and four bays. In the ground floor are two bay windows flanking a doorway with a fascia above them. To the left is a sash window and a passage entry further to the left. The upper floor contains sash windows with segmental heads and keyblocks, and there are four dormers with hipped roofs. | II |
| 13 and 14 Market Place; 52.67664°N 2.17398°W | — | 17th century (probable) | A house that was remodelled in the 18th century, and converted into two shops. It has a timber framed core fronted in red brick, with a moulded eaves course, and a tile roof. There are two storeys and four bays. In the ground floor are two Victorian shop fronts, and the upper floor contains sash windows with segmental heads and raised keystones. | II |
| 17 and 19 Newport Street; 52.67659°N 2.17590°W | — | 17th century | A pair of houses with a timber framed core, encased in brick and roughcast, with a floor band, and a tile roof wit coped verges on kneelers. There are two storeys and an attic, and a T-shaped plan with a front of two bays. There is a doorway in the angle, and the windows are sashes. Inside there is exposed timber framing and an inglenook fireplace. | II |
| 2 School Road; 52.67672°N 2.17609°W | | 17th century | A timber framed house with a clay roof, it has two storeys and attic, and two bays. The house contains a 20th-century door and 20th-century casement windows. | II |
| 4 Shop Lane; 52.67849°N 2.17321°W | — | 17th century | Two cottages, remodelled in the 18th century, and combined into one house. It has a timber framed core, the outer walls replaced in painted brick, and it has a floor band, a dentilled eaves course, and a tile roof. There are two storeys, and three bays. The windows are casements, and inside the house is exposed timber framing. | II |
| 9 and 11 Stafford Street; 52.67741°N 2.17346°W | — | 17th century | A pair of houses with a timber framed core, encased in brick and stuccoed at the front, with a floor band, coved eaves, and tile roofs. There are two storeys, an L-shaped plan, and a front of six bays. The windows are a mix of sashes and casements, and one of the doorways has fluted pilasters, and a moulded entablature. | II |
| Barn Cottages, Chillington Street; 52.65848°N 2.18177°W | — | 17th century | A pair of cottages that were remodelled in the 19th century. They are timber framed with brick infill, partly rebuilt in brick, and with a tile roof. There are two storeys, four bays, and a single-storey lean-to on the right. On the front are two doorways, and the windows are casements. | II |
| Dean End and Wood End, 38 and 40 Dean Street; 52.67429°N 2.17276°W | — | 17th century | A house, extended in the 18th century, and divided into two dwellings, it has a timber framed core, partly replaced in brick, the extension is in brick, and all is roughcast. There are two storeys, the house originally had a two-bay hall range and a rear wing, and a projecting wing was later added to the left. The door has a flat bracketed hood, and the windows in the original part are casements with hood moulds. On the left wing is a two-storey canted bay window. The windows in the wing are tripartite sashes, the outer lights with elliptical heads, and the middle lights with cusped heads. | II |
| Dean's Hall Farmhouse; 52.67226°N 2.17305°W | — | 17th century | The oldest part is the rear wing, which was timber framed and later rebuilt in brick. The rest of the farmhouse dates from about 1700 and is in red brick with pilaster strips in the centre and at the ends and a tile roof. There are two storeys, a roughly L-shaped plan, and three bays. In the centre is a doorway, the windows are sashes, and above the doorway and the ground floor windows is a continuous hood mould. | II |
| Deanery Cottage, 34 Dean Street; 52.67444°N 2.17299°W | — | 17th century | The cottage, which has been altered, has a timber framed core, a plastered brick front, a roughcast brick dentilled eaves course, and a tile roof. There is one storey and an attic, and two bays. In the centre is a gabled hood on brackets, the windows are casements, and there are two large gabled dormers with shaped bargeboards. | II |
| Greenoaks; 52.67751°N 2.21270°W | — | 17th century | The cottage was later extended. The early part is timber framed with brick infill, the extensions are in painted and rendered brick, and the roof is tiled. There is one storey and attics, the original part to the left has two bays, the extension has a dentilled eaves cornice, and there is a lean-to further to the right. On the front is a gabled porch, the windows are casements with lattice glazing, and there are two gabled dormers. Inside, there is an inglenook fireplace. | II |
| Horsebrook Manor Barn; 52.69120°N 2.17423°W | — | 17th century | The barn is timber framed and has been altered. It has a tile roof and three bays, and it contains double-leaved doors. (Note: Street View in May 2009 shows that the barn has been converted for residential use.) | II |
| Keepers Cottage, 1 Chillington Street; 52.65731°N 2.19320°W | | 17th century | The cottage is timber framed and roughcast with a thatched roof. There is one storey and an attic, three bays, and a single-storey extension to the right. On the front is a gabled porch, the windows are two-light casements, and the roof sweeps over three attic dormers. | II |
| Leper House; 52.64276°N 2.19695°W | — | 17th century | A farmhouse that was partly rebuilt and extended in the 18th century, it is timber framed with rebuilding in brick, and has a tile roof. The main range has one storey and an attic and two bays, and the extensions, which have two storeys, form a T-shaped plan. The windows are casements with segmental heads, and inside there is an inglenook fireplace. | II |
| Barn east of Leper House; 52.64255°N 2.19643°W | — | 17th century | The barn is timber framed on a sandstone plinth, partly rebuilt in brick, and with a corrugated iron roof. There are four bays, and it contains board doors. | II |
| Old Smithy House, 46 Dean Street; 52.67389°N 2.17209°W | — | 17th century (probable) | The house was remodelled in the 18th century, it has a timber framed core, a painted brick front, and a tile roof. There are two storeys and four bays. Steps lead up to the doorway in the left bay, that has a fanlight and a bracketed canopy. The windows are sashes with louvred shutters. | II |
| The Old Hattons; 52.64475°N 2.16359°W | — | 17th century | A rendered farmhouse, possibly originally timber framed, with a tile roof. There are two storeys and a U-shaped plan, with a recessed centre bay, and large projecting gabled wings with floor bands. In the centre is a porch, on the ground floor of the right wing is an angled bay window, and the other windows are casements. | II |
| The Thatched Cottage; 52.67720°N 2.21016°W | — | 17th century | The cottage, which has been restored, is timber framed and has a thatched roof, hipped to the left. There is one storey and an attic, and three bays. The windows are casements, there is a bay window with a half-hipped roof, and the thatch sweeps over three dormers. | II |
| Brewood Hall, wall and gate piers 52.67568°N 2.16900°W | — | Late 17th century | The house is in brick and has a plain parapet with stone capping and a tile roof. There are two storeys and attic, and an H-shaped plan, consisting of a three-bay main range and flanking projecting two-bay gabled wings. In the centre is a porch, and the windows are sashes. On the front of each wing is a plaque, one with a coat of arms and the other blank. A brick wall encloses three sides of the garden, it is about 6 feet (1.8 m) high, and contains rusticated gate piers with stone ball ornaments. | II |
| The Homage and Nicol House, Coven; 52.65817°N 2.13593°W | — | 1679 | A house, later divided into two, it is in brick with a floor band and a tile roof. There are two storeys, four bays, and a recessed extension to the north. In the centre is a gabled porch, and the windows are casements, two with segmental heads. | II |
| Dovecote and walls, Dean's Hall Farm; 52.67203°N 2.17259°W | — | c. 1700 | The dovecote and garden walls are in red brick. The dovecote has a rectangular plan, dentilled eaves and a hipped tile roof, and it contains a semicircular recessed arch. The walls have stone coping. | II |
| 25A Newport Street; 52.67677°N 2.17623°W | — | Late 17th or early 18th century | A cottage that has been partly demolished, it is timber framed with a tile roof. There is one storey and an attic, and one bay. The windows are casements, and there are two gabled dormers. | II |
| Westgate, Dean Street, walls and gate piers 52.67501°N 2.17412°W | | 1723 | A house in early Georgian style, built in red brick with stone dressings, bands, and a tile roof. There are two storeys and a concealed attic, a front of five bays, and a later projecting gabled extension on the right. The central doorway has a moulded architrave, a fanlight, a frieze, and a cornice. The windows are sashes with raised keystones, and the window above the doorway has a shaped surround with console scrolls, and a keystone carved with a mask, and below it is a datestone. The extension has a bay window on metal brackets. The forecourt is enclosed by a brick wall with stone coping and gate piers. | II* |
| Chillington Hall; 52.65851°N 2.20284°W | | 1724 | The south front of the country house is the older part, probably by Francis Smith, and the east front was added in 1786–89 by Sir John Soane. The house is built in brick with stone dressings and has tile roofs. The south front has a moulded plinth, rusticated corner pilasters, a moulded cornice, and a balustraded parapet. There are three storeys and eight bays. The windows are sashes with moulded surrounds, raised keystones, and aprons. The east front also has a plinth, a moulded cornice, and a balustraded parapet. There are two storeys and an attic, three-storey outer wings, and nine bays between the wings. In front of the middle three bays, and approached by steps, is an unfluted ionic portico, with a pediment containing a coat of arms. The windows are sashes in architraves, and to the rear is a stable court with a west front of 15 bays containing casement windows. | I |
| 6 Market Place; 52.67652°N 2.17381°W | — | Early 18th century | A house, later a shop, that was remodelled in the 19th century. It is plastered with floor bands, and a valley roof, with slate at the front and tiles at the back. There are three storeys and three bays. In the ground floor is a doorway with fluted pilasters flanked by shop windows, the one on the right with a bow window, all under a fascia. The upper floors contain sash windows. | II |
| 24 and 26 Stafford Street; 52.67777°N 2.17283°W | — | Early 18th century | A pair of red brick houses painted at the front, with dentilled eaves and a tile roof. There are two storeys and three bays. Each of the left two bays contains a canted bay window, and the other windows are casements. | II |
| Bargate House, 35 Bargate Street; 52.67736°N 2.17652°W | — | Early 18th century | A brick house, painted at the front, with rusticated quoin pilasters, a floor band, moulded eaves, and a tile roof with coped verges. There are two storeys and four bays, and a single-storey extension to the left. The central projecting porch has an opening with an ogee head, the windows to the left are casements, and those to the right are sashes with cambered heads and keystones. The extension has a parapet, an angular bay window, and an entry on the left, and at the rear is a gabled stair turret. | II |
| Agricultural building, Brewood Hall; 52.67569°N 2.16851°W | — | Early 18th century | The building is in red brick with raised coped verges on kneelers and a slate roof. There are two storeys and four bays. The building contains two doors and four casement windows, one larger with a segmental head and a keystone, and the others with square heads. | II |
| Stable and Coach House Range, Chillington Hall; 52.65971°N 2.20609°W | — | Early 18th century | A double farmyard with a quadrangular plan divided by lower ranges. They are in red brick on a sandstone plinth with hipped tile roofs, and include stables, animal houses, a granary and a barn. | II* |
| The Chantry, 8 Dean Street; 52.67510°N 2.17430°W | — | Early 18th century | A red brick house with floor bands, a coved plastered eaves course, and a tile roof. There are two storeys and an attic, and five bays. The central doorway has Tuscan columns and a triangular pediment. The windows are sashes with segmental heads, and raised fluted keyblocks, and there are three dormers with hipped roofs. | II |
| The White House and railings, 11 Bargate Street; 52.67726°N 2.17454°W | — | Early 18th century | A brick house, painted on the front, with a moulded eaves cornice, and a tile roof with coped verges. There are two storeys, a double-depth plan, and three bays. The central doorway has a radial fanlight and an open pediment, and the windows are sashes with wedge lintels and keystones. At the rear is a 19th-century cast iron pump and a stone trough. The forecourt is enclosed by decorative cast iron railings. | II |
| Dovecote, Chillington Hall; 52.65943°N 2.20626°W | | c. 1730 | The dovecote is in the centre of the coach and stable courtyard. It has an octagonal plan, and is in red brick on a moulded plinth, with rusticated quoins, and a moulded cornice. The dovecote contains a doorway and sash windows, all with segmental heads and keyblocks. | II* |
| The Bowling Green Arch and Gates, Chillington Hall; 52.65857°N 2.20419°W | | c. 1730 | The arch is in the grounds of the hall and is in rusticated stone. In the centre is a moulded round arch springing from Doric capitals, flanked by fluted pilasters on pedestals. To the sides are round-headed niches containing statues, and above these are blind square panels. At the corners are rusticated pilasters, and at the top is a full Doric entablature and vases. The gates are in wrought iron. | II* |
| 9 Market Place; 52.67634°N 2.17423°W | — | Early to mid-18th century | A house, later a house and a shop, on a corner site, it is in painted brick, with a stone coved eaves cornice, and a tile roof, hipped to the right. There are two storeys and an attic, a front of five bays on Church Road and three on Newport Street. There is a modern shop front on Newport Street and in the right two bays on Church Road, and to the left in Church Road is a doorway. The windows are sashes with segmental heads and fluted keystones, and on Church Road are two hipped dormers. | II |
| The Old Deanery, railings, piers and gates, 36 Dean Street; 52.67439°N 2.17285°W | — | Early to mid-18th century | A red brick house with painted stone dressings on a moulded plinth with a hipped tile roof. It is in Provincial Baroque style, and framed by large corner piers and a full moulded entablature. There are two storeys and three bays. The central doorway has engaged Tuscan columns and a triangular pediment. The windows are sashes with raised surrounds and triangular pediments, the window above the doorway has a Gibbs surround. Enclosing the forecourt is a dwarf wall with wrought iron railings, end piers with modillion capping, and gates with finials on the gate posts. | II |
| The Whitehouse and farm buildings 52.64380°N 2.20872°W | | Early to mid-18th century | The farmhouse, built as an eyecatcher from Chillington Hall, is in red brick with stone dressings, and has a tile roof with coped verges. The front facing the hall has a Palladian front, with two storeys, a central block with three bays, a cornice, a central pediment, and ball finials. This is linked by a Tuscan colonnade to one-bay wings with pediments. The farmhouse has four bays, and the farm buildings include a granary, and timber framed and brick barns. | II* |
| 1, 5A, 5B, 5C, 7 and 7A Stafford Street; 52.67721°N 2.17371°W | | Mid-18th century | A terrace of five houses and a shop in red brick, with a stone coved eaves cornice, and a tile roof. There are two storeys and an attic, and a front of 14 bays. The windows are sashes with segmental plaster heads and a fluted keyblocks, and there are five dormers. | II |
| Bath Farmhouse; 52.66586°N 2.22125°W | — | 18th century | The farmhouse is in red brick with a tile roof, two storeys and three bays. In the centre is a doorway with an architrave, and the windows are casements that are spread unevenly. | II |
| Walls and gate piers, Black Ladies Priory; 52.68135°N 2.22626°W | | 18th century | The walls enclose the east, north and south sides of the garden. They are in brick with moulded stone capping, and are ramped up to square gate piers surmounted by ball finials. | II* |
| Bridge over Brantley Pool; 52.67337°N 2.14712°W | — | 18th century | The bridge crosses a pool in Somerford Park. It is in stone and consists of two semicircular arches. The bridge has a parapet of concrete pillars and metal rails. | II |
| Croft House, Coven; 52.65668°N 2.13349°W | — | 18th century | A house, later divided into flats, it is in red brick with a dentilled eaves course, the rear and sides are rendered, and it has a tile roof. There are two storeys, and an L-shaped plan with a front of three bays, and a rear extension. The doorway has Tuscan columns, panelled reveals, a fanlight, and a flat hood. The windows are sashes with shaped stone lintels. | II |
| Gate piers, gates and walls, Giffards Cross; 52.66450°N 2.17802°W | — | 18th century | The gate piers, gates and walls are in the grounds of Chillington Hall. There are four gate piers in rusticated stone with ball finials flanking a central double gate and two single outer gates. The gates are in cast iron, and there are flanking stone walls. | II |
| Grain Ridge and garden building 52.67672°N 2.17209°W | — | 18th century | Originally a malthouse, it was converted into a private dwelling in the 1930s. The house is in red brick with a dentilled cornice, and a tile roof, half-hipped at the east end. There are three storeys, five bays, the east bay wider and projecting, and a two-storey wing at the northeast corner. On the front is an open porch, most of the window are casements, in the middle floor are three oriel windows, and in the east bay is a four-light hipped dormer. In the wing is a segmental-arched doorway. In the garden is a former agricultural building with a single storey and an attic, and a rectangular plan. | II |
| Hyde Farmhouse; 52.66761°N 2.18822°W | — | Mid-18th century | The farmhouse stands within a moat, and is rendered, with a moulded eaves course and a tile roof. There are two storeys and five bays. Steps lead up to a central porch with fretted and shaped bargeboards, and the windows are sashes. | II |
| Walls, Leper Well; 52.64059°N 2.19313°W | — | 18th century (probable) | The walls lining the holy well are in brick, and there are two stone steps and a short elliptical channel leading to the well. The walls are also a Scheduled Monument. | II |
| Somerford Hall; 52.67135°N 2.14809°W | | Mid-18th century | A country house in Palladian style, stuccoed, with rusticated quoins, a moulded plinth and eaves, and a hipped slate roof. There are three storeys, and a main range of seven bays, the outer bays slightly recessed, and flanking pavilions. In the centre is a porch and a doorway with engaged Corinthian columns, a semi-elliptical fanlight, and a moulded entablature. The pavilions each has one storey, a Venetian window with Ionic pilasters, and a pediment with a ball finial. | II* |
| Speedwell Castle, 1 Bargate Street; 52.67692°N 2.17398°W | | Mid-18th century | A house in Batty Langley Gothic style, it is in red brick with a modillion cornice and parapet, and a hipped slate roof. There are three storeys and three bays. The central doorway has a portico with clustered banded columns, an ogee head, and a gnome in place of a finial. In the outer bays are three-storey canted bay windows with five lights on each floor. The lights either have ogee heads surmounted by acorns, or round heads with keystone, and all have patterned glazing. | II |
| The Ice House; 52.65337°N 2.19993°W | — | 18th century | The ice house is in the grounds of Chillington Hall. It is in brick, covered in earth, and has a conical plan. | II |
| The Old House, wall and railings 52.67674°N 2.17227°W | — | 18th century | The house is in red brick with a dentilled cornice and a tile roof. There are two storeys and an attic, three bays, and two rear ranges. In the centre is a doorway, and the windows on the front are mullioned, those in the ground floor also have transoms, and in the rear ranges are a bow window and casement windows. The front garden is enclosed by a low brick wall with iron railings. | II |
| Dean House, 13 Dean Street; 52.67502°N 2.17364°W | | Mid- to late 18th century | The house is in late Georgian style, and is built in red brick with a tile roof, hipped to the right. There are three storeys and three bays. Four steps lead up to the central doorway, which has a segmental-headed fanlight and a flat hood. The windows are sashes, in the outer bays they are tripartite, and the windows in the upper floors of the left bay are blocked. | II |
| Glenhouse, 8 Market Place; 52.67631°N 2.17405°W | — | Mid- to late 18th century | A house incorporating a shop, in red brick, the front plastered, and with a tile roof. There are three storeys and three bays. In the right bay is a Tuscan portico with fluted necking to the columns. The left bay contains a shop front, and the windows are sashes. | II |
| Gazebo, Somerford Hall; 52.67030°N 2.14843°W | — | Mid- to late 18th century | The gazebo or summer house is in the garden of the hall. It is in brick, partly painted, with sandstone dressings, and has an octagonal plan. Three of the sides are open with Gothick ogee aches that have clustered shafts and acanthus finials, and the building has a moulded cornice. | II |
| The Beeches, Coven; 52.65914°N 2.13525°W | — | Mid- to late 18th century | A red brick house with floor bands, a bracketed gutter, and a tile roof. There are three storeys and three bays. The windows are sashes, those in the lower two floors with stucco lintels and raised fluted keystones. | II |
| Bridge No. 71 (Cross Green Bridge); 52.65170°N 2.12662°W | | 1772 | The bridge carries the Old Stafford Road over the Staffordshire and Worcestershire Canal. It is in brick, it consists of a single elliptical arch, and has a stone coped parapet. | II |
| Joseph Phipps Memorial; 52.67574°N 2.17389°W | — | 1772 | The memorial is in the churchyard of the Church of St Mary and St Chad, and is to the memory of Joseph Phipps. It is a chest tomb in stone, and has panelled sides, corner pilasters with gadrooning at the bases, and a moulded cornice. | II |
| Chillington Park Lodge, walls and gate piers 52.64496°N 2.22873°W | | Late 18th century | The lodge at the entrance to the grounds of Chillington Hall is in yellow brick with a floor band, a dentilled eaves course, and a hipped slate roof. There are two storeys and three bays, the middle bay projecting under a pediment. In the middle bay is a recessed arch containing the doorway and a blind Diocletian window above, and the outer bays contain casement windows. The lodge is flanked by brick walls with stone coping, and to the right are gate piers. | II |
| Giffards Cross Lodge; 52.66481°N 2.17781°W | — | Late 18th century | The lodge at the entrance to the grounds of Chillington Hall is in red brick with a tile roof, and is in Palladian style. There are three bays, the middle bay projects and has two storeys and a pediment, and the outer bays are lean-tos with one storey. In the centre is a doorway, and the windows are casements with lintels. | II |
| Gunstone House, 15 Stafford Street; 52.67752°N 2.17338°W | — | Late 18th century | A house in red brick, plastered on the front, and with a tile roof. There are two storeys and three bays. The central doorway has fluted pilasters, a Doric entablature, and a triangular pediment on scrolled brackets, and the windows are sashes. | II |
| Harvington Birch Farmhouse; 52.67409°N 2.21881°W | — | Late 18th century | A red brick farmhouse with a dentilled eaves course and a tile roof. There are three storeys and three bays. In the centre is a flat-roofed porch and a doorway with a decorative architrave, and the windows are sashes with raised keystones. | II |
| Payne's Bridge; 52.64884°N 2.21105°W | | Late 18th century | The bridge, in the grounds of Chillington Hall, crosses The Canal as it leaves The Pool, and was designed by James Paine in Classical style. It is in stone, and consists of a single arch flanked by buttresses containing round-headed niches. In the spandrels are medallions, one with a carving of the head of the king. The bridge has a moulded cornice, the middle section is corbelled, the balustrade is in iron, and there are gates to the north. | II* |
| Rushall Hall; 52.67574°N 2.17585°W | — | Late 18th century | A house with a schoolroom added in 1856. It is in red brick with dentilled eaves and a tile roof. There are two storeys and an attic, and a symmetrical front of three bays, with the former schoolroom to the west. The windows are sashes with segmental heads and raised keystones, and there are two dormers. | II |
| Sham Bridge; 52.65604°N 2.21800°W | | Late 18th century | A feature in the garden of Chillington Hall, it is a weir imitating a bridge. It is in stone and consists of five semicircular arches. There is a pillar at each end with a shallow pyramidal cap, and a coped parapet on corbels. | II* |
| Sluice House; 52.65379°N 2.20069°W | — | Late 18th century | The sluice house is by the canal in the grounds of Chillington Hall, and is in brick with stone dressings. At the north end is an arched entrance with a modillion open pediment. | II |
| Somerford Grange; 52.67575°N 2.14911°W | — | Late 18th century | A farmhouse in red brick with floor bands, a moulded parapet band, and an embattled parapet. It is in Gothick style, and has three storeys and three bays. In the centre is a gabled porch, and the outer bays contain canted bay windows. The windows are sashes with Gothick surrounds. | II |
| The Garth, 27 Dean Street; 52.67448°N 2.17277°W | — | Late 18th century | A stuccoed house with an eaves band and a tile roof. There are two storeys and five bays. The central doorway has fluted pilasters and a rectangular fanlight. The windows are sashes; in the upper floor the windows in the middle and outer bays are blind. | II |
| Ruin of The Gothick Temple; 52.64694°N 2.21324°W | | Late 18th century | The former summer house in the grounds of Chillington Hall, which is in Gothick style, is now a ruin. It is in rendered red brick, and consists of an ogee arch with a moulded surround, flanked by two polygonal turrets containing blind pointed arches in square-headed panels. Above them is an enriched frieze and a moulded cornice. | II |
| The Grecian Temple; 52.64588°N 2.21717°W | | Late 18th century | A feature in the garden of Chillington Hall, it is in yellow brick with stone dressings, a coped parapet containing three panels, and a hipped slate roof with a central dome. There is one storey and five bays. A flight of steps in the middle three bays leads up to an Ionic portico with four columns, outer pilasters, and an entablature with a decorative frieze and a dentilled cornice. The windows are sashes, the outer ones with pediments, and flanked by columns. Above the windows are blind panels. | I |
| The Neo-Classical Temple; 52.65126°N 2.21562°W | | Late 18th century | A summer house in the grounds of Chillington Hall, it is in rendered brick with sandstone dressings and a slate roof. In front of it are four Roman Doric columns carrying an entablature with triglyphs and a triangular pediment. On the corners and the front of the body of the building are pilasters, in the centre is a round-headed doorway with a semicircular fanlight, and flanking it are sash windows. | II |
| Turner Family Memorial; 52.67577°N 2.17383°W | — | Late 18th century | The memorial is in the churchyard of the Church of St Mary and St Chad, and is to the memory of members of the Turner family. It is a chest tomb in stone, and has panels with moulded surrounds, fluted corner pilasters, and a moulded base and cornice. | II |
| Thomas Vaughton Memorial; 52.67556°N 2.17404°W | — | 1789 | The memorial is in the churchyard of the Church of St Mary and St Chad, and is to the memory of Thomas Vaughton. It is a chest tomb in stone, and has panelled sides, fluted corner pilasters, with gadrooning at the bases, and a moulded cornice. | II |
| Dean Street House, 44 Dean Street; 52.67407°N 2.17242°W | — | 1791 | A painted brick house with a dentilled cornice and a tile roof. There are two storeys, three bays, and a single-storey extension to the left. Steps lead up to the central doorway that has a flat hood on console brackets. In the outer bays are canted bay windows with dentilled cornices. The upper floor contains tripartite windows in the outer bays, and a blind single-light window in the middle bay, all with keyblocks. | II |
| Somerford Bridge; 52.68075°N 2.15686°W | | 1796 | The bridge carries Four Ashes Road over the River Penk. It is in stone, it consists of four segmental arches, and has angled buttresses with refuges at parapet level. | II |
| Former stable range and courtyard buildings, Somerford Hall; 52.67132°N 2.14893°W | — | Late 18th to early 19th century | The buildings include a stable range, storage areas, a dovecote, and workshops. They are in red brick with stone dressings and tile roofs. The main range has two storeys and eleven bays, the outer bays pedimented and containing clocks, and contains doorways and windows with wedge lintels; some are sashes and others are blocked. The dovecote has a square plan, and a pyramidal roof with an octagonal cupola. | II |
| Cow House northwest of Acorn Cottage; 52.68084°N 2.24456°W | — | c. 1818 | The cowhouse is in stone and has a tile roof with coped embattled and parapeted gable ends. It is in Gothic style, and has one storey. In the centre is a blocked entrance with a lintel and an arched tympanum flanked by arched windows. On the south side is an inscribed plaque. | II |
| Smith family Memorial; 52.67521°N 2.17388°W | — | c. 1822 | The memorial is in the churchyard of the Church of St Mary and St Chad, and is to the memory of members of the Smith family. It is a chest tomb in stone, and has panelled sides, fluted corner pilasters, and a moulded base and cornice. | II |
| 15 Stafford Street; 52.67759°N 2.17324°W | — | Early 19th century | A roughcast house with a tile roof and corner pilasters. There are two storeys and three bays. The central doorway has panelled pilasters, and a flat hood on consoles, and the windows are sashes. | II |
| Anslow Memorial; 52.67536°N 2.17398°W | — | Early 19th century | The memorial is in the churchyard of the Church of St Mary and St Chad, and is to the memory of members of the Anslow family. It is a pedestal tomb in stone, and has a square plan, a moulded base and cornice, and is surmounted by a flaming urn. | II |
| Brewood Post Office, 2 Market Place; 52.67688°N 2.17350°W | — | Early 19th century | A house, later a shop and post office, it is in red brick with a tile roof. The main block has three storeys and three bays. In the ground floor is a shop front, and the upper floors contain sash windows. To the right is a gabled two-storey single-bay wing with bands, a tripartite window in the ground floor with round-headed lights, and a lunette in the upper floor. | II |
| 3 and 4 Market Place and railings 52.67667°N 2.17360°W | — | Early 19th century | A house, later a shop and a house, it is stuccoed and has a tile roof. There are two storeys and six bays. No. 3 has a shop front in the ground floor, and No. 4 has a central doorway with a panelled architrave, a semicircular fanlight, and a flat hood hood on console brackets. The windows are sashes with projecting sills, and the window above the doorway of No. 4 is blind. The forecourt of No. 4 is enclosed by cast iron railings. | II |
| Wall and piers, Harvington Birch Farmhouse; 52.67388°N 2.21888°W | — | Early 19th century | The wall encloses the west and south sides of the garden to the south of the farmhouse. It is in stone, the west wall is about 5 feet (1.5 m) high and the south wall about 18 inches (460 mm) high. There are two gate piers on the west side and a single pier at the southwest corner. | II |
| Jackson's Bridge; 52.66284°N 2.14378°W | | Early 19th century | The bridge carries a road over the River Penk. It is in stone, and consists of a single semi-elliptical arch. The bridge has a projecting band and a plain parapet. | II |
| Milepost at SJ 874 104; 52.69181°N 2.18786°W | | Early 19th century | The milepost is on the towpath of the Shropshire Union Canal. It is in cast iron, and consists of a circular post with a domed top and a cambered plate with three panels indicating the distances to Nantwich, Autherley Junction, and Norbury Junction. | II |
| Milepost at SJ 891 060; 52.65198°N 2.16150°W | | Early 19th century | The milepost is on the towpath of the Shropshire Union Canal. It is in cast iron, and consists of a circular post with a domed top and a cambered plate with three panels indicating the distances to Nantwich, Autherley Junction, and Norbury Junction. | II |
| Dutch barn, Somerford Hall; 52.66997°N 2.15058°W | — | Early 19th century | The Dutch barn, used for the storage of hay, is in red brick with dentilled eaves and a tile roof. There is one storey, and seven bays. In each bay is a round-headed arch, there are similar arches in the gable ends, and patterned ventilation holes in all walls. | II |
| Kiddemore Green Farmhouse; 52.67691°N 2.20834°W | — | Early 19th century | A farmhouse, later a private house, in red brick with a tile roof. There are two storeys, a T-shaped plan, and a front of three bays. The central doorway has fluted pilasters and a flat hood, and the windows are casements with segmental heads. | II |
| The Lion Hotel; 52.67694°N 2.17362°W | | Early 19th century | The public house is stuccoed with a slate roof. There are three storeys and five bays; the left bay has a hipped roof, and there is a moulded parapet over the other bays. In the left bay is a bow window in the ground floor and sash windows above. In the right four bays are two round-headed doorways with fanlights and keystones, the right doorway blocked. The windows are sashes with segmental heads and keystones decorated with grapes, vine leaves and shells. The windows in the upper floors of the middle and right bays are blind, and that in the centre of the top floor contains clock face. | II |
| The White House, Somerford Park; 52.67165°N 2.15513°W | — | Early 19th century | A farmhouse, later a private house, it is red brick, plastered at the front and sides, with a tile roof. There are three storeys and three bays. In the centre is a Tuscan portico, and the windows are casements, those in the lower two floors with hood moulds. | II |
| Villa Farmhouse; 52.67823°N 2.21762°W | — | Early 19th century | The farmhouse was extended later in the century, and there are two blocks. The north block is in red brick and has a tile roof with coped verges. There are three storeys, and three bays, and the windows are casements with segmental heads and keyblocks. The south block is stuccoed and has a hipped slate roof. There are two storeys and three bays, the windows are sashes with shaped lintels, and there is a central Tuscan portico. | II |
| Robert Walker Memorial; 52.67583°N 2.17342°W | — | 1826 | The memorial is in the churchyard of the Church of St Mary and St Chad, and is to the memory of Robert Walker. It is a chest tomb in stone, and has Greek Revival panels on the sides, corner pilasters, and a moulded cornice. | II |
| John Bile Memorial; 52.67607°N 2.17305°W | — | 1829 | The memorial is in the churchyard of the Church of St Mary and St Chad, and is to the memory of John Bile. It is a chest tomb in stone, and has a moulded plinth and cornice, shaped panels with fluted fans in the corners, and fluted pilasters. | II |
| Bridge No. 5 (Upper Hattons Bridge); 52.63717°N 2.16398°W | | c. 1830 | An accommodation bridge over the Shropshire Union Canal. It is in stone and consists of a single semi-elliptical arch. The bridge has a raised keystone, a coped parapet and a parapet band. | II |
| Bridge No. 6 (Lower Hattons Bridge); 52.64408°N 2.16189°W | | c. 1830 | An accommodation bridge over the Shropshire Union Canal. It is in stone and consists of a single semi-elliptical arch. The bridge has a raised keystone, a coped parapet and a parapet band. | II |
| Bridge No. 7 (Hunting Bridge); 52.65079°N 2.16163°W | | c. 1830 | An accommodation bridge over the Shropshire Union Canal. It is in stone and consists of a single semi-elliptical arch. The bridge has a stone coped parapet and a parapet band. | II |
| Bridge No. 8 (Park Bridge); 52.65713°N 2.16157°W | | c. 1830 | An accommodation bridge over the Shropshire Union Canal. It is in stone and consists of a single semi-elliptical arch. The bridge has a raised keystone, a coped parapet and a parapet band. | II |
| Bridge No. 9 (Chillington Bridge); 52.66336°N 2.16410°W | | c. 1830 | An accommodation bridge over the Shropshire Union Canal. It is in brick and consists of a single round arch. The bridge has a stone coped parapet and a parapet band. | II |
| Bridge No. 10 (Avenue Bridge); 52.66562°N 2.16632°W | | c. 1830 | The bridge carries the approach to Chillington Hall over the Shropshire Union Canal. It is in brick and consists of a single stilted round arch flanked by pilasters. The bridge has a balustraded parapet on rounded corbels. | II |
| Bridge No. 11 (Giffard's Cross Bridge); 52.66978°N 2.17097°W | | c. 1830 | The bridge carries Watery Lane over the Shropshire Union Canal. It is in painted brick and consists of a single stilted round arch. The bridge has a coped parapet and a parapet band. | II |
| Bridge No. 12 (Dean's Hall Bridge); 52.67172°N 2.17448°W | | c. 1830 | The bridge carries a bridleway over the Shropshire Union Canal. It is in brick and consists of a single round arch. The bridge has a stone coped parapet and a parapet band. | II |
| Bridge No. 13 (School Bridge); 52.67490°N 2.17750°W | | c. 1830 | The bridge carries a bridleway over the Shropshire Union Canal. It is in brick and consists of a single arch. The bridge has a stone coped parapet and a parapet band. | II |
| Bridge No. 15 (Eskew Bridge); 52.68581°N 2.18415°W | | c. 1830 | The bridge carries a Shutt Green Lane over the Shropshire Union Canal. It is in brick and consists of a single dentilled skew arch. The bridge has a plain parapet and a parapet band. | II |
| Bridge No. 16 (Broomhall Bridge); 52.68740°N 2.18510°W | | c. 1830 | The bridge carries a bridleway over the Shropshire Union Canal. It is in brick and consists of a single semi-elliptical arch. The bridge has a plain parapet and a parapet band. | II |
| Stretton Bridge; 52.69423°N 2.15575°W | | c. 1830 | The bridge carries the A5 road over the River Penk. It is in chamfered and rusticated stone. The bridge consists of three segmental arches, with chamfered voussoirs and a moulded parapet. | II |
| Lewis Lawrence Memorial; 52.67570°N 2.17335°W | — | 1831 | The memorial is in the churchyard of the Church of St Mary and St Chad, and is to the memory of Lewis Lawrence. It is a pedestal tomb in stone, and consists of a vertical cube on a square plan. The tomb has a moulded base and cornice, and a stepped cap. | II |
| Belvide Round House and wall 52.69069°N 2.19514°W | — | c. 1833 | The round house is part of a system to control the water feeding the Shropshire Union Canal from the Belvide Reservoir. It was designed by Thomas Telford, and is a circular stone building with a cast iron dome. The building contains a pair of doors and a small square opening, and inside is valve equipment. The retaining wall has sloping wings and brick copings. | II* |
| St Mary's Church; 52.67758°N 2.17974°W | | 1833–34 | The church, which was designed by Augustus Pugin in Gothic style, is built in sandstone with slate roofs. It consists of a nave, north and south aisles, a south porch, a chancel with north and south chapels, a north sacristy, and a west steeple. The steeple has a two-stage tower, and a broach spire with two tiers of lucarnes, a finial and a weathervane. | II |
| St Mary's Church Hall; 52.67773°N 2.17968°W | — | c. 1833–34 | A school, later a church hall, designed by Augustus Pugin, it is in stone and has a slate roof with coped verges. There is one storey, and it contains two mullioned windows and a doorway with a pointed arch. | II |
| St. Mary's Primary School and Schoolhouse; 52.67804°N 2.18046°W | — | c. 1833–34 | The school and school house were designed by Augustus Pugin. They are in red brick with stone dressings, and tile roofs with coped verges. The school has one storey and three bays. In the centre is a projecting gabled porch, and the windows are casements. To the right and at right angles at the rear is a house that has two storeys and mullioned casements. | II |
| Chantry Cottage, 6 Dean Street; 52.67525°N 2.17454°W | — | Early to mid-19th century | Probably originally a coach house, later a private house, it is in red brick with a slate roof, and has two storeys and two bays. In the ground floor is a blocked carriage arch, two doorways and sash windows. The windows in the upper floor are casements, and all the windows have stone lintels. | II |
| Dawscroft House, 14 Bargate Street; 52.67760°N 2.17513°W | — | Early to mid-19th century | A red brick house with hipped slate roofs. The main block has two storeys and two bays, and contains sashes with shaped lintels. The right bay is angled and contains a doorway that has an Ionic surround with engaged columns and a full entablature, and a semicircular fanlight with a keyblock. The extension to the right has two storeys and an attic, and two bays, and contains sash windows, a top-hung casement and gabled dormers. | II |
| Lychgate and churchyard wall, St Mary's Church; 52.67741°N 2.17930°W | — | Early to mid-19th century | The lychgate consists of chamfered sandstone piers carrying a felted hipped roof. The walls on the east and south of the churchyard are also in sandstone, and have shaped stone coping. | II |
| Pearce Hay Farmhouse; 52.67485°N 2.23559°W | — | Early to mid-19th century | The farmhouse, which incorporates earlier material in the rear wing, is in red brick with a dentilled eaves cornice, and a hipped tile roof. There is timber framing with painted plaster infill in the rear wing. The farmhouse has three storeys and vaulted cellars, a front range of three bays, and a rear wing with two storeys and an attic and two bays. The windows are sashes with lintels grooved as voussoirs, in the left return are bay windows, and there are two gabled dormers in the rear wing. | II |
| The Beeches, 17 Bargate Street; 52.67719°N 2.17528°W | — | c. 1840 | A plastered house with a slate roof. There are two storeys and three bays, the outer bays projecting under pediments. The central porch is recessed and has a four-centred arch and an open pediment, and the windows are sashes. | II |
| Canal Aqueduct; 52.63054°N 2.16575°W | — | 1843 | The aqueduct carries the Shropshire Union Canal over the River Penk. It is in stone and consists of a single semi-elliptical arch. The bridge has rusticated voussoirs. | II |
| Canal Milepost north of Avenue Bridge; 52.66585°N 2.16645°W | | 1843 | The milepost is on the towpath of the Shropshire Union Canal. It is in cast iron, and has a T-shaped front divided into three panels indicating the distances to Nantwich, Autherley Junction, and Norbury Junction. | II |
| Canal Milepost north of Brewood Bridge; 52.67794°N 2.17917°W | | 1843 | The milepost is on the towpath of the Shropshire Union Canal. It is in cast iron, and has a T-shaped front divided into three panels indicating the distances to Nantwich, Autherley Junction, and Norbury Junction. | II |
| St John's Church, Bishops Wood; 52.68111°N 2.23694°W | | 1850 | The church, designed by G. T. Robinson, is in red sandstone with a tile roof. It has a cruciform plan, consisting of a nave, north and south transepts, a short chancel, and a southwest steeple. The steeple has a tower containing a south porch and a clock face, and is surmounted by a spire. The windows are lancets. | II |
| Unidentified Memorial; 52.67544°N 2.17348°W | — | c. 1850 | The memorial is in the churchyard of the Church of St Mary and St Chad, and its inscription is illegible. It is in stone and has an oblong plan. There is a central semicircular panel with roll moulding flanked by pilasters, and this is surmounted by a triangular pediment. | II |
| 2 Sandy Lane; 52.67671°N 2.17334°W | — | Mid-19th century | The building is in red brick with corner pilaster strips, rusticated in the lower parts, a dentilled and moulded cornice and a slate roof, hipped to the right. It is in Italianate style, and has one storey. The central round-headed doorway has rusticated pilasters, a keyblock, and a segmental open pediment on fluted brackets. The doorway is flanked by tripartite round-headed windows with keyblocks and surrounds continuing as bands. | II |
| Dutch barn, Chillington Hall; 52.66004°N 2.20635°W | — | Mid-19th century | The Dutch barn is in red brick with a tile roof. It has eight bays with open sides. On the east and west sides are piers rising to the eaves, and in the gable ends are round-headed arches and ventilation holes. | II |
| St Mary's Presbytery; 52.67763°N 2.18038°W | — | Mid-19th century | The presbytery, designed by Augustus Pugin, is in red brick with stone dressings and a tile roof. There are two storeys, a front of two bays, and a projecting gabled wing on the right. In the centre is a lean-to porch that has two-light mullioned windows with cambered heads. The other windows are also mullioned and contain casements. | II |
| Bridge over The Pool; 52.64922°N 2.22287°W | — | 19th century | The bridge crosses the western arm of The Pool in the grounds of Chillington Hall. It is in brick with stone abutments and consists of a single semi-elliptical arch. The bridge has a hood mould and cast iron railings, and is flanked by semicircular bartizans. | II |
| St Paul's Church, Coven; 52.65803°N 2.13185°W | | 1857 | The church, which was designed by Edward Banks, is in sandstone with tile roofs, and is in Gothic style. It has a cruciform plan, consisting of a nave, north and south transepts, a south porch, a chancel, and a southwest tower with a spirelet. | II |
| Brewood War Memorial; 52.67530°N 2.17424°W | | 1920–21 | The war memorial is in the churchyard of the Church of St Mary and St Chad, and was designed by W. D. Caröe. The memorial is in stone, and consists of a gabled Latin cross on a tapering hexagonal shaft. On the south face of the shaft is a niche containing a statue of Saint George and the Dragon in relief. The shaft is on a pedestal with a stepped base, and has an inscription and the names of those lost in the First World War. On the steps is a further inscription and the names of those lost in the Second World War. | II |
| Telephone kiosk, Bargate Street and Newport Street; 52.67732°N 2.17711°W | — | 1935 | A K6 type telephone kiosk, designed by Giles Gilbert Scott. Constructed in cast iron with a square plan and a dome, it has three unperforated crowns in the top panels. | II |
| Giffard's Cross; 52.66468°N 2.17775°W | | Uncertain | The cross is in wood. | II |

== Notes and references ==
=== Sources ===
- Historic England, "Church of St Mary and St Chad, Brewood and Coven (1060197)", National Heritage List for England
- Historic England, "Old Smithy Cottage, Brewood and Coven (1295164)", National Heritage List for England
- Historic England, "Barn approximately 50 yards South-east of Dean's Hall Farmhouse, Brewood and Coven (1060201)", National Heritage List for England
- Historic England, "Nos. 7 and 9 Bargate Street, Brewood and Coven (1188751)", National Heritage List for England
- Historic England, "Swan Hotel, Brewood and Coven (1039344)", National Heritage List for England
- Historic England, "Aspley Farmhouse, Brewood and Coven (1180120)", National Heritage List for England
- Historic England, "Grange Farmhouse, Brewood and Coven (1344649)", National Heritage List for England
- Historic England, "The Ferns, Brewood and Coven (1060203)", National Heritage List for England
- Historic England, "Black Ladies, Brewood and Coven (1039336)", National Heritage List for England
- Historic England, "Tudor Barn, Blackladies, Brewood and Coven (1374042)", National Heritage List for England
- Historic England, "No. 3 Chillington Street, Brewood and Coven (1344654)", National Heritage List for England
- Historic England, "No. 30 Dean Street, Brewood and Coven (1295177)", National Heritage List for England
- Historic England, "Nos. 11 and 12 Market Place, Brewood and Coven (1178367)", National Heritage List for England
- Historic England, "Nos. 13 and 14 Market Place, Brewood and Coven (1039343)", National Heritage List for England
- Historic England, "Nos. 17 and 19 Newport Street, Brewood and Coven (1295075)", National Heritage List for England
- Historic England, "No. 2 School Road, Brewood and Coven (1039346)", National Heritage List for England
- Historic England, "No. 4 Shop Lane, Brewood and Coven (1374049)", National Heritage List for England
- Historic England, "Nos. 9 and 11 Stafford Street, Brewood and Coven (1039315)", National Heritage List for England
- Historic England, "Barn Cottages, Brewood and Coven (1295236)", National Heritage List for England
- Historic England, "Dean End and Wood End, Brewood and Coven (1060205)", National Heritage List for England
- Historic England, "Dean's Hall Farmhouse, Brewood and Coven (1178137)", National Heritage List for England
- Historic England, "Deanery Cottage, Brewood and Coven (1060204)", National Heritage List for England
- Historic England, "Greenoaks, Brewood and Coven (1039340)", National Heritage List for England
- Historic England, "Horsebrook Manor Barn, Brewood and Coven (1060208)", National Heritage List for England
- Historic England, "Keepers Cottage, Brewood and Coven (1178041)", National Heritage List for England
- Historic England, "Leper House, Brewood and Coven (1374034)", National Heritage List for England
- Historic England, "Barn approximately 45 yards East of Leper House, Brewood and Coven (1039319)", National Heritage List for England
- Historic England, "Old Smithy House, Brewood and Coven (1060206)", National Heritage List for England
- Historic England, "The Old Hattons, Brewood and Coven (1039345)", National Heritage List for England
- Historic England, "The Thatched Cottage, Brewood and Coven (1178311)", National Heritage List for England
- Historic England, "Brewood Hall with garden wall and gate piers, Brewood and Coven (1039312)", National Heritage List for England
- Historic England, "The Homage and Nicol House, Brewood and Coven (1060190)", National Heritage List for England
- Historic England, "Dovecote and garden walls to South-east of Dean's Hall Farmhouse, Brewood and Coven (1178143)", National Heritage List for England
- Historic England, "No. 25A Newport Street, Brewood and Coven (1374047)", National Heritage List for England
- Historic England, "Westgate, forecourt wall and gate piers, Brewood and Coven (1060202)", National Heritage List for England
- Historic England, "Chillington Hall, Brewood and Coven (1060191)", National Heritage List for England
- Historic England, "No. 6 Market Place, Brewood and Coven (1039342)", National Heritage List for England
- Historic England, "Iona, Brewood and Coven (1039317)", National Heritage List for England
- Historic England, "Bargate House, Brewood and Coven (1060230)", National Heritage List for England
- Historic England, "Agricultural building approximately 10 yards East of Brewood Hall, Brewood and Coven (1039313)", National Heritage List for England
- Historic England, "Stable and Coach House Range (now partly farmbuildings), Brewood and Coven (1060193)", National Heritage List for England
- Historic England, "The Chantry, Brewood and Coven (1178166)", National Heritage List for England
- Historic England, "The White House and front railings, Brewood and Coven (1060229)", National Heritage List for England
- Historic England, "Dovecote in centre of coach and stable courtyard, Brewood and Coven (1295254)", National Heritage List for England
- Historic England, "The Bowling Green Arch and Gates, Brewood and Coven (1060192)", National Heritage List for England
- Historic England, "No. 9 Market Place, Brewood and Coven (1374046)", National Heritage List for England
- Historic England, "The Old Deanery and forecourt railings, flanking piers and gates, Brewood and Coven (1178197)", National Heritage List for England
- Historic England, "The Whitehouse and farm buildings to East, West and South, Brewood and Coven (1039320)", National Heritage List for England
- Historic England, "Nos. 1, 5A, 5B, 5C, 7 and 7A Stafford Street, Brewood and Coven (1039314)", National Heritage List for England
- Historic England, "Bath Farmhouse, Brewood and Coven (1344631)", National Heritage List for England
- Historic England, "Garden walls to East, North and South of Black Ladies, with gate piers, Brewood and Coven (1039337)", National Heritage List for England
- Historic England, "Bridge over Brantley Pool, Brewood and Coven (1180255)", National Heritage List for England
- Historic England, "Croft House, Brewood and Coven (1060189)", National Heritage List for England
- Historic England, "Gate piers, gates and adjoining walls to North and South at Giffards Cross, Brewood and Coven (1060194)", National Heritage List for England
- Historic England, "Grain Ridge, including garden building to the north, Brewood and Coven (1469021)", National Heritage List for England
- Historic England, "Hyde Farmhouse, Brewood and Coven (1060225)", National Heritage List for England
- Historic England, "Walls lining the Leper Well and steps approaching, Brewood and Coven (1180328)", National Heritage List for England
- Historic England, "Gunstone leper well, Brewood and Coven (1006058)", National Heritage List for England
- Historic England, "Somerford Hall, Brewood and Coven (1039352)", National Heritage List for England
- Historic England, "Speedwell Castle, Brewood and Coven (1060227)", National Heritage List for England
- Historic England, "The Ice House, Brewood and Coven (1344653)", National Heritage List for England
- Historic England, "The Old House, including low brick wall topped with iron railings to the front garden, Brewood and Coven (1470173)", National Heritage List for England
- Historic England, "Dean House, Brewood and Coven (1060207)", National Heritage List for England
- Historic England, "Glenhouse, Brewood and Coven (1178353)", National Heritage List for England
- Historic England, "Gazebo approximate;y 100 metres south of Somerford Hall, Brewood and Coven (1039309)", National Heritage List for England
- Historic England, "The Beeches, Brewood and Coven (1344648)", National Heritage List for England
- Historic England, "Staffordshire and Worcestershire Canal Bridge No. 71 (Cross Green Bridge), Brewood and Coven (1374033)", National Heritage List for England
- Historic England, "Joseph Phipps Memorial circa 15 yards north of North Aisle, Brewood and Coven (1295222)", National Heritage List for England
- Historic England, "Chillington Park Lodge with flanking walls and gate piers, Brewood and Coven (1294977)", National Heritage List for England
- Historic England, "Giffards Cross Lodge, Brewood and Coven (1295061)", National Heritage List for England
- Historic England, "Gunstone House, Brewood and Coven (1374032)", National Heritage List for England
- Historic England, "Harvington Birch Farmhouse, Brewood and Coven (1039333)", National Heritage List for England
- Historic England, "Payne's Bridge, Brewood and Coven (1060195)", National Heritage List for England
- Historic England, "Rushall Hall, Brewood and Coven (1295035)", National Heritage List for England
- Historic England, "Sham Bridge, Brewood and Coven (1060196)", National Heritage List for England
- Historic England, "Sluice House on Canal, Brewood and Coven (1344652)", National Heritage List for England
- Historic England, "Somerford Grange, Brewood and Coven (1039310)", National Heritage List for England
- Historic England, "The Garth, Brewood and Coven (1178244)", National Heritage List for England
- Historic England, "Ruin of The Gothick Temple, Brewood and Coven (1295265)", National Heritage List for England
- Historic England, "The Grecian Temple, Brewood and Coven (1295261)", National Heritage List for England
- Historic England, "The Neo-Classical Temple, Brewood and Coven (1178028)", National Heritage List for England
- Historic England, "Turner Family Memorial circa 15 yards north of North Aisle, Brewood and Coven (1344656)", National Heritage List for England
- Historic England, "Thomas Vaughton Memorial circa 1 yard north of West Tower, Brewood and Coven (1178118)", National Heritage List for England
- Historic England, "Dean Street House, Brewood and Coven (1178226)", National Heritage List for England
- Historic England, "Somerford Bridge, Brewood and Coven (1295192)", National Heritage List for England
- Historic England, "Former Stable Range and attached Courtyard Buildings immediately to the west of Somerford Hall, Brewood and Coven (1039269)", National Heritage List for England
- Historic England, "Cow House approximately 25 metres to North-West of Acorn Cottage, Brewood and Coven (1176695)", National Heritage List for England
- Historic England, "Smith Family Memorial circa 35 yards south of West Tower, Brewood and Coven (1060199)", National Heritage List for England
- Historic England, "No. 15 Stafford Street, Brewood and Coven (1039316)", National Heritage List for England
- Historic England, "Anslow Memorial approximately 15 yards south of West Tower, Brewood and Coven (1178086)", National Heritage List for England
- Historic England, "Brewood Post Office, Brewood and Coven (1374045)", National Heritage List for England
- Historic England, "Nos. 3 and 4 Market Place and forecourt railings, Brewood and Coven (1178336)", National Heritage List for England
- Historic England, "Garden Wall to West and South of front garden of Harvington Birch Farmhouse with gate piers and corner pier, Brewood and Coven (1039332)", National Heritage List for England
- Historic England, "Jackson's Bridge, Brewood and Coven (1344650)", National Heritage List for England
- Historic England, "Shropshire Union Canal Milepost at SJ 874 104, Brewood and Coven (1262417)", National Heritage List for England
- Historic England, "Shropshire Union Canal Milepost at SJ 891 060, Brewood and Coven (1039270)", National Heritage List for England
- Historic England, "Dutch barn approximately 250 yards south-west of Somerford Hall, Brewood and Coven (1039353)", National Heritage List for England
- Historic England, "Kiddemore Green Farmhouse, Brewood and Coven (1374044)", National Heritage List for England
- Historic England, "The Lion Hotel, Brewood and Coven (1178320)", National Heritage List for England
- Historic England, "The White House, Brewood and Coven (1039311)", National Heritage List for England
- Historic England, "Villa Farmhouse, Brewood and Coven (1039341)", National Heritage List for England
- Historic England, "Robert Walker Memorial circa 30 yards northeast of Chancel, Brewood and Coven (1060200)", National Heritage List for England
- Historic England, "John Bile Memorial circa 40 yards northeast of Chancel, Brewood and Coven (1344655)", National Heritage List for England
- Historic England, "Shropshire Union Canal Bridge No. 5 (Upper Hattons Bridge), Brewood and Coven (1039348)", National Heritage List for England
- Historic England, "Shropshire Union Canal Bridge No. 6 (Lower Hattons Bridge), Brewood and Coven (1180224)", National Heritage List for England
- Historic England, "Shropshire Union Canal Bridge No. 7 (Hunting Bridge), Brewood and Coven (1374050)", National Heritage List for England
- Historic England, "Shropshire Union Canal Bridge No. 8 (Park Bridge), Brewood and Coven (1295019)", National Heritage List for England
- Historic England, "Shropshire Union Canal Bridge No. 9 (Chillington Bridge), Brewood and Coven (1039349)", National Heritage List for England
- Historic England, "Shropshire Union Canal Bridge No. 10 (Avenue Bridge), Brewood and Coven (1180238)", National Heritage List for England
- Historic England, "Shropshire Union Canal Bridge No. 11 (Giffard's Cross Bridge), Brewood and Coven (1374011)", National Heritage List for England
- Historic England, "Shropshire Union Canal Bridge No. 12 (Dean's Hall Bridge), Brewood and Coven (1295027)", National Heritage List for England
- Historic England, "Shropshire Union Canal Bridge No. 13 (School Bridge), Brewood and Coven (1039350)", National Heritage List for England
- Historic England, "Shropshire Union Canal Bridge No. 15 (Eskew Bridge), Brewood and Coven (1294989)", National Heritage List for England
- Historic England, "Shropshire Union Canal Bridge No. 16 (Broomhall Bridge), Brewood and Coven (1039351)", National Heritage List for England
- Historic England, "Stretton Bridge over River Penk, Brewood and Coven (1039318)", National Heritage List for England
- Historic England, "Lewis Lawrence Memorial 3 yards east of North-east corner of Chancel, Brewood and Coven (1178099)", National Heritage List for England
- Historic England, "Shropshire Union Canal, Belvide Round House and retaining wall, Belvide Reservoir, at SJ 869103, Brewood and Coven (1252181)", National Heritage List for England
- Historic England, "Roman Catholic Church of St Mary, Brewood and Coven (1039334)", National Heritage List for England
- Historic England, "Church Hall approximately 1 yard north-east of Roman Catholic Church of St. Mary, Brewood and Coven (1039338)", National Heritage List for England
- Historic England, "St. Mary's Roman Catholic Primary School and Schoolhouse, Brewood and Coven (1039339)", National Heritage List for England
- Historic England, "Chantry Cottage, Brewood and Coven (1344658)", National Heritage List for England
- Historic England, "Dawscroft House, Brewood and Coven (1060188)", National Heritage List for England
- Historic England, "Lychgate and churchyard wall to East and South of Roman Catholic Church of St Mary, Brewood and Coven (1039335)", National Heritage List for England
- Historic England, "Pearce Hay Farmhouse, Brewood and Coven (1060226)", National Heritage List for England
- Historic England, "The Beeches, Brewood and Coven (1060228)", National Heritage List for England
- Historic England, "Shropshire Union Canal Aqueduct carrying canal over River Penk at N.G.R. SJ 8888103654, Brewood and Coven (1039305)", National Heritage List for England
- Historic England, "Shropshire Union Canal milepost approximately 40 yards north of Avenue Bridge (N.G.R. SJ 88839 07589), Brewood and Coven (1180249)", National Heritage List for England
- Historic England, "Shropshire Union Canal milepost approximately 50 yards north of Brewood Bridge (N.G.R. SJ 88000890), Brewood and Coven (1374012)", National Heritage List for England
- Historic England, "Church of St. John, Brewood and Coven (1178301)", National Heritage List for England
- Historic England, "Memorial circa 10 yards south of South Aisle, Brewood and Coven (1060198)", National Heritage List for England
- Historic England, "No. 2 Sandy Lane, Brewood and Coven (1295067)", National Heritage List for England
- Historic England, "Dutch Barn immediately north of Stable and Coach House Range, Brewood and Coven (1252185)", National Heritage List for England
- Historic England, "Presbytery approximately 50 yards north-west of Roman Catholic Church of St. Mary, Brewood and Coven (1374043)", National Heritage List for England
- Historic England, "Bridge on West side of The Pool, Brewood and Coven (1344651)", National Heritage List for England
- Historic England, "Church of St. Paul, Brewood and Coven (1344657)", National Heritage List for England
- Historic England, "Brewood War Memorial, in the churchyard of St Mary the Virgin and St Chad's church, Brewood and Coven (1391839)", National Heritage List for England
- Historic England, "K6 Telephone Kiosk at Junction of Bargate Street and Newport Street, Brewood and Coven (1039308)", National Heritage List for England
- Historic England, "Giffard's Cross approximately 10 yards South of Giffard's Cross Lodge, Brewood and Coven (1374048)", National Heritage List for England
- Historic England, Listed Buildings
- Pevsner, Nikolaus (1974), Staffordshire, The Buildings of England, Harmondsworth: Penguin Books, ISBN 0-14-071046-9
