= John Giffard (police officer) =

British police officer and aristocrat

John William Giffard (pronounced "Jiffard") CBE QPM (born 1951 or 1952) is a British retired police officer. Adopted into an aristocratic family that owns Chillington Hall, he joined Staffordshire Police in 1973 as a beat bobby. After serving as a staff officer to the chief constable and a divisional commander he moved to North Yorkshire Police in 1991 to take up a position as assistant chief constable. Giffard returned to Staffordshire Police in 1996 to become its chief constable, a role he held for ten years. As chief constable he reorganised the force's divisions and introduced the Major Investigations Department. During his tenure car theft and burglaries dropped and there were no undetected murders. Giffard also served on secondment to the Home Office to assist with a review into options to merge police forces in England and Wales. His work was recognised with the award of the Queen's Police Medal and appointment as a commander of the Order of the British Empire.

In retirement Giffard served as a vice-president of the Association of Chief Police Officers and trustee of the Staffordshire Police Cadets. After inheriting Chillington Hall Giffard carried out a programme of restoration that was recognised, in 2009, with the Historic Houses Association/Sotheby's Restoration Award.

== Early life ==
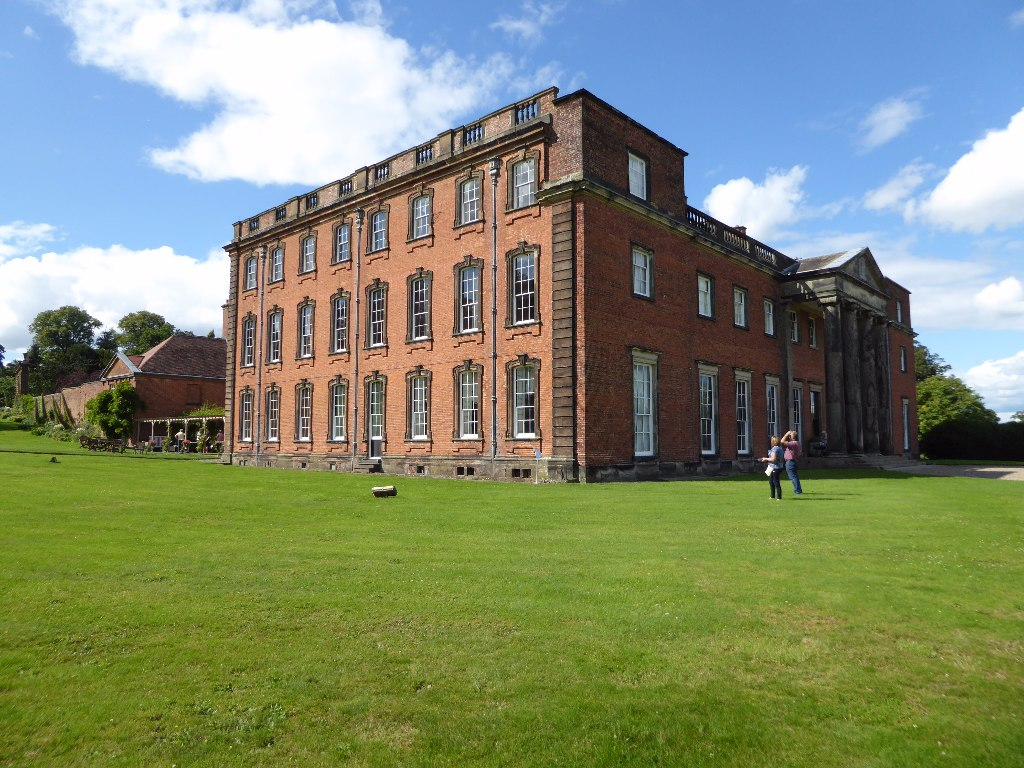
Chillington Hall

Giffard is the adopted son of Peter Richard de Longueville Giffard, of Chillington Hall, Staffordshire, and was born in 1951 or 1952. He was adopted as an infant and Christened at Holy Trinity Brompton on 24 July 1952. One of his godparents was the former soldier and future Conservative Party member of parliament Airey Neave.

The Giffard family have occupied Chillington Hall since 1178 and trace their lineage back to William of Gifford, a Norman knight that Professor Frank McLynn states was one of the men to kill Harold Godwinson at the Battle of Hastings in 1066. Giffard was educated at Eton College. He was also known by the nickname "Giff".

== Police career ==
Giffard joined Staffordshire Police in 1973, serving as a beat bobby in Stafford. Giffard became staff officer to the chief constable in 1984. In 1991 he was divisional commander at Cannock and later that year transferred to the North Yorkshire Police to become an assistant chief constable.

In 1996 Giffard returned to Staffordshire Police to take up the role of chief constable. In this role Giffard oversaw the reorganisation of the force's territorial divisions and, in 2003, introduced a Major Investigations Department. Giffard's work was recognised with the award of the Queen's Police Medal for distinguished service, on 14 June 1997. Upon the end of his seven-year tenure in 2002 the Home Office approved an extension for a further three years. Giffard was appointed a commander of the Order of the British Empire (CBE) in the 2003 New Year Honours for services to the police.

During his time as chief constable he was also a senior professional advisor to the Home Secretary. Giffard had been seconded to the Home Office in late 2005 to assist with a nationwide review of policing, the Police Structures Review Unit, which looked at options to merge neighbouring forces.

Giffard finally retired on 2 April 2006. At the time of his retirement he was the longest-serving chief constable in England and Wales. His tenure saw a significant drop in reported car theft and burglaries and the force was recognised as one of the best performing in the country. During Giffard's time as chief constable there were no undetected murders in the force area.

On retirement Giffard was appointed to the position of 1st vice-president of the Association of Chief Police Officers. In 2017 he was appointed to the board of trustees of the Staffordshire Police Cadets. The Staffordshire Police now awards the annual John Giffard Sports Award.

== Personal life ==
Giffard is married to Texan-born Crescent; he has at least one son, Charlie, who became an estate agent. Giffard's family resided with him in Yorkshire during his appointment there.

Giffard moved into Chillington Hall in 1999. The passing of the Hunting Act 2004, which banned fox hunting with dogs in England and Wales, posed a particular challenge to Giffard. The Albrighton Hunt, was permitted access to the grounds of Chillington Hall by Giffard's father. The hunt had close links with the Giffard family, having been founded by his adoptive father's ancestor Walter Giffard in 1830. Giffard and his father continued to permit the hunt to use the grounds until the act came into force, but Giffard notified the hunt that he would pursue trespass charges if it continued afterwards. In a Times article discussing the issue Giffard was described as "arguably Britain's most aristocratic policeman". There was also speculation, denied by Giffard, that he had been a potential candidate for chair of the pro-hunting Countryside Alliance.

Giffard later inherited the hall from his father, becoming part of the 29th generation of Giffards to own it. From 2008 he carried out a programme of restoration that included reroofing of the structure and redecoration of the rooms. His restoration of the hall's salon won the Historic Houses Association/Sotheby's Restoration Award in 2009.

In retirement Giffard installed a memorial fountain in the grounds of the hall to commemorate Staffordshire Police officers who have died in service. The memorial sits in a newly planted wood with views across Western Staffordshire, with visits by arrangement with the hall. In 2019 he hosted a dinner for 120 people at Chillington Hall that raised £13,000 for the police cadets.
