= St Paul's Church, Coven =

St Paul’s Church, Coven
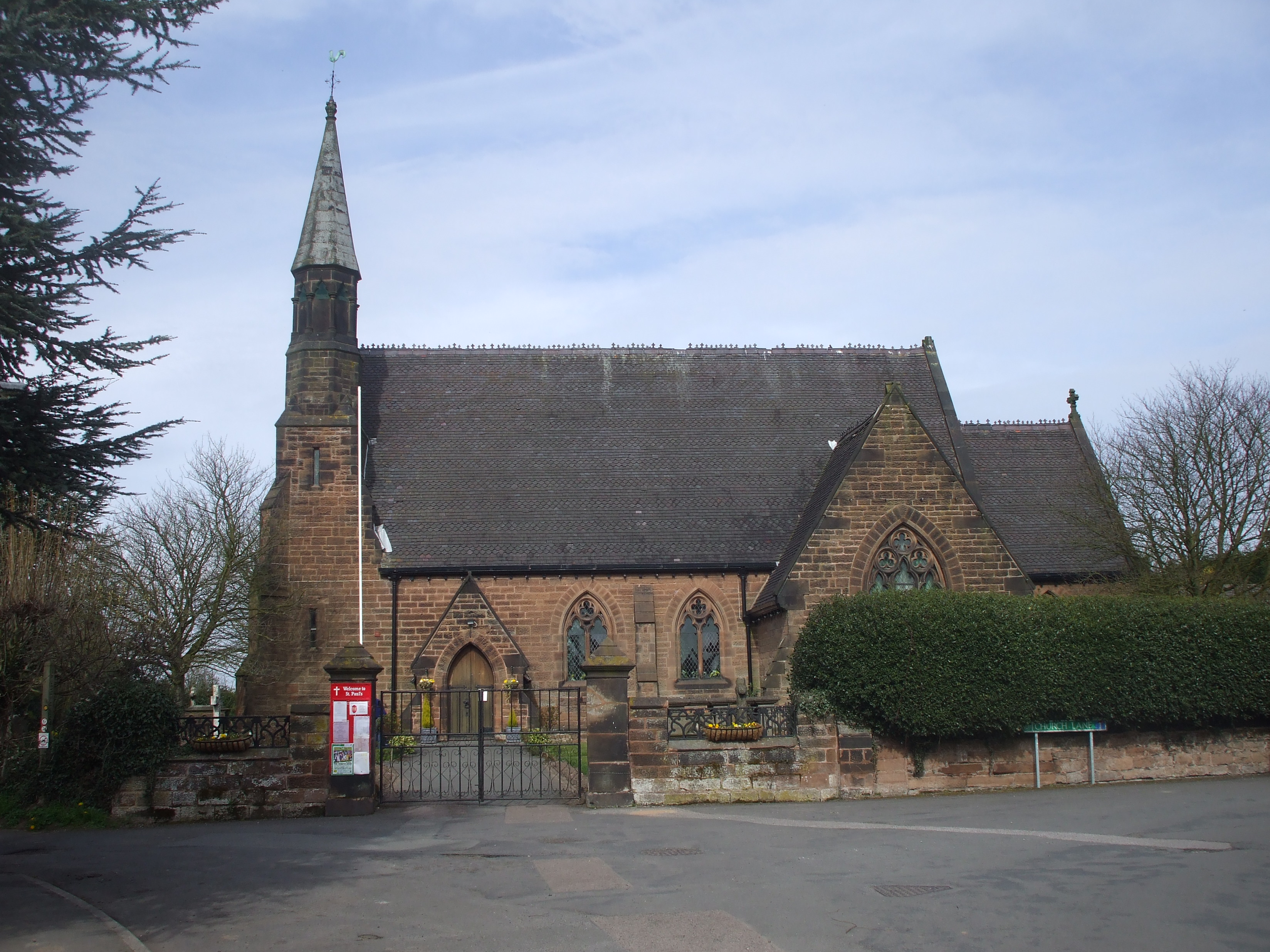
- St Paul’s Church, Coven
- St Paul’s Church, Coven
- 52°39′29.59″N 2°7′54.59″W
- OS grid reference: SJ 91175 06712
- Location: Coven, Staffordshire
- Country: England
- Denomination: Church of England

History
- Dedication: St. Paul
- Consecrated: 5 February 1857

Architecture
- Heritage designation: Grade II listed
- Architect: Edward Banks
- Completed: 1857

Specifications
- Length: 88 feet (27 m)

Administration
- Diocese: Diocese of Lichfield
- Archdeaconry: Lichfield
- Deanery: Penkridge
- Parish: Coven

St Paul's Church, Coven is a Grade II listed parish church in the Church of England in Coven, Staffordshire

== History ==
The church was built in 1857 by architect Edward Banks. It was built in the Early English style, and consists of a nave 62 feet (19 m) by 24.5 feet (7.5 m), two transepts 15 feet (4.6 m) by 15 feet (4.6 m), a chancel 16 feet (4.9 m) by 16.5 feet (5.0 m). It had a gallery with total seating capacity of 396. The contractor was built by Godfrey of Birmingham.

It was consecrated by the Bishop of Lichfield on 5 February 1857.

The churchyard contains two war graves of British Army soldiers of World War II.

== See also ==
- Listed buildings in Brewood and Coven
