= Albrighton (surname) =

Albrighton is a surname. Notable people with the surname include:

- Marc Albrighton (born 1989), English footballer
- Mark Albrighton (born 1976), English footballer
