= Albrighton Woodland Hunt =

- Founded: 1908
- Type of hunt: Foxhound
- Country size: 15 x 13 miles

The Albrighton Woodland Hunt is a United Kingdom foxhound pack, with hunting country of around 15 miles by 14 miles within Shropshire, Staffordshire, Worcestershire and the West Midlands.

== History ==
The Albrighton Woodland pack was created in 1908, splitting off from the main Albrighton Hunt, which previously hunted both countries, but then split with each having its own master of foxhounds and committee.

== Country ==
The hunt country lies on the borders of Shropshire, Staffordshire, Worcestershire and the West Midlands with meets including locations such as Stourbridge.

== Point-to-point ==
The Albrighton Woodland hosts its own point-to-point race at Chaddesley Corbett, which marks the end of racing season.

== See also ==
- Albrighton Hunt
- List of fox hunts in the United Kingdom
