= Coven, Staffordshire =

Village in England

Coordinates: 52.65°N 2.14°W

Coven
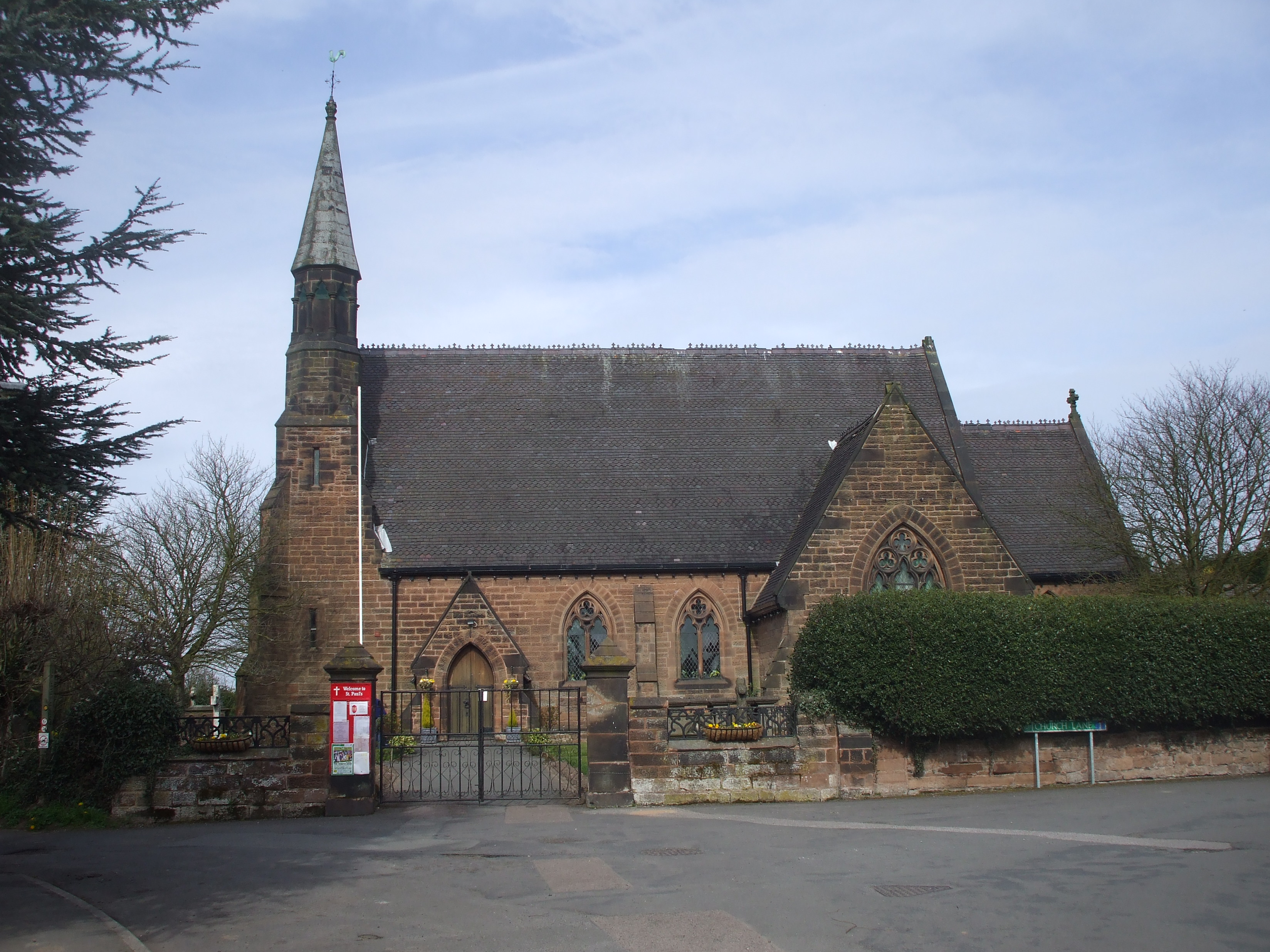
- St Paul's Church

- Location within Staffordshire
- OS grid reference: SJ900060
- Civil parish: Brewood and Coven
- District: South Staffordshire
- Shire county: Staffordshire
- Region: West Midlands
- Country: England
- Sovereign state: United Kingdom
- Post town: Wolverhampton
- Postcode district: WV9
- Dialling code: 01902
- Police: Staffordshire
- Fire: Staffordshire
- Ambulance: West Midlands
- UK Parliament: Stone, Great Wyrley and Penkridge

Coven is a village in the district of South Staffordshire, England, near the border with Wolverhampton. Together with Brewood it forms part of the parish of Brewood & Coven.

== Etymology ==
Coven derives from the Anglo-Saxon cofum, the dative plural of cofa, which means either 'a cove' or 'a hut'.

== History ==
The first record of Coven (as Cove) is in the Domesday Book of 1086; when it was listed as being held by William de Stafford. Prior to the Norman Conquest it was held by the Saxon ceorl Alric.

Iron-making was carried on at a furnace and two forges near to the village from the seventeenth century or earlier. 'The Homage' (circa 1679) is said to be the oldest brick-built house in Staffordshire. During the nineteenth century, John Smith operated a foundry in the village, where he produced stationary steam engines and locomotives.

St Paul's Church, Coven was opened in 1857.

== Transport ==
The village is located on the A449, and is also served by the Staffordshire and Worcestershire Canal. Select Bus 876 runs between Wolverhampton and Stafford (Mon-Sat) several times a day. Both Arriva Midlands and later National Express West Midlands operated hourly services between Wolverhampton and Stafford but these were withdrawn following funding cuts by Staffordshire County Council and the owners of the i54 business park respectively. The village was served by Four Ashes station until 1950s. The nearest stations are at Penkridge and Codsall.

== See also ==
- Listed buildings in Brewood and Coven
