= Chillington Hall =

Country house in Staffordshire, England

Coordinates: 52.6585°N 2.2029°W

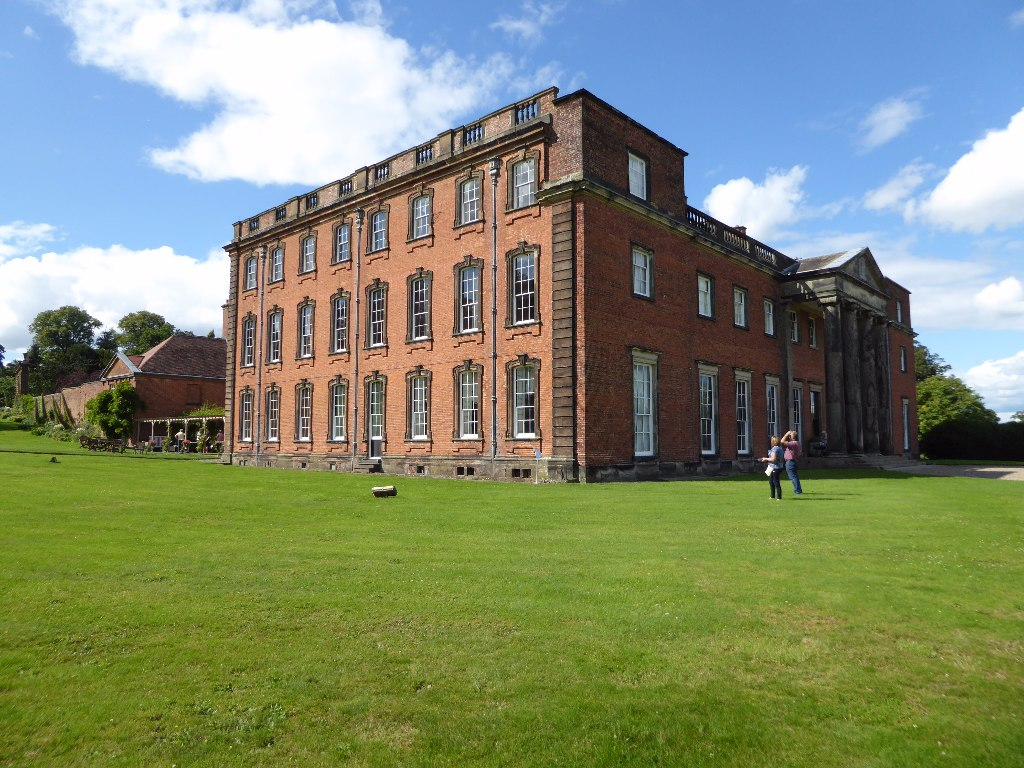
- front view
- Interactive map of the Chillington Hall area

General information
- Architectural style: Georgian
- Location: Brewood, Staffordshire, England
- Completed: 1724
- Client: Giffard family

Design and construction
- Architect: Francis Smith

Chillington Hall is a Georgian country house near Brewood, Staffordshire, England, four miles northwest of Wolverhampton. It is the residence of the Giffard family. The Grade I listed house was designed by Francis Smith in 1724 and John Soane in 1785. The park and lake were landscaped by Capability Brown.

== History ==
In the Domesday Book of 1086, Chillington (Cillintone) is entered under Warwickshire as forming part of the estates of William FitzCorbucion. His grandson Peter Corbesun of Studley granted Chillington to Peter Giffard, his wife's nephew, for a sum of 25 marks and a charger of metal.

The present house is the third on the site. In the 12th century there was a stone castle on the site, a small corner of which can be seen in the cellars of the present house, and beside it the original house. This house was replaced in the 16th century by Sir John Giffard, who was High Sheriff of Staffordshire on five occasions. Peter Giffard began the third building by demolishing and replacing part of Sir John's Tudor house in 1724. This rebuilding replaced the existing south front of three storeys in red facing bricks with stone dressing.

In about 1725, Peter Giffard planted the long avenue of oak trees which formed the original approach to the house, but he probably incorporated many existing trees. During the 1770s, Capability Brown designed the landscape park and lake to the south of the house for Thomas Giffard the elder.

There are a number of Grade II and Grade II* listed structures on the estate. The Grade II* listed dovecote and stable block were on the Buildings at Risk Register but were removed in 2009 following repair work. Restoration work had commenced in 2008 under John Giffard, former chief constable of Staffordshire Police.

=== Filming location ===
In 2023 the Hall was used as a filming location for the ITV1 and ITVx drama Joan. Filming began in February 2025 for Murder Before Evensong.

== See also ==
- List of Grade I listed buildings in Staffordshire
- Listed buildings in Brewood and Coven
