= Chester Priory =

Benedictine nunnery in Cheshire, England

Chester Priory was a priory of Benedictine nuns in Cheshire, England probably established in the 12th century. The priory was dissolved in 1540.
