= Albrighton Hunt =

British foxhound pack

- Founded: 1792
- Type of hunt: Foxhound
- Joint Masters: C Sankey, A Crane & M Salmon
- Huntsman: Mr M Salmon
- Kennelman: R Shaw
- Meet days: Tuesday and Saturday
- Country: Shropshire and Staffordshire
- Main Centres: Stafford, Newport
- Country size: 35 x 20 miles

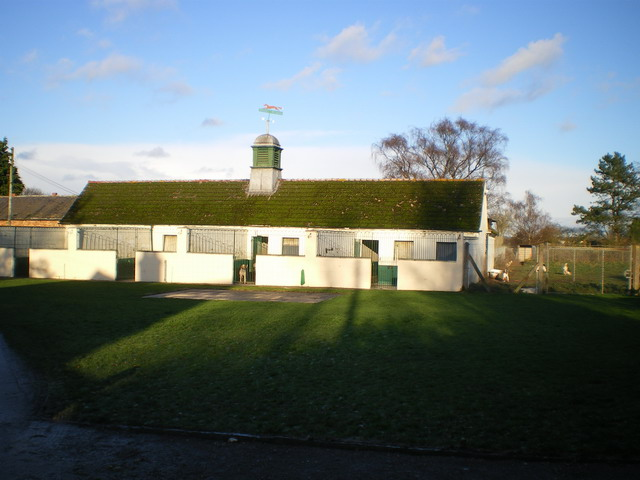
Kennels of the Albrighton Hunt

The Albrighton Hunt is a United Kingdom foxhound pack, with hunting country of around 30-35 miles by 20 miles (32 km) within Shropshire and Staffordshire.

== History ==
The Albrighton Hunt was preceded by two hunts in the North and South country, called the Shifnal and Enville respectively. There are records of the Enville hunt from 1792, while the Shifnal country was frequently hunted by Sir Richard Puleston from the neighbouring Wynnstay country. The hunt itself came into existence in 1825, with the country then covering from Newport down to Bewdley and Kidderminster.

The existing hunt came into formal existence in 1830, under the patronage of the Earl of Stamford.

In 2024, the Albrighton Hunt was issued a community protection warning following antisocial behaviour, including poor control of hounds resulting in the killing of a fox and deer.

== Country ==
The hunt country lies in Shropshire and Staffordshire, with key centres including Stafford and Newport.

At the time of the passing of the Hunting Act 2004, which heavily restricted hunting with hounds, the chief constable of Staffordshire Police was John Giffard, also squire of Chillington Hall and direct descendant of the first hunt master, Walter Giffard. Despite this direct link, the officer banned the hunt from his 4,000-acre (16 km^{2}) land for hunting.

== Point-to-point ==
The Albrighton hosts an annual point-to-point race, traditionally at Weston Park, although held at Bangor-on-Dee in 2009 due to damage at Weston Park from a music festival.

== See also ==
- Albrighton Woodland Hunt
- List of foxhound packs of the United Kingdom
