= Stottesdon Halt railway station =

Railway station in Stottesdon, England

Stottesdon Halt

General information
- Location: Stottesdon, Shropshire; England
- Coordinates: 52.438°N 2.507°W
- Grid reference: SO655827

Other information
- Status: Disused

History
- Original company: Cleobury Mortimer and Ditton Priors Light Railway
- Pre-grouping: Cleobury Mortimer and Ditton Priors Light Railway
- Post-grouping: Great Western Railway

Key dates
- 1908: Opened
- 1938: Closed
Location

Stottesdon Halt railway station was a station in Stottesdon, Shropshire, England. The station was opened in 1908 and closed in 1938.

Preceding station	Disused railways	Following station
Aston Botterell Siding; Line and station closed	Great Western Railway; Cleobury Mortimer and Ditton Priors Light Railway	Prescott; Line and station closed
