= George Plaxton =

Church of England clergyman and antiquary

George Plaxton Reverend
- Born: circa 1648; Wressle, East Yorkshire
- Died: October 1720; Trentham, Staffordshire
- Education: Pocklington School; St John's College, Cambridge
- Occupation: Parish Clergyman
- Years active: 1673—1720
- Known for: Antiquarianism, ethnography, estate management
- Spouse: Alice Perratt
- Children: William; Jane; George; John; Anastasia; Anna; Charles
- Parents: William Plaxton (father); Beatrice (née Akeroyd) (mother)

Ecclesiastical career
- Religion: Christianity
- Church: Church of England
- Ordained: deacon 1670; priest before 1673
- Writings: The Loyal Speech of G. Plaxtone, MA, upon the Proclamation of King James II (1685); Some Natural Observations Made in the Parishes of Kinardsey and Donington in Shropshire (1706)
- Offices held: Vicar of Sheriffhales, Staffordshire, 1673—1790; Rector of Kinnersley, Shropshire, 1673—1703; Rector of Donington, Shropshire, 1690—1703; Rector of Barwick in Elmet, West Yorshire 1703—1720

George Plaxton (circa 1648—1720) was a Church of England clergyman of Yorkshire minor gentry origins, who held benefices in the West Midlands and Yorkshire. As an antiquarian and early ethnographer he was noted for his close observation of rural life in Shropshire and interest in archeology, as well as for his friendship and correspondence with Ralph Thoresby and his circle. As an estate manager, he was important in helping to enable the rise to wealth and prominence of the Leveson-Gower family.

== Origins ==
Plaxton was a Yorkshireman, born at Wressle in the East Riding. His parents were Beatrice (née Akeroyd) and William Plaxton. In George Plaxton's Cambridge University record, his father is described as "gent. of Wressel". However, a William Plaxton, who was almost certainly George's father, has his own entry in Alumni Cantabrigiensis, the Cambridge University database, where he is described as Esq. of Pocklington, and still living in 1655. The places are not far apart and both titles suggest William was of the minor gentry. William matriculated at St John's College, Cambridge in 1622 but there is no record of his graduation. There is nothing to indicate William was a clergyman, either in his university record or in the Clergy of the Church of England database, which only mentions him in repeating George's Cambridge record. However both Cambridge University and the Church of England have a record for another William Plaxton, a generation older, a student at St John's 1597–1602, who was ordained both priest and deacon in 1607 and was Rector of Rossington in the West Riding 1614–1652. On chronological grounds, he could be George's grandfather or great uncle, although evidence is lacking. More plausibly, Henry Plaxton of Scrayingham, born c. 1636, who was educated at Pocklington School and St John's and held a series of benefices near York and along the Humber, looks like at least a close relative of George.

== Education ==
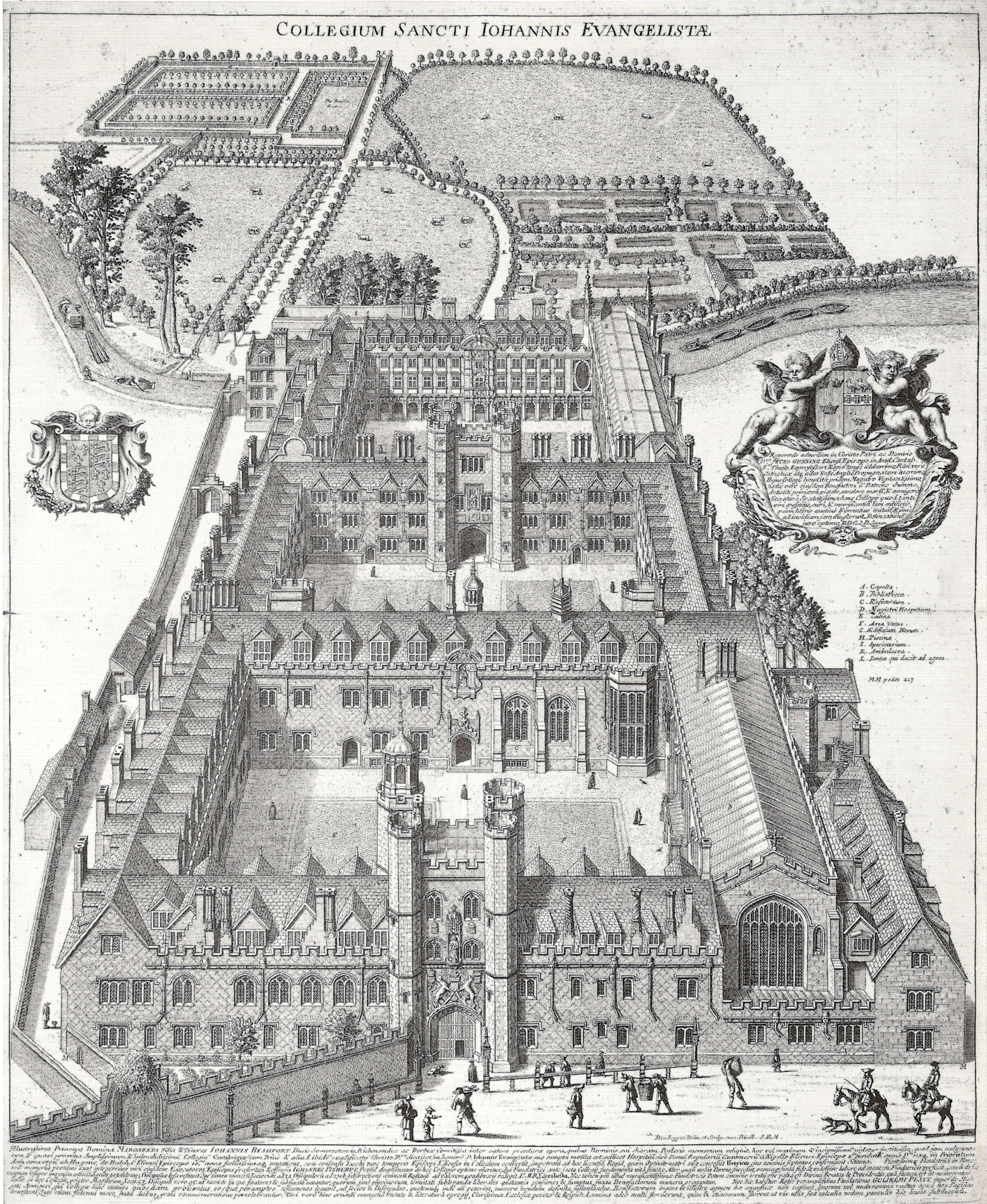
Collegium Sancti Johannis Evangelistae (College of St John the Evangelist) from Cantabrigia illustrata by David Loggan, 1690.

At least four Plaxtons registered at St John's College, some after Pocklington School and this could be more than just a family tradition. George Plaxton was certainly educated at Pocklington before admission to St John's, which had overall control of the school. Pocklington School had originated in a guild founded by John Dowman, in honour of St Mary and St Nicholas, under a licence issued in May 1514. In 1525 the founder granted lands to the college in order to secure scholarships there for five Pocklington boys. The college then rescued the school from oblivion and reconstituted it after the Dissolution of Colleges Act 1547. From 1552 the college held the school's original endowment, as patron of the corporation which was its governing body until 1875. This link between school and college probably explains why George and other Yorkshire Plaxtons went to St John's to complete their education. Plaxton's record in Alumni Cantabrigiensis gives the head's name at the time as Mr Elettson.

George Plaxton matriculated at St John's College, Cambridge, in 1666. The college was in a phase of its history described by the Victoria County History as "Anglican and Tory," which succinctly describes George Plaxton's religious and political orientation. Since the Stuart Restoration in 1660 the college had been under the mastership of Peter Gunning. He had been reinstated at the college as its master after having been expelled from it in 1643 for preaching against the Solemn League and Covenant, a formative and bitter experience at the hands of Puritans that now dictated its future course for several generations. Plaxton graduated BA in 1670 and on 29 May of that year was ordained deacon at York. His institution record at Sheriffhales. and Kynnersley show that he had received his MA by July 1673.

== Early clerical career ==
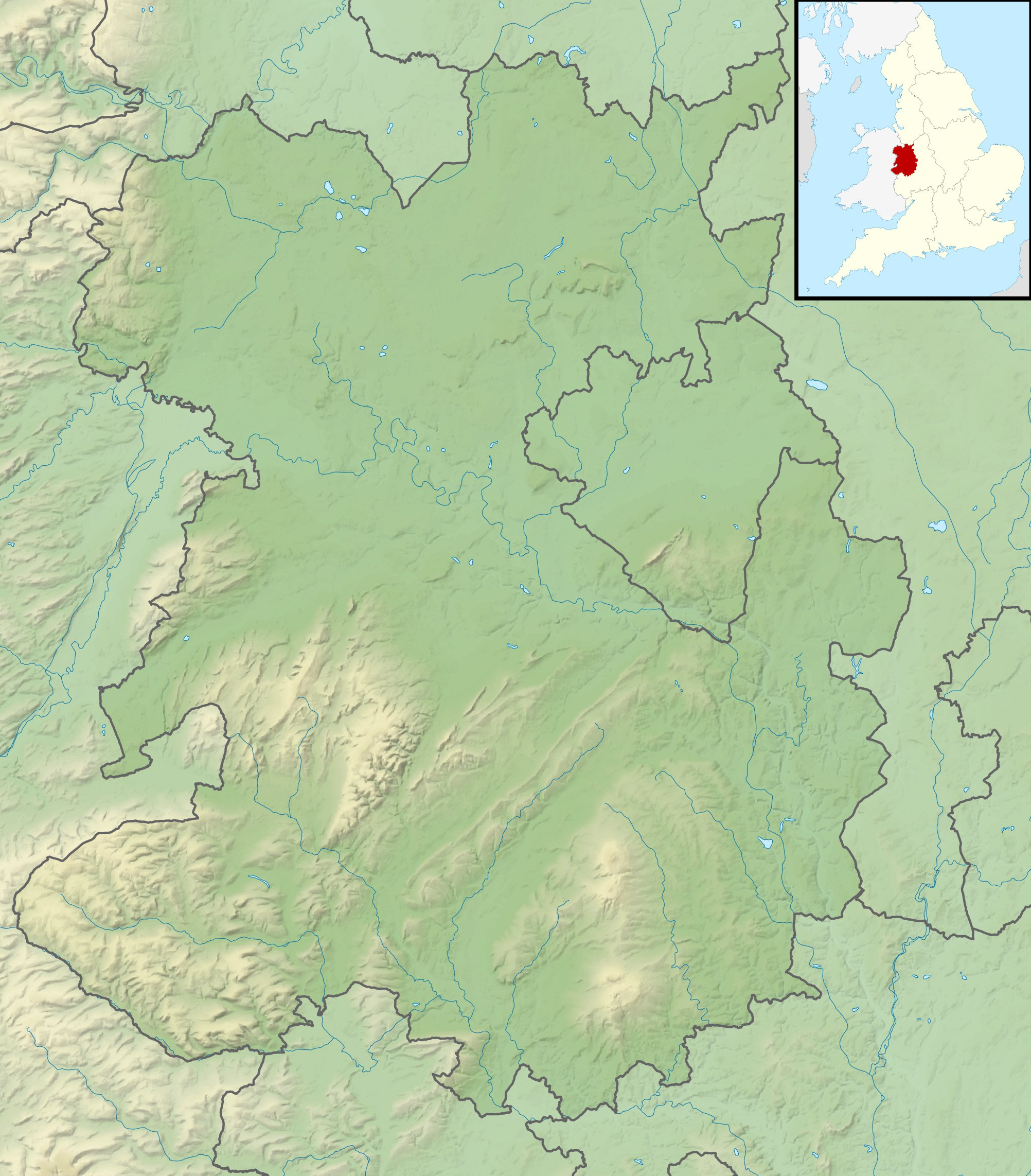
Relief map of modern Shropshire, showing locations of benefices held by George Plaxton in blue. The county border was altered in 1895: formerly Sheriffhales was in Staffordshire.

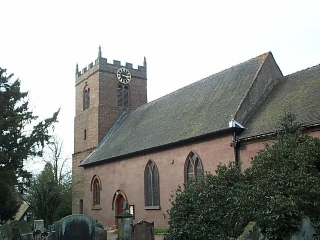
St Mary's Church, Sheriffhales. Tower collapsed c.1717 and replaced 1722—1723.

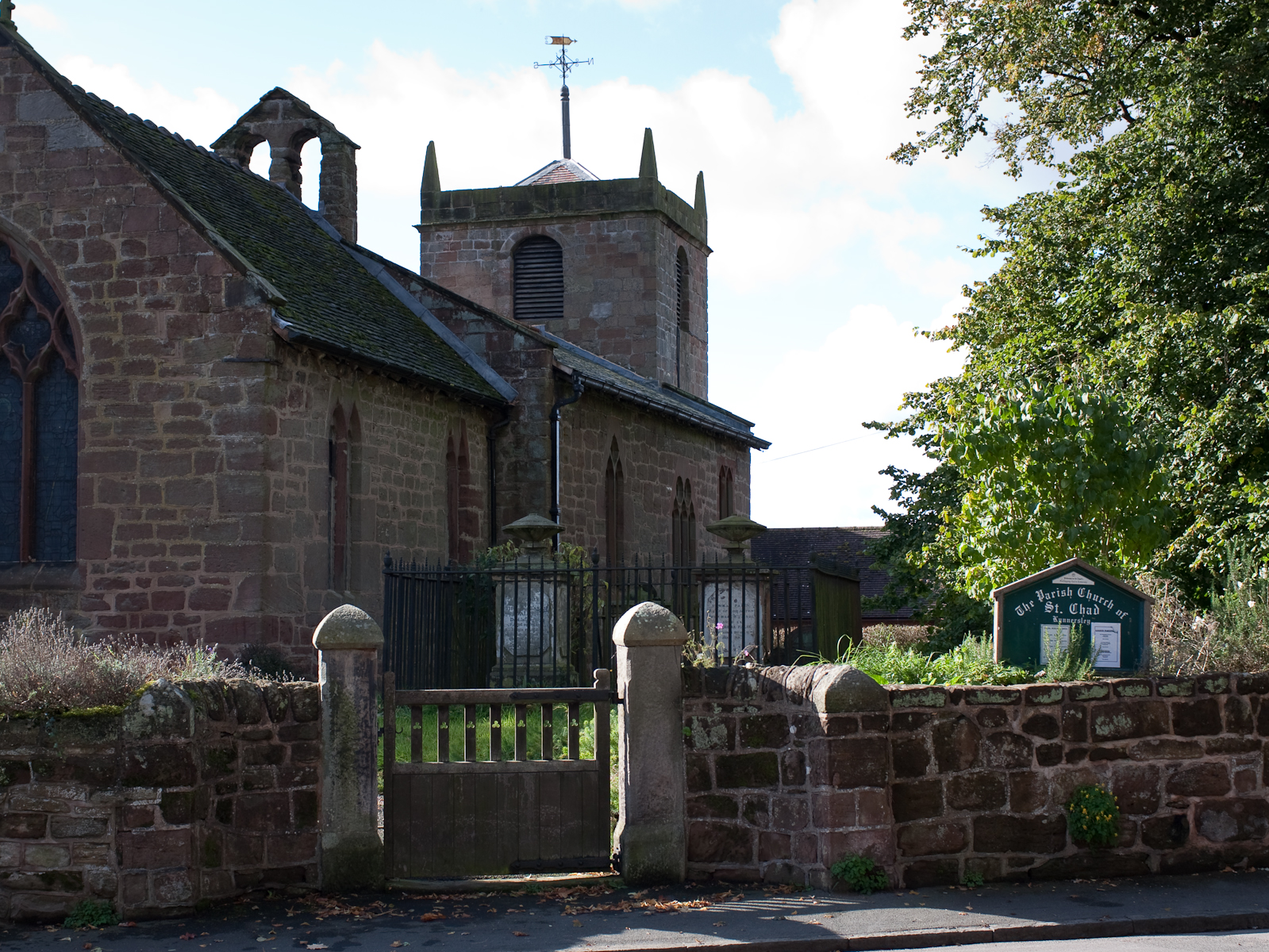
St Chad's Church, Kynnersley. Tower also rebuilt 1722—1723, shortly after Plaxton's death.

Plaxton joined the Leveson Gower household on 6 June 1670, only a week after his ordination as deacon. He was instituted vicar of St Mary's Church, Sheriffhales, on 8 July 1673 by Bishop Thomas Wood. He was presented by William Leveson Gower, but he was not inducted into the benefice until 12 November. Four days later he stood before his congregation to make the statutory declaration of assent and consent to the liturgy and doctrine of the Church of England. Between his institution and his induction at Sheriffhales, on 20 October, Plaxton had been instituted and admitted as Rector of Kynnersley, a few miles north-west of Sheriffhales on the Weald Moors. Here too his patron was William Leveson Gower. Plaxton was to retain the rectory of Kynnersley throughout and beyond his time as vicar of Sheriffhales.

Plaxton seems to have resided mainly at Sheriffhales for more than a decade, as that is where his marriage took place and most of his children were born. However, Arthur Michell, one of his successors as vicar, was uncomplimentary on his record keeping, referring to "G. Plaxton, who from 1679 to 1690 failed to make proper entries" in the parish registers. He did at least make a proper entry for his own marriage, to Alice Perratt at St Mary's Sheriffhales on 29 September 1677. The Perratt or Perrat family were from York and evidently made a close connection with the Plaxtons, as later a Thomas Perrott was to marry George and Alice's daughter Anastasia. William, son of George and Alice Plaxton, was baptised on 29 December 1678. However, another son named William was recorded as baptised on 6 December 1679 This is all the Sheriffhales parish register tells of the Plaxton family but this is the period when George Plaxton's carelessness left large gaps in the record. Later, after he left Sheriffhales for Donington Plaxton had some family details inserted into the register of St Cuthbert's Church there. There are listed William, born in 1678 but recorded as baptised on 26 December; Jane, who was born in December 1679 (casting doubt on the second William) but died young in 1685; young George, born in 1681; John, who was born on 12 March 1683 and baptised immediately because he seemed so weak; Anastasia, born on Easter Day in 1686; Anna, born in 1688. All of these were actually born at Sheriffhales, although there is no mention of them in the register there, except for William. Only Charles was born at Donington, on 3 February 1690, and baptised on 3 March. The register for Kynnersley might tell more of the story, but it seems not to have been published.

It seems that at some point in Plaxton's ministry at Sheriffhales a need was felt to improve access to the parish church. A list near the back of a register book shows that both Plaxton himself and his patron, William Leveson Gower, were among those who donated towards the cost of a causeway. Plaxton himself also gave the church two flagons made of pewter and a paten or communion plate for the "Communion Table," noticeably avoiding use of the term altar.

== Political interventions ==
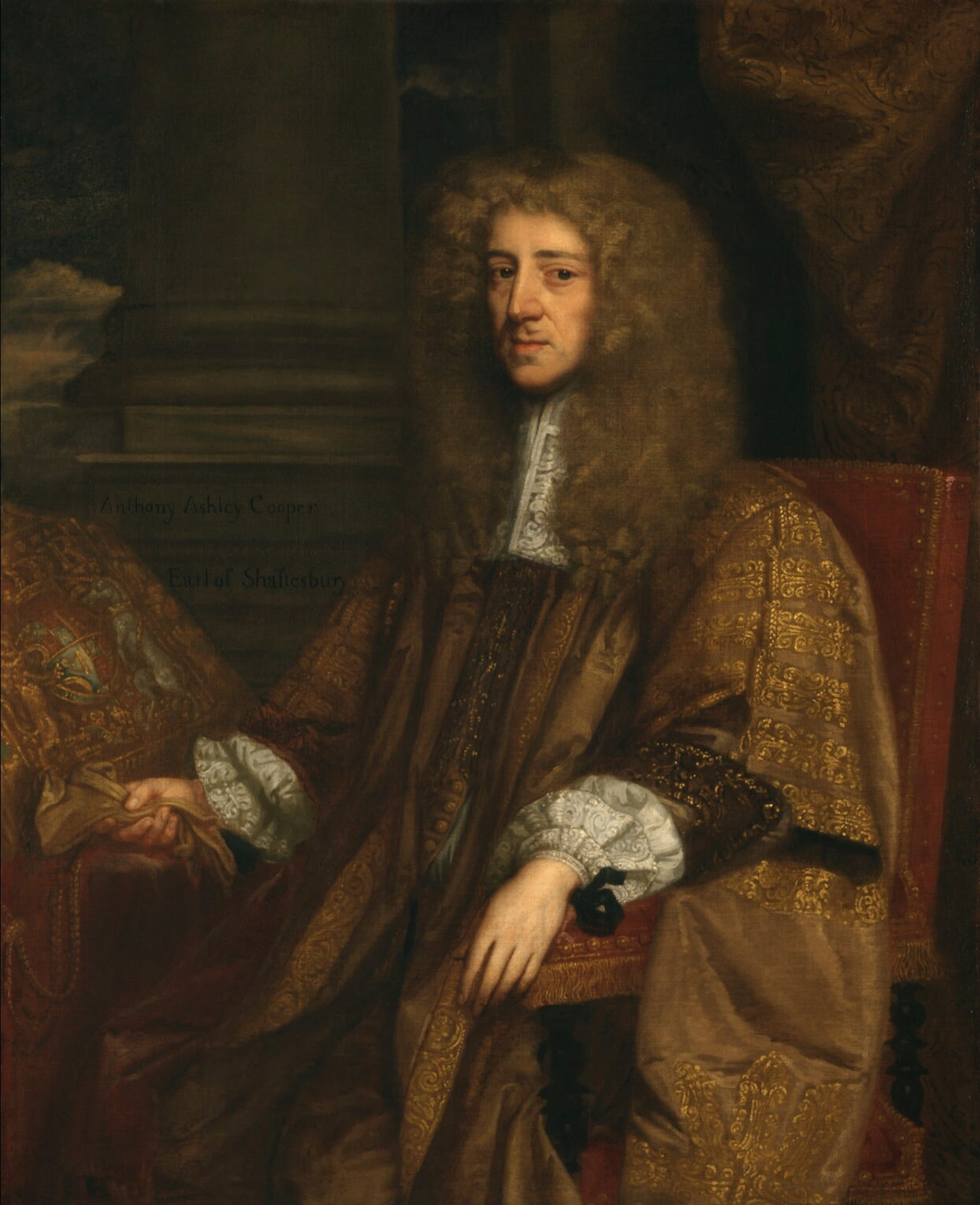
Portrait by John Greenhill of Anthony Ashley-Cooper, 1st Earl of Shaftesbury, leader of the Whig opposition.

James Scott, Duke of Monmouth and Buccleuch, circa 1683. Possibly after Willem Wissing. NPG 151. © National Portrait Gallery, London.

From at the latest his time at university, Plaxton was a Tory. This was true of William Leveson Gower, the patron of St Mary's, but only for some of the time. Leveson Gower was a Yorkshireman by birth, born at the Gower family seat, Stittenham, near Sheriff Hutton. His acquaintance with Plaxton probably began in his school days, as he too attended Pocklington School, and was of about the same age as Plaxton. J R Wordie, historian of the management of the Leveson Gower estates, describes Plaxton's relationship with the fourth baronet as "more that of a respectful friend than an employee," but also concedes that their professional relationship before 1689 was "obscure." He does, however, later recognise that William Leveson Gower was "reckoned to be a Whig throughout the 1680s." The History of Parliament entry for William Leveson Gower, published a year after Wordie's book, gives a fuller picture of his political commitments in this period, which covered such momentous events as the Exclusion issue and the Glorious Revolution. During Leveson Gower's swing to the Whigs, Plaxton made at least two important political interventions that revealed the gulf between them.

Although initially a supporter of Charles II and reviled for it by Anthony Ashley Cooper, 1st Earl of Shaftesbury, a key leader of the Whig opposition, the succession issue divided Leveson Gower from his Tory associates. The Whigs were in favour of legislation to ensure that the king's Catholic brother, James, Duke of York, could never succeed him. This had the support of most nonconformists, as well as self-consciously Protestant Anglicans, like Leveson Gower, who proclaimed that: "Nothing less than a firm union among all Protestants in this nation can be sufficient" Early in 1682 he was named as a supporter of dissenters and on 29 March 1682 Leoline Jenkins, Secretary of State, wrote to the Bishop of Lichfield's secretary offering up to £10 to recruit informers to keep Leveson Gower under surveillance, recommending the former MP for Stafford, Walter Chetwynd, whom Leveson Gower himself had nominated in the county seat in the previous general election. Communication was to be through the office of Owen Wynne, Jenkins' confidential secretary. A network of spies began to envelope Leveson Gower and his friends. As early as 4 April, a rumour mill had been set in motion: a spy's charge that he was stockpiling arms was supplemented by the entirely groundless accusation of Freemasonry.

Leveson Gower certainly courted notoriety. When the Duke of Monmouth, Charles II's illegitimate son and the Whig candidate for the succession, made a northward progress to Chester in early September 1682, Leveson Gower received and entertained him at Trentham On Monmouth's return southward on 19 September, Leveson Gower repeated his hospitality, accompanying him to Stafford. There the Duke received a rapturous reception but was then arrested on the king's orders. Leveson Gower was among those who offered to stand bail for him at that point and he renewed the offer after Monmouth was interviewed by Justice Raymond.

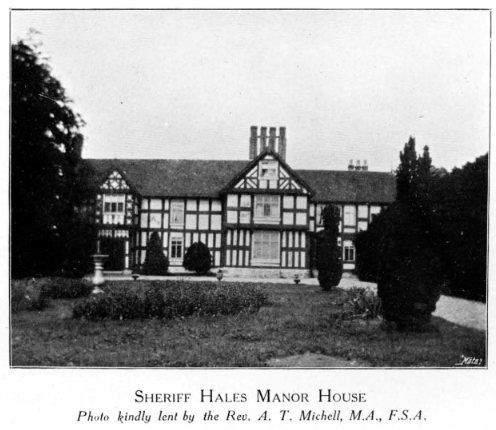
The manor house at Sheriffhales, c. 1900 - a dissenting academy under John Woodhouse, late 17th Century. The photo was lent by Arthur Tompson Michell to the Congregational Historical Society.

This political shift placed Leveson Gower and George Plaxton on opposite sides. The discovery of the Rye House Plot of 1683 created a critical situation. Leveson Gower had allowed a dissenting academy, intended to circumvent the ban on university education for nonconformists, to open in the Sheriffhales manor house, a very short distance west of St. Mary's. It's master, John Woodhouse came under intense pressure after the discovery of the plot and Plaxton wrote a damning character reference for him, which he sent in October to George Weld, a deputy lieutenant of Shropshire, although it soon landed, as was intended, on Secretary Jenkins' desk.

George Plaxton to George Weld. Reminding him of his promise to write to some of the powers above about Woodhouse. His school is of ill consequence, for while our youth are poisoned in their principles of sedition they will prove no good subjects to the King nor obedient sons to the Church. I beg your assistance. Woodhouse is gone to London to move for a prohibition or to appeal from the Chancellor's sentence. If you would write to Sir L. Jenkins, who is Dr. Rains' great friend, it might stop this bold man's career and do the doctor great service. If the Archbishop of Canterbury would call in his surreptitious licence, it would do well, for under colour of it he vends his counterfeit wares and traffics in faction.

The Loyal Speech of George Plaxtone MA: a pamphlet welcoming the accession of James VII and II in 1685.

Plaxton went on to welcome the accession of James II not merely from the pulpit but in print. He is generally assumed to be the author of The Loyal Speech of G. Plaxtone, MA, upon the Proclamation of King James II, which appeared under his name and mentions the circumstantial details that he was minister of Sheriffhales and gave the speech at Shifnal. He greeted the new king in rapturous terms, praising the entire Stuart line. The peroration ran:

Away then with those odious Names of Whigg and Tory; let 'em be forgotten and buried: Let us remember, that we are Christians, and English-Men; the former will teach us Loyalty and Allegiance to our King; Love, Unity, and Good Wishes towards one another: the latter will engage us to maintain the Glories and Peace of our Church and Nation; and to preserve the Best of Kings, and the Happiest of Governments. Let us all, with one Heart and Mind, Bless God for these Mercies; and say, God save King JAMES the Second.

After the flight of James II and accession of the joint monarchs William III and Mary II, Leveson Gower began to move back to the Tories, particularly as he was a strong supporter of Anne as potential successor. If there had ever been a breach between him and Plaxton, it had been repaired before his death in 1691.

== Later Ecclesiastical Career ==
St Cuthbert's Church, Donington, Shropshire. Tower replaced 1880 by near facsimile of that in Plaxton's time.

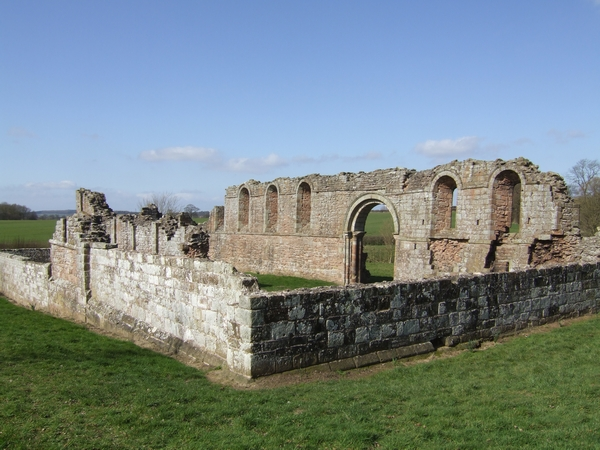
View of White Ladies Priory from the south-east.

A fanciful depiction All Saints Barwick, with maypole. Watercolour, W R Robinson, 1849. All Saints' Church is much further from the maypole than the painting suggests.

On 10 July 1690 Plaxton was instituted to the rectory of Donington. Once again the patron was Sir William Leveson Gower, now a Baronet. At this, he resigned his post at Sheriffhales but kept his rectory at Kynnersley for the time being. The Donington vacancy had been created by the death of the previous rector, John Fisher, in January. Coincidentally a new death register was commenced at about that point and Fisher's burial recorded for a second time. Plaxton and his church wardens, William Whiston and John Sutton, signed to inaugurate the book but Plaxton did not sign it again until the middle of 1698, whether through neglect or absence.

In 1694 the local magistrates permitted burials in the grounds of White Ladies Priory, which shortly after the Dissolution passed into the hands of the Catholic Giffard family, who sold it in the mid-17th century to the equally Catholic FitzHerberts of Norbury, Derbyshire. Catholic burials were to continue at White Ladies until 1844, when St Mary's Church, Brewood was consecrated. These Catholic burials were recorded separately from those at St Cuthbert's Church in Donington, but in the Donington register. Plaxton was the first to record them. The very first, that of Edward Revell, a gentleman of Shifnal, contravened the Burying in Woollen Acts by using linen instead of wool for the grave cloth. A fine of fifty shillings was imposed at the next quarter sessions and remitted to the overseers of the parish for distribution to the poor, with Plaxton and the churchwardens signing a receipt for it in the register. These White Ladies entries are is closely followed by a considerable amount of historical material on the parish inserted by Plaxton.

On 16 July 1703 Plaxton was presented to the Rectory of Barwick-in-Elmet in the West Riding, by John Leveson-Gower, 1st Baron Gower, Sir William's son, who was presumably acting in his capacity as Chancellor of the Duchy of Lancaster, a post he held 1702–1706, as the advowson of Barwick belonged to the Duchy of Lancaster. He was instituted on 9 September by Archbishop John Sharp and resigned both Shropshire benefices. He was inducted on 24 September and on 26 September he made the required declaration of unfeigned assent to the Book of Common Prayer and the Thirty-nine Articles. Wordie called Plaxton an "absentee rector" at Barwick but the reality seems more nuanced. Colman portrays Plaxton as a good parish priest, opening the church for weekday services and presiding at Holy Communion at least monthly. This was not what parishioners had come to expect, as recent rectors actually had been absentees and apparently negligent in their duties. By contrast, Plaxton was also seen as an earnest preacher. It seems that initially he managed to discharge both his priestly duties and his responsibilities as an estate manager, at least to the satisfaction of his congregation and clients.

As at Sheriffhales, in 1706 Plaxton donated to the church the basic items for Eucharistic celebration. The silver chalice is inscribed on the bowl, Sanguis Christi Fons est Vitae Aeternae: the blood of Christ is the source of eternal life. It bears the stamp of the maker, William Busfield of York. The paten, which is both a plate and a cover for the chalice, is inscribed Christus est Panis Vitae: Christ is the bread of life.

In 1708 Plaxton presided at the marriage of his daughter Anastasia to Thomas Perrot of York, a clergyman. However, only a year later, he had to conduct the funeral of his wife, Alice, who was buried on the north side of the altar.

Towards the end of his life George Plaxton was seen less often at Barwick and his place was taken by his son John, who from 1710 acted as his curate. He trusted John to deal with parish administrative and financial business as well as liturgical and pastoral responsibilities. In 1719, for example John was dealing with the sale or exchange of valuable Box pews.

== Estate manager ==
Plaxton's involvement in the administration the Leveson-Gower estates began as early as 1679, when the appearance of his handwriting in the accounts shows that he took over from the regular compiler, John Dovey of Beobridge. This continued until 1684 and in the same period he witnessed leases, audited accounts and advised in the selection of tenants. However, from 1689, around the time Sir William Leveson Gower swung back to the Tories, Plaxton began a much more vigorous involvement in management. By February 1690 he was bemoaning the conflict of interests that made it hard for him to act against tenants at Sheriffhales who were encroaching on Leveson Gower's heath.

I can the better act for you in the improvement of this manor when no way ties to them, as now I am. being their Vicar. But being once removed I can tell how to manage them, both as to the heath and other matters.

In May he proposed that he spend a month or two a year as Leveson Gower's assistant estate manager. Plaxton's move from Sheriffhales to Donington followed in the summer. Plaxton's move to Barwick in 1703 followed the same logic: his deepening and widening management responsibilities in Shropshire and Staffordshire were probably incompatible with holding West Midland benefices. The death of Sir William in December 1691 left Plaxton in full control of the estates during the minority of John, the successor. It was in this period that he designed and had built a large water feature at Trentham, which he described in a letter to Sir John:

a long canal of 468 yards in Length, a paddock course of 900 yards and upward a walk of 468 yards, 468 yards of Noble fence to a park all done for under £40.

More fundamental were Plaxton's changes to the management structure. Formerly the bailiffs in each area had themselves been fairly important tenants. Plaxton gradually replaced them with new men who rented little or no land from the estate but could be relied on to implement his plans: professional land agents not allied to the tenantry. This made them open to identifying opportunities for the landlord: in 1710 Ralph Wood, the Trentham agent, reported on the possibility of exploiting the coalfield in that area. However, Plaxton and his agents were hampered by a poor accounting system that he never managed to improve significantly.

It seems that Plaxton used his position to continue his campaign against nonconformists. He had written to Sir John in 1690 denouncing John Waterhouse, the head of the nonconformist academy at Sheriffhales, for damaging woodland and failing to maintain farm buildings. It seems that this feud was widened to all religious dissenters on the estates.

Plaxton most important change was in the overall structure of land tenancy. By the time he died very few leaseholders remained on the estate. As fixed-term leases came up for renewal, they were systematically changed to tenancies at will, which could be terminated by either party with a short term of notice. This allowed rents to be adjusted to circumstance - usually upward. It also made tenants much more pliable to the landlord in other ways. A large step towards treating land as a commodity, it tended to break the tenants' sentimental attachment to their farms, which leaseholders had tended to think of as their own. The tenant did have the benefit of low or no renewal costs. Moreover, the landlord could face vacant tenancies, with land lying idle, in times of agricultural depression. This happened in the last few years of Plaxton's life, but he was determined to stick to the policy, despite criticism from Lord Cheyne, in the hope of long-term gain.

After the early death of the first Baron Gower in 1709, his son, also called John, the future Earl Gower, had succeeded him. Cheyne was a trustee of the young John's marriage settlement, which involved a large part of the Leveson-Gower estates, so his opinion carried some weight. Sometimes he favoured Plaxton's views: he supported Plaxton's efforts to have the estates professionally and accurately surveyed. However, he continued to criticise Plaxton's regional agents and demand their dismissal. Plaxton was not swayed and at his death left his new system of management intact, albeit at the cost of writing off large amounts of historic debt as irrecoverable.

It seems that Plaxton was sometimes involved in the furniture and fittings of the estates, including the libraries, and it was this that led him into correspondence with Michael Johnson. He was a bookbinder and sometimes bookseller of Lichfield, which had been the local centre of both trades for about two centuries. Plaxton's correspondence with Johnson could be social, as when they discussed mutual acquaintances, or literary, as when it concerned interesting books Johnson might obtain. In 1716 Plaxton wrote a letter praising Johnson's role in the cultural life of the region, which is widely known, as James Boswell quoted from it in his biography of Michael Johnson's son, Samuel Johnson.

== Antiquary ==
Plaxton took a practical interest in conserving information and artifacts of historical importance. The rectory building at Barwick had been extended and reshaped by his predecessor, John Tancred, that it was described as "a stately house for himself and his successors." Among the builders' debris Plaxton found stones with an inscription relating to earlier work under the 15th century rector Richard Burnham: Magister Richardus Burnham hanc domum hic fieri voluit anno Domini 1440. Merci Jesu. In 1705 he had the stones carefully recovered and remounted in the structure. He took an equal interest in local archeological finds by others. In 1709 he made sketches of five bronze celts, found near Kiddal, just north of Barwick, and recorded their dimensions. These he sent to Ralph Thoresby, his friend and fellow-antiquary. Thoresby, in turn, reproduced the information in his Ducatus Leodiensis, an influential study of the Leeds region, recording the speculation about the objects, which were widely believed at the time to be Roman, rather than Bronze Age artifacts.

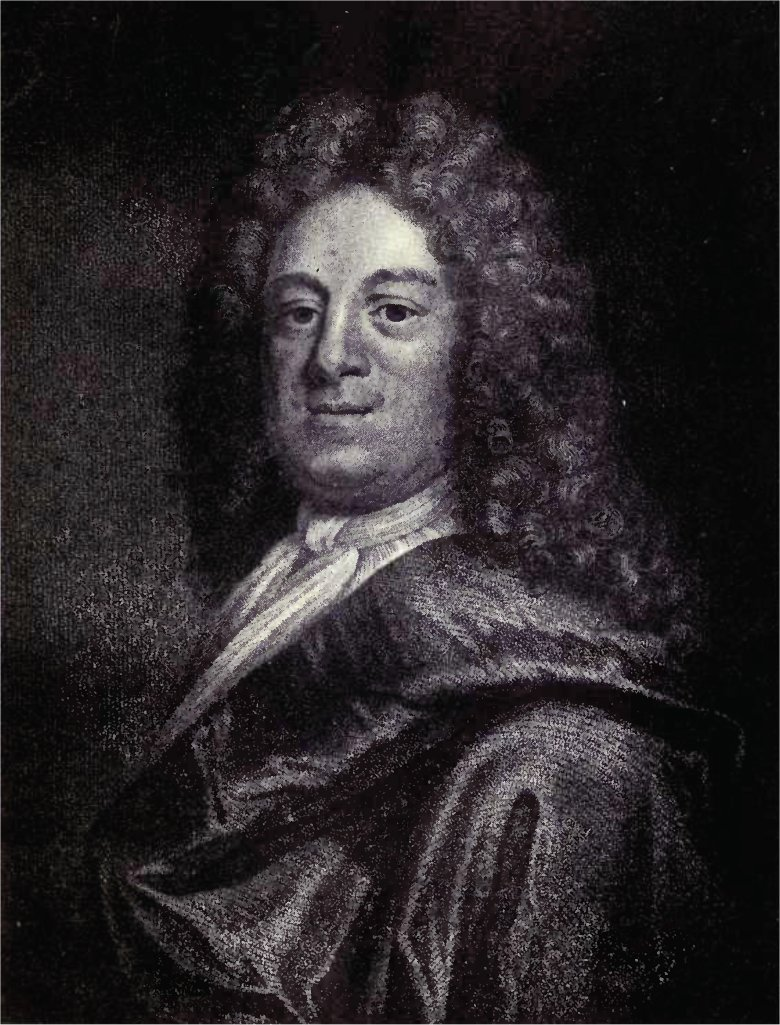
Ralph Thoresby

Thoresby was a nonconformist and had been prosecuted at Leeds in October 1683 during the intense repression following the Rye House Plot: the very time Plaxton was inveighing against the nonconformist intellectual John Woodhouse to the authorities. Plaxton seems to have met Thoresby very early in his time at Barwick: it was Thoresby who had observed and commented on the changes at the rectory in 1702. Their correspondence contains numerous antiquarian reports, as well as satire, witticisms and banter.

Arthur Michell described Plaxton as "a careful Antiquary," and counted among his contributions the body of notes and lists he left in the Donington register, containing information on the history of the parish. Many of his observations relate to his time in Shropshire and Staffordshire, although they were generally published later, perhaps based on notes he took at the time. Not all of them would normally fall under the description of antiquarian. In 1706 the Philosophical Transactions of the Royal Society contained a few pages of observations by Plaxton on the Weald Moors of Shropshire that veer across the fields of demography, ethnography, philology, geography, agronomy, history and much else. He started from the relatively large number of old people in Kynnersley, one in six being sixty or older, then commented on the isolation in the marshlands of its people, who knew neither religious dissenters nor lawsuits, and had no extremes of wealth and poverty. After speculating on local place names, Plaxton relates that the moors were formerly so well-wooded that the people had to use cattle bells to be able to track their herds. He describes the soil conditions:

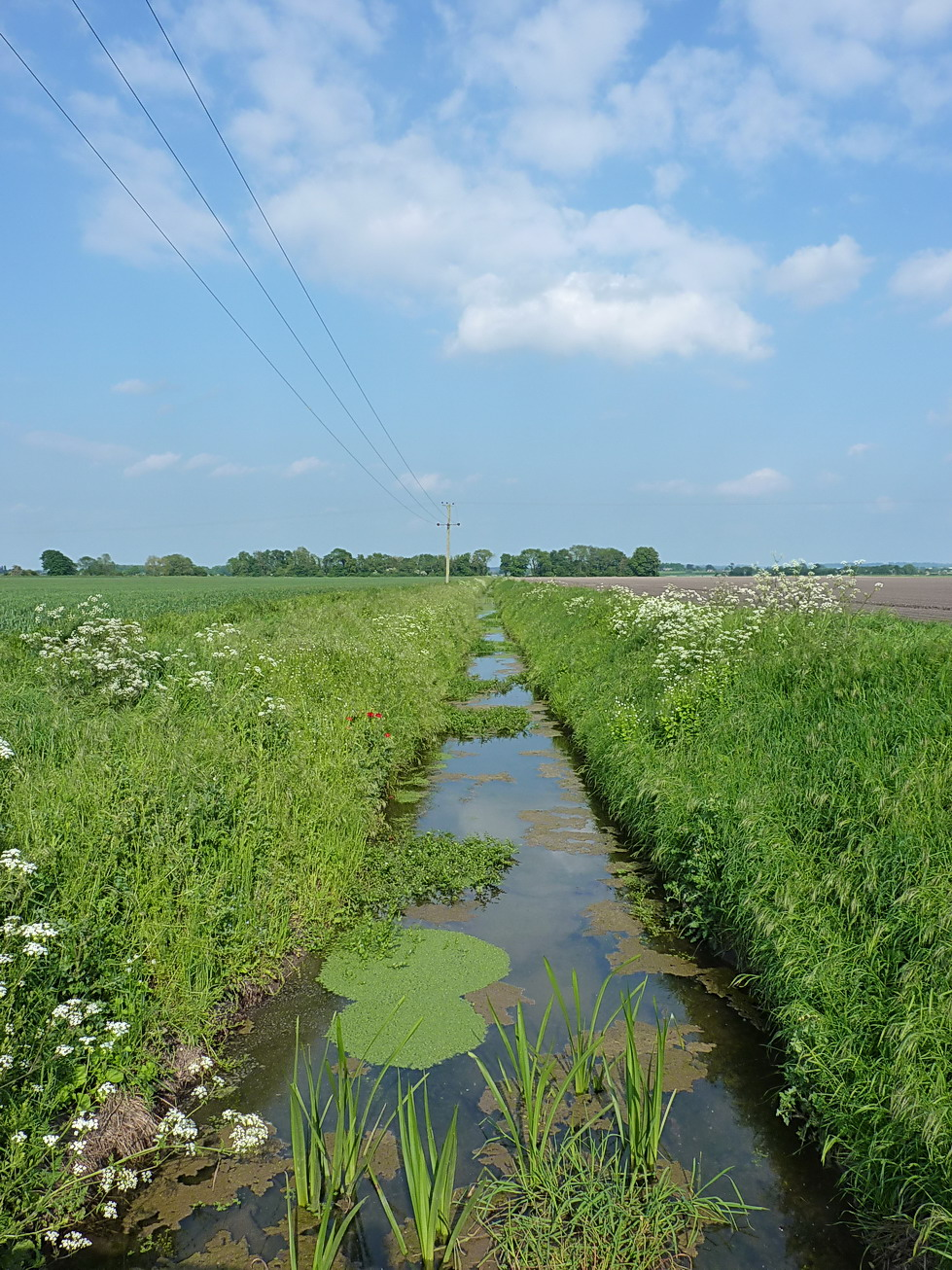
A drain on Eyton Moor.

this Sediment is full three or four Foot thick; for I have often observed, that the Black Soil cast up by Moles, or digged out of the Ditches, was a meer Composition of Roots, Leaves, Fibres, Spray of Wood, such as the Water had brought and left behind it; in Digging they often find Roots and Stumps of Oaks three or four Foot under the Surface, and they are very common in the bottom of their Ditches and Drains: The Soil is peaty, and cut up for Fewel in some part of the Lordship; in the bottom of these Peat Pits, they find Clay, Sand, and other forts of Earth. These Grounds have been formerly much higher, for I have observed Oaks and other Trees, where the present Soyl is so much shrunk and setled from them, that they stand upon high Stilts, and are supported from the great Fibres of the Roots, so that Sheep may easily creep under them.

Always interested in the economic potential of the land, he points out that draining had created good pasturage that has in turn generated good rents for the Leveson-Gowers. He gives details of The Wall, an ancient enclosure about a mile north of Kynnersley, which he judged to be "formerly a British Fortification": rightly, as it now recognised as an Iron Age hillfort. This is before discussing the demography of Donington, into which he weaves information about Boscobel and the Royal Oak.

Plaxton's observations in the Transactions had originated in his correspondence with his friend Ralph Thoresby, who had passed them on to Hans Sloane. Although his time in Shropshire was now well behind him, Plaxton continued to report on details of local life, as when he explained a Shropshire wedding custom.

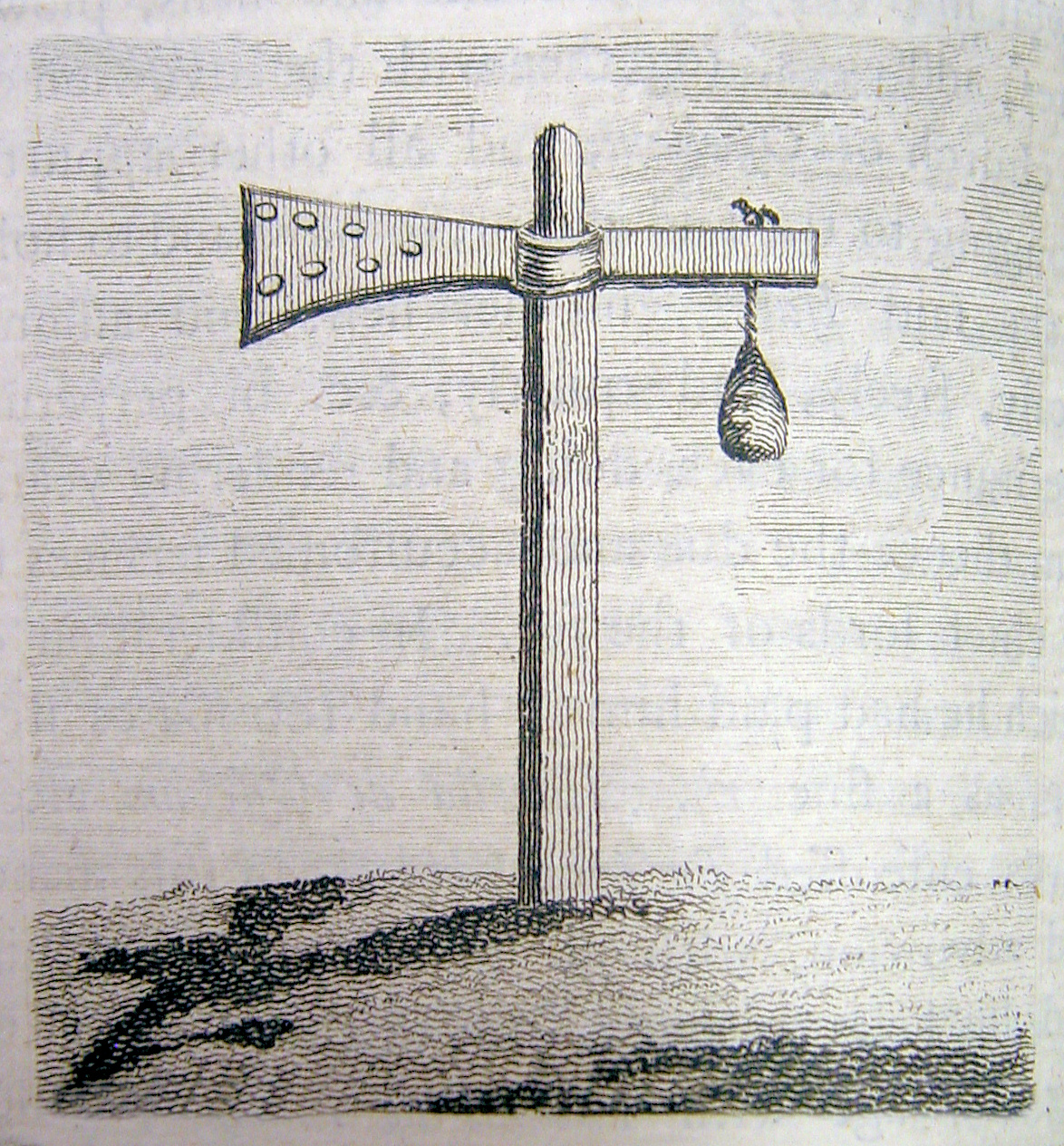
Quintain on the Green in Offham, Kent. An illustration from Hasted E. The History and Topographical Survey of the County of Kent, Vol 4 p. 224. 1798

The Quintain, or Quintan, is a ludicrous military exercise, used yet in the midland counties of England; you may call it a military sport or pastime. We have a quintan set up almost at every wedding in Shropshire. The custom is thus: in the open road, through which the bridegroom brings his bride to his own or to the wedding house, there is usually a post fixed in the ground, sometimes bedecked with flowers and branches. The young men of the villages adjoining, who have set up this quintan, stand ready with bundles of long sticks, in imitation of spears; these they offer to the bridegroom's attendants, who being on horseback, take each man his stick, or spear, and run full speed at the quintan, each striving to break his spear against it, and he is thought the bravest fellow who breaks the most sticks. They ride full gallop, and tilt upon the course: oftentimes they are unhorsed, and become the sport of the by-standers. They follow one another in their charge, and each man takes his turn. They have a notable slight in running at the post, and knapping their spears asunder. At the last, comes the bridegroom, to whom a fine white spear is offered, adorned with flowers. He rides a full career, and manfully breaks it; though commonly in favour of him the spear is a little cut, that it may break the easier. Many miss the quintain; sometimes the shivers of the stick hurt them. Sometimes they are overthrown, and fall from their saddles. Generally there is good sport and pastime, and much laughing amongst the rabble at some accident or other which befals these tilting knights. When the spears are all broke, they give the young men who set up the quintain something to drink, and ride away to dinner.

Sometimes Plaxton's antiquarian interests and estate management duties combined, in an attempt to understand the Leveson-Gower holdings through their history. The Sutherland Collection contains a manuscript history of Lilleshall by Plaxton, in which he traces the evolution of the holdings from the dissolution of Lilleshall Abbey and the purchase of its lands by the Wolverhampton merchant James Leveson. Similarly, legal problems surrounding the curacy of Barlaston church led Paxton into historical research which he relayed to Sir John Leveson-Gower.

== Death ==
On 20 November 1720, the antiquarian and diarist Thomas Hearne noted:

About half a Year since, died of a good old age the Reverend Mr. George Plaxton, a Cambridge Man. He was a very ingenious Man and a good Scholar. He loved Antiquities. He lived of late Years much at my Ld Gower's.

This led to confusions in some sources about the date of Plaxton's death, as Hearne overestimated the time that had elapsed. Michell even gave 1721 as his year of death, while Colman thought "The exact date of his death and the place of his burial are not known." In fact, the register of Trentham, where he died, records his burial as 7 October 1720, so he almost certainly died three or four days earlier.
