= Cleobury North Crossing railway station =

Former railway station in Shropshire, England

Cleobury North Crossing

General information
- Location: Cleobury North, Shropshire; England
- Coordinates: 52.481°N 2.554°W
- Grid reference: SO624872

Other information
- Status: Disused

History
- Original company: Cleobury Mortimer and Ditton Priors Light Railway
- Pre-grouping: Cleobury Mortimer and Ditton Priors Light Railway
- Post-grouping: Great Western Railway

Key dates
- 1908: Opened
- 1938: Closed
Location

Cleobury North Crossing railway station was a station in Cleobury North, Shropshire, England. The station was opened in 1908 and closed in 1938.

Preceding station	Disused railways	Following station
Ditton Priors Halt; Line and station closed	Great Western Railway; Cleobury Mortimer and Ditton Priors Light Railway	Burwarton Halt; Line and station closed
