= Ditton Priors Halt railway station =

Former railway station in England

Ditton Priors
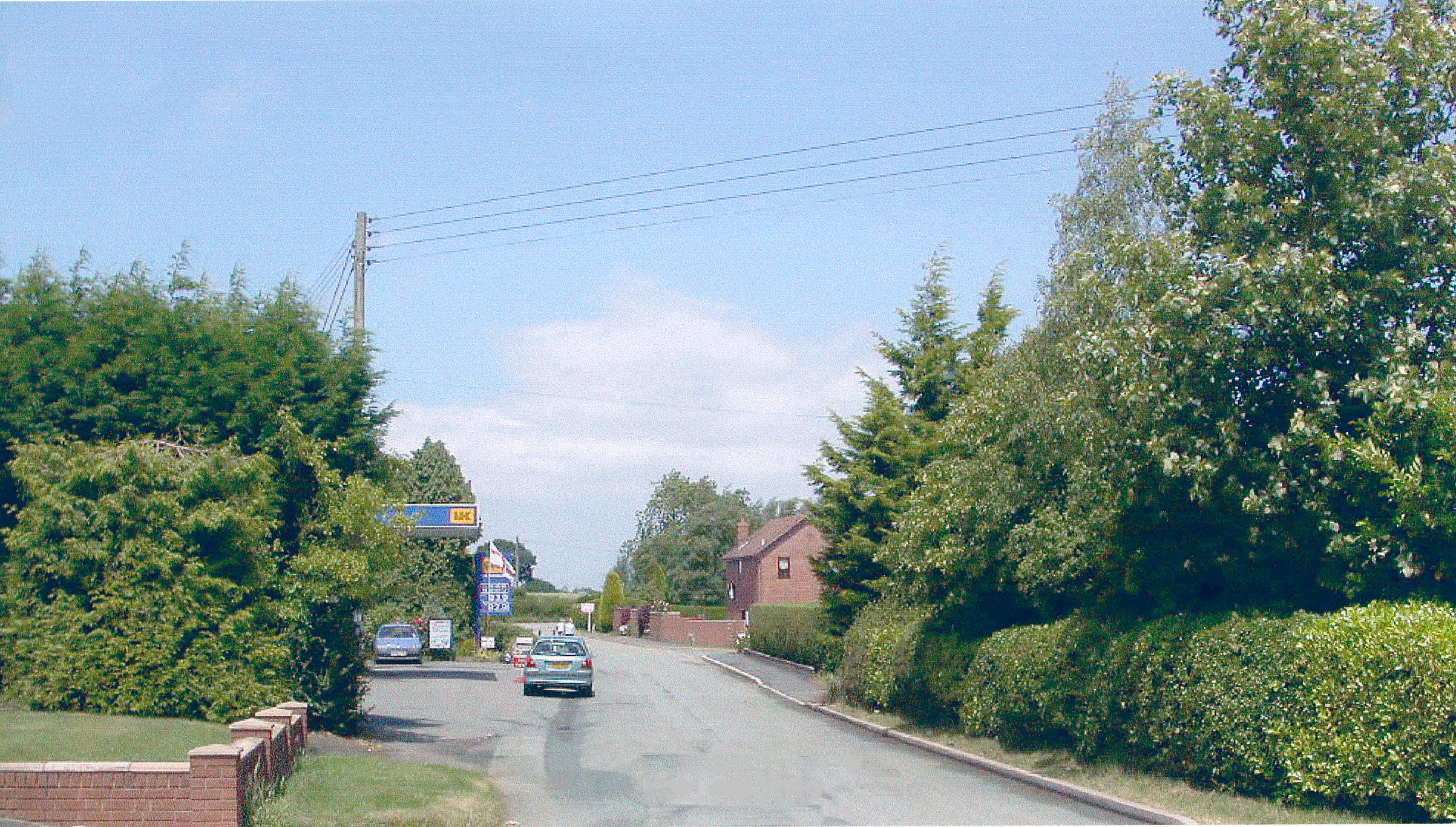
- The site of the station in 2004

General information
- Location: Ditton Priors, Shropshire; England
- Coordinates: 52.49932°N 2.57298°W
- Grid reference: SO612893

Other information
- Status: Disused

History
- Original company: Cleobury Mortimer and Ditton Priors Light Railway
- Pre-grouping: Cleobury Mortimer and Ditton Priors Light Railway
- Post-grouping: Great Western Railway

Key dates
- 21 November 1908: Opened
- 26 September 1938: Closed to passengers
- 11 September 1939: Closed to goods
Location

Ditton Priors railway station was a station in Ditton Priors, Shropshire, England. The station was opened in 1908 and closed in 1938.

Preceding station	Disused railways	Following station
RNAD Ditton Priors; Line and station closed	Great Western Railway; Cleobury Mortimer and Ditton Priors Light Railway	Cleobury North Crossing; Line and station closed
