= Aston Botterell Siding railway station =

Disused railway station in England

Aston Botterell Siding

General information
- Location: Aston Botterell, Shropshire; England
- Coordinates: 52.458°N 2.534°W
- Grid reference: SO637846

Other information
- Status: Disused

History
- Original company: Cleobury Mortimer and Ditton Priors Light Railway
- Pre-grouping: Cleobury Mortimer and Ditton Priors Light Railway
- Post-grouping: Great Western Railway

Key dates
- 1908: Opened
- 1938: Closed
Location

Aston Botterell Siding railway station was a station in Aston Botterell, Shropshire, England. The station was opened in 1908 and closed in 1938.

Preceding station	Disused railways	Following station
Burwarton Halt; Line and station closed	Great Western Railway; Cleobury Mortimer and Ditton Priors Light Railway	Stottesdon Halt; Line and station closed
