= Burwarton Halt railway station =

Disused railway station in England

Burwarton Halt
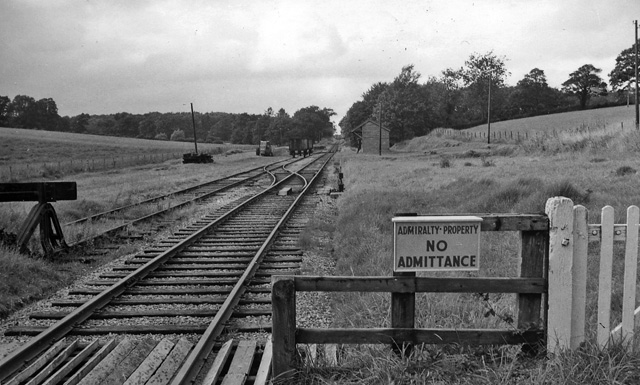
- The site of the station in 1963

General information
- Location: Burwarton, Shropshire; England
- Coordinates: 52.468°N 2.542°W
- Grid reference: SO632857

Other information
- Status: Disused

History
- Original company: Cleobury Mortimer and Ditton Priors Light Railway
- Pre-grouping: Cleobury Mortimer and Ditton Priors Light Railway
- Post-grouping: Great Western Railway

Key dates
- 1908: Opened
- 1938: Closed
Location

Burwarton Halt railway station was a station in Burwarton, Shropshire, England. The station was opened in 1908 and closed in 1938.

Preceding station	Disused railways	Following station
Cleobury North Crossing; Line and station closed	Great Western Railway; Cleobury Mortimer and Ditton Priors Light Railway	Aston Botterell Siding; Line and station closed
