= White Ladies Priory =

Former priory in Shropshire, England

Brewood Priory (White Ladies)
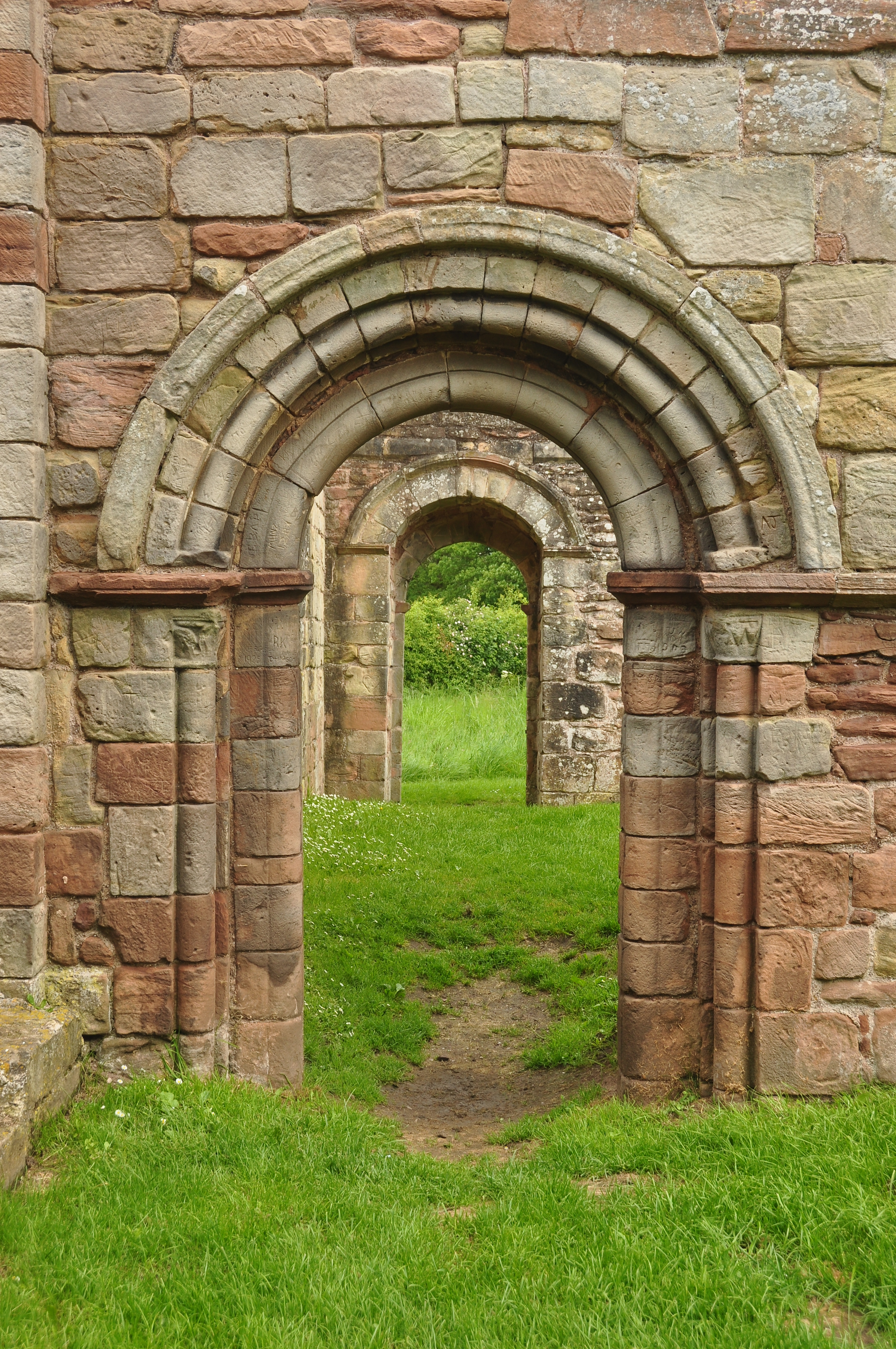
- Romanesque arch at White Ladies Priory

- Location within Shropshire

Monastery information
- Full name: St Leonard's Priory, Brewood
- Other name: Convent of White Nuns
- Order: Augustinian
- Established: Mid-12th century
- Disestablished: 1537/8
- Dedication: Leonard of Noblac
- Diocese: Diocese of Coventry and Lichfield
- Controlled churches: Montford, Shropshire; Tibshelf; Bold

People
- Founder: Unknown
- Important associated figures: Bishop Roger Northburgh carried out canonical visitations.; Alice de Harley, prominent 14th-century prioress.; Sir Thomas Giffard, seneschal before dissolution.; Margaret Sandford, last prioress.; William Whorwood purchased site after dissolution.

Site
- Location: Near Brewood
- Coordinates: 52.6657°N 2.2584°W
- Visible remains: Substantial remains of priory church.
- Public access: Yes
- Other information: Accessible all year at all reasonable times. A short walk from a minor road.

White Ladies Priory (often Whiteladies Priory), once the Priory of St Leonard at Brewood, was an English priory of Augustinian canonesses, now in ruins, in Shropshire, in the parish of Boscobel, some eight miles (13 km) northwest of Wolverhampton, near Junction 3 of the M54 motorway. Dissolved in 1536, it became famous for its role in the escape of Charles II of England after the Battle of Worcester in 1651. The name 'White Ladies' refers to the canonesses who lived there and who wore white religious habits.

== Origins ==
The origins and exact date of foundation of the priory are not known: the latter part of the 12th century is generally accepted as the period of establishment. The surviving ruins show work typical of the late 12th century, and the first documentary evidence dates from 1186 or earlier. In it, Emma, daughter of Reynold of Pulverbatch, in the process of giving land to Haughmond Abbey near Shrewsbury, mentions that she has already granted a virgate of land in Beobridge to the white nuns of Brewood. The publication of this information by the important Shropshire historian Robert William Eyton in 1856 directly contradicted his own conviction, published only a year earlier, of a date in the reigns of Richard I of England or John, as well as casting into doubt older traditions linking the priory with Archbishop Hubert Walter. Eyton thought the priory a Cistercian house, which is now known to be incorrect, but his documentary research still gives the earliest known date by which it must have been founded.

Emma's grant placed the priory in Brewood, which is in the neighbouring part of Staffordshire, not Shropshire: it was simply the nearest village of any size and the priory has never lain within the boundaries of Brewood parish. The priory was in an extra-parochial area, and its location gives no clues to the identity of its founder. The priory acquired the church and some tithes at Montford very early in its history. So it is possible that the Lacy family or the FitzAlans, who succeeded them as holders of the manor of Montford with Forton, may have been important in its founding. William FitzAlan, Lord of Oswestry was a powerful marcher lord, closely associated with the cause of Empress Matilda during the Anarchy, who was a prominent and generous supporter of Shropshire's Augustinian houses. He was closely associated with the founding of Haughmond Abbey, while Wombridge Priory was founded by his vassals with his support. He was also a benefactor of Lilleshall Abbey. The advowson of Lilleshall Abbey belonged the Zouche family, who were also associated with White Ladies. However, there is no documentary evidence connecting any known figure to the founding of White Ladies: only clues in the historical context. No lay person claimed the right to nominate or approve the appointment of a prioress, or to exploit the estates during vacancies: only the Bishop of Coventry and Lichfield ever intervened.

== Dedication and order ==
The dedication was to Leonard of Noblac, a French saint associated with the liberation of prisoners, who was extremely popular after a number of alleged miracles earlier in the 12th century. The dedication is attested fairly early in the history of the priory: for example, a 1212 charter of King John says it is a confirmation monialibus Sancti Leonardi de Brewud – to the nuns of St Leonard at Brewood.

It is now accepted that the priory belonged to the Augustinian order. John Leland was commissioned in 1533 by Henry VIII to investigate the libraries of religious houses in England. As part of his duties, he visited White Ladies shortly after its dissolution in 1536. He originated the false idea that White Ladies was a Cistercian house. Certainly Cistercians wore a white habit, while the color of the Augustinian habit could vary, the primary element being the wearing of a white, linen rochet, similar to that of the canons. However, the register of Richard Swinefield, a 14th-century Bishop of Hereford, clearly refers to transferring rights to prioressse et conventui albarum monialium sancti Leonardi de Brewod, Coventrensis et Lichefeldensis diocesis, ordinis sancti Augustini: "the prioress and convent of St Leonard of Brewood, (in the diocese of Coventry and Lichfield,) of the Order of St Augustine." Leland's mistake led William Dugdale and some subsequent authors to include it among the houses of that order. The white habit made it easy to distinguish between the canonesses of St Leonard's Priory and the black-clad nuns of the Benedictine house that lay a short distance to the east in Brewood parish, Staffordshire, which was known in contradistinction as Black Ladies Priory.

== Estates and finances ==
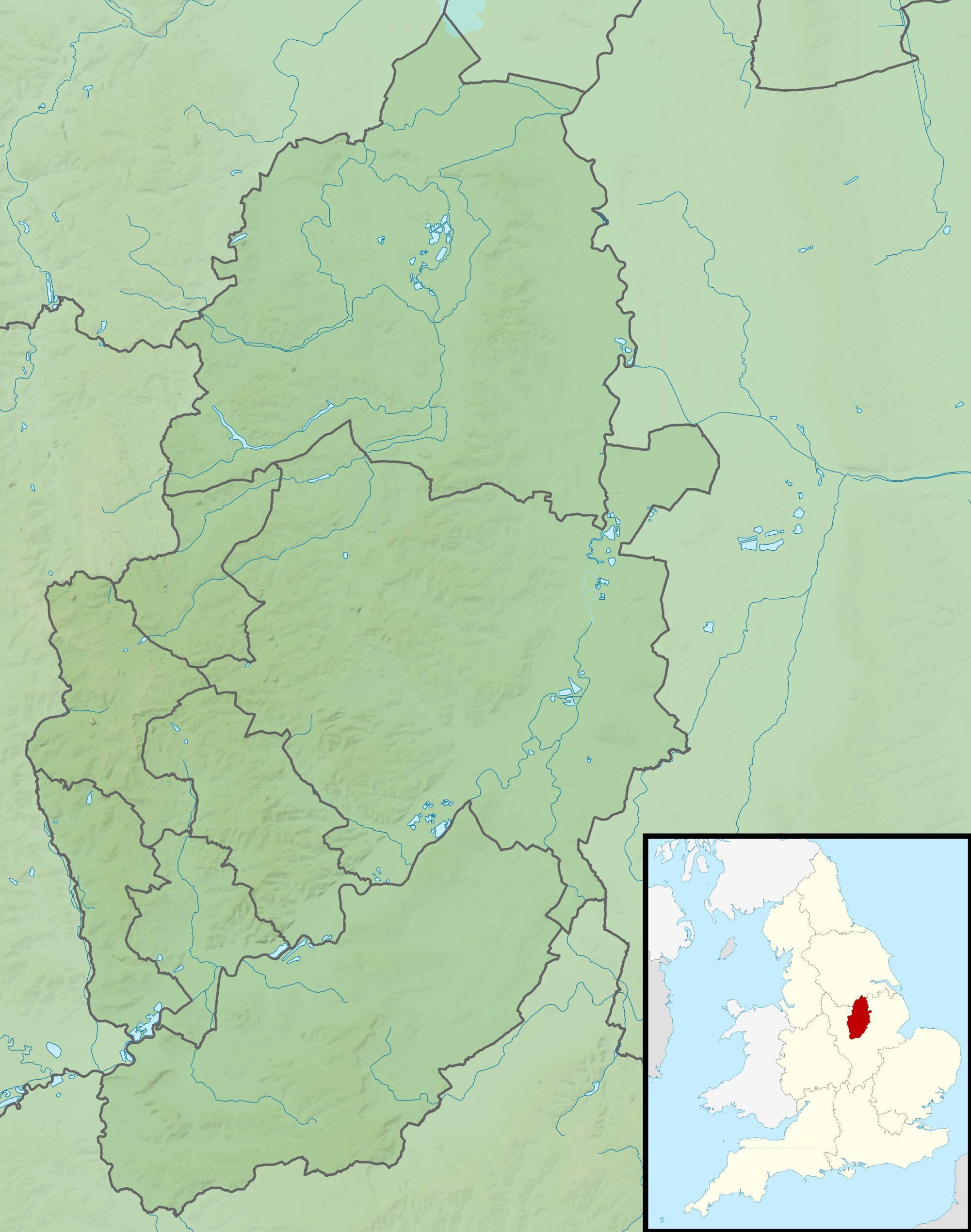
Relief map of Nottinghamshire, showing locations of estates held by White Ladies in that county and Derbyshire

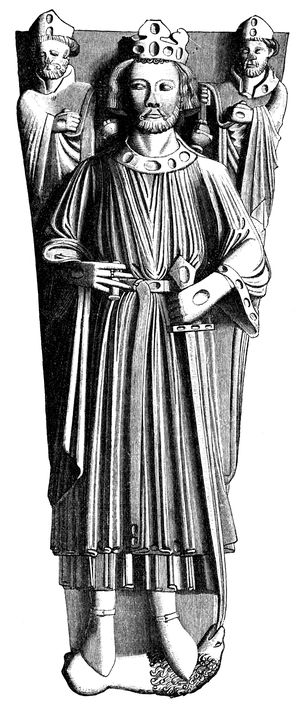
Effigy of King John, from his tomb in Worcester Cathedral

White Ladies benefited considerably from royal generosity in the reign of John. He visited Brewood on at least three occasions and it was possibly on one of these that he gave the priory a weir called Withlakeswere on the River Severn near Bridgnorth, which would create fishing rights. This was later rented out to a local man, Henry FitzRobert, half by Prioress Alditha in 1225 at 5 shillings, and the other half subsequently by Prioress Cecilia, also at 5 shillings. White Ladies must have held 12 bovates of land at Calverton in Nottinghamshire from early in its history but in 1212 a charter of King John removed all secular demands and obligations stemming from it. Issued during the Interdict, this demonstration of the king's piety was witnessed by a group of notables, headed by a favourite, William d'Aubigny, 3rd Earl of Arundel. This foothold in Sherwood Forest was enlarged, at least in value, by John's son, Henry III. On 8 December 1232, while visiting Shrewsbury, he granted the priory the right to assart, enclose and cultivate an acre and a half in the woods near Calverton. In 1241 he allowed the priory to assart and cultivate as they wished a further three acres of land which they already held but were half covered in dead oaks. These areas were enhanced in value by being taken out of waste and exempted from the control of royal forest officials.

Another relatively distant possession of White Ladies was the church at Tibshelf in Derbyshire, the advowson of which must have been granted early in the history of the priory. In 1291 the Taxatio Ecclesiastica of Pope Nicholas IV assessed the rectory as worth £8 but also recorded £1 going to the nuns of Brewood. Early in the following century the priory moved to appropriate the church: essentially taking over the tithes and employing a vicar to serve the church and its congregation. In order to obtain a licence from Edward II to appropriate the church into mortmain, the prioress and convent had to part with a fine of £10, a very large sum for the priory at any stage in its history. The licence was duly granted on 1 November 1315. Evidently the details of the transaction took some time to work out, as it was not until 7 July 1319 that Bishop Walter Langton was able to issue an ordinance defining the vicar's allotment of land and directing that he be paid 40 shillings annually, divided into equal payments at Easter and Michaelmas. This was reinforced by a papal ordinance, which erroneously attributed to the priory a dedication to St Lawrence. Evidently Tibshelf proved a good long-term investment: before the dissolution, the Valor Ecclesiasticus reported Tibshelf bringing in £5 6s. 8d. However, to continue holding the rectory, the priory was required to pay a pension of 20 shillings a year to the vicars of Lichfield cathedral, a condition not mentioned in Langton's ordinance but in force by 1402 at the latest, as in that year the Archdeacon of Stafford's court passed an ordinance on its payment.

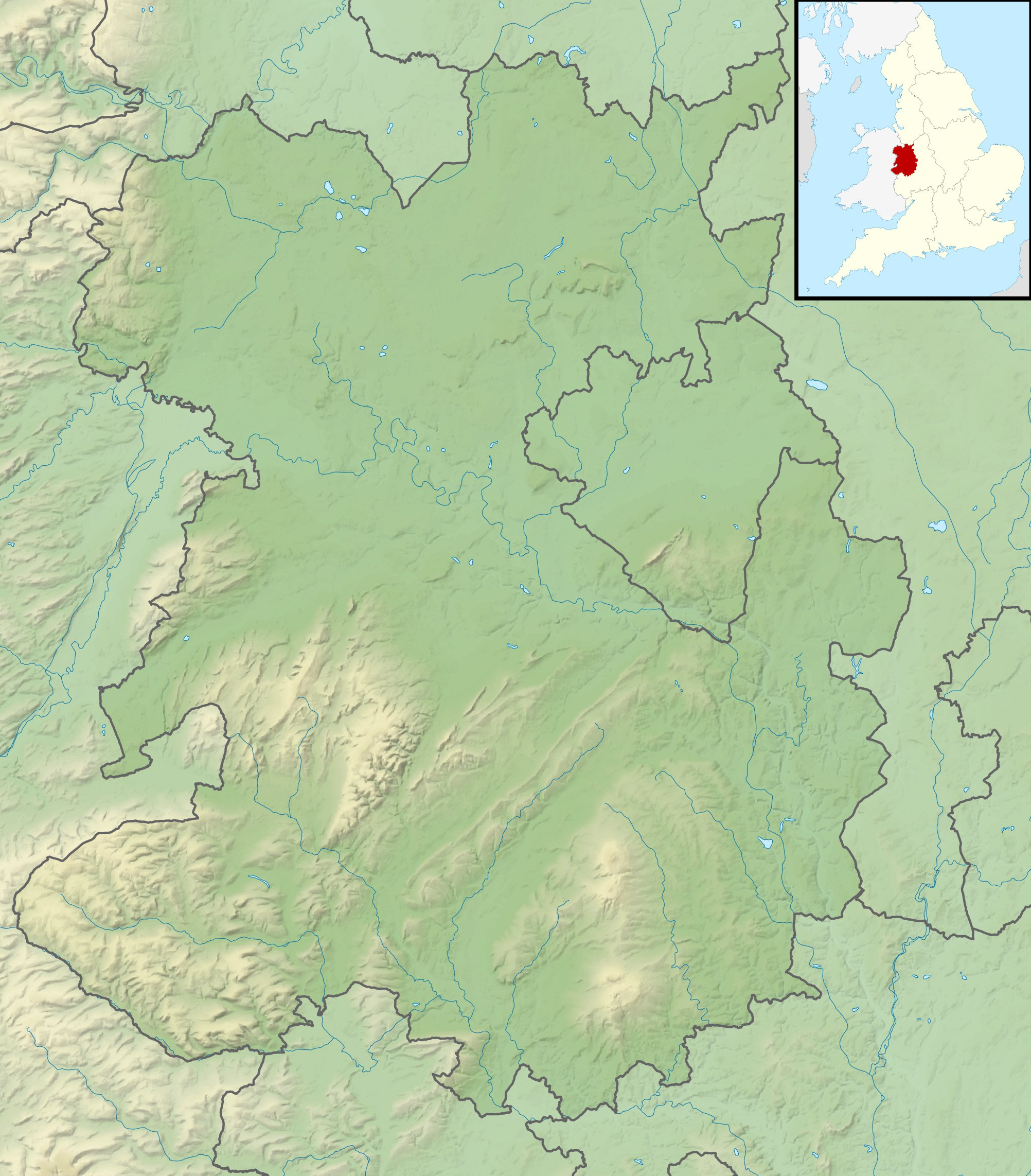
Relief map of Shropshire to show locations of estates held by White Ladies in that county and Staffordshire

Beside its holdings in the East Midlands, the priory held many very small pieces of property, mostly donated by local families, around Brewood and scattered across Shropshire to its south and west. On 6 October 1254, for example, Philip de Beckbury, in response to a fine levied at Westminster, agreed to pay the priory one mark annually as rent for two mills at Beckbury. In 1256 William de Ercall, and Prioress Agnes engaged in a complicated series of lawsuits, including a fine of lands, to transfer to the convent a very small rent (a ninth of the sheaves on three carucates of land) and small piece of land for a weir. This involved settling any competing claim that might come from Wombridge Priory. Some small transfers represented the dowries of canonesses on their admission to the community. Bartholomew Terret gave a virgate in Lawley as dowry for his sister Gundred. Richard de Harley and his wife Burga went to considerable trouble and expense to donate property and rights to the priory, the most important being the advowson of Bold church, which was in southern Shropshire and part of the Diocese of Hereford. On 11 May 1309 Bishop Swinefield asked the dean and chapter of Hereford Cathedral to approve the transfer of the advowson from Harley to White Ladies. He issued an ordinance to this effect on 3 August. As it involved an alienation in mortmain, the transfer required royal approval, and this could only be secured through payment of a fine. Edward II's licence was issued on 6 August, permitting the transfer of a messuage and half a virgate of land at Bold, in addition to the advowson. This was probably to provide a dowry for Alice de Harley, who later became prioress. In the longer term, the value of Bold declined greatly, probably as a result of declining population, and the income proved insufficient to maintain a priest, prompting Bishop Thomas Mylling to issue an ordinance on 10 October 1481, amalgamating the church with that of neighbouring Aston Botterell. Although a pension of ten shillings, payable each Michaelmas, was promised to White Ladies, Bold was bringing in only 6s. 8d. in 1536.

The Belmeis family, closely involved in the foundation of Lilleshall Abbey during the 12th century, turned their generosity to White Ladies in the 13th and 14th. It seems that the priory already had substantial holdings in the Belmeis manor of Donington by the mid 13th century, as Joanna, widow of Walter de Belmeis was forced to seek a settlement of her dower in 1256 by suing the prioress for a third part of 100 acres. John de Belmeis petitioned Edward I for permission to grant the priory ten acres of land and ten of wood in Donington and the king ordered an inquest on 1 May 1304. The inquest found that the land was part of a much larger estate John held of Alan la Zouche and that it was worth 3s. 4d. per year. After payment of a fine, a licence for the alienation in mortmain was issued on 18 May from Stirling, where the king was besieging the castle. In July 1315 his son Hugh also secured an inquest into a proposed grant of 30 acres of wood. The inquest found the land to be worth 5 shillings per year. On 1 November, the day he licensed the appropriation of Tibshelf church, Edward II also permitted, for a fine of £5, the grant of 30 acres to the priory by Hugh de Beumeys.

The priory, like other monastic houses, was not immune from the changes in the economic climate and generally sought to adjust. For example, the expanding population and rising market of the 13th century meant that pasture land was brought under increasingly close management, which posed dangers for small landholders and tenants, like White Ladies. The priory must have acquired a small estate at Rudge, near Pattingham but within Shropshire, some time before 1292 as in that year Prioress Sarra (Sarah) sued William de Rugg, the lord of the manor for denying her use of common pasture. Unlike some of the other cases brought to court, this was not a fictitious issue intended to create a record. The jury found that William had contravened his tenants' historic rights and deprived them of pasture they required for their animals through enclosures designed to improve his estate. He counter-sued the prioress and others for breaking down his fence. However, Sarah and the other tenants won their cases. It seems that White Ladies was dogged in defending common pasture. In 1305 the prioress of the time, possibly still Sarah, arraigned an assize of novel disseisin to assert her rights against William Wycher, who seems to have been particularly aggressive in enclosing commons after taking control through marriage of the manor of Blymhill, which neighboured the priory demesne. The situation changed greatly after the agrarian crisis of 1315–22 and even more so after the onset of the Black Death in Shropshire during Spring 1349. The overall result was to encourage leasing of demesnes, a trend that affected monastic estates as much as those of lay landholders. This persisted for more than a century and, when prices began to rise in the 16th century, White Ladies, like other religious houses, found itself with most of its land on long-term leases at low fixed rents, leaving it barely able to meet outgoings. When the priory property was sold in 1540, some of these long leases were revealed: a lease of 1471 in the reign of Edward IV, was for 99 years, so would not expire until well into the reign of Elizabeth I. Unable to adjust its rents upwards to allow for inflation, the priory had little left to pay for repairs and the condition of the buildings suffered.

By the Dissolution, White Ladies had lands, property or rights at Brewood, Bridgnorth, Beckbury, Berrington, Chatwall (in Cardington), Donington, High Ercall, Clee St. Margaret, Humphreston (in Donington), Ingardine (in Stottesdon), Highley, Rudge, Haughton (probably in Shifnal), Sutton Maddock, Tong, Shrewsbury, Montford and other villages in the West Midlands. There were also properties in Calverton and Tibshelf. The demesne and other lands around Brewood brought in £10 9s. 6d. Mountford was very valuable, bringing in £8, and it was followed by Tibshelf, worth £5 6s. 8d., and Calverton, £2. A small property at Highley was the only other property worth more than a pound: £1 10s. 8d.

== Building ==
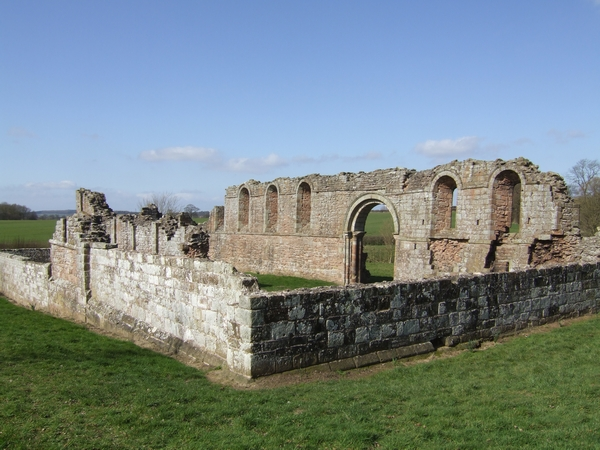
The view from the south-east. The large arch marks the entrance to the north transept. To the left of it can be seen the nave north wall and windows; to the right the chancel.

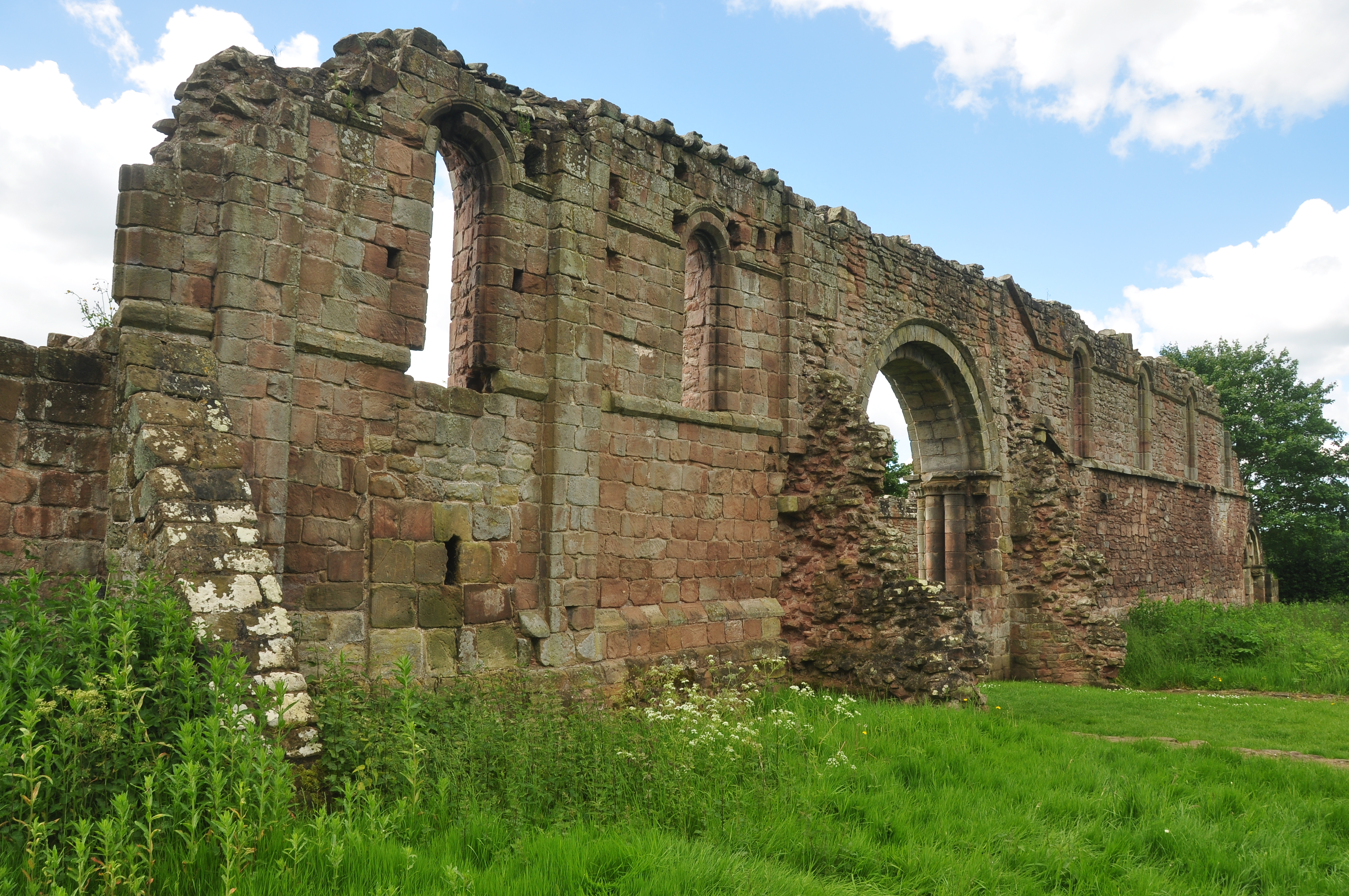
The substantial remains of the north wall

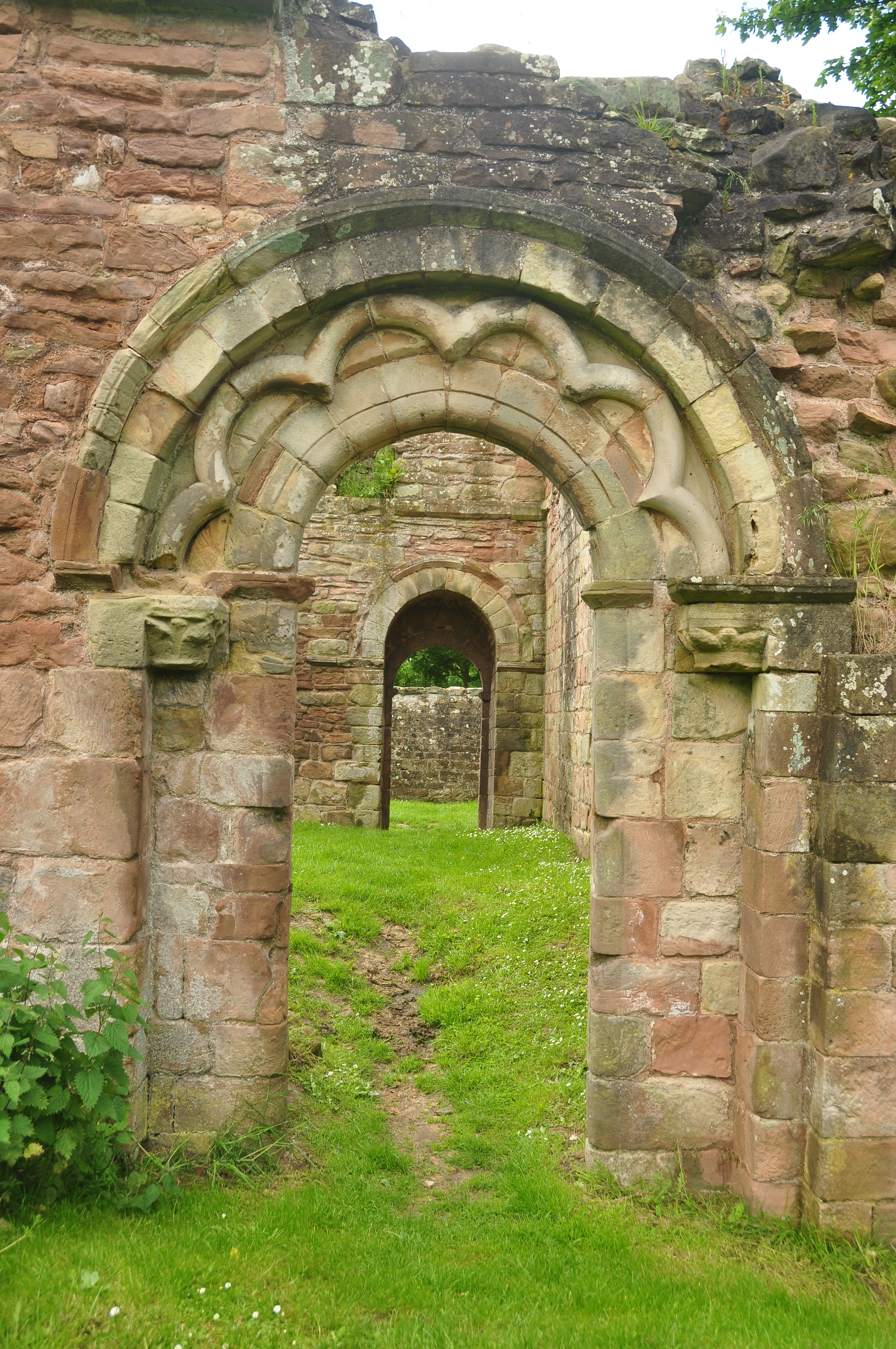
The scalloped arch leading from the north transept, viewed from the west

The church building was a simple cruciform, sandstone structure, with a nave of five bays, and a chancel of three bays. The transepts were small and without chapels. Today, the lay-out of the building is still easy to discern, although little remains of either transept, and only the north wall of the nave and chancel is fairly intact. There is a fine, round-headed Romanesque arch leading into the north transept, through which the residents would have passed to reach the cloister and the monastery. The windows on the north side are largely intact, making it easy to identify the bays of both nave and chancel. The south wall would have been windowed in the same way. It seems that the stone for the church was obtained locally – perhaps even in a field adjacent to the site, as one of the fish ponds seems to have been created from a quarry scoop.

== Monastic life ==
The priory was occupied by canonesses regular of the Augustinian Order. Strictly, they were not nuns, but the term was used of them in the Middle Ages and still is. Although named after Saint Augustine of Hippo, the Rule of St. Augustine is actually a brief medieval document setting out guidelines for a religious life. It allowed its followers more access to the outside world than the stricter Benedictine Rule, and was more suited to a community involved with parish life. Many Augustinians were canons regular, who operated mainly outside the walls of a religious house, and are often confused with the Augustinian friars. As opposed to abbeys of "secular canonesses", these lived largely enclosed lives, in a manner similar to that of nuns, and the residents of White Ladies fell into this category. The conventual buildings are long-gone, and may have been timber-framed, but appear to have stood against the north wall of the church. Charles II commissioned a painting of the later house around 1670, and details of the painting suggest that it may have incorporated parts of the prioress' residence, which must have stood west of the main priory buildings and cloister.

The priory normally supported five canonesses and a prioress, although there would also have been some servants, both lay and clerical, resident and non-resident. Chief among these in 1535 were the seneschal, at that time Thomas Giffard drawing a fee of 16s. 8d., and the chaplain, who was paid £5.

Generally the convent was autonomous, but this was subject to the inspection and confirmation of the ordinary, in this case the Bishop of Coventry and Lichfield. Roger Northburgh was a particularly activist bishop, a zealous administrator and intermittently powerful politician. In 1326 Northburgh intervened when two canonesses, Elizabeth la Zouche and Alkice de Kallerhale, left the priory. He arranged for a notice to be read in churches, making clear that they should, when found, be admonished to return within ten days and threatening both them and their abettors with excommunication. It is possible that there were problems with leadership in the priory, as Prioress Joan de Hugford resigned in 1332. On 29 May Northburgh intervened again when he discovered that there had been informality in the election of Alice de Harley to replace Joan. He cancelled the election and, having heard of the suitability of Alice for the post, re-appointed her on his own authority and mandated his own chaplain to induct her. Northburgh also instigated a canonical visitation of White Ladies while Alice de Harley was prioress, probably in 1338. She was censured for expensae voluptariae, expenditure on pleasure, relating to her extravagant dress and the keeping of canes venatici, greyhounds or other hunting dogs, in the convent, and for a general laxity of discipline. She was warned not to admit more nuns than the house's revenues could support and to cut out unnecessary expenditure. Alice died in 1349, shortly after the initial onset of the Black Death, and the chapter agreed to submit the election of her successor, Beatrice de Dene, to Northburgh. On 29 July he issued an ordinance appointing Beatrice and ordering the Archdeacon of Stafford to carry out the installation.

== Decay and dissolution ==
When Prioress Alice Wood retired in 1498, she was assigned the income from Tibshelf, about a fifth of the total revenues, as a pension, but Bishop Arundel required that she pay for her own food if she stayed at Brewood. From about that date, serious decline seems to have set in – probably because most of the income came from leases at fixed rents in a time of inflation. In 1521 it was found that, although the priory was actually not in debt, the prioress, probably Margaret Sandford, did not know how to render account and two canonesses claimed they were still owed their monthly incomes. In 1524 the dormitory was reported to be in bad repair. In 1535, White Ladies Priory was reported to have revenues of only £31 1s. 4d. Expenses came to £13 10s. 8d, including £5 for the chaplain. The next year's figures were almost identical. This brought White Ladies well under the threshold of the Suppression of Religious Houses Act 1535, which dissolved all houses worth less than £200 per annum, clear of expenses.

Local magnates and speculators began to manoeuvre for the property before the priory was dissolved. Lord Stafford really wanted Ranton Priory, close to his own residence at Stafford, but, as he explained in a letter of 28 May 1536 to Ralph Neville, 4th Earl of Westmorland, this was already earmarked by George Blount, the uncle of the king's illegitimate son, Henry FitzRoy. However, White Ladies would do as a substitute, as it would be cheap at only £40 per annum, if "in great decay." Stafford was at Stafford Castle again in March 1537, when Lutcote, a royal household official, was sent with papers dissolving the priory, but he considered the asking price too high for all interested parties and wrote to Thomas Cromwell restating his interest in Ranton. There were still four canonesses in residence early in 1538. By May, however, the dissolution was complete, and in July the king's grants included several relating to White Ladies. A pension of £5 went to the prioress, Margaret Sandford (rendered as Stamford), while the site went to William Skeffington (also Skevington) of Wolverhampton and a number of the smaller estates were leased.

== After dissolution ==
The reversion was sold to in 1540 William Whorwood and his wife, Margaret. Whorwood was then Solicitor General but soon to be appointed Attorney General. This made the Whorwoods the effective owners of White Ladies, but Skeffington retained the 21 lease at an annual rent of £10 9s. 6d. The Whorwoods purchased the reversion not just the site and demesne of the priory, but those of a number of other former White Ladies estates and other monastic property in the region. These included some on 21 and 31 year leases, granted by the Crown in 1538 but some much on much earlier, very long leases at low rents. In 1471 Prioress Joan Shirley had let a messuage in Overton, Shropshire for 99 years at a rent of 6s. 8d., while in 1484 she had let another at Humphreston in Albrighton for 81 years at 7s. 8d. Prioresses Margaret Cowper had in 1499 let property at Rudge for 70 years and as late as 1529 Margaret Sandford had granted a lease of 61 years.

It was almost certainly Skeffington who built a house on the site of White Ladies, probably incorporating some of the prioress's residence. When he died in 1550, it would have passed to his wife, Joan, who subsequently married Edward Giffard, son of Thomas Giffard of Chillington, the former seneschal. It is unclear whether Skeffington or Joan or Giffard paid off the Whorwoods, but the property certainly became part of the Giffard family's estates. After Edward, White Ladies passed to his son, John, who extended the old farm buildings north of the priory site to create Boscobel House about 1630. In 1651, it belonged to John Giffard's daughter, Frances Cotton, at that time a widow. The Giffards were Catholics and the most important Recusants in the area. They were strong supporters of the royalist cause in the English Civil War. Their servants too were all Catholic. White Ladies was not occupied by Frances Cotton during the escape of Charles II. It was being run by housekeepers and servants. Among the tenants of the estate were five brothers called Penderell. (There had been six but one was killed at the Battle of Edgehill.) The Penderell family were small farmers but the sons seem to have worked part of their time as woodmen, farm servants and retainers of the Giffard family, living at different places in the neighbourhood and caring for some houses such as White Ladies Priory and Boscobel House, which is about a mile away.

Charles Giffard, a cousin of Frances, escorted King Charles to White Ladies Priory early on 4 September 1651, after riding through the night after the Battle of Worcester the previous day. They were admitted by George Penderell, a servant of the house, who sent for Richard Penderell, who lived in a farm house nearby, and for their elder brother William, who was at Boscobel. After failing to cross the River Severn, Charles returned to the estate on 6 September and spent the day in the grounds of Boscobel House hiding in the famous Royal Oak.

Frances Cotton, née Giffard, died shortly after these events, and both White Ladies and Boscobel passed via her daughter, Jane Cotton, who had married Basil Fitzherbert in 1648, to the Fitzherbert family of Norbury Hall, Derbyshire. Part of the house was still standing in 1791, as shown in a sketch by Edward Williams, vicar of St Mary Magdalene's Church, Battlefield. The estate and Boscobel were sold to Walter Evans, a Derbyshire industrialist, in 1812, but the Fitzherbert family retained the White Ladies site. In 1884, the head of the Fitzherbert family became Lord Stafford, and in 1938 Edward Fitzherbert, 13th Baron Stafford placed White Ladies in the care of the Office of Works, a government department.

Whilst the priory is now gone, the remains of its medieval church and the 19th-century boundary wall of the small graveyard still remain and are currently under the care of English Heritage. The graveyard was used by Catholic families until 1844, when St Mary's Church, Brewood was consecrated.

== Prioresses ==
The following list, which is inevitably incomplete, is based on the list given in the Victoria County History account of the priory.

- Aldith occurs about 1225.
- Cecily occurs after 1225.
- Agnes acquired rents on two mills in Beckbury by a fine levied in 1254 and gained various small concessions from William of Ercall in 1256 by a fine levied at Shrewsbury.
- Sarah campaigned against enclosures at Rudge in 1292.
- Joan occurs, 1315.
- Joan of Hugford, who may be identical with the previous Joan, resigned 1332.
- Alice of Harley was elected in 1332 and died in 1349.
- Beatrice de Dene was elected 1349.
- Margaret Corbet occurs in 1377 and 1381.
- Joan Fillilode presented John Janyns, called a chaplain, perhaps of the priory itself, to Bold church on 15 January 1409.
- Isabel Creghton died 1463.
- Joan Shirley was elected in 1463 and was alive in 1484, when she authorised a lease.
- Elizabeth Horde or Whorde was elected in 1485 and was active still in 1490–1, when she issued a receipt to John Newport.
- Alice Wood was elected in 1491 and resigned in 1498.
- Margaret Cowper, also called Margery, was elected in 1498 and is known to have granted a 70-year lease at Rudge in 1504.
- Margaret Sandford occurs from 1510, served until the dissolution and was granted a pension in 1538.
