= Listed buildings in Stottesdon =

Stottesdon is a civil parish in Shropshire, England. It contains 21 listed buildings that are recorded in the National Heritage List for England. Of these, one is listed at Grade I, the highest of the three grades, one is at Grade II*, the middle grade, and the others are at Grade II, the lowest grade. The parish contains the village of Stottesdon and other small settlements, and is otherwise rural. The most important listed building in the parish is St Mary's Church, which incorporates Saxon material. Most of the other listed buildings are farmhouses, farm buildings and houses, mainly dating from the 15th to the 17th century, a high proportion of which are timber framed. The other listed buildings are a bridge, which is also a scheduled monument, and a 19th-century Methodist chapel.

== Key ==
Grade	Criteria
I	Buildings of exceptional interest, sometimes considered to be internationally important
II*	Particularly important buildings of more than special interest
II	Buildings of national importance and special interest

== Buildings ==
Name and location	Photograph	Date	Notes	Grade
St Mary's Church; 52.44297°N 2.48339°W		Before 1066	The earliest surviving part of the church is the original west doorway, now inside the tower, which is Saxon. The tower is early Norman, and the nave and south aisle are late Norman. In the early 14th century there was a major rebuilding when the chancel was built and the aisles were extended. The church was restored in 1867–69 when there was more rebuilding. The church is built in stone, and consists of a nave, north and south aisles with a baptistery at the west end of the south aisle, a south porch, a chancel with a north vestry, and a west tower. The tower has a west doorway and an embattled parapet. The east window has three lights, and the priest's door has an ogee head.	I
Hall Farmhouse; 52.44350°N 2.48374°W	—	Mid 15th century	The farmhouse is in stone, partly plastered, and has a tile roof. It has an irregular plan, and there are stone buttresses. The windows are casements.	II
Lower Chorley Farmhouse; 52.44678°N 2.44528°W	—	16th century (probable)	The farmhouse is partly timber framed, and partly in brick, and has a tile roof. There are two storeys and three bays. The windows are casements, and there is a gable on the left.	II
Old Woodhouse Farmhouse; 52.45005°N 2.48860°W	—	16th or 17th century	A farmhouse, later a private house, it is in rendered timber framing with a tile roof. There are two storeys, three bays, and rendered brick outshuts on the right and to the rear. The windows in the ground floor are sashes, and in the upper floor they are casements.	II
Bush Cottage; 52.44038°N 2.43995°W		Early to mid 17th century	The cottage is timber framed, with later brick infill, and rebuilding of the gable end walls in limestone with brick quoins. The roof is tiled, there is one storey and an attic, and two bays. In the centre is a doorway, with a window to the right, and there is a gabled dormer.	II
Home Farm Farmhouse; 52.44853°N 2.45459°W	—	1638	The farmhouse is partly timber framed, partly in brick, and partly in stone, and has a tile roof. There are two storeys and an attic, and the windows are casements. On the front is a three-storey porch containing a square-framed doorway. Over the entrance is the date.	II
Bagginswood Farmhouse; 52.42932°N 2.46853°W	—	17th century	The farmhouse is partly timber framed, partly in brick, and partly in stone, and has a roof of tiles and asbestos sheeting. There are two storeys, the windows are casements and there is a blocked mullioned window.	II
Pair of cottages adjacent to Bagginswood Farmhouse; 52.42942°N 2.46836°W	—	17th century (probable)	Originally one house, later altered and divided into two, the original part is timber framed, the later parts are in stone and brick. There are two storeys and an attic, a stone rear wing, and the windows are casements.	II
Blundel Farmhouse; 52.44999°N 2.47704°W	—	17th century	The farmhouse, which was altered later, is timber framed and mainly plastered, with two storeys and an attic. It consists of a four-bay range, with projecting wings in front. The windows are casements.	II
Ferny Hall; 52.44428°N 2.43402°W	—	17th century (probable)	The house is partly in stone and partly in brick, and has a tile roof. There are two storeys, and three bays, and the windows are casements.	II
Hinton Farmhouse; 52.43939°N 2.51289°W	—	17th century	The farmhouse, which was altered later, is partly in stone and partly in brick, and has a tile roof. There are two storeys and an attic, and two bays. The windows are sashes, and the recessed doorway has a segmental arch and a fanlight.	II
Lower Harcourt; 52.44224°N 2.45303°W		17th century	The house is timber framed with brick nogging and a tile roof. There is a hall range with one storey and an attic, and a two-storey gabled cross-wing to the left. The windows are casements, there is a gabled dormer in the hall range, and the upper storeys and gable are jettied.	II*
Barn, Lower Northwood Farm; 52.45414°N 2.47385°W	—	17th century	The barn to the north of the farmhouse is partly timber framed and partly in brick on a stone plinth. There is weatherboarding on part of the barn.	II
Pickthorn Farmhouse; 52.45507°N 2.48785°W	—	17th century	The farmhouse, which was later altered and expanded, is partly timber framed, partly in brick, and partly in stone, and has a tile roof. There are two storeys, and the windows are casements.	II
Bridge north of Prescott; 52.43031°N 2.49674°W		17th century or earlier	The bridge carries a track over the River Rea. It is in stone and consists of two round-headed arches. The cutwaters are humped on both sides, and the parapets are plain. The bridge is also a Scheduled Monument	II
Upper Bardley; 52.42185°N 2.44877°W	—	17th century	The house was restored in the 19th century. The earlier parts are timber framed, the later parts are in brick, and the roof is tiled. There are two storeys, and the windows are a mix of casements and sashes.	II
Upper Harcourt Farmhouse; 52.44134°N 2.45817°W	—	Mid 17th century (probable)	The farmhouse was later altered and extended. It is in stone and brick with a tile roof, two storeys and an attic. The windows on the front are mullioned casements with hood moulds. There is a projecting stair turret, a later right wing, and a stone barn on the left.	II
Barn east of Upper Harcourt Farmhouse; 52.44149°N 2.45730°W	—	17th century (probable)	The barn is in timber framing and brick, and has a tile roof. The openings are plain.	II
Barn southeast of Upper Harcourt Farmhouse; 52.44122°N 2.45789°W	—	17th century (probable)	The barn is in timber framing and brick, and has a tile roof. The openings are plain.	II
Lower Northwood Farmhouse; 52.45390°N 2.47406°W	—	Late 18th century	The farmhouse is in brick and has a tile roof with coped gables. There are three storeys, an L-shaped plan, and a front of three bays. The windows are casements.	II
Methodist Chapel; 52.44311°N 2.48678°W	Methodist Chapel	1849	The chapel is in stone and has a slate roof. The gable end faces the road, and contains a doorway with a pointed arch, a blocked lattice fanlight, and a rustic gabled porch. Above the porch and along the sides are windows with pointed-arched heads and Gothick glazing. The gable has bargeboards, and towards the apex is a datestone.	II
