= St Mary's Church, Brewood =

St Mary's Church
- Roman Catholic Church of St Mary
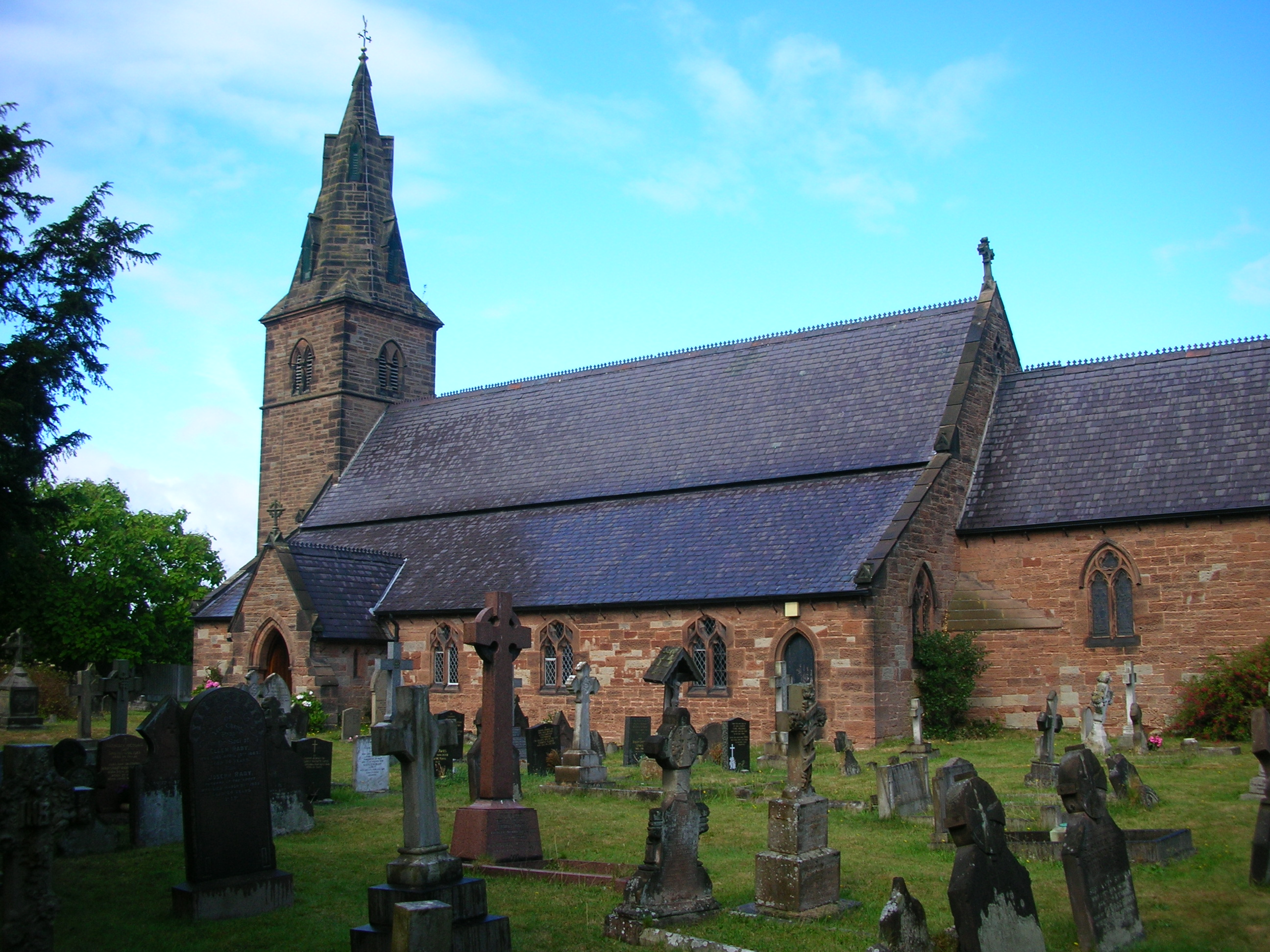
- St Mary's Church
- Location: Brewood, Staffordshire
- Denomination: Roman Catholic
- Website: https://www.stmarybrewood.org.uk/

History
- Founded: 1844
- Dedication: Saint Mary

Architecture
- Heritage designation: Grade II listed
- Designated: 30/10/1974
- Architect: Augustus Pugin
- Architectural type: Early English
- Construction cost: £1,345

Administration
- Archdiocese: Birmingham
- Parish: St Mary's

Clergy
- Priest: Tomas Zuna

St Mary's Church, Brewood is a Roman Catholic parish church that was designed by Augustus Pugin. It has been a grade II listed building since 1974.

== History ==
The land on which St Mary's is built was given by the Giffard family of Chillington Hall; the Giffards also paid for the upkeep of the early parish priests. Once the chapels in the local area had become too small for the parish's growing population of Roman Catholics, it was decided that a church, presbytery and school would be built in Brewood. Between the years of 1843 and 1844, the church was built, under the directions of Pugin, who also donated three stained glass windows to the church.

At some point during the 19th century, a new type of microscopic fungi in bladder senna was discovered in the presbytery garden by the Rev. Philip G.M. Rhodes, from Oscott College. The fungi was named Diaporthe oncostoma.

A small sandstone pillar that possibly dates from the 13th century is located outside of the south porch. It is said to have originally come from Whiteladies Priory.

== The Madonna of Brewood ==
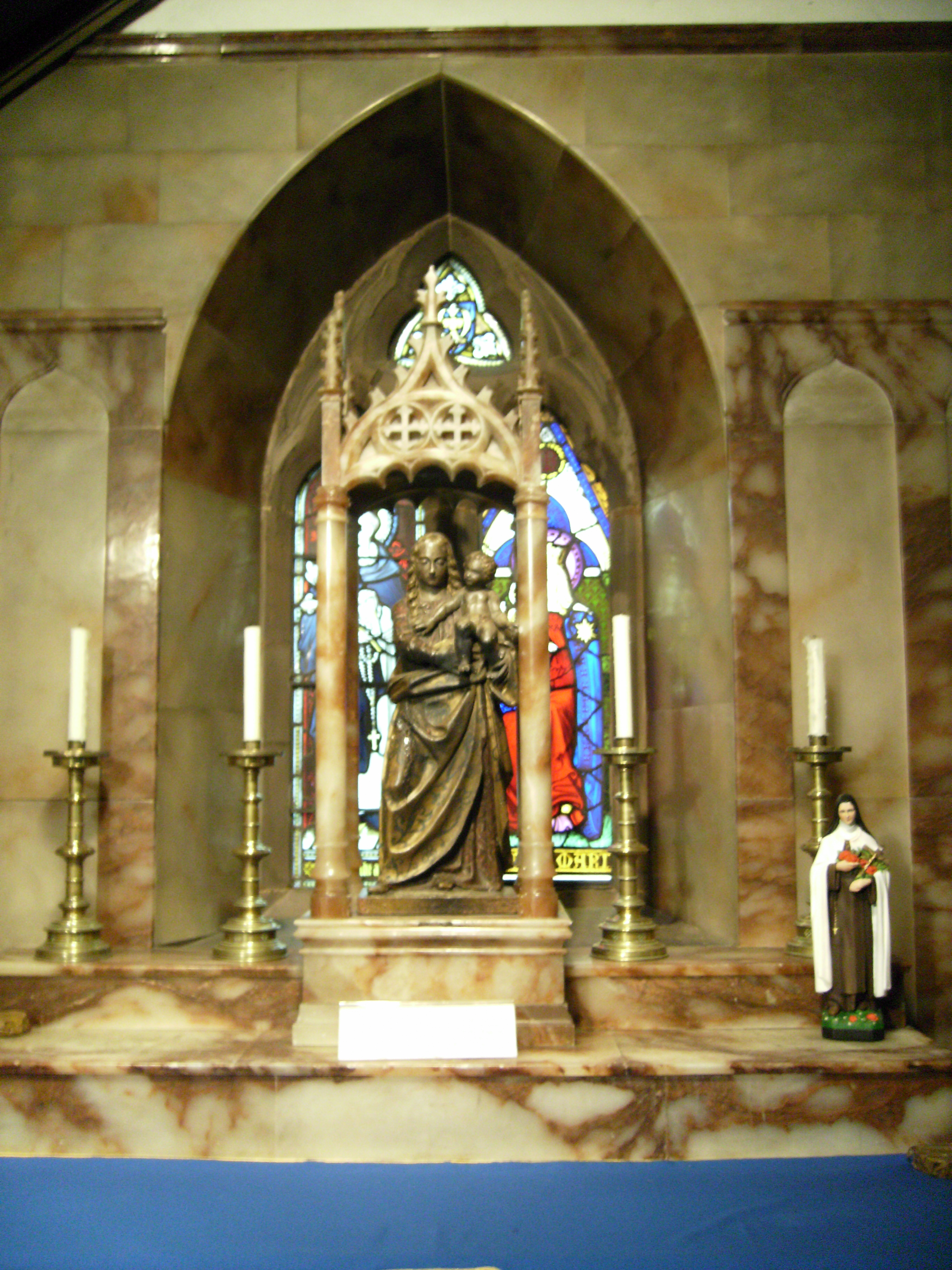
The statue in its shrine

Also called "Our Lady of Brewood", the Brewood Madonna is a wooden statue of the Virgin and Child. Supposedly, the image dates to some time before the Reformation. According to local tradition, the statue was originally kept in the chapel of Whiteladies Priory, until the building was plundered and set alight by parliamentary forces (who were searching for Charles II), in 1651. During the raid, the statue is said to have been damaged above the right knee by a sword stroke, and a hole in the back of the statue was reputedly caused by a musket ball.

Legend has it that the "wound" used to constantly weep a mysterious liquid, which supposedly had healing properties, and was used by local Catholics to effect miraculous cures.

The statue was moved from Whiteladies to the altar of the Catholic chapel at Blackladies Priory, and it stayed there until the building of St Mary's was completed, at which point it was moved to the church's Lady Chapel. A shrine was built for it in 1931, in which it still resides.

== See also ==
- Listed buildings in Brewood and Coven
