= Stottesdon =

Village in Shropshire, England

Coordinates: 52.441°N 2.483°W

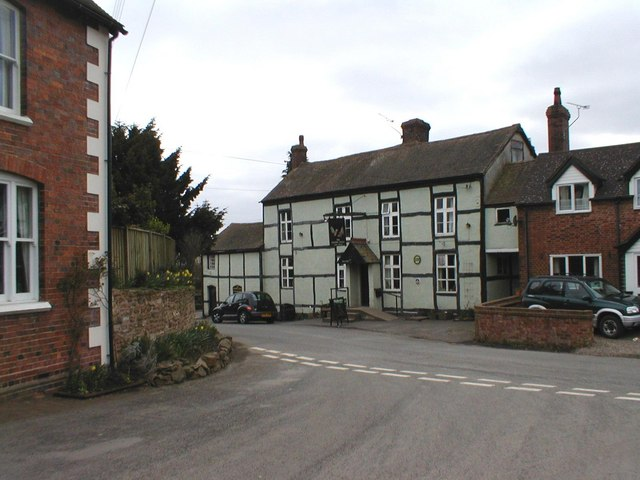
- Stottesdon

- Location within Shropshire
- Population: 782 (2011)
- OS grid reference: SO671827
- Civil parish: Stottesdon
- Unitary authority: Shropshire
- Ceremonial county: Shropshire
- Region: West Midlands
- Country: England
- Sovereign state: United Kingdom
- Post town: Kidderminster
- Postcode district: DY14
- Dialling code: 01746
- Police: West Mercia
- Fire: Shropshire
- Ambulance: West Midlands
- UK Parliament: Ludlow

Stottesdon is a village and civil parish in south east Shropshire, England. The parish of Stottesdon covers a large rural area and extends over the village of Chorley. The village is situated near the market towns of Cleobury Mortimer and Bridgnorth.

== History ==
St. Mary's Church (the oldest building in Stottesdon) is pre-Norman with parts that may date at 450 CE, although the bulk of the church is post-Norman. The churchyard contains the war graves of 3 British soldiers of World War I.

== Facilities ==
Stottesdon has a primary school, St Mary’s C of E primary school, a public house the fighting cocks and post box.

== Notable people ==
- Trevor Meredith (b.1936), professional footballer for Burnley and Shrewsbury Town.

== See also ==
- Listed buildings in Stottesdon
