= Cleobury Mortimer and Ditton Priors Light Railway =

UK railway company

The Cleobury Mortimer and Ditton Priors Light Railway was a pre-grouping railway company that served part of south Shropshire.

Everard Calthrop was appointed Consulting Engineer in 1900, responsible for surveying the route and preparing the construction plans. Construction was authorised by the Cleobury Mortimer and Ditton Priors Light Railway Order 1901 under the Light Railways Act 1896 granted on 23 March 1901, and the line opened for passenger traffic on 21 November 1908. The line had a junction with the Tenbury and Bewdley railway of the Great Western Railway (GWR) at Cleobury Mortimer and was absorbed into the GWR in 1922.

The line closed for passenger services on 26 September 1938. The line was then used by the Royal Navy which had a Royal Naval Armaments Depot (RNAD) at the end of line at RNAD Ditton Priors until the railway finally closed in 1960.

== Route ==
Cleobury Mortimer - Cleobury Town - Stottesdon - Burwarton - Ditton Priors. The Board of Trade report at opening gave the total length of the line as 12 miles 67 chains (20.7 km). Later Engineer's Line References (ELRs) show a shorter length of 12 miles 5 chains (19.4 km).

An extension was proposed, running east from Stottesdon to Billingsley. Three other possible extensions were proposed in 1912 from Ditton Priors: east to join the Severn Valley Railway at Bridgnorth; north east to join the LNWR Coalport branch line at Coalport; north to join the Wellington to Craven Arms Railway at Presthope (near Much Wenlock). None of these proposed extensions were ever built.

== Locomotives ==
The line had two locomotives, both 0-6-0STs built by Manning Wardle and these became GWR numbers 28 and 29. They were rebuilt by the GWR with new boilers and pannier tanks, after which they bore a strong resemblance to the GWR 1366 Class. After the railway was absorbed into the GWR, the small shed at Cleobury Mortimer became as sub-shed of the larger GWR depot at Kidderminster (KDR). One locomotive would normally be stabled at Cleobury while in use, with the other kept at Kidderminster which was also responsible for their maintenance. At the end of the 1940s their place was taken by other locomotives based at Kidderminster including GWR 2021 Class nos. 2034, 2051, 2101 and 2144 and GWR 1600 Class no. 1661.

Following the opening of the RNAD at Ditton Priors, the steam locomotives were fitted with spark arrestors but, after the arrival of RNAD diesel locomotives, they did not enter the armaments depot. The steam locomotive was taken off the goods train at Cleobury North (just south of Ditton Priors) and the wagons were drawn into the depot by an RNAD diesel locomotive.

Three "flameproof" diesel locomotives of 165 bhp were supplied to RNAD Ditton Priors by Ruston and Hornsby between 1952 and 1955. A similar machine Francis Baily of Thatcham (ex-RAF Welford) is preserved at Southall Railway Centre. Before the Rustons, a Planet diesel locomotive is believed to have been used but its dates of arrival and departure are not known.

== Royal Naval Armaments Depot ==
The depot, which had 25 magazines and four stores for naval mines, opened in 1941 around Brown Clee Hill. The buildings were camouflaged and served by rail sidings. Trains and their dangerous cargo could then be loaded and unloaded inside.

In 1960 the railway line was finally closed but the Royal Navy continued to use Ditton Priors until 1965. The following year the depot was taken over by US forces that had left France following the French withdrawal from NATO's military structure.

The depot finally closed in 1968. Land adjacent to the defunct railway line was sold off by the MOD in 1971. Ten farms have been created in this area. Parts of the former MOD site are now occupied by an industrial estate and fireworks factory.

== See also ==
- Clee Hill Junction
- List of closed railway stations in Britain
