= Grade II* listed buildings in South Staffordshire =

There are over 20,000 Grade II* listed buildings in England. This page is a list of these buildings in the district of South Staffordshire in Staffordshire.

== South Staffordshire ==
Name	Location	Type	Completed (Note: The date given is the date used by Historic England as significant for the initial building or that of an important part in the structure's description.)	Date designated	Grid ref. (Note: Sometimes known as OSGB36, the grid reference is based on the British national grid reference system used by the Ordnance Survey.) Geo-coordinates	Entry number (Note: The "List Entry Number" is a unique number assigned to each listed building and scheduled monument by Historic England.)	Image
Sandfields Pumping Station, East Building	Chesterfield Road, Lichfield, Staffordshire	Public Utility, Waterworks	c. 1872	1 December 2014	SK1126508440; 52°40′25″N 1°50′05″W	1187742	Sandfields Pumping Station, East Building More images
Church of St James	Acton Trussell, South Staffordshire	Parish Church	c. 1300	19 March 1962	SJ9373217455; 52°45′17″N 2°05′40″W	1374077	Church of St James More images
Church of the Holy Cross	Bobbington, South Staffordshire	Parish Church	12th century	27 June 1963	SO8081090550; 52°30′45″N 2°17′03″W	1230544	Church of the Holy Cross More images
The Blakelands and Attached Garden Wall Railings and Gate	Bobbington, South Staffordshire	House	1722	16 June 1953	SO8210991580; 52°31′18″N 2°15′54″W	1230535	Upload Photo
Black Ladies	Brewood and Coven, South Staffordshire	Country House	Late 16th century or early 17th century	16 May 1953	SJ8475909332; 52°40′53″N 2°13′37″W	1039336	Black Ladies More images
Garden Walls to East, North and South of Black Ladies, with Gate Piers	Brewood and Coven, South Staffordshire	Gate Pier	18th century	16 May 1953	SJ8478309306; 52°40′52″N 2°13′35″W	1039337	Upload Photo
Dovecote in Centre of Coach House and Stable Courtyard	Chillington Park, Brewood and Coven, South Staffordshire	Dovecote	c. 1730	16 May 1963	SJ8614706880; 52°39′34″N 2°12′22″W	1295254	Dovecote in Centre of Coach House and Stable Courtyard
Payne's Bridge	Chillington Park, Brewood and Coven, South Staffordshire	Ornamental Bridge	Late 18th century	16 May 1953	SJ8581705695; 52°38′56″N 2°12′40″W	1060195	Payne's Bridge More images
Sham Bridge	Chillington Park, Brewood and Coven, South Staffordshire	Bridge	Late 18th century	16 May 1953	SJ8535506494; 52°39′21″N 2°13′05″W	1060196	Sham Bridge
Stable and Coach House Range (now partly Farm Buildings)	Chillington Park, Brewood and Coven, South Staffordshire	Animal House	Early 18th century	28 March 1985	SJ8615606905; 52°39′35″N 2°12′22″W	1060193	Stable and Coach House Range (now partly Farm Buildings)
The Bowling Green Arch and Gates	Chillington Park, Brewood and Coven, South Staffordshire	Gate	c. 1730	19 March 1962	SJ8628606777; 52°39′31″N 2°12′15″W	1060192	The Bowling Green Arch and Gates More images
The Whitehouse and Farm Building to east, west and south	Chillington Park, Brewood and Coven, South Staffordshire	Farmhouse	Early to mid 18th century	16 May 1953	SJ8597205142; 52°38′38″N 2°12′32″W	1039320	The Whitehouse and Farm Building to east, west and south
Shropshire Union Canal Belvide Round House and Retaining Wall, Belvide Reservoir, at SJ 869103	Brewood and Coven, South Staffordshire	Valve House	1827-1835	26 March 1993	SJ8690010300; 52°41′25″N 2°11′43″W	1252181	Upload Photo
Somerford Hall	Somerford Park, Brewood and Coven, South Staffordshire	Country House	Mid 18th century	16 May 1953	SJ8980908750; 52°40′35″N 2°09′08″W	1039352	Somerford Hall More images
Westgate, Forecourt Wall and Gate Piers	Brewood and Coven, South Staffordshire	House	1723	16 May 1953	SJ8832108600; 52°40′30″N 2°10′27″W	1060202	Westgate, Forecourt Wall and Gate Piers
Church of St Nicholas	Codsall, South Staffordshire	Parish Church	12th century	27 June 1963	SJ8661804051; 52°38′03″N 2°11′57″W	1374035	Church of St Nicholas More images
Church of St Lawrence	Coppenhall, South Staffordshire	Parish Church	Early 13th century	2 January 1986	SJ9077519409; 52°46′20″N 2°08′17″W	1178330	Church of St Lawrence More images
Church of St Mary	Enville, South Staffordshire	Parish Church	12th century	27 June 1963	SO8236886836; 52°28′45″N 2°15′40″W	1230632	Church of St Mary More images
Stable Court at Four Ashes Hall	Four Ashes, Enville, South Staffordshire	Garage	C20	6 May 1994	SO7998087738; 52°29′14″N 2°17′47″W	1277027	Upload Photo
The Museum	Enville Hall, Enville, South Staffordshire	Summerhouse	c. 1750	27 June 1963	SO8231786347; 52°28′29″N 2°15′42″W	1278514	The Museum
Moseley Old Hall and Attached Garden Walls, Gatepiers and Gate	Featherstone, South Staffordshire	House	c. 1870	16 May 1953	SJ9316904415; 52°38′15″N 2°06′09″W	1039208	Moseley Old Hall and Attached Garden Walls, Gatepiers and Gate More images
Himley Hall	Himley Park, Himley, South Staffordshire	Country House	Early 18th century	16 June 1953	SO8882491561; 52°31′19″N 2°09′58″W	1230781	Himley Hall More images
Whittington Inn	Whittington, Kinver, South Staffordshire	House	Medieval	16 June 1953	SO8568582823; 52°26′35″N 2°12′43″W	1277300	Whittington Inn More images
Church of St John	Stretton, Lapley, Stretton and Wheaton Aston	Parish Church	12th century	19 March 1962	SJ8867411667; 52°42′09″N 2°10′09″W	1374085	Church of St John More images
Church of St Mary	Wheaton Aston	Church	1857	4 July 1985	SJ8516612554; 52°42′38″N 2°13′16″W	1180167	Church of St Mary More images
Longnor Hall, attached Wall to North East, and Gate Piers	Longnor, Lapley, Stretton and Wheaton Aston, South Staffordshire	Country House	1726	19 March 1962	SJ8672814137; 52°43′29″N 2°11′53″W	1039251	Longnor Hall, attached Wall to North East, and Gate Piers More images
Stretton Hall and combined Service and Stable Wing	Lapley, Stretton and Wheaton Aston, South Staffordshire	Country House	1720s	16 May 1953	SJ8870211723; 52°42′11″N 2°10′07″W	1180222	Stretton Hall and combined Service and Stable Wing More images
Church of St Chad	Pattingham and Patshull, South Staffordshire	Parish Church	12th century	27 June 1963	SO8209699140; 52°35′23″N 2°15′57″W	1188526	Church of St Chad More images
Church of St Mary	Patshull Park, Pattingham and Patshull, South Staffordshire	Parish Church	c. 1743	27 June 1963	SJ8006700668; 52°36′12″N 2°17′45″W	1039330	Church of St Mary More images
Flanking Ranges, Walls and Gate Piers to Service Courtyard North West of Patshull Hall	Patshull Park, Pattingham and Patshull, South Staffordshire	Gate Pier	Mid 18th century	28 March 1985	SJ8017600928; 52°36′21″N 2°17′39″W	1294886	Upload Photo
Principal Terrace to South of Patshull Hall, Steps to East and West and Tower to East and West	Patshull Park, Pattingham and Patshull, South Staffordshire	Steps	Mid 18th century	28 March 1985	SJ8030000894; 52°36′20″N 2°17′32″W	1188162	Upload Photo
Screen, Gates, Walls and 2 Arches to Outer Forecourt of Patshull Hall	Patshull Park, Pattingham and Patshull, South Staffordshire	Gate	18th century	16 June 1953	SJ8022900998; 52°36′23″N 2°17′36″W	1374040	Screen, Gates, Walls and 2 Arches to Outer Forecourt of Patshull Hall
The Temple	Patshull Park, Pattingham and Patshull, South Staffordshire	Garden Temple	Mid to late 18th century	24 March 1977	SO8005299663; 52°35′40″N 2°17′45″W	1374062	Upload Photo
Pillaton Old Hall	Pillaton, Penkridge, South Staffordshire	Moat	1488	16 May 1953	SJ9424112940; 52°42′51″N 2°05′12″W	1039189	Pillaton Old Hall More images
The Old Deanery	Penkridge, South Staffordshire	House	17th century	19 March 1962	SJ9210414237; 52°43′33″N 2°07′06″W	1039192	Upload Photo
Church of St Mary and St Luke	Shareshill, South Staffordshire	Church	18th century	19 March 1962	SJ9443706589; 52°39′25″N 2°05′01″W	1374120	Church of St Mary and St Luke More images
Building Containing Mill Wheel at Teddesley Home Farm	Teddesley Hay, South Staffordshire	Engine House	c. 1837	19 October 1998	SJ9515616110; 52°44′33″N 2°04′23″W	1385728	Upload Photo
Church of All Saints	Trysull, South Staffordshire	Parish Church	12th century	27 June 1963	SO8520694263; 52°32′46″N 2°13′11″W	1232253	Church of All Saints More images
Coach House and Stable Block at the Wodehouse	Wombourne, South Staffordshire	Stable	Early 18th century	27 June 1963	SO8861693725; 52°32′29″N 2°10′09″W	1277064	Upload Photo
Lloyd House	Wombourne, South Staffordshire	House	Post 1799	16 June 1953	SO8875194437; 52°32′52″N 2°10′02″W	1232503	Lloyd House More images
The Bratch Water Pumping Station	Wombourne, South Staffordshire	Water Pumping Station	Dated 1895	9 October 1980	SO8682993727; 52°32′28″N 2°11′44″W	1232411	The Bratch Water Pumping Station More images
The Wodehouse	Wombourne, South Staffordshire	House	17th century	16 June 1953	SO8860293522; 52°32′22″N 2°10′10″W	1232507	Upload Photo
Wodehouse Farmhouse and Mill	Wombourne, South Staffordshire	Farmhouse	Early 18th century	10 January 1973	SO8854793537; 52°32′22″N 2°10′13″W	1277065	Upload Photo

== See also ==
- Grade I listed buildings in Staffordshire
