= Lapley =

Village in Staffordshire, England

Coordinates: 52.7135°N 2.1860°W

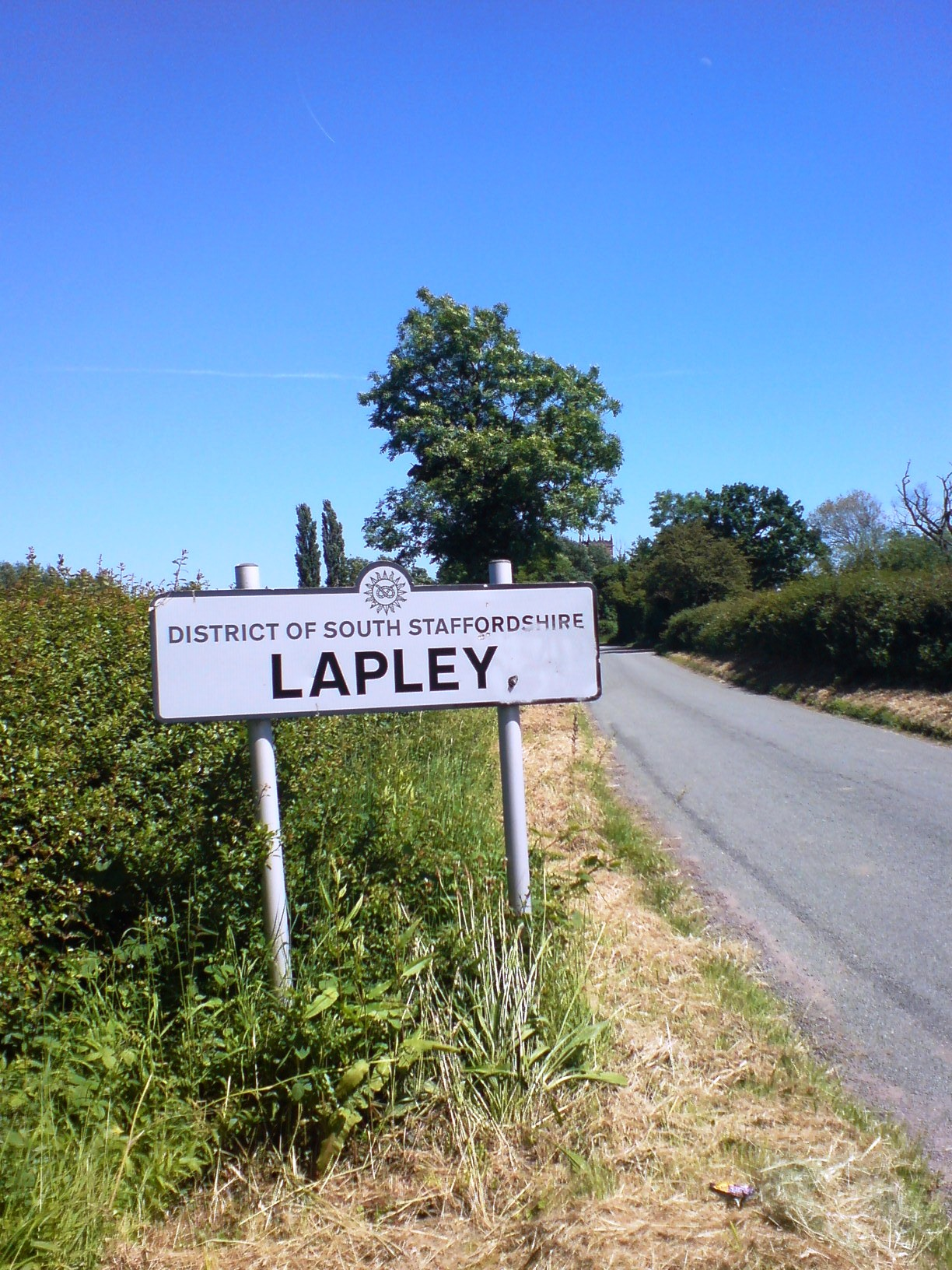
- Lapley village sign, June 2008

- Location within Staffordshire
- OS grid reference: SJ875129
- Civil parish: Lapley, Stretton and Wheaton Aston
- District: South Staffordshire
- Shire county: Staffordshire
- Region: West Midlands
- Country: England
- Sovereign state: United Kingdom
- Post town: Stafford
- Postcode district: ST19
- Police: Staffordshire
- Fire: Staffordshire
- Ambulance: West Midlands
- UK Parliament: Stone, Great Wyrley and Penkridge

Lapley is a village and former civil parish, now in the parish of Lapley, Stretton and Wheaton Aston, in the South Staffordshire district, in the county of Staffordshire, England. It is some 3.5 miles WSW of Penkridge, 1.5 miles east of Wheaton Aston, 0.5 miles northeast of the Shropshire Union Canal, 1.5 miles north of Watling Street, and 6 miles SSW of Stafford. In 1961 the parish had a population of 840. On 1 April 1986 the parish was abolished and merged with Stretton to form "Lapley and Stretton", part also went to Penkridge.

== Lapley Priory ==
Lapley Priory was a community of Black Monks (Benedictines), endowed c.1061, in the time of Edward the Confessor, by Ælfgar, Lord of Mercia and Chester, in memory of his third son Burgheard who died in Reims while returning from a pilgrimage to Rome with Aldred Archbishop of York. It had been Burchard's dying wish to be buried at the Abbey of Saint-Remi and for his father to donate land in return. Accordingly, Alfgar bestowed land at Lapley and elsewhere in Staffordshire and Shropshire on Rheims Abbey, which established a satellite house at Lapley, probably in the mid-12th century. In due course, it was suppressed by Henry V, who suppressed all alien priories in 1415 during the wars with France, before the general monastic Dissolution of 1537-8. Its estates became the property of the college of Tong, in Shropshire. In the English civil wars, the Priory House was fortified and garrisoned, but in 1645 it was dismantled under a parliamentary order. Some remains of the abbey are still visible in the walls of an old house near the church.

== All Saints church ==
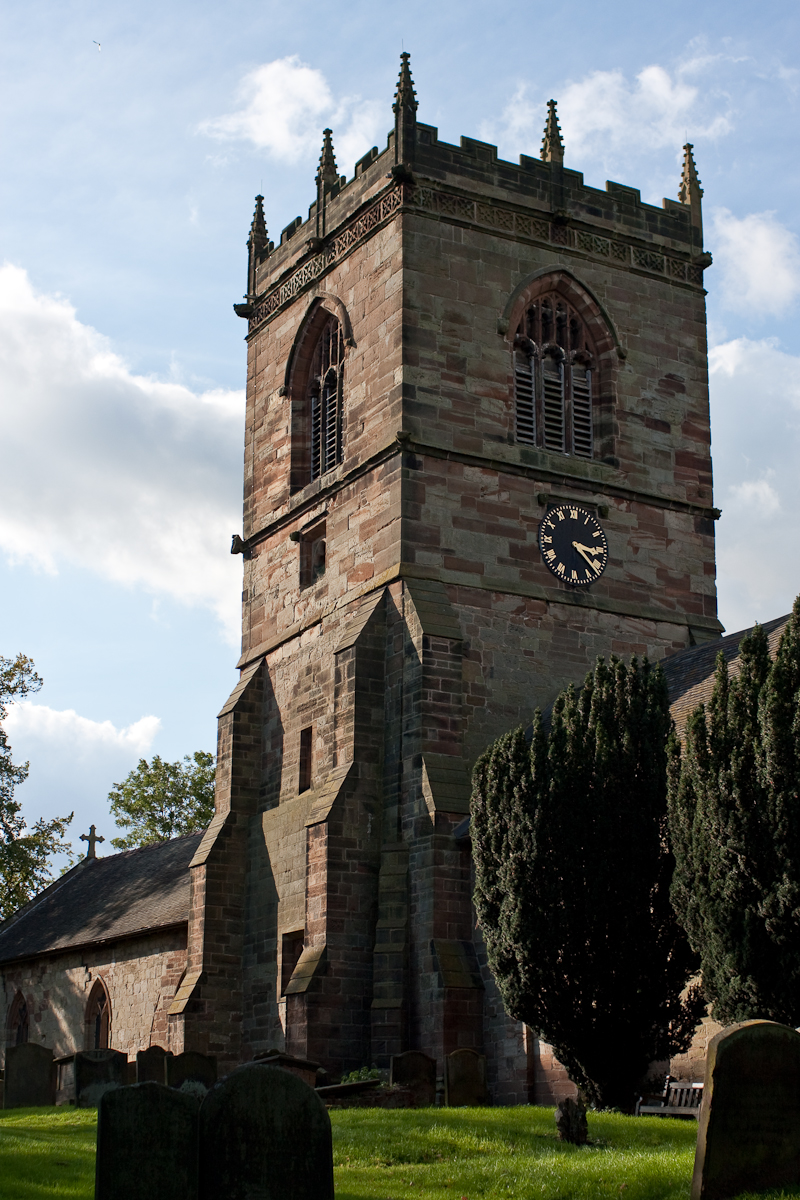
All Saints church, Lapley.

The church of All Saints at Lapley probably dates from the late 11th or early 12th century. The nave and chancel are clearly Norman in age, along with the lower part of the tower, but the upper portions appear to be 15th century. The church possesses many ancient and unusual features and has been radically altered several times in its history. "An ancient map shows the Chapel of Ease was situated here before 1577. The present church was dedicated by Bishop Lonsdale of Lichfield in 1857."

Of special interest is the Dutch carved 11th century font depicting seven scenes from the life of Christ, which was discovered discarded in a local farm in the 19th century and then reinstated into the church. "The font is unusual and consists of a base and pedestal supporting a wide octagonal bowl lined with lead. Carved scenes tell the story of the birth of Christ. The font is of early Dutch origin, no one knows how it came to Lapley."

== Notable people ==
- Clement Deykin (1877 in Lapley – 1969) a British rugby union player who competed in the 1900 Summer Olympics as a member of the British rugby union team which won the silver medal. He played for Moseley Wanderers RFC.

== See also ==
- Listed buildings in Lapley, Stretton and Wheaton Aston
- List of English abbeys, priories and friaries serving as parish churches
