= St Lawrence's Church, Coppenhall =

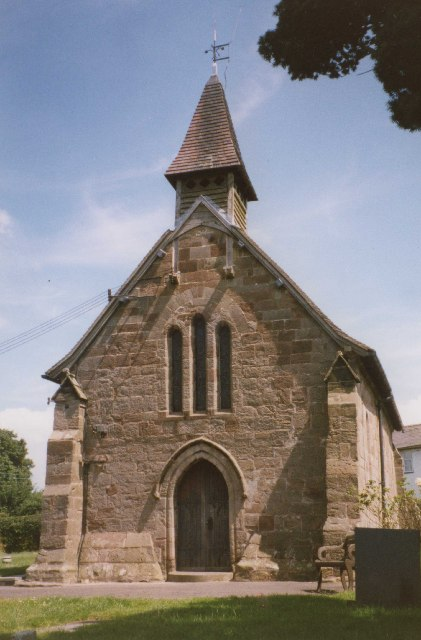
- St Lawrence’s Church, Coppenhall
- St Lawrence's Church, Coppenhall
- 52°46′16.36″N 2°8′21.43″W
- OS grid reference: SJ 90775 19409
- Location: Coppenhall, Staffordshire
- Country: England
- Denomination: Church of England

History
- Dedication: St Lawrence

Architecture
- Heritage designation: Grade II* listed

Administration
- Diocese: Diocese of Lichfield
- Archdeaconry: Lichfield
- Deanery: Penkridge
- Parish: Coppenhall

St Lawrence's Church, Coppenhall is a Grade II* listed parish church in the Church of England in Coppenhall, Staffordshire.

== History ==
The small ancient church of St. Lawrence, built c. 1200, and described by Pevsner as "a perfect 13th century village church, small but of great dignity," is constructed of thick sandstone walls with a spired wooden bellcote, and has capacity for only about 60 worshippers. It was made a chapelry of Penkridge parish after the Poor Law Amendment Act 1834. The church registers commence in 1678 and are deposited at Staffordshire Record Office.

A church existed at Coppenhall by 1200, it being a dependency of Penkridge College by 1261, having also had a vicarage ordained by 1291.

The church was extensively restored in 1866, which involved fitting a new roof, repairs to the windows and gable-ends and the addition of a new circular window to the east gable. A new bell turret was also added with a taller spire, and a stone pulpit and circular font were installed at this time. In 1917, a memorial pulpit and lectern were bequeathed in memory of Charles Mort by his widow Helen. In 1932, an oak lych-gate was added in memory of Charles H and Lillie Wright.

== See also ==
- Grade II* listed buildings in South Staffordshire
- Listed buildings in Coppenhall
