= Listed buildings in Lapley, Stretton and Wheaton Aston =

Lapley, Stretton and Wheaton Aston is a civil parish in the district of South Staffordshire, Staffordshire, England. It contains 54 listed buildings that are recorded in the National Heritage List for England. Of these, one is listed at Grade I, the highest of the three grades, four are at Grade II*, the middle grade, and the others are at Grade II, the lowest grade. The parish contains the villages of Lapley, Stretton, and Wheaton Aston, and the surrounding countryside. Most of the listed buildings are houses and associated structures, cottages. farmhouses, and farm buildings, the earlier of which are timber framed or have a timber framed core. The Shropshire Union Canal passes through the parish, and the listed buildings associated with this are bridges, aqueducts and a milepost. The other listed buildings include churches and items in the churchyards, country houses and associated structures, and a former watermill.

== Key ==
Grade	Criteria
I	Buildings of exceptional interest, sometimes considered to be internationally important
II*	Particularly important buildings of more than special interest
II	Buildings of national importance and special interest

== Buildings ==
Name and location	Photograph	Date	Notes	Grade
All Saints Church, Lapley; 52.71395°N 2.19029°W		12th century	The church, on the site of a Benedictine priory, is built in sandstone with tile roofs, and consists of a nave, a chancel and a central tower. The tower has four stages, with gargoyles, a frieze with quatrefoils, and an embattled parapet with crocketed pinnacles. The lower part of the tower is Norman, and the top part is Perpendicular. There is also Norman masonry in the nave and the chancel, including a large south window.	I
St John's Church, Stretton; 52.70258°N 2.16904°W		12th century	The church was largely rebuilt in the 19th century. It is in sandstone with tile roofs, and consists of a nave, a south porch, north and south transepts, and a chancel. On the west gable is a bellcote. There is Norman material in the chancel, and the east window has three lights.	II*
Churchyard Cross, Lapley; 52.71380°N 2.19029°W	—	15th century (possible)	The cross is in the churchyard of All Saints Church, the shaft dating from the 19th century. The cross is in stone, and has a three-tiered stepped base, a plinth, a square shaft with a chamfered arris in two rises, and a moulded head.	II
Lapley Court; 52.71357°N 2.18749°W		16th century	A farmhouse, later a private house, it has been extended. It is timber framed with cruck construction, some painted and rendered brick, and tile roofs. There are two storeys, and three parallel gabled ranges. The windows are casements, and internally there are three cruck bays.	II
Heath Cottage, Wheaton Aston; 52.71293°N 2.21792°W	—	Late 16th century	The house, originally two cottages, has a timber framed core with cruck construction. The exterior walls are in rendered brick and the roof is tiled. It has two storeys and three bays, and the windows are casements. There is an exposed truncated cruck truss on the gable end, and another internally.	II
Lapley Manor; 52.71416°N 2.19008°W	—	Late 16th century	A timber framed house with painted brick infill and a tile roof. There are two storeys, two bays, and a cross-wing. The windows are casements.	II
Lapley Hall; 52.71315°N 2.18924°W	—	17th century	The house was substantially altered in 1875, and is in red brick with stone dressings, quoins, and a red tile roof. There are two storeys and an attic, and a T-shaped plan. The porch has a Tudor arched head with a hood mould stepped over a coat of arms. On the front is a mullioned and transomed bay window, and the other windows are mullioned sashes. To the left is a massive chimney stack with a stepped buttress containing a niche.	II
Magpie Cottage, Stretton; 52.70160°N 2.17087°W		17th century	The cottage was refaced at the rear in the 19th century. It is timber framed with infill and the rear walls in painted brick, and a brown tile roof. There are two storeys and an attic, and two bays, and the windows are casements.	II
Main Farmhouse, Wheaton Aston; 52.71133°N 2.22045°W		17th century	The earliest part is the rear wing, with the main front range dating from the early 19th century. The rear wing is timber framed, the main range is in rendered red brick, and the roof is tiled. There are two storeys, and the main range has two bays. The windows are casements with segmental heads.	II
Malthouse Farmhouse, Wheaton Aston; 52.71270°N 2.22251°W	—	17th century	The farmhouse was later extended and partly refaced. The original part is timber framed, the infill, refacing and extension are in brick, and the roof has brown tiles. There is a dentilled eaves course, two storeys, three bays, and a later projecting gabled wing. The doorway has a moulded surround, and the windows are casements.	II
Bedford Cottage, Wheaton Aston; 52.71003°N 2.21969°W	—	Late 17th century	A timber framed house with painted brick infill, the gable ends rebuilt in brick, and a blue tile roof. There are two storeys and two bays. The central doorway is flanked by fixed windows, and the upper floor contains sash windows.	II
The Ramblers, Wheaton Aston; 52.71194°N 2.21996°W	—	Late 17th century	A timber framed house with painted brick infill, some rendered refacing, and a blue tile roof. There are two storeys and three bays. On the front is a porch, two bay windows, and the other windows are casements.	II
Headstone, All Saints Church; 52.71384°N 2.19036°W	—	c. 1696	The headstone is in the churchyard and is in stone. It has a pedimented head, and on it are carved a skull and crossbones, and a winged cherub. Apart from the date, the inscription is illegible.	II
Herbert Memorial, Lapley; 52.71379°N 2.19038°W	—	Early 18th century	The memorial is in the churchyard of All Saints Church, and is to the memory of John Herbert. It is in stone and consists of a double headstone. The headstone has a swan-necked head and bas relief carving with two arches, a central pilaster, twinned inscriptions, and festoons of foliage.	II
Stretton Hall and service and stable wing 52.70304°N 2.16854°W		Early 18th century	A country house that was extended in the 1860s. It is in red brick with stone dressings, quoins, and a hipped slate roof. The house has a moulded plinth, a string course, a modillion cornice, and a parapet with urn finials on the corners. There are three storeys and a front of nine bays. In the centre is a portico with Tuscan columns. The windows are sashes, those in the middle three bays with Gibbs surrounds, and the central window is blocked by inscribed stone plaques. Attached to the north is a combined service and stable wing.	II*
Longnor Hall, wall and gate piers 52.72476°N 2.19793°W		1726	A small country house in red brick with stone dressings, quoins, a parapet with urns, and a flat roof. There are three storeys and a south front of seven bays, the middle three bays projecting under a moulded pediment, and a lower kitchen range. In the centre is a doorway with a Gibbs surround and a pediment, and the windows are sashes with keystones and aprons. To the northeast is a curved wall enclosing the stable yard in red brick with stone dressings, and it contains gate piers.	II*
Lichfield House, Water Eaton; 52.69650°N 2.14532°W	—	Mid 18th century	A red brick house with dentilled eaves and a tile roof. There are two storeys and an attic, an L-shaped plan with a later extension, and a front of three bays. The central doorway has a rectangular fanlight and a bracketed hood, there is a stair window, and the other windows are sashes.	II
Ice House, Stretton Hall; 52.70516°N 2.17132°W	—	18th century	The ice house is in red brick with tile cladding. It has a circular plan, a domed shape, and a doorway with a pointed arch.	II
White Holly Farmhouse, railings and gate 52.69676°N 2.14610°W	—	Mid 18th century	The farmhouse was later extended, the original part is in red brick, the extension is in orange brick, and there is a hipped tile roof. The farmhouse has two storeys, and fronts of three and four bays. The doorway has a rectangular fanlight, and the windows are sashes, with wedge lintels grooved as voussoirs, and fluted keystones. The garden is enclosed by cast iron railings with a gate.	II
Clarke Memorial, Lapley; 52.71382°N 2.19024°W	—	c. 1764	The memorial is in the churchyard of All Saints Church, and is to the memory of members of the Clarke family. It is a chest tomb in stone, and has a moulded plinth, gadrooned baluster angle pilasters, and a moulded slab.	II
Walhouse Memorial, Stretton; 52.70260°N 2.16875°W	—	1766	The memorial is in the churchyard of St John's Church, and is to the memory of Thomas Walhouse. It is a pedestal tomb in stone, and has a moulded plinth, a copper inscribed plaque, a moulded base, and a truncated pyramidal top.	II
Lapley House; 52.71336°N 2.18764°W	—	Late 18th century	The house, which was extended in the 19th century, is in red brick on a plinth, with stone dressings, a moulded eaves cornice. a parapet and a tile roof. There are two storeys, three bays, and a single-bay extension to the left. The central doorway has pilasters, a fanlight, and a flat hood on moulded brackets. The windows in the main range are tripartite sashes with round-headed lights and hood moulds. The extension contains a large semicircular bay window.	II
The Old Vicarage, Lapley; 52.71392°N 2.18872°W	—	Late 18th century	The vicarage, later a private house, is in red brick with a dentilled eaves course and a red tile roof. There are three storeys and three bays. In the centre is a doorway with pilasters, a semicircular fanlight with a soffit above, and an open pediment. To the left is a bay window, and the other windows are sashes with segmental heads.	II
Woodlands Farmhouse, Stretton; 52.70172°N 2.17235°W	—	Late 18th century	A red brick farmhouse with a dentilled eaves band, a parapet and a tile roof. There are two storeys and an attic, and three bays. On the front is a Gothic porch, and the windows are three-light casements with segmental heads.	II
Wood House Farmhouse, Stretton; 52.70254°N 2.17206°W	—	Late 18th century	A red brick farmhouse with bands and a tile roof. There are two storeys and an attic, two parallel ranges, and a front of three bays. The central doorway has a segmental head, and the windows are casements, also with segmental heads.	II
Webb Memorial, Lapley; 52.71386°N 2.19011°W	—	1803	The memorial is in the churchyard of All Saints Church, and is to the memory of Joseph Webb. It is a chest tomb in stone, and has a moulded plinth, reeded angle pilasters, and a moulded slab.	II
Farmer Memorial, Lapley; 52.71385°N 2.19023°W	—	1813	The memorial is in the churchyard of All Saints Church, and is to the memory of Thomas Farmer. It is a pedestal tomb in stone, and has a moulded plinth, a moulded base, and a truncated pyramidal top.	II
Bowker Memorial, Stretton; 52.70246°N 2.16930°W	—	1817	The memorial is in the churchyard of St John's Church, and is to the memory of Thomas Bowker. It is a pedestal tomb in stone, and has a moulded plinth, a moulded base, and is surmounted by an urn with a gadrooned base and a reeded rim.	II
Heally Memorial, Lapley; 52.71391°N 2.19018°W	—	1824	The memorial is in the churchyard of All Saints Church, and is to the memory of John Heally. It is a chest tomb in stone, and has a chamfered plinth, moulded pilaster strips at the angles, and a moulded slab.	II
Church Farmhouse, Wheaton Aston; 52.71079°N 2.22051°W		Early 19th century	A red brick house on a blue brick plinth, with painted stone dressings, and a brown tile roof with verge parapets and moulded kneelers. There are two storeys and four bays. On the front and on the left gable end are doorways, each with pilasters, a rectangular fanlight, and a cornice. The windows are sashes with stone sills, lintels incised as voussoirs, and moulded keystones.	II
Grey House Farmhouse, railings and gateway, Wheaton Aston; 52.71032°N 2.22416°W		Early 19th century	The farmhouse is in red brick, rendered on the front, and with a Welsh slate roof. There are two storeys and three bays. The central doorway has pilasters and a cornice hood on carved console brackets, and the windows are casements. At the front of the garden are cast iron railings and pillars in brick and stone.	II
Milepost at SJ 866118; 52.70406°N 2.19899°W		Early 19th century	The mile post is on the towpath of the Shropshire Union Canal, and is in cast iron. It has a circular post, a domed top, and a cambered plate divided into thee panels inscribed with the distances to Nantwich, Autherley Junction and Norbury Junction.	II
Stretton Mill Farmhouse; 52.69558°N 2.15551°W	—	Early 19th century	A mill house, later a farmhouse, it is in red brick with dentilled eaves, parapets, and a brown tile roof. There are two storeys, three bays, and a single-storey single-bay extension to the left. The windows are sashes with segmental heads.	II
The Hawthorns and stable range, Wheaton Aston; 52.71094°N 2.21877°W	—	1826	The farmhouse, later a private house, and the former stable range are in red brick. The house has a blue tile roof, three storeys and three bays. The doorway has reeded pilasters, a fanlight, a reeded frieze and a cornice. The windows on the front are sashes with shaped stone heads, and at the rear they are casements. The attached stable range at the rear has dressings in stone and blue brick, a Welsh slate roof, two storeys, three bays, and cast iron fixed windows, some of which are circular with keystones.	II
Aqueduct at SJ 850 140; 52.72350°N 2.22366°W		c. 1830–33	The aqueduct carries the Shropshire Union Canal over a bridleway. It is in brick with stone coping, and consists of a single tall semicircular arch with diagonally splayed wing walls.	II
Aqueduct over Watling Street; 52.69420°N 2.18956°W		1832	The aqueduct, designed by Thomas Telford, carries the Shropshire Union Canal over the A5 road (Watling Street). It consists of a cast iron span with blue brick abutments and stone dressings. Below the girders is a single segmental arch flanked by stone columns with domed cappings, between which are ornamental cast iron parapet railings. On the centre panel of the beam is an inscription.	II
Bridge No. 17 (Lapley Wood Bridge); 52.70602°N 2.20222°W		c. 1832	An accommodation bridge over the Shropshire Union Canal, it is in limewashed brick, and consists of a single elliptical arch. The bridge has stone copings, string courses, a cambered carriageway, and piers at the ends.	II
Bridge No. 18 (Wheaton Aston Bridge); 52.71046°N 2.20930°W		c. 1832	An accommodation bridge over the Shropshire Union Canal, it is in limewashed brick, and consists of a single elliptical arch. The bridge has stone copings, string courses, a cambered carriageway, and piers at the ends.	II
Bridge No. 19 (Tavern Bridge); 52.71421°N 2.21518°W		c. 1832	The bridge carries Long Street over the Shropshire Union Canal. It is in limewashed brick, and consists of a single elliptical arch. The bridge has half-round stone copings, string courses, a level carriageway and parapets, and piers at the ends.	II
Bridge No. 20 (Dirty Lane Bridge); 52.71601°N 2.21809°W		c. 1832	An accommodation bridge over the Shropshire Union Canal, it is in brick with a stone band and copings. It consists of a single elliptical arch with a solid parapet and pier.	II
Lodge to Stretton Hall; 52.69942°N 2.16778°W		Mid 19th century	The lodge is in red brick with stone dressings, and parapets with moulded bands. There are two storeys, and the front facing the road is in three parts, with a projecting three-storey tower in the middle part with an embattled parapet. The tower has lancet windows, and to the left the windows are small and rectangular. On the front facing the drive is a three-sided bay window and a doorway.	II
Gate piers and gates, Lodge to Stretton Hall; 52.69930°N 2.16768°W	—	Mid 19th century	The gate piers flanking the entrance to the drive are in rusticated stone and have a square plan. They are about 1.8 metres (5 ft 11 in) high, and each has a moulded cornice and a ball finial, and the gates are in timber.	II
Bridge adjacent to Lodge to Stretton Hall; 52.69924°N 2.16769°W	—	Mid 19th century	An ornamental bridge in blue brick and stone with terracotta decoration. It consists of a single round arch with horizontal parapets ending in square piers, and with openwork balustrading between them.	II
Walls, steps and gate piers, Italian Garden, Stretton Hall; 52.70285°N 2.16798°W	—	Mid 19th century	The walls enclose the Italian Garden to the east of the hall. They contain four sets of steps flanked by piers, two of which have urns with gadrooned bases and egg and dart rims.	II
Stretton Mill; 52.69575°N 2.15537°W	—	Early 19th century	A former watermill, it is in red brick on a stone plinth, and has dentilled eaves and a tile roof. There are three storeys and a single-storey wing. The mill contains casement windows, and inside is an undershot wheel and grindstone cases.	II
Monckton Memorial, Stretton; 52.70243°N 2.16886°W	—	1854	The memorial is in the churchyard of St John's Church, and is to the memory of General Henry Monckton. It is a chest tomb in stone, and has pilastered angles and incised panels, and a paved surround with a kerb.	II
St Mary's Church, Wheaton Aston; 52.71046°N 2.22097°W		1857	The chancel was added in 1893 by Charles Lynam, and the church is built in sandstone with a tile roof. It consists of a nave, a north aisle, a southwest porch, north and south transepts, a chancel, and a northwest turret with a spire. Most of the windows are lancets, and the east window has three lights.	II*
Park House, Lapley; 52.71275°N 2.18598°W		c. 1860	A house in the form of a mock castle, possibly incorporating earlier material, it is in pebbledashed brick, with stone dressings and an embattled parapet. There are two storeys and six bays, the right bays forming a three-storey tower. Steps flanked by a carved lion and a griffin lead up to a doorway that has pseudo-machicolations, and above it is a hood mould stepped over a coat of arms. The windows are mullioned with hood moulds, to the right of the doorway is a bay window, and above it is an oriel window with moulded corbels.	II
Entrance Gate Lodges, Park House, Lapley; 52.71240°N 2.18579°W	—	c. 1860	A pair of matching gate lodges in red brick with stone dressings, string courses with blank shields above, and embattled parapets. Each lodge has a single storey and a single bay. At the south are mulliond Tudor arched windows, at the north are Tudor headed openings with a wrought iron mock portcullis, and between the lodges are wrought iron gates.	II
Garden walls, Park House, Lapley; 52.71235°N 2.18617°W	—	c. 1860	The walls to the east and west of the gate lodges and to the south of the house are in red brick with stone coping, they are about 1 metre (3 ft 3 in) high, and are embattled. In front of the house is a semicircular bay, and in its centre is a carved stone lion.	II
Walls, towers and gateway, Park House, Lapley; 52.71274°N 2.18569°W		c. 1860	The structures are in red brick with stone dressings. The wall to the east of the house leads to a gateway flanked by round towers with arrow slits, and all have embattled parapets. The gateway has a Tudor arched entrance, and beyond the gateway the wall steps down, and has stone coping. The wall to the west also has stone coping, and it leads to a round embattled tower with arrow slits.	II
Wall and bee bole wall, Lapley Hall; 52.71303°N 2.18927°W	—	c. 1880	The wall runs to the southwest from the hall, it is in two lengths, in red brick, and about 15 metres (49 ft) long and 2 metres (6 ft 7 in) high. The wall contains an inserted church-style window, and in the further section are four possible bee boles with pointed arches.	II
Coach House, Longnor Hall; 52.72500°N 2.19809°W	—	1890	The coach house is in red brick with dressings in stone and terracotta and a red tile roof. There is a single storey, and in the centre is a carriageway with an elliptical head, moulded voussoirs on moulded stone corbels, and a pedimented, fluted, terracotta keystone. Above the arch is a gable with dentilled eaves and a finial, and containing a datestone.	II
Weighbridge House, Longnor Hall; 52.72523°N 2.19827°W		c. 1890	The weighbridge house is in red brick on a blue brick plinth, with dentiled eaves, and a gabled red tile roof with a central finial. There is one storey and one bay. On the front is a small circular window with cast iron radial glazing bars, on the side is a stone embrasure, and at the rear is a doorway with a segmental head.	II
