= Burgheard, son of Ælfgar =

Burgheard (died 1061) was a son of Ælfgar, Earl of Mercia. He was also the brother of Edwin and Morcar, who succeeded their father as earls of Mercia and Northumbria respectively during the reigns of Edward the Confessor and William I, as well as Edith, the second wife of Harold Godwinson. Through his father, Burgheard was the grandson of the famous Lady Godiva as well as Leofric, who was also earl of Mercia.

Not much is known about Burgheard's life. However, it is known that he died in the spring of 1061 after returning from a journey to Rome and was buried in the abbey of Saint-Rémi in Reims. His parents subsequently granted the abbey an estate in Staffordshire and Shropshire, which became the endowment for Lapley Priory, as well as a beautifully illustrated gospel book, the only known example of an English grant to a French monastery. Although the true reasons for Burgheard's journey to Rome are unknown, it has been suggested that he was one of a number of Englishmen who went to Rome throughout 1061. It is probable that Burgheard was sent to Rome with Wulfwig, the bishop of Dorchester, as his business in Rome was especially important to the political machinations of Burgheard's family, possibly concerning the endowment of Stow Minster in Lindsey as Mercia vied for influence against the encroaching power of the House of Godwin.
