= Lapley Priory =

Former priory in Staffordshire, England

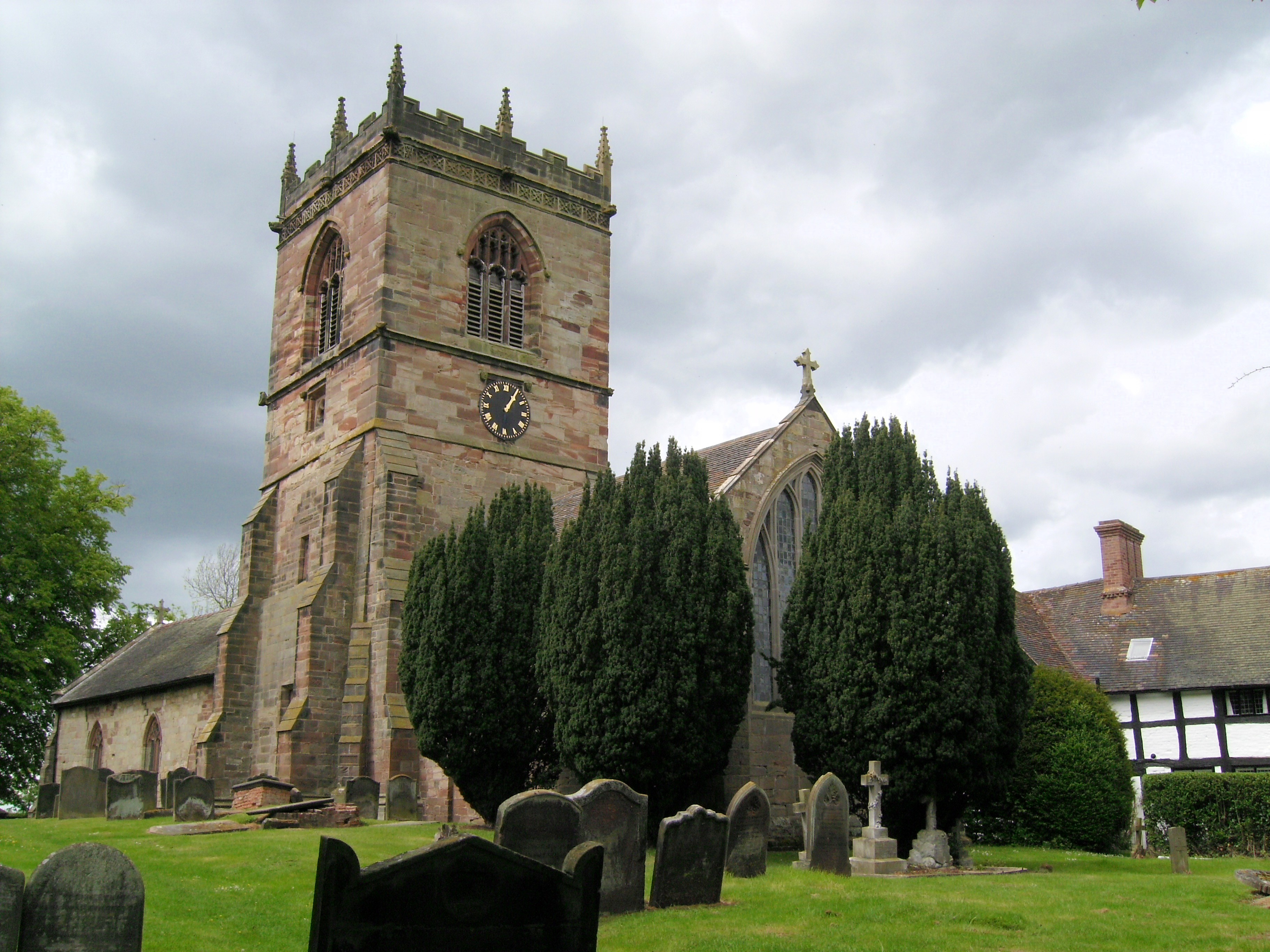
- All Saints' Church, Lapley. Much of the building goes back to the 12th century, around the time the priory was established. The priory stood on the site of the timber-framed manor house, behind the church.

- Location within Staffordshire

Monastery information
- Order: Benedictine
- Established: Land donated circa 1061. Monks present before 1086. Date of priory unknown, but by mid-12th century.
- Disestablished: 1415
- Mother house: Abbey of Saint-Remi, Reims, Northern France.
- Dedication: St Peter
- Diocese: Diocese of Coventry and Lichfield
- Controlled churches: All Saints Church, Lapley

People
- Founder: Land donated by Ælfgar, Earl of Mercia

Site
- Location: Lapley, Staffordshire, United Kingdom
- Coordinates: 52.714°N 2.190°W
- Other information: Lapley Manor is a private residence. All Saints Church is still in use for regular worship.

Lapley Priory was a priory in Staffordshire, England. Founded at the very end of the Anglo-Saxon period, it was an alien priory, a satellite house of the Benedictine Abbey of Saint-Remi or Saint-Rémy at Reims in Northern France. After great fluctuations in fortune, resulting from changing relations between the rulers of England and France, it was finally dissolved in 1415 and its assets transferred to the collegiate church at Tong.

== Origins ==
The origins of the priory lie in grants made in period just before the Norman Conquest. The foundation narrative is told in substantially identical form in several sources and accepted in the Victoria County History account of the priory.

In 1061, Burchard, the son of Ælfgar, Earl of Mercia, accompanied Ealdred, Archbishop of York, on a diplomatic mission overseas. Presumably, this was on Ealdred's journey of that year to get his appointment to the archbishopric confirmed by the Pope, although he still held the see of Worcester in Mercia. The Shropshire historian Robert William Eyton also alleges the visit was at least partly intended to substitute for one promised by the king, Edward the Confessor, himself. They stayed at the great cathedral city and monastic centre of Reims, named after St Remigius, apostle of the Franks, who is buried there in a large Romanesque Basilica. Burchard fell mortally ill and requested burial in the Benedictine Abbey, in return for a donation of land on his behalf. To fulfil his son's desire, and to benefit his soul, Ælfgar gave to St. Rémy five pieces of land: at Lapley, Hamstall Ridware, Meaford, and Marston in Church Eaton, all in Staffordshire, and at Silvington in Shropshire. Eyton pointed out that there were doubts about precisely when Earl Ælfgar died, with some dating his death as early as 1059, but that later scholarship has tended towards 1063, which is consistent with Lapley's foundation story.

The abbey of St. Rémy at Reims preserved a Latin charter purporting to be Ælfgar's grant of Lapley itself.

In nomine Domini Jesu Christi, summae et individuae Trinitatis, notum sit cunctis cultoribus Christi, Algarum quondam Anglorum comitem Ingenium, consentiente Edwardo Dei Gratia rege Anglorum, sancto Remigio Remensis ecclesiae quandam villam pro anima sui filii, scilicet nomine Burohardi, dedisse, quae Lappeleye, cum suis appendiciis, Anglico vocitatur sermone; cuius etiam putrili corpori Roma quidem venienti in praescripto polianeso basilice divina praedestinatio sepulturam ordinavit, quatenus pro eo ibi sanctae servientes ecclesiae Deum semper remunatorem omnium bonorum fideliter precarentur precibus assiduis.

Translation:

In the name of the Lord Jesus Christ [and of] the highest and undivided Trinity. Be it known to all worshippers of Christ that Algar formerly a noble earl of the English, with the consent of Edward, by the Grace of God King of the English, has given to St. Remigius of the Church of Rheims for the soul of his son, of the name of Burohard, a certain vill, which is called in the English tongue Lappeleya, with its appendages; for whose corruptible body indeed coming from Rome divine predestination has ordained burial in the aforewritten burial place of the basilica, in order that for him men serving Holy Church there may pray faithfully with constant prayers to God the rewarder of all good men.

The specific purpose of the grant was held to be the funding of two chaplains who were to celebrate Mass daily in the abbey of St. Rémy – a purpose acknowledged when the priory was dissolved. So the abbey of St. Rémy at Reims already held these lands in the reign of Edward the Confessor, before William the Conqueror arrived, a fact that was recorded clearly in Domesday Book in 1086.

It is unclear when the Abbey decided to go further and establish a house to exploit its estates in Staffordshire and Shropshire. It is possible that there was a distinct priory at Lapley, with accommodation for communal life and a prior as head, early in the 12th century. However it is impossible to be certain that Lapley priory was in operation before Peter Cellensis was abbot of St. Rémy, between the years 1162 and 1181. Peter referred to the brothers at Lapley in a letter to the prior of Worcester Priory and there is an extant letter from Peter to the prior of Lapley.

== Estates and finances ==
Relief map of Staffordshire, showing locations of estates held by Lapley Priory at Domesday.
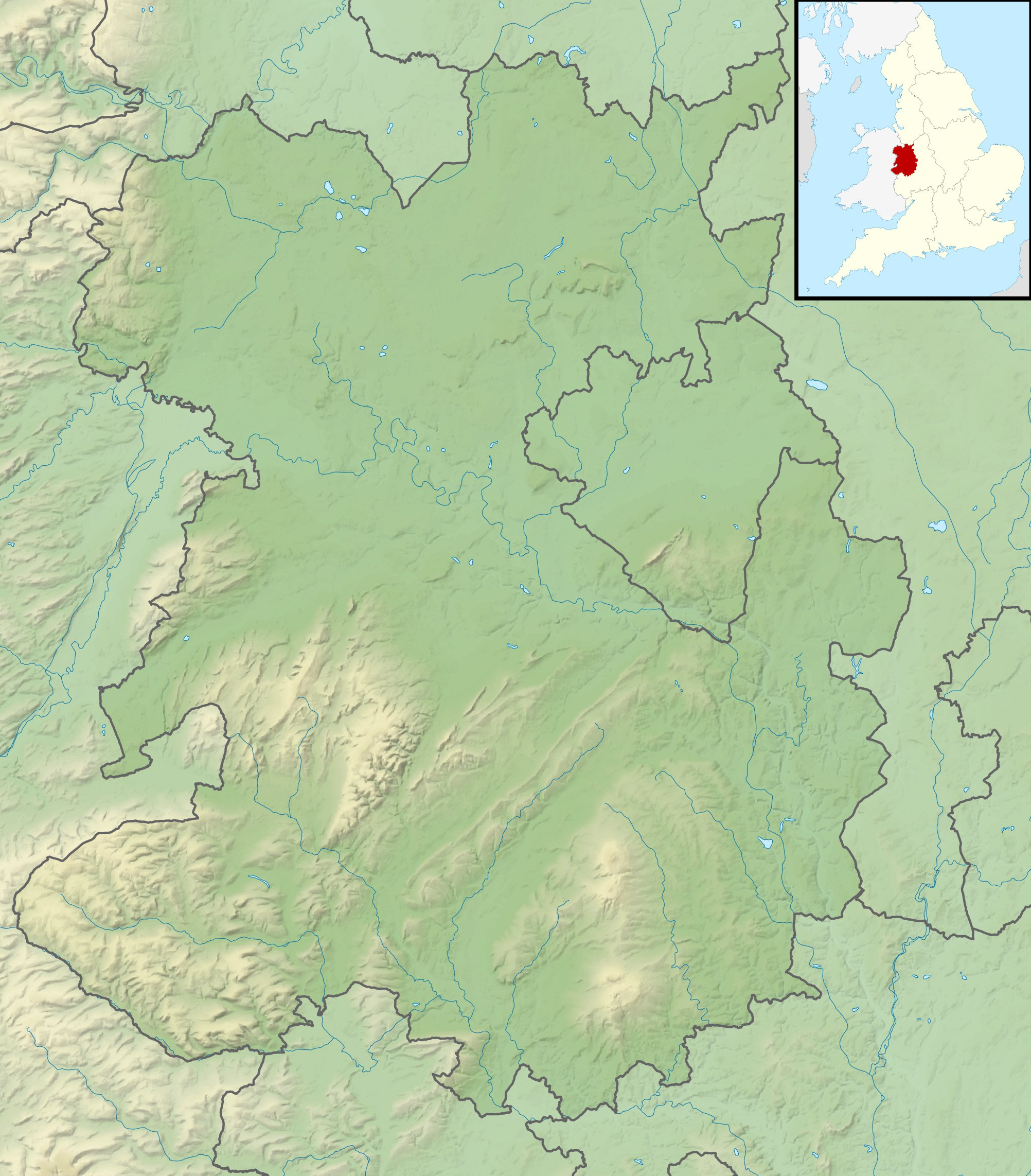
Location of Silvington within Shropshire.

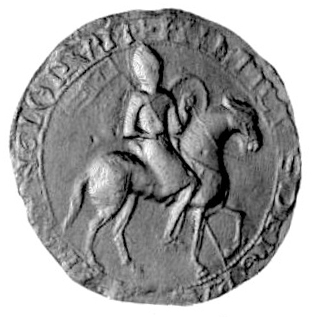
Henry I's royal seal, showing the King on horseback.

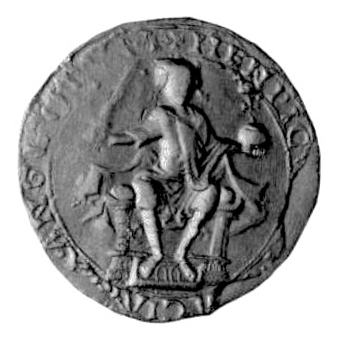
Henry I seated on his throne.

The greater part of St. Rémy's estates were already in its hands by 1086, when the Domesday Book, for reasons unknown, included the Lapley and Marston estates under Northamptonshire, although acknowledging that they were in Cuttlestone Hundred, which is part of Staffordshire. Domesday records that:

"The Church of St. Rémy holds Lapley from the King. It held it similarly before 1066. With dependencies 3 hides. Land for 6 ploughs. In lordship 3 ploughs; 5 slaves; 18 villagers and 9 smallholders with 8 ploughs. Meadow, 16 acres; wood 3 furlongs long and as many wide. Value 50s."

This is clear recognition of Ælfgar's donation, but gives no clue about a priory. However, at Marston it says "Two of St. Rémy's men hold 1 hide. Land for 1 plough. Value 5s." So it seems that there was already a small delegation of monks from the abbey present in Staffordshire in 1086.

The land at Silvington was listed by Domesday, correctly, under Shropshire. It was a manor of a single hide, with land for two ploughs, and worth 10s. 8. The lands at Meaford and Hamstall Ridware were recorded under Staffordshire, with confirmation that they were donated by Earl Ælfgar. The Meaford estate was only half a hide but had four villein families and three bordars. The estate at Hamstall Ridware was even smaller, at a single virgate: it was held from the church by Godric and had two villeins and a mill.

Henry I (1100–1135) confirmed St. Rémy's hide at Marston and its lands in Shropshire. He also exempted the abbey's monks from the requirement to attend hundred and shire courts. Another charter of this reign gives the name of a monk. Godric or Godwin, perhaps an early prior, went to petition the king at Tamworth because Robert, a royal chaplain, had laid claim to the church at Lapley. The king's response reads:

Henricus rex Angliae episcopo Cestrensis et Nicholao vicecomiti de Staffort et omnibus baronibus Francis et Anglis de Statfortsira salutem.

Sciatis quod Godwinus monachus de sancto Remigio de Rheims ante me barones meos apud Tamewrdam disrationavit ecclesiam de Lappeleya, et et decimam et corpora mortuorum contra Robertum capellanum meum de Rotomago, sicut sanctus Remigius melius tenuit et habuit in tempore regis Edwardi et patris et fratris mei Wilhelmi regis. Et volo quod ista et omnes alias suas res bene et in pace teneant ipse sanctus et monachi sui.

Testibus, Roberto episcopo Linc. Et R. episcopo Salesbirie et Willielmo episcopo Exoniae et Goisfr Ridello et Alured de Lincolia, apud Tamewordam.

Translation:

Notification by Henry, King of the English, to Robert Bishop of Chester and Nicholas the sheriff and the barons of Staffordshire:

That Godric, the monk of St. Remi at Rheims, at Tamworth in the presence of the King and his barons, has proved against Robert of Rouen my chaplain the title of his house to the church of Lapley and the tithe and the mortuary-fees: exactly as St Remi held and possessed in the days of King Edward, of my father, and of my brother William. And I will that these and all other things be held in peace by the saint and his monks.

Witnesses: Robert, Bishop of Lincoln; R[oger], Bishop of Salisbury; William, Bishop of Exeter; Geoffrey Ridel; Alvred of Lincoln. At Tamworth.

It seems that the church at Lapley had earlier belonged to the collegiate church at Penkridge and it is possible that Robert was a canon of Penkridge who had revived its historic claim. Henry found on the Abbey's behalf, but clearly the monks were concerned that further challenges might occur, and they appealed to the Pope to confirm their titles to land and property, which Pope Alexander III (1159–1181) apparently did. The papal confirmation omitted the Meaford estate but there is no doubt that St. Rémy continued to hold it, as was recognised by the nearby Stone Priory and reaffirmed in 1367 when the tenant was sued after defaulting on his rent.

A right established by Godric's appeal to Henry I was that of advowson, the right to nominate a priest, to the church at Lapley. This could be profitable, as incumbents generally paid to be installed, although this strictly forbidden as the sin of simony. The drawback was that the secular world, including the local ecclesiastical authorities, increasingly expected patrons of parishes to make sure they were well-supported and well-run. In 1266, the bishop made a visitation, found the vicarage poorly-financed and forced the priory to make a better provision for it. However the priory's advowson and appropriation of the church and of the dependent chapel at Wheaton Aston was recognised explicitly in April 1319 by Bishop Walter Langton, after a canonical visitation.

While Lapley and Marston continued to be managed by the monks themselves, with lay assistance, the more distant estates were leased out. Hamstall Ridware gave the priors considerable trouble, as they became involved in the disputes of the family who held it. In 1242, for example, the death of Walter of Ridware led to disputes about his wife, Matilda's, dower and the prior was called to appear in court as a witness. It transpired that he had allowed the lord of the manor, Henry Mauvesyn, to take the disputed land into wardship. This turned out to be a serious mistake, as Matilda's claim was allowed, and the prior was forced to compensate Henry. Ridware was held by serjeanty - an arrangement by which the lessee had to perform certain services for his lord. In this case the tenant was expected to act as marshal at the priory over the Christmas period, from Christmas Eve to Saint Stephen's Day and to leave 5s. 4d. when he left after breakfast on 27 December. This was established around 1286, when the tenant Thomas, apparently disdaining such a humble service, claimed unsuccessfully that his father Walter had actually been seneschal of the priory lands and he had a socage, not serjeanty, tenure.

Silvington was let during the time of Abbot Azmar or Azenarius (1100–1119) to a cleric named Aluric under an unusual lease. Aluric paid 40 shillings as a lump sum for the entire lease, with no annual rent. His wife, Edith, and their children were to render homage to St. Rémy sicut liberi homines, as free people, not villeins. The abbey apparently took for granted that a cleric would be married. If Alured were to die first, Edith would pay the monks 20 shillings: if he survived his wife, he would have to surrender a third of the goods on his vill on her death. By the mid-13th century Silvington was in the hands of the Beysyns, a wealthy landowning family. As he was a tenant-in-chief an inquisition post mortem was held on Adam de Beysin, under a writ dated 4 May 1261. This showed that, among his minor estates, he was paying 24 shillings annually to St. Rémy for Silvington. A further inquisition in 1263, on the succession of his son Robert, shows that he also held the Edgeland estate, part of Lapley manor, for four shillings. In 1338, after the agrarian crisis and famine, an inquisition showed that Thomas de Beysyn had been rendering a service of only half a mark for Silvington, although he was enjoying revenues totalling five marks from his own tenants on the manor. A fine of lands of 1347 shows that by that time it had passed into the hands of Richard and Agnes Haukiston.

In 1332 the Abbey requested an inspeximus to ensure its holdings were on record. A selection of confirmations by Henry I and Stephen, King of England was vetted and confirmed. This was just before Lapley Priory ran into serious internal difficulties and a series of confiscations that were to threaten its existence.

The priory was liable to pay certain taxes and dues on its temporal possessions. The prior was assessed to pay 3 marks toward King John's tallage of 1199, compared with 20 marks for Burton Abbey. The two are tabulated together and the contribution of these churches is termed a donum, an attempt to extend the tax base to ecclesiastical institutions without appearing to make them subject to secular taxation. However, in 1200-1 the prior was recorded as having paid 30 shillings, with ten still owing. Only a year later did he make a final payment. For Henry III's aid of 1235–6, the prior was assessed at four marks and for that of 1242–3 at 40 shillings.

The revenues seem never to have been large. In theory, the priory was supposed to remit a considerable sum each year to Reims. In 1367 it did manage to send a bond for 120 marks, a remarkable sum in the troubled circumstances then prevailing: although in a time of peace, the monastery had been much impoverished by its vicissitudes in the Hundred Years' War and the Black Death had devastated the region. However, the priory generally struggled financially, mainly because, as an "alien house", a monastery belonging to an abbey in a foreign country, it was constantly subject to seizures, impositions and pressure in time of war or international tension. In 1379 the annual value of all the estates from demesne cultivation, rents and dues was given as £26 17s. 8d.

== The priory and its monks ==
The priory seems to have been dedicated to St Peter: it was named as "St Peter of Lapley" in a lawsuit of 1382. The priory stood at Lapley, on the north side of the parish church, and both were surrounded by a moat. Beyond this stretched its own estate, and that at Marston was so close that they were run as one by the monks. There were only a few monks - usually two or three - and they were mostly, but not entirely, from France.

As Lapley Priory was dependent on the Abbey of St. Rémy, its monks no right to elect their own head. The prior was nominated directly by the abbot in Rheims. For example, in 1233, Henry III acknowledged that the abbot had presented Brother John as prior and so mandated the Sheriff of Staffordshire to help him secure the priory's estates. The institution of the prior fell to the Bishop of Coventry and Lichfield. For example, the register of Bishop Robert de Stretton shows that in February 1362 he instituted Peter de Gennereyo as prior on the presentation of the abbot. The prior might equally be removed by the abbot of St. Rémy. Peter Cellensis is on record considering whether to replace a prior, known only as P., of whom he had heard "evil rumours", with Absalon, a more industrious man whom he could trust. Inherent in the priory's subordinate status was that a prior might be expected to visit the mother house. In 1288 this led to serious consequences, as the prior failed to obtain permission to travel overseas and the escheator was ordered to seize the priory itself. A later prior was more circumspect, obtaining protection from Edward II in 1318 to travel overseas.

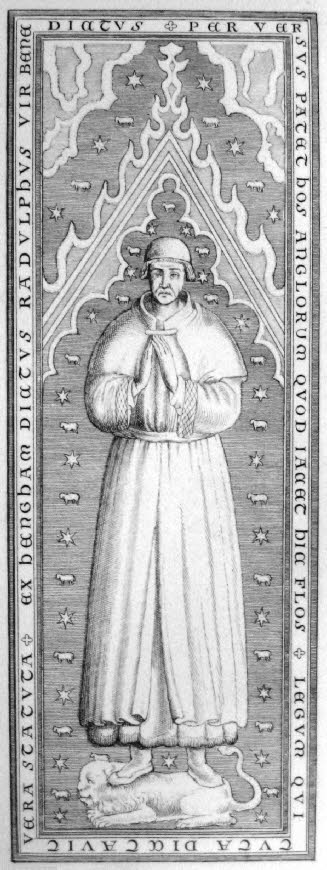
Ralph de Hengham: a 17th-century engraving by Wenceslaus Hollar of his now lost monumental brass in Old St Paul's Cathedral, London.

Essentially the small monastic community acted as the local lord of the manor. They were only too willing to do this when it generated revenue for the parent abbey but they tried to avoid consequent duties that they felt compromised their Benedictine rule, especially its non-violent implications. It was in the mid-13th century that the surrounding society generally started to put pressure on them to discharge their wider obligations. One irksome and potentially difficult issue was that the lord would normally be expected to attend the local hundred court and shire court, where they might be forced to countenance the shedding of blood. The monks were exempt from this, as recognised by Henry I, but it was alleged that they were supposed pay for the exemption, which they naturally tried to avoid doing. From 1248, the SheriffS simply came and took 10s. a year, and, after some fluctuation, the demand was increased to 5 marks. These facts were established by an inquisition held at Kinvaston in August 1272, after the monks complained. The priory was certainly not exempt from crime and actually used secular justice when necessary. In July 1282 Ralph de Hengham, the Chief Justice of the King's Bench, was commissioned to investigate when the prior fell victim to a confidence trick. He had received visitors, purporting to be the king's bailiffs, who convinced him that he was in possession of stolen goods, which they carried away.

Despite this policy of abstention from the ordinary courts, the monks maintained their own right to a view of frankpledge, i.e. the right to hold their own tenants jointly responsible for law and order, and their right to erect gallows on their manors, as well as free warren, the right to hunt on their demesne. The claims they made varied between estates and through time. When summoned to the assizes at Stafford in 1293 to clarify his claims, the prior claimed only free warren in Marston, as well as the right to view of frankpledge and a gallows in Lapley and its members, Edgeland and Aston. Edward I's attorney contested these claims but the sheriff attested that he received 5 marks a year for view of frankpledge. The prior was able to produce a confirmatory charter from only the previous year, granting him free warren in his demesne lands, as well as the right to hold a weekly fair and annual market at Aston. The prior's view of frankpledge had been extended to Marston by 1382, when it became an issue in a case brought by a tenant, Geoffrey Cartwright, against Prior Peter, which shows the priory trying to force tenants to pay for their own exploitation. Cartwright claimed that the prior and William Bickford, presumably an employee, had illegally seized his horse by armed force at Wheaton Aston just before Christmas the previous year. The defendants denied using force and claimed that they had seized the animal as a distraint because Geoffrey had failed to supply workers for the priory demesne in fulfilment of the labour services due from his holdings – a plausible charge at a time of labour shortages. Geoffrey, however, maintained that they had actually seized it because they hoped thereby to defray the 5 mark cost of the prior's view of frankpledge in his demesne of Lapley, Wheaton Aston and Marston – a levy the priory had been extracting from its tenants for some time. The case was long drawn out and a jury at Stafford finally found in Geoffrey's favour, awarding him 5 marks in damages, although he chose not to press this against the priory, instead pursuing Bickford for restitution.

A leadership dispute between Baldwin de Spynale and Gobert de Lapion in the 1330s made the priory particularly vulnerable to secular intervention. Gobert was sent over by the abbot to head the priory, accompanied by another monk, John le Large. Baldwin was already in place as prior and vindicated his claim in 1334 in the court of Bishop Roger Northburgh, which excommunicated Gobert. Baldwin complained that the Vicar of Lapley and other men had raided his home, stolen all his documents and driven off 40 oxen, 20 cows, 15 bullocks, 15 heifers, and 40 pigs, livestock valued at a total of 100 marks, as well as felling trees and Edward III responded with a commission of oyer and terminer. He then tried to achieve a pause in proceedings in 1335 by granting first Gobert and then Baldwin royal protection for a year, styling each Prior of Lapley. This was to no avail, as there was a second raiding party, this time including Gobert himself and his clerk Gerard, which stole another 100 marks worth of animals and even removed fish from the ponds, leading to a second commission of oyer and terminer. The king, on campaign at Perth in Scotland, then instituted an inquisition that was clearly calculated to exploit the situation for royal advantage, asking not only what had caused the conflict but also whether there was any justification for claiming advowson of the priory. The commissioners discounted the idea, concluding anachronistically that Algar, the founder, had been Earl of Chester and not king. The dispute seems to have continued.

== Confiscation and decline ==
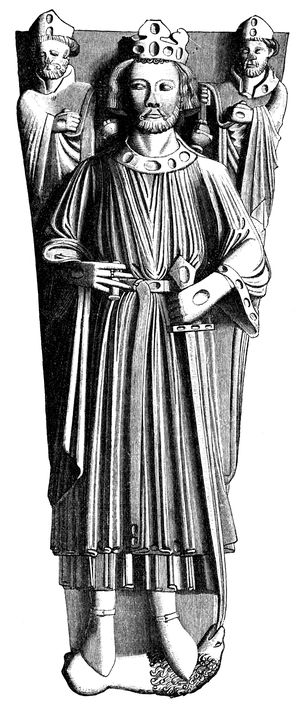
Effigy of King John from his tomb in Worcester Cathedral.

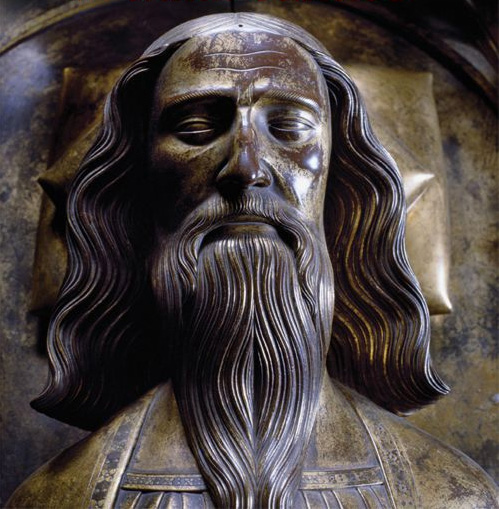
Edward III, from his effigy in Westminster Abbey.

As an alien priory, Lapley was vulnerable to royal intervention in time of war, particularly when the war was against the King of France. In 1204, after the loss of Normandy to Philip II of France, King John seized the alien priories - or at least declared them seized in the hope of recouping some of the costs of his campaign. Prior Inganus was forced to accept that he must pay the price of three palfreys to regain legal control over Lapley Priory. In 1205–6 it was recorded that he had paid ten marks as the price of two of them. and the following year he made a final payment of 5 marks. Thereafter, the prior was required to pay for a licence to go overseas. In 1324 it was seized again on the outbreak of war with France. This time the priory was restored only on the understanding that it would pay the Crown 55 marks per annum. In 1327, Edward III came to the throne, vowing to wipe the slate clean by restoring all the alien houses and abolishing the annual payments.

Edward's resolution was not to last. The Hundred Years War, beginning in 1337, was to result in repeated seizures and, ultimately, the dissolution of nearly all the alien houses, including Lapley. The Crown seized Lapley immediately, like the other alien houses, but in this case it was able to play a game of divide and rule with the competing leadership contenders, who were still awaiting a resolution to their dispute. On 27 September 1337 the priory was rented back to Gobert and Robert de Shareshull, who were recognised as proctors of the abbey of St. Rémy, for a farm of 55 marks. On 1 May 1338 it was given to Baldwin at greatly reduced farm, on the claim that the previous regime had run the property down, and under guarantees of good conduct from Roger Northburgh, the Bishop of Coventry and Lichfield. On 16 July the rent was further reduced to just 10 marks as it was found that the situation was so bad that the priory could no longer support Baldwin or function liturgically. On 8 March 1341 Baldwin agreed to a rent increase to 20 marks, promising, as before, not to remit any of the revenue of the priory abroad. Only a few weeks later, on 12 April, the king announced that others had bid 30 marks for the farm of the priory: he declared himself unwilling to remove the priory from Baldwin's hands, so long as he was prepared to pay the going rate. It seems that the king was being disingenuous. Baldwin felt unable to meet the new demand and gave up the farm of the priory, asking for some other arrangement to be made to support him. On 16 June the king transferred the farm to his relative, Henry of Grosmont, Earl of Derby, one of the wealthiest men in the kingdom. The rent was still 20 marks, but with on condition that Henry maintain the monks and pay their usual stipends. By 1342, Robert of Shareshull was again in control, and in December of that year the king had to set up an inquisition into irrecoverable wastes committed in the priory.

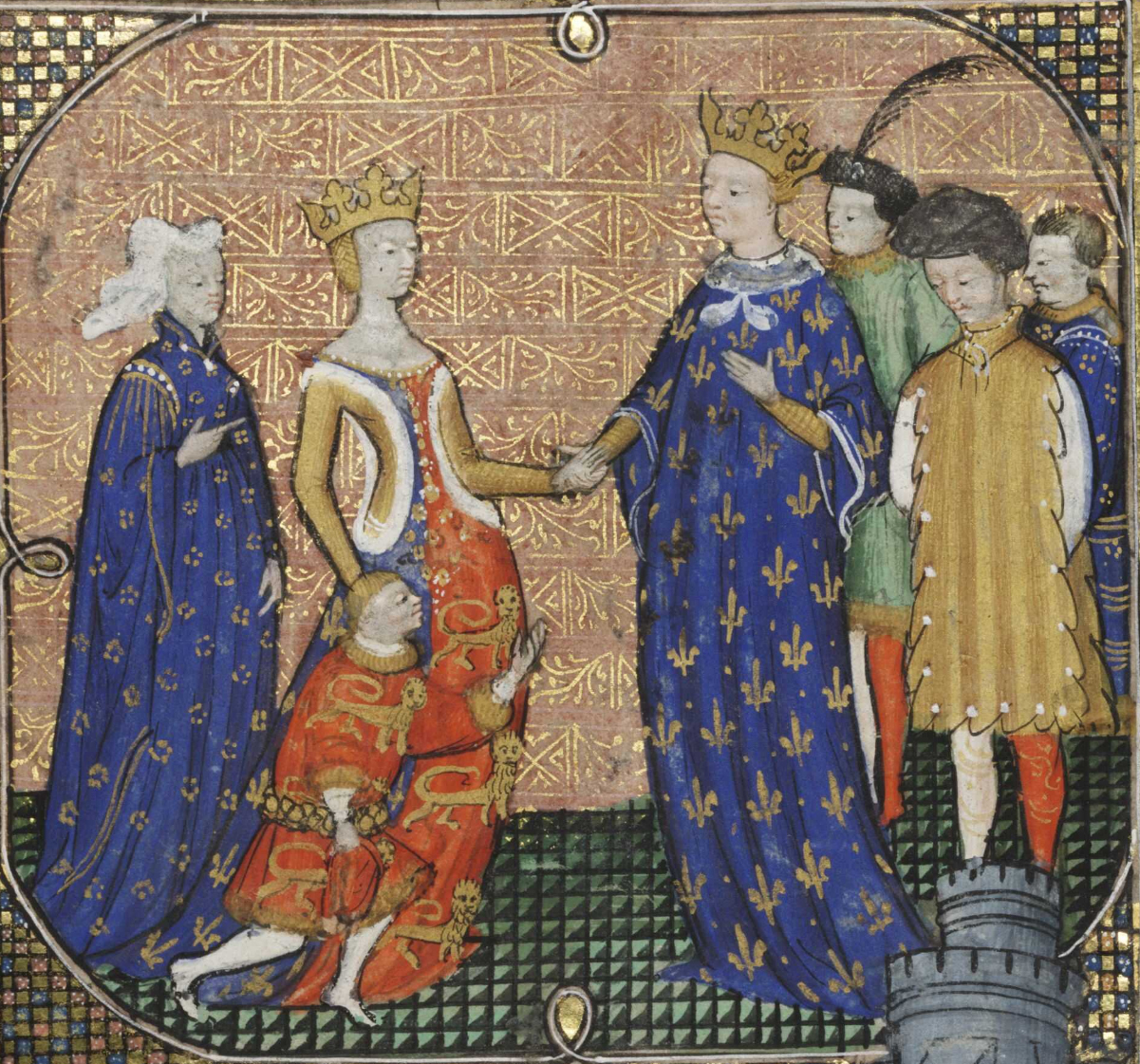
A miniature showing Isabella bringing her son, the future Edward III, to give homage to her brother Charles IV of France.

Baldwin now seems to have found favour elsewhere in the royal family, and this led to a significant shift in his fortunes, bringing short term improvements in the position of Lapley Priory. On 17 June 1346, the priory was again committed to him, on the request of Isabella of France, the king's influential mother, once again at 20 marks. However, this time he was ordered to pay the money directly to Henry of Grosmont, now Earl of Lancaster, probably in settlement of a royal debt. The king decided to summon Baldwin to France on some special mission and on 1 January 1347 ordered the sheriff to postpone collection of his rent for three months. Mysteriously, three days later, he sent confidential instructions to the bailiffs of Sandwich to expedite Baldwin's transit. Presumably, however, Baldwin was back in England by the summer, when he was summoned with other heads of alien priories to appear before the king's council at Westminster. On 1 June he was excused payment of £18 of the rent he owed.

By 1354, the Black Death had ravaged the region, with great human cost and consequent falls in the value of land. By 28 February of that year, Baldwin had reported a great fire that had devastated both the living quarters and the church and brought the priory to extremity. Baldwin had already built up arrears of 102 marks 13s. 3¾., which the king immediately pardoned. An inquisition, established on 22 March, established that the manor of Lapley was worth only £11 14s. 10d. The four surviving buildings were valued at only a shilling each. Two watermills and a windmill were out of action and three ponds were dried up. Rents and services were worth only £4 10s., while the courts leet bought in no profit above the 5 marks farm paid to the king. In June the king was forced to pardon Baldin the further ten marks in rent arrears that had built up since he reported the fire. Queen Isabella seems to have been busy on Baldwin's behalf and in February 1356 his rent holiday was extended to a total of three years at her request. Moreover, at the end of the period the rent was to be reduced to ten marks. However, the exchequer seems to have misplaced or ignored this order and Baldwin was faced with a demand for 40 marks in February 1357. In May the king withdrew this demand and pardoned him all debts incurred up to 12 February. After the conclusion of the Treaty of Calais in October 1460, there was no longer a justification for the king to control the alien priories. On 16 February 1361 orders were issued at Westminster restoring the lands and property of all the priories without further rent. Significantly, all arrears were also pardoned. Lapley Priory received its own notification of the restitution.

It seems that Baldwin died later in 1361, a peak year for plague deaths. A vacancy was declared on St. Clement's Day (23 November) and the next prior, Peter de Gennereyo, a monk of St. Rémy, was instituted in February 1362. The priory made the remarkable contribution of 120 marks to the parent abbey in 1367. However, the priory was taken into the king's hands when war broke out again, and in order to keep control of the property Peter undertook to pay 20 marks annually on 6 October 1369, and the rent was raised to 25 marks in 1377. This arrangement was renewed the following year, when the prior was named as Peter Romelot: it is possible this was an alternative name for Peter de Gennereyo.

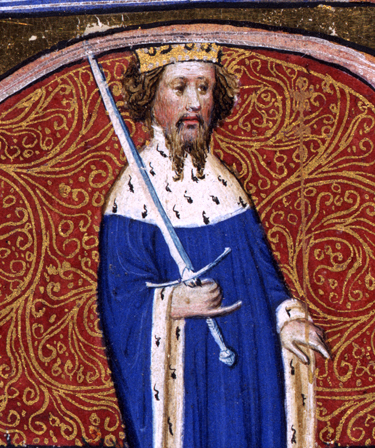
Illuminated initial letter showing Henry IV from the records of the Duchy of Lancaster.

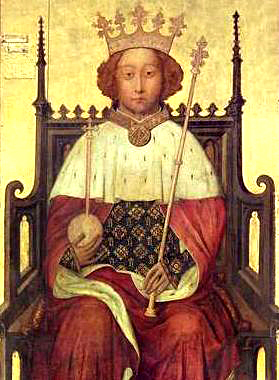
Portrait of Richard II, 1390s.

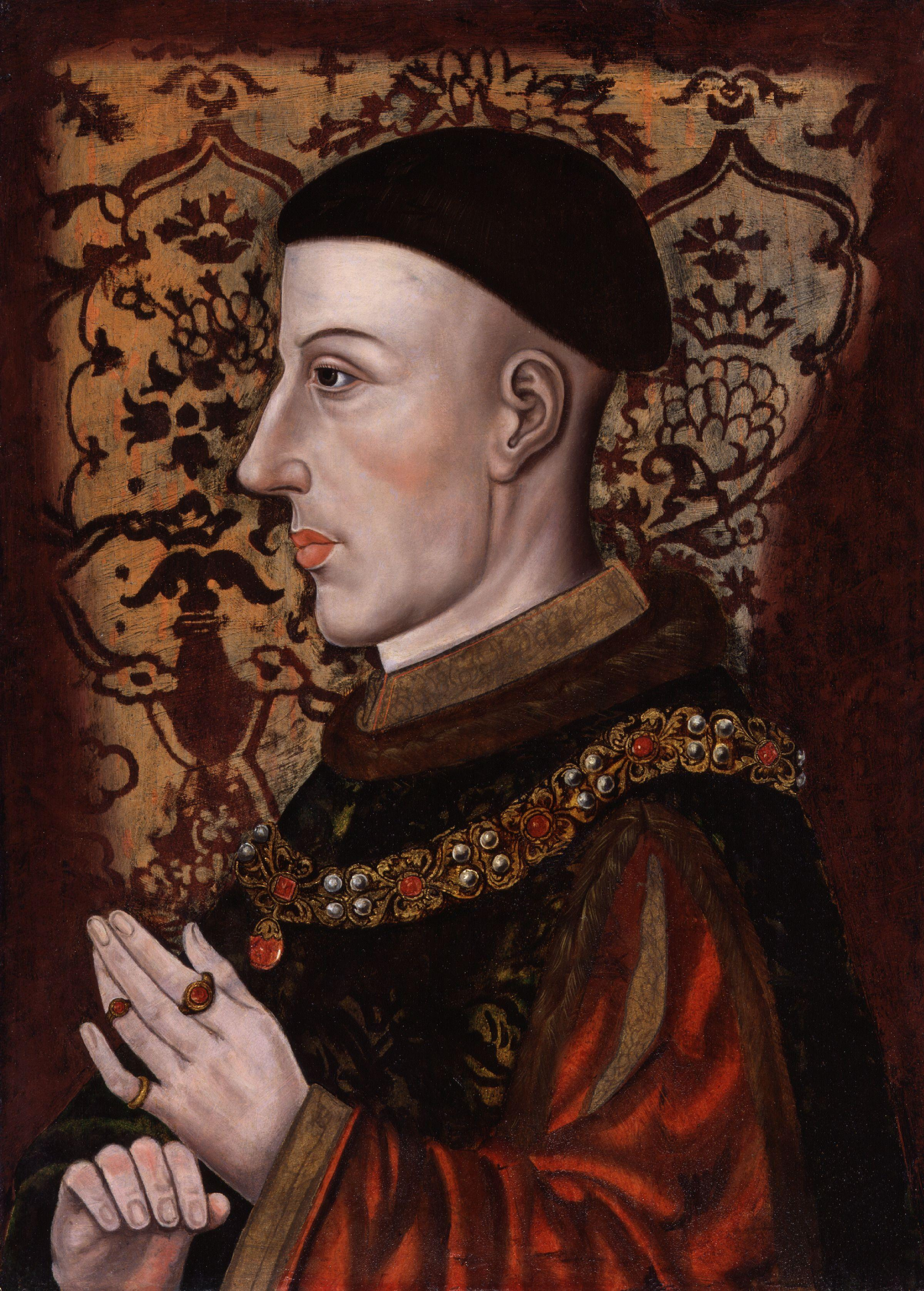
Henry V.

Lapley was spared when most of the other alien houses were seized in 1378 and their occupants expelled from the country. However, on 8 November 1384 Lapley was granted to Richard II's esquire, Richard de Hampton, free of charge. On 17 May 1386 Peter secured a lease of the priory from Hampton on disadvantageous and restrictive terms. Not only was the annual rent set at £40 13s. 4d., but the prior had to pay for view of frankpledge and was given only fifteen days to make rent payments before the property reverted to Hampton. However, from Michaelmas 1388 Peter was again allowed to take on the farm of the priory, at a rent of £20, although on a hefty Mainprise of £40, to fall equally on him and his two guarantors. In July 1397 the arrangement was altered, so that Peter took on the priory jointly with Geoffrey Stafford, an Augustinian canon regular of Ranton Priory. Only months later, in October, this was altered again, with Peter taking on two joint farmers of the priory: John Bally, a monk of Lapley Priory, and Thomas Marton, a cleric. It seems likely that Peter had been struggling, perhaps with failing health, as he disappears from the record around this time and on 30 June 1398 a lifetime grant of the priory was made to another esquire of the king, William Walshale. It was explicitly recorded that this was in exchange for Walshale's herbage and pannage, i.e. grazing rights, in Delamere Forest, Cheshire. In August the £20 rent was remitted for the duration of the war with France.

Henry IV restored the alien priories to their owners but the opposition of the House of Commons forced him to reconsider. He warned the prior of Lapley, along with the heads of other alien priories in December 1402 to bring documentation to Westminster to show whether their houses were conventual, presumably meaning whether they were self-governing under a chapter. They were told that those that were not would again be taken into the king's hands. Lapley was clearly no more than a monastic cell of St. Rémy and in January 1403 was committed to a monk, Ralph Wybunbery, for 40 marks per year. The following month it was committed instead to John Bally, now promoted to prior, and two others: John Findern and Thomas de Walton. The rent was now set at 40 marks.

The aggrieved William Walshale now requested an exemplification of his position in relation to a petition of the previous parliament, which had sought to protect the incomes of those with continuing interests in alien priories. He was awarded £20 a year to compensate him for the losses he suffered by exchanging his interests in Cheshire for the priory in the reign of Richard II. On 1 July 1409 a further 10 marks of the priory's rent was earmarked for Joan of Navarre, Queen of England, one of a large number of revenues Henry IV granted to his wife as part of the 10,000 marks promised after their wedding. In November 1413 the priory was committed to Prior John Bally, John Knightley and a monk, William Kanc (Cannock), with the rent slightly increased to 42 marks. From this, Henry V increased the payment to his step-mother, Queen Joan, to 12 marks. Presumably Walshale had now died, as £20 or 30 marks remained for the king to sign away to an esquire, John Vale, in February 1415.

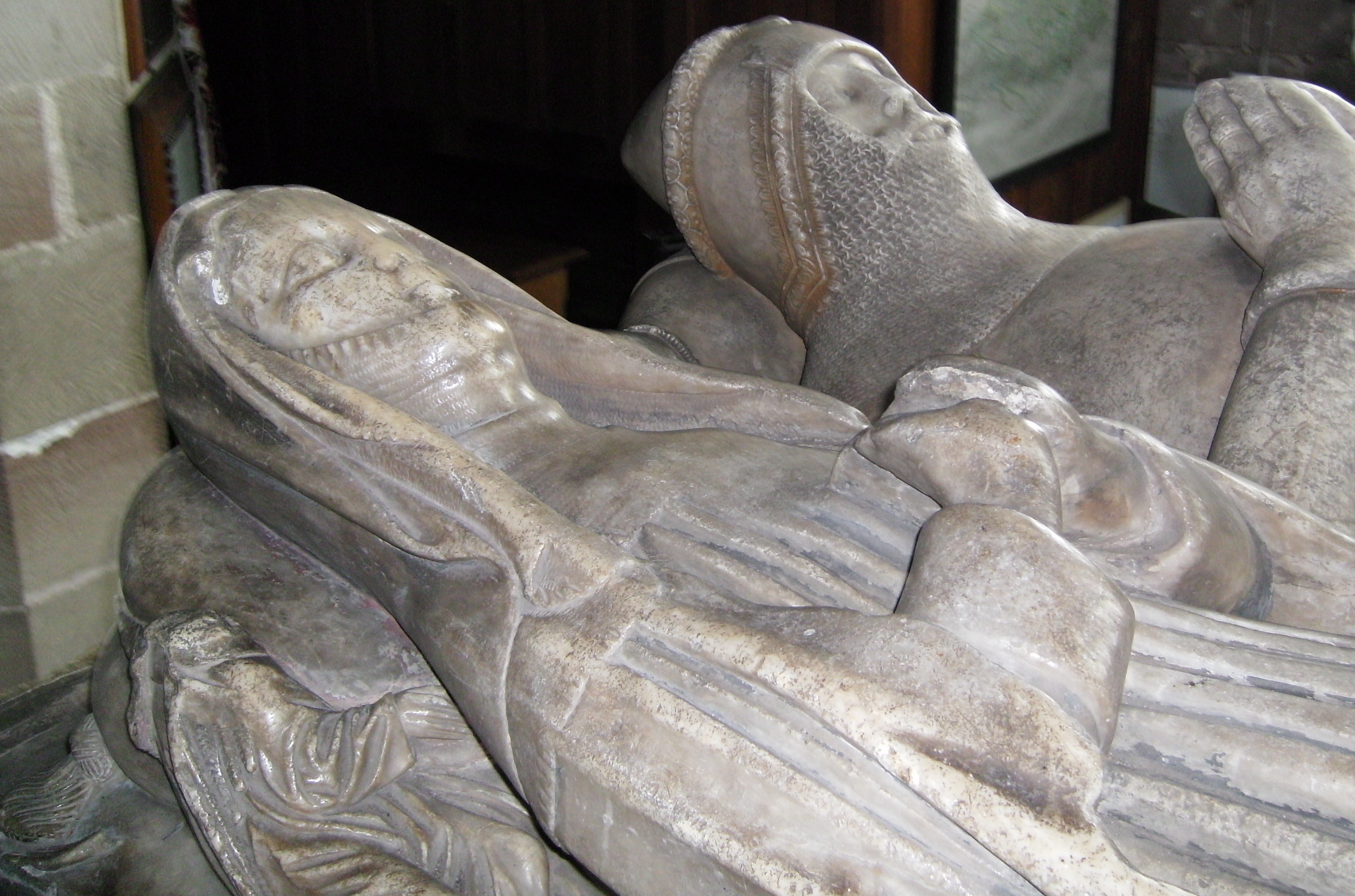
Isabel de Lingen, with her husband Fulk Pembrugge, on their tomb in St. Bartholomew's church, Tong, not far from Lapley in Shropshire. All Lapley's assets were transferred here in 1415.

== Dissolution and after ==
Henry V put an end to the priory in 1415. Already planning what was to become the Agincourt campaign, and strongly committed to presenting himself both as a distinctively English king and a defender and purifier of the Catholic faith, he determined to suppress all the alien houses in England. This measure was presented to the Fire and Faggot Parliament of 1414, alongside measures to suppress Lollardy. Henry reassured lay beneficiaries that this was to be final: there would be no restoration of the priories on conclusion of peace with France.

Lapley Priory was swiftly dissolved. On 15 June 1415 all its estates were granted to Tong College, "for a larger endowment of the same collegiate church." This was a pious foundation established about five years earlier by Isabel, widow of Sir Fulk Pembrugge (or Pembridge), who was granted a licence to buy the advowson of the church from Shrewsbury Abbey on 25 November 1410. The grant noted the allowances owed from the proceeds of the estates to the "king's mother" and to John Vale. The king's charter rehearsed the story of the priory since the reign of Edward III and noted that it was then leased to Bally and his partners, Knightley and Kanc. In 1417 John Bally, and all of his associates in farming the priory were pardoned any further debts or arrears in connection with it.

However, dissolution had not brought secularisation and Lapley's estates lingered on as a portfolio of property held by a successor institution. Tong College itself was not suppressed until the general dissolution of chantries and collegiate churches that began at the end of the reign of Henry VIII and continued under Edward VI. The advowson of the college had passed on Isabel of Lingen's death to her relative and son-in-law Sir Richard Vernon, and the Vernons had held it since that time. On 17 September 1546 a commission to take possession of Tong College, together with another college in Bakewell, was issued to Sir George Blount, George Vernon, Thomas Giffard and Francis Cave. Ten days later they signed the certificate to affirm that they had carried out their commission. Lapley manor, including the tithes and the estates of Bickford, Aston, and Edgeland, was leased to Henry and Eleanor Kirkham on 1 December 1546.

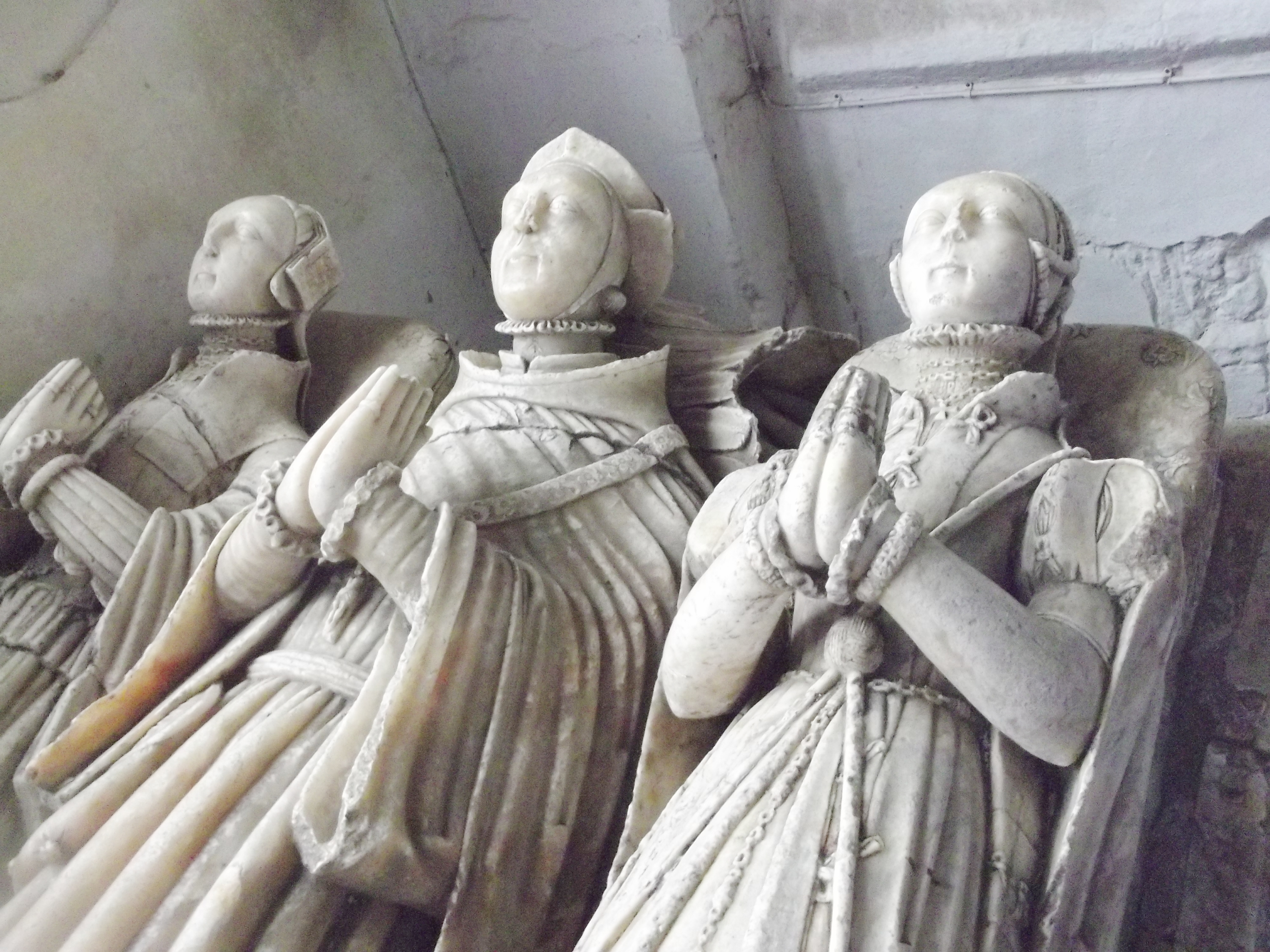
Effigies of Sir Robert Broke, purchaser of Lapley, and his two wives, Anne Waring and Dorothy Gatacre. All Saints' church, Claverley, Shropshire.

Vernon had a family interest in both the colleges he had helped seize but Tong had formed part of his mother's dower and a decision was made to sell it to her third husband, Sir Richard Manners for £486 8s. 2d. The grant went ahead after the accession of Edward VI on 25 July 1547. The Lapley estate of the former priory was specifically listed as part of the property conveyed to Manners and its sub-tenants were named as John Tarte, Edward Littleton, John Wyneshurst, John Parker and Henry Malpas. Silvington and Marston are also listed in the grant. The subtenants were listed again in May 1548 when a licence was granted to Manners to sell Lapley to Robert Broke, an important judge and London MP whose home was at nearby Claverley. It seems likely that the present Lapley Manor, built on the site of the old priory buildings, was the work of the Broke family, as it is dated to the late 16th century. The church, built of red and white sandstone ashlar had been provided with extra windows and a tower in the 15th century, probably by the college: it survived unchanged through the early modern period to be restored in the 19th century. Lapley remained part of the Broke's estates until the period after the English Civil War: diocesan records show that in 1667-8 Sir Theophilus Biddulph, 1st Baronet held the estate and the advowson of the church.

== List of priors ==
The list is based on that in the Victoria County History account of Lapley Priory and is inevitably incomplete.

- Godric, also rendered Godwin, appealed to Henry I over claims to Lapley made by the church at Penkridge. It is likely he was the prior at the time of the appeal.
- P. was prior at some during the abbacy of Peter Cellensis (1162–81) who refers to him, in unflattering terms, in a letter addressed to Ralph of Bedford, the prior of Worcester.
- Absalon was sent by Peter Cellensis as a replacement for Prior P.
- Inganus was the recipient of a further letter of Peter Cellensis, in which he is explicitly addressed as prior, so must have been presented by 1181. He is named as prior again in one of the Staffordshire Pipe Rolls of 1205–6, when he was struggling to pay a fine to recover control of the priory estates after King John's confiscation.
- John was presented by the abbot in 1233: this was noted in a mandate from Henry III to the sheriff.
- Walcher is mentioned in 1266.
- Reynold is mentioned in 1297.
- Peter de Passiaco resigned in 1305.
- John de Tannione was prior 1305–1320.
- Gobert of Brabant was prior 1320–1322.
- John de Aceyo was prior 1322 – circa 1328.
- Baldwin de Spynale was probably prior from 1328. He is last mentioned on 20 May 1357, when a demand for 40 marks, apparently sent in error, was cancelled by Edward III. It was probably he who had just died in office when a vacancy occurred in November 1361.
- Gobert de Lapion was excommunicated by Roger Northburgh's episcopal court as a rival prior in 1334 and was still contesting the position when he accepted the farm of the priory in September 1337.
- Peter de Gennereyo was instituted by Robert de Stretton in February 1362.
- Peter Romelot is first mentioned as prior in 1377 and was dead by 1399. He may be identical with Peter de Gennereyo.
- John Bally was presented by Henry IV on 4 November 1399 and was prior until the dissolution of Lapley Priory, when he was named as such in the grant handing it over to the collegiate church at Tong.
