= St John's Church, Stretton =

St John’s Church, Stretton
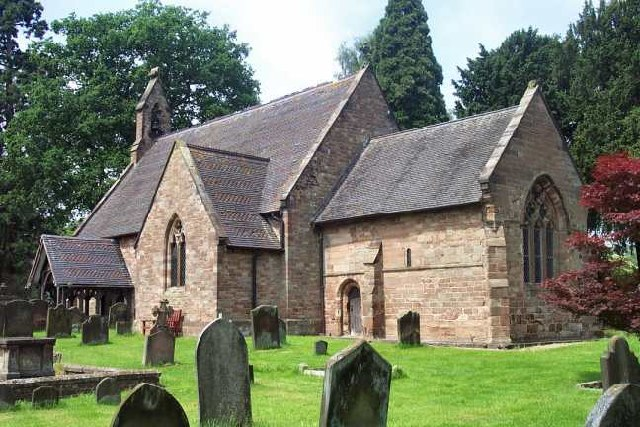
- St John’s Church, Stretton
- St John’s Church, Stretton
- 52°42′3.78″N 2°10′17.83″W
- OS grid reference: SJ 88674 11667
- Location: Stretton, South Staffordshire
- Country: England
- Denomination: Church of England

History
- Dedication: St. John

Architecture
- Heritage designation: Grade II* listed
- Architect: Edward Banks
- Completed: 1860

Administration
- Diocese: Diocese of Lichfield
- Archdeaconry: Lichfield
- Deanery: Penkridge
- Parish: Penkridge with Stretton

St John's Church, Stretton is the Church of England parish church of Stretton, South Staffordshire.

== History ==
The chancel is 12th century. The nave and transepts were rebuilt in 1860 to designs by the architect Edward Banks. The church is a Grade II* listed building.

== Team ministry ==
The parish is part of the Penkridge Team which includes the following churches:

- St James’ church, Acton Trussell
- All Saints’ church, Bednall
- St Lawrence's church, Coppenhall
- St Leonard's church, Dunston
- St Michael's church, Penkridge
- Levedale Mission, Penkridge
- St Modena's church, Pillaton

== See also ==
- Grade II* listed buildings in South Staffordshire
- Listed buildings in Lapley, Stretton and Wheaton Aston
