= Listed buildings in Coppenhall =

Coppenhall is a civil parish in the district of South Staffordshire, Staffordshire, England. It contains three listed buildings that are recorded in the National Heritage List for England. Of these, one is at Grade II*, the middle of the three grades, and the others are at Grade II, the lowest grade. The parish contains the village of Coppenhall and the surrounding countryside. The listed buildings consist of a church, a timber framed cottage, and a former windmill.

== Key ==
Grade	Criteria
II*	Particularly important buildings of more than special interest
II	Buildings of national importance and special interest

== Buildings ==
Name and location	Photograph	Date	Notes	Grade
St Lawrence's Church; 52.77221°N 2.13823°W		Early 13th century	The church was restored in about 1866. It is built in stone with a tile roof, and consists of a nave and a chancel, and is in Early English style with lancet windows. At the west end is a weatherboarded bellcote with a shingled roof.	II*
Doxey Wood Cottage; 52.77982°N 2.14944°W	—	Early 18th century	The cottage is timber framed and partly rebuilt in brick painted to resemble timber framing, and it has a corrugated iron roof. There is one storey and an attic, one bay, and a single-storey extension to the left. On the front is a doorway, a casement window, and a small window.	II
Windmill Tower; 52.76942°N 2.15282°W		18th century (probable)	The former windmill, to the northwest of Butterhill farmhouse, is in red brick with some repairs in engineering brick and timber, and it has a corrugated iron roof. The building is circular and tapering, with three storeys, and it contains windows and a doorway, all with segmental heads.	II
