= Mottey Meadows =

National nature reserve in England

- Site of Special Scientific Interest
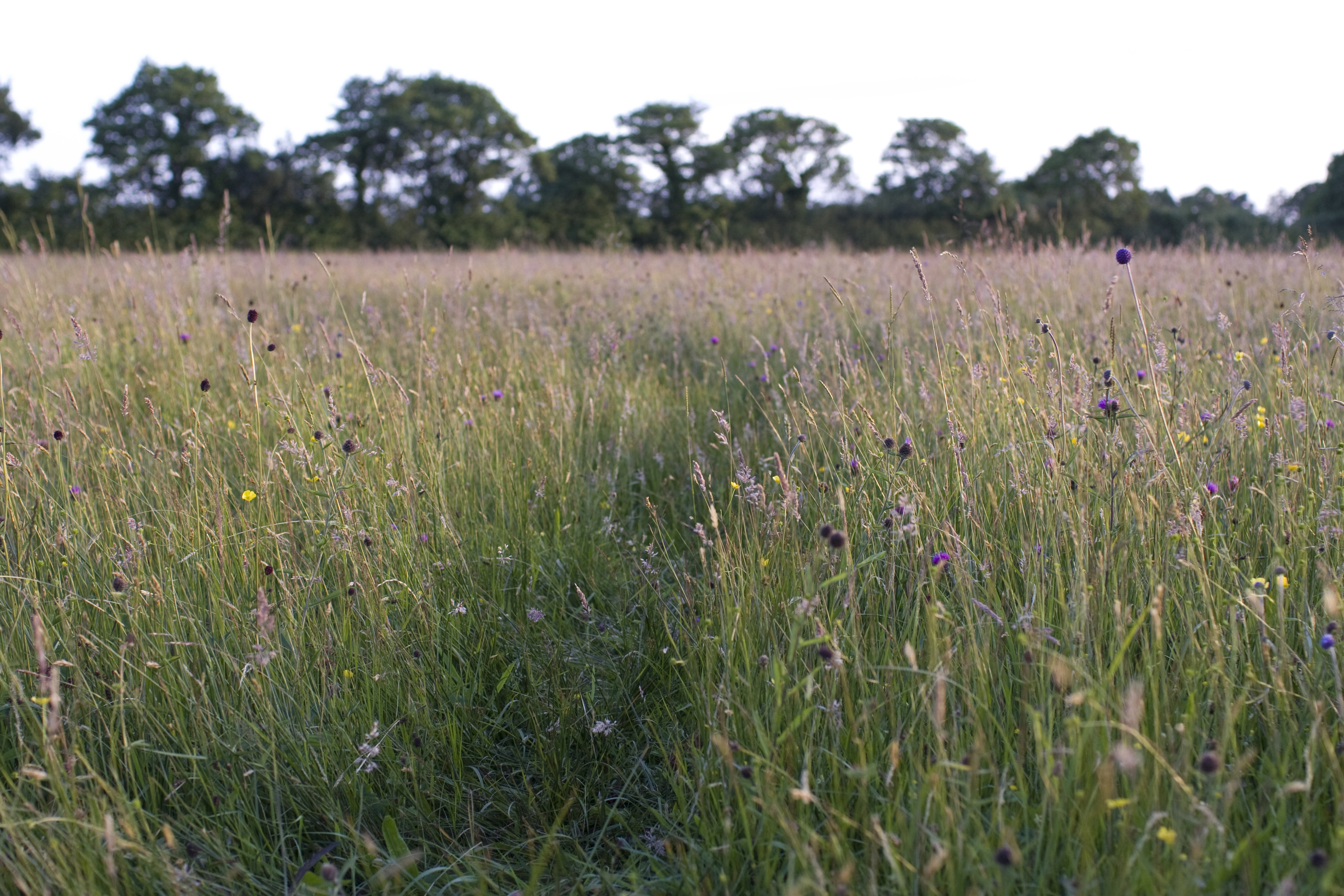
- Mottey Meadows in late summer

- Location within Staffordshire
- Location of Mottey Meadows.
- Area of search: Staffordshire
- Grid reference: SJ839132
- Coordinates: 52.717°N 2.234°W
- Interest: Biological
- Area: 44.6 acres (0.180 km^{2}; 0.0697 sq mi)
- Notification date: 1986
- Location map: magic.defra.gov.uk www.openstreetmap.org

Mottey Meadows National Nature Reserve (NNR) consists of a series of alluvial flood meadows near the village of Wheaton Aston in Staffordshire, England. The meadows have been managed for hay making for many centuries. They support over 240 species of flowering plants, including the rare snake's-head fritillary.

The site is an outstanding floristically-diverse mesotrophic grassland where traditional late hay cutting and aftermath grazing has been perpetuated, largely unaffected by modern agricultural practices.

The site is important because of its large size, variety of grassland community types and presence of rare species. Further more it contains an extensive example of an alluvial flood meadow.

Examples of grassland types found on the site include MG4 and MG8. The meadows are rich with a variety of orchids during the late spring and summer.

The site is designated a Site of Special Scientific Interest (SSSI) and a European Special Area of Conservation (SAC) and is carefully managed by Natural England with support from the Friends of Mottey Meadows and the Floodplain Meadows Partnership.

Full details of the site designations can be found on the Natural England register of Designated Sites.
