= Charles Congreve =

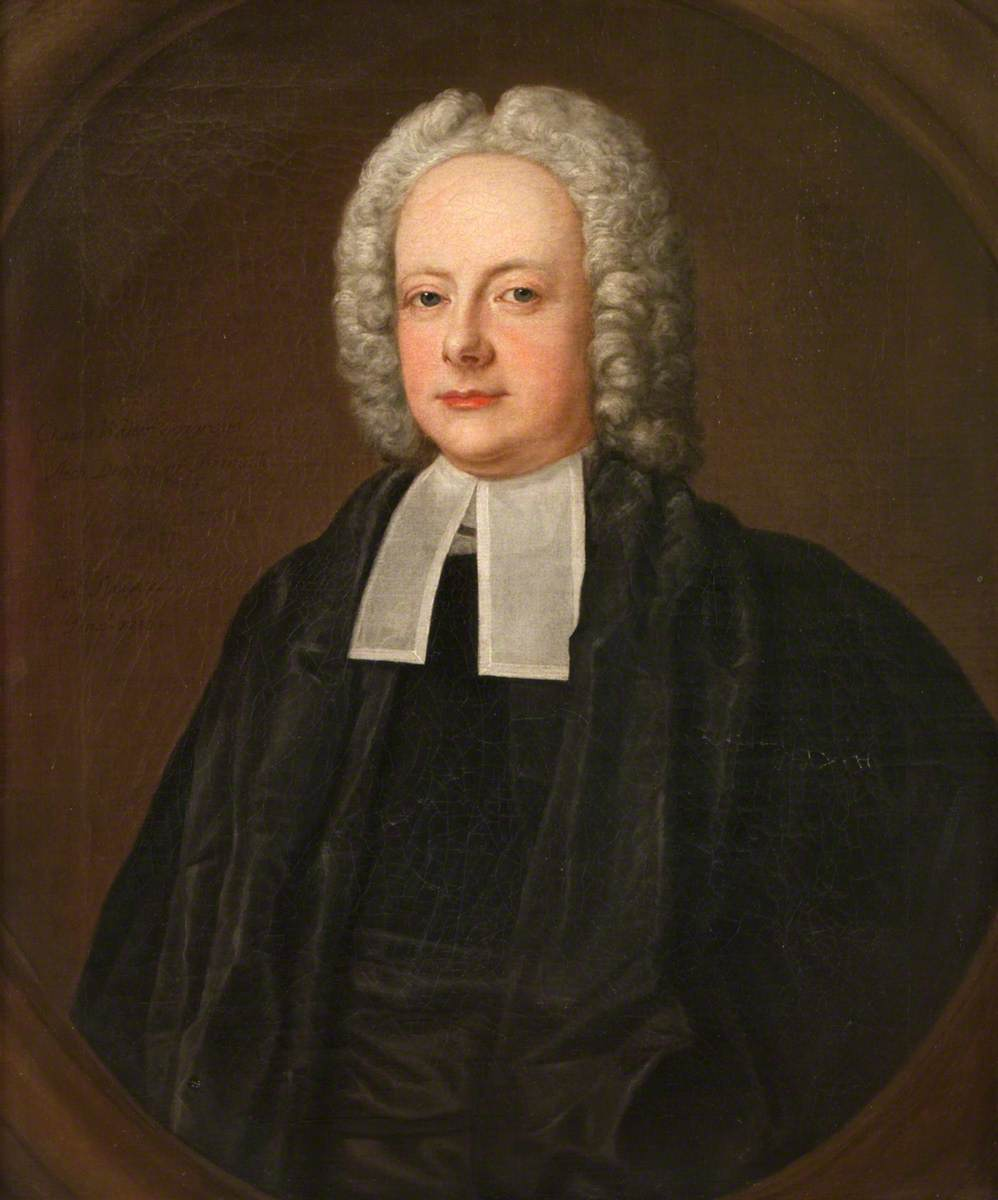
Charles Walter Congreve

Charles Walter Congreve was Archdeacon of Armagh from 1738 until his death in 1777.

Congreve was born at Stretton, South Staffordshire and educated at Magdalen College, Oxford. He was Vicar general of the diocese from 1746. In 1746 he published An absolute, indefeasible, hereditary right contrary to reason and Scripture, on 1 Chron 5:1–5:2. He was buried in Westminster Abbey.
