= Ælfgar, Earl of Mercia =

Earl of Mercia and Earl of East Anglia (died 1062)

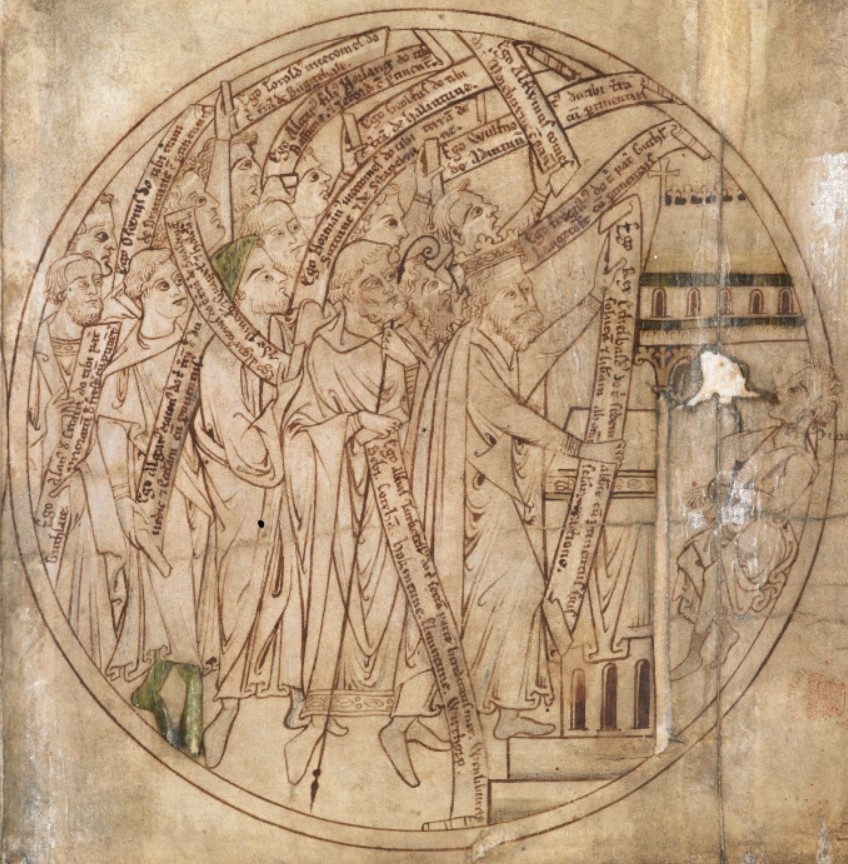
Roundel from the Guthlac Roll depicting various benefactors to St Guthlac's shrine, including King Æthelbald of Mercia, Abbot Thurketel and Earl Ælfgar.

Ælfgar (died c. 1062) was the son of Leofric, Earl of Mercia, by his famous wife Godgifu (Lady Godiva). He succeeded to his father's title, Earl of Mercia, and responsibilities on the latter's death in 1057. He gained the additional title of Earl of East Anglia, but also was exiled for a time. Through the first marriage of his daughter he became father-in-law to Welsh king Gruffydd ap Llywelyn. A few years after Ælfgar's death, his daughter became a widow and married Harold Godwinson, the last king of Anglo-Saxon England.

== War and exile ==
Ælfgar profited from the exile of Earl Godwin of Wessex and his sons in 1051. He was given the Earldom of East Anglia, which had been that of Harold, son of Godwin. Earl Godwin and King Edward were reconciled the following year, so Harold was restored to his earldom—but not for long. At Easter 1053 Godwin died, so Harold became Earl of Wessex, and the earldom of East Anglia returned to Ælfgar.

Ælfgar seems to have learned from the tactics Godwin used to put pressure on King Edward. When Ælfgar was exiled in 1055, he raised a fleet of 18 ships in Ireland and then turned to Wales, where King Gruffydd agreed to join forces with him against King Edward. Two miles from Hereford, on 24 October, they clashed with the army of the Earl of Herefordshire, Ralph the Timid. The Earl and his men eventually took flight, and Gruffydd and Ælfgar pursued them, killing and wounding as they went, and enacting savage reprisals on Hereford. They despoiled and burnt the town, killing many of its citizens. King Edward ordered an army mustered and put Earl Harold in charge of it. This was more formidable opposition, and Ælfgar and Gruffydd fled to south Wales. However, the issue was resolved by diplomacy and Earl Ælfgar was reinstated.

== Family ==
Ælfgar is believed to have married Ælgifu, believed to be the sister of William Malet, Lord of Eye, as well as a possible relative of Ælgifu of Northampton, King Canute's first wife. He is known to have had at least four children, although their birth dates are unknown. They are, in no particular order:

- Burgheard (d. 1061), predeceased his father.
- Edwin (d. 1071), later earl of Mercia.
- Morcar (d. after 1087), later earl of Northumbria.
- Ealdgyth, queen consort of Wales and later of England, wife of Gruffydd ap Llywelyn and Harold II – her first and second husbands, respectively.

Ælfgar's son Burgheard predeceased his father, expiring while returning from Rome early in 1061, and was buried at Reims. This led Ælfgar to give to Reims Abbey lands in Staffordshire and Shropshire, which became the endowment for Lapley Priory. He was survived by three other children.

== Death ==
Ælfgar is believed to have died around 1062, well before the Battle of Hastings. He is reputedly buried in the churchyard at Algarkirk (reputedly named after him) in Lincolnshire. His daughter's children, of the defeated King Harold, are believed to have lived in exile.

== Notes ==
Peerage of England
| Preceded by Leofric | Earl of Mercia; 1057–1062 | Succeeded by Edwin |
| Preceded by Harold Godwinson | Earl of East Anglia; 1053–1057 | Succeeded by Gyrth Godwinson |
