= Stretton Hall, Staffordshire =

Coordinates: 52.7030°N 2.1685°W

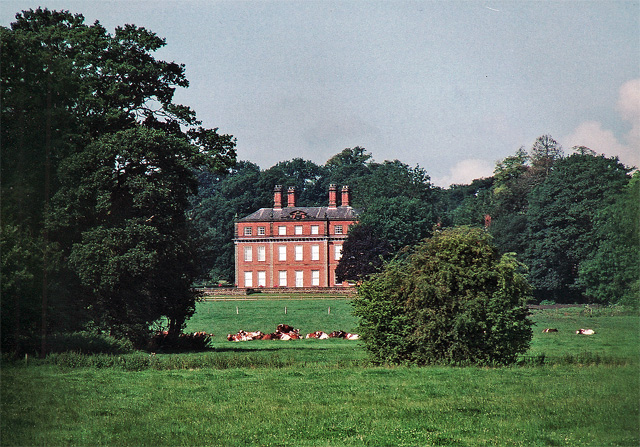
Stretton Hall

Stretton Hall is an early 18th-century mansion house at Stretton, South Staffordshire. It is the home of a branch of the Monckton family descended from John Monckton 1st Viscount Galway. It is a privately owned Grade II* listed building, not open to the public.

The house built by John Congreve in about 1700 was originally two-storeyed with dormers above, a three-bay pedimented central block and two-bayed wings with a central pedimented entrance door.

General Henry Monckton (1780–1854), a son of Edward Monckton and Sophia Pigot of Somerford Hall, purchased the estate in about 1845. He died in 1854, passing the estate on to his son, Francis Monckton. Four years later, Francis inherited Somerford, which had passed through the hands of two childless uncles, Edward and George. The Somerford inheritance included Coven and Engleton, two large neighbouring estates. Francis already resided at Stretton and moved the family seat there permanently, renting out Somerford Hall. In the 1860s he carried out extensive alterations at Stretton including a third storey and a new entrance front.

Several members of the family have served as High Sheriff of Staffordshire, the latest being Mrs Joanna Bird Monckton in 1995.
