= Stretton, South Staffordshire =

Village in Staffordshire, England

Coordinates: 52.7°N 2.17°W

Stretton
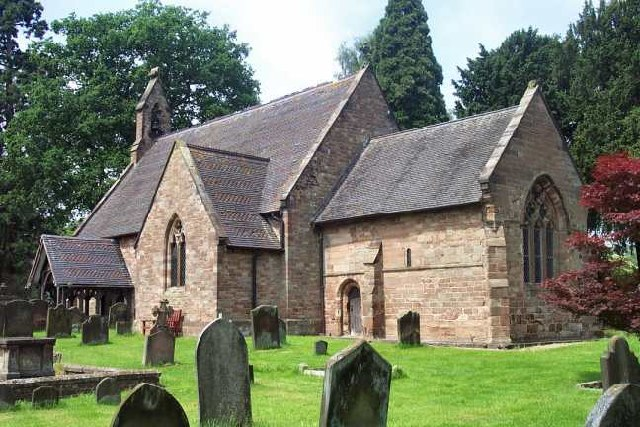
- St John's parish church

- Location within Staffordshire
- Civil parish: Lapley, Stretton and Wheaton Aston
- District: South Staffordshire
- Shire county: Staffordshire
- Region: West Midlands
- Country: England
- Sovereign state: United Kingdom

Stretton is a village and former civil parish, now in the parish of Lapley, Stretton and Wheaton Aston, in the South Staffordshire district, in the county of Staffordshire, England. It is just north of the A5 road. In 1961 the parish had a population of 176.

The A5 is Watling Street, a notable Roman road, and another Roman road passes through Stretton from Mediolanum (Whitchurch), forming a junction with Watling Street near the bridge over the River Penk. On the other side of the river was the now-deserted Roman settlement of Pennocrucium. The village's position on the road from Mediolanum gives it its name, the Old English for "street town" ("street" meaning a paved or Roman road). Stretton Bridge today carries Watling Street over the Penk.

Stretton Hall is in the village.

The Church of England parish church of St John's Church, Stretton has a 12th-century chancel.

The Shropshire Union Canal passes to the west of the village, and there is a Stretton Wharf. The Stretton Aqueduct carries the canal over the A5 road.

Vernon Lodge Preparatory School was a small coeducational non-selective private school in Stretton for children aged 2 to 11. It was founded in 1981 and closed in March 2015.

== History ==
Stretton was formerly a chapelry in the parish of Penkridge, from 1866 Stretton was a civil parish in its own right, on 1 April 1986 the parish was abolished and merged with Lapley to form "Lapley and Stretton", part also went to Penkridge.

== Notable people ==
- Charles Congreve was Archdeacon of Armagh from 1738 until his death in 1777. He was born at Stretton, South Staffordshire and educated at Magdalen College, Oxford.

== See also ==
- Listed buildings in Lapley, Stretton and Wheaton Aston
