= Lapley, Stretton and Wheaton Aston =

Civil parish in Staffordshire, England

Coordinates: 52.71°N 2.2°W

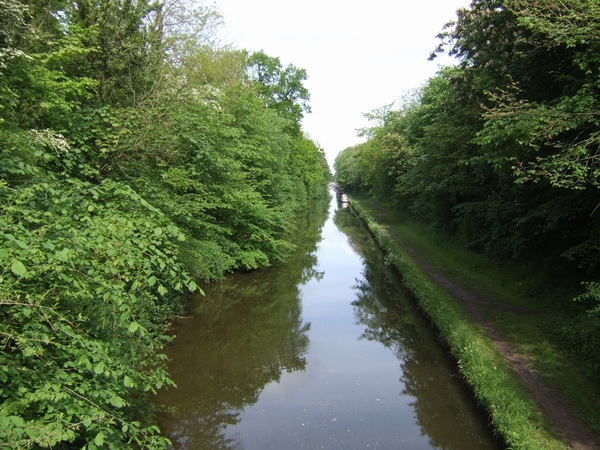
- Heading North on the Shropshire Union Canal

- Location within Staffordshire
- Population: 2,548 (2011 census)
- Civil parish: Lapley, Stretton and Wheaton Aston
- District: South Staffordshire
- Shire county: Staffordshire
- Region: West Midlands
- Country: England
- Sovereign state: United Kingdom
- UK Parliament: Stone, Great Wyrley and Penkridge

Lapley, Stretton and Wheaton Aston is a civil parish in the South Staffordshire district, in the county of Staffordshire, England. The population of the civil parish at the 2011 census was 2,548.

It contains, and is named for, the three villages of Lapley, Stretton and Wheaton Aston (which is by far the largest settlement). The area is rural, with the Shropshire Union Canal passing through, and the A5 road ("Watling Street") forms the parish's southern border.

== History ==
The parish was formed on 1 April 1986 as "Lapley and Stretton" from "Lapley" and "Stretton" and part of Penkridge. On 5 November 1990 it was renamed "Lapley, Stretton & Wheaton Aston".

== See also ==
- Listed buildings in Lapley, Stretton and Wheaton Aston
