= Somerford Hall =

Coordinates: 52°40′17″N 2°8′53″W

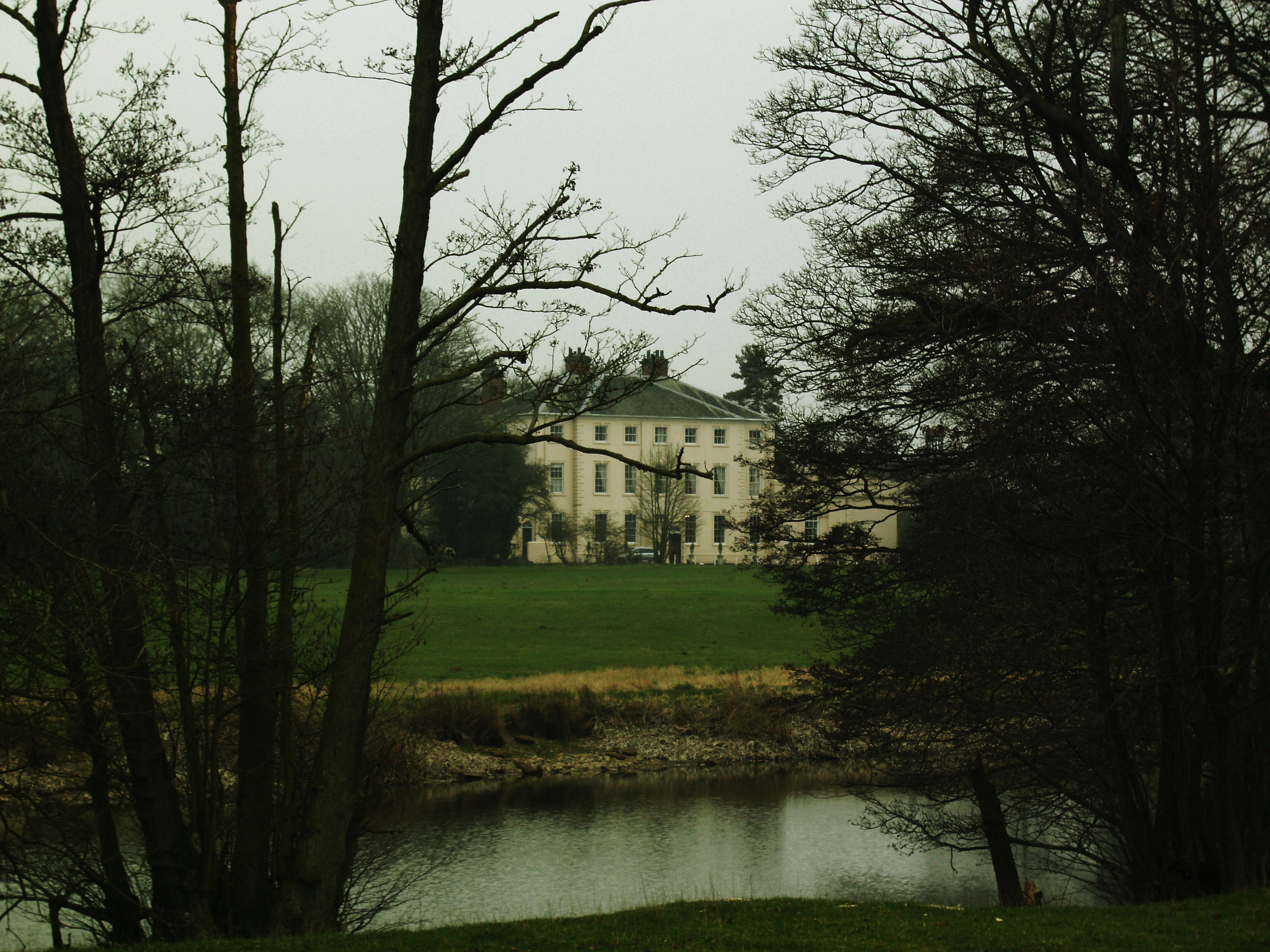
Somerford Hall.

Somerford Hall is an 18th-century Palladian style mansion house at Brewood, Staffordshire. It is a Grade II* listed building.

Somerford is a name of Old English origin and the interpretation is obvious: "summer river-crossing". This probably means that the River Penk near this point was only fordable in the summer. The manor of Somerford was held from the 1120s, when Henry I granted land there to Richard de Somerford, until 1705 by the Somerford family, named after their place of residence.

The old house, estate and attached manors were owned from 1696 by Sir Walter Wrottesley, 3rd Baronet (died 1712), who had bought the mortgages of John Somerford, after which all properties passed to Wrottesley's second wife Dame Anne who died in 1732. In 1734 the house was sold in trust by Dame Anne's brother Thomas, her daughter Anne, and Peter Meyrick of the Bank of England, to the lawyer Robert Barbor of the Inner Temple for £5400.

Barbor replaced the old manor house with the present mansion. The central seven-bayed three-storey block is flanked by single-storey pavilions with pedimented gables and ball finials. In 1744 Barbor bought the neighbouring Coven estate, uniting it with the manor of Somerford. However, his successors seem to have got into financial difficulties and several times came close to losing the hall to creditors before finally deciding to sell it.

The estate was purchased in 1779 by Hon Edward Monckton, (a younger son of Viscount Galway and half brother of General Robert Monckton), a nabob who had made his fortune in India. Monckton carried out alterations to the house including the provision of an entrance porch and application of stucco, making the frontage a startling white. The dining room was rebuilt to a design and by Robert Adam, with an impressive fireplace. Monckton also brought water from the River Penk to a rooftop reservoir and installed a system which allowed waste and surplus water to be used on the plants and vegetables in the garden. The grounds were laid out by Humphrey Repton. Monckton went on to purchase Engleton Hall, also on the Penk, to the north, and its estate, in two stages, as well as leasing the deanery estate in Brewood.

In 1832, on Monckton's death, the hall and estates passed to his eldest son, also Edward, who died unmarried and without issue in 1848. The estates, therefore, passed to his younger brother George. Meanwhile, a still younger brother, General Henry Monckton (1780–1854) purchased Stretton Hall, a substantial house a short distance north, and its estate in about 1845. Henry died in 1854 and George four years later. Francis Monckton, Henry's son, thus inherited both estates in rapid succession. He promptly moved the family seat permanently from Somerford to Stretton, renting out Somerford Hall.

In about 1945 the property was converted to residential flats. During the 1970s and 1980s the house was again a single large residence with the ground floor housing a sports therapy and physiotherapy clinic. The reconversion was because of a number of apartment fires; the fire service insisting that, to remain as apartments, an exterior fire escape had to be built. This was refused because of the listed building status. During the late 1980s the owners of the clinic relocated to smaller premises and the house was converted to a conference and wedding venue.

== See also ==
- Grade II* listed buildings in South Staffordshire
- Listed buildings in Brewood and Coven
