= Coppenhall =

Village in Staffordshire, England

Coordinates: 52.76°N 02.14°W

- Location within Staffordshire
- Population: 294 (2011)
- OS grid reference: SJ9019
- Shire county: Staffordshire
- Region: West Midlands
- Country: England
- Sovereign state: United Kingdom
- Post town: Stafford
- Postcode district: ST18
- Police: Staffordshire
- Fire: Staffordshire
- Ambulance: West Midlands
- UK Parliament: Stone, Great Wyrley and Penkridge

Coppenhall is a small settlement in Staffordshire, England. Coppenhall lies 2 kilometres (1 mi) southwest of Stafford and 4 miles (6.4 km) NNW of Penkridge with Baron Stafford as lord of the manor. The parish of ~900 acres (3.6 km^{2}) is bounded on the east by the Pothooks Brook. The centre of the village lies at 416 ft (127 m) above sea level, the ground rising from about 275 ft (84 m) in the east of the parish to over 475 ft (145 m) in the west.

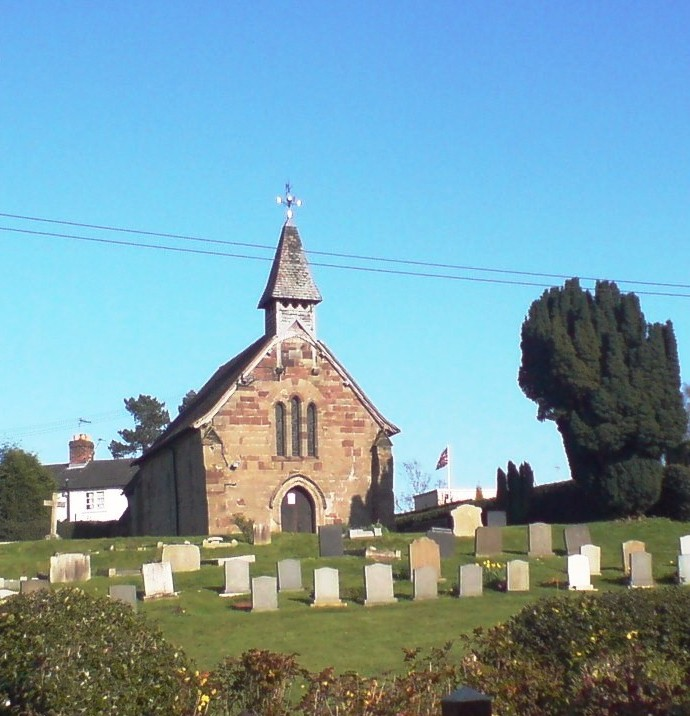
Coppenhall Church, April 2008

== Church of St Lawrence ==
The small ancient church of St. Lawrence, built c.1200, and described by Pevsner as "a perfect 13th century village church, small but of great dignity," is constructed of thick sandstone walls with a spired wooden bellcote, and has capacity for only about 60 worshippers. It was made a chapelry of Penkridge parish after the Poor Law Amendment Act 1834. The church registers commence in 1678 and are deposited at Staffordshire Record Office.

A church existed at Coppenhall by 1200, it being a dependency of Penkridge College by 1261, having also had a vicarage ordained by 1291.

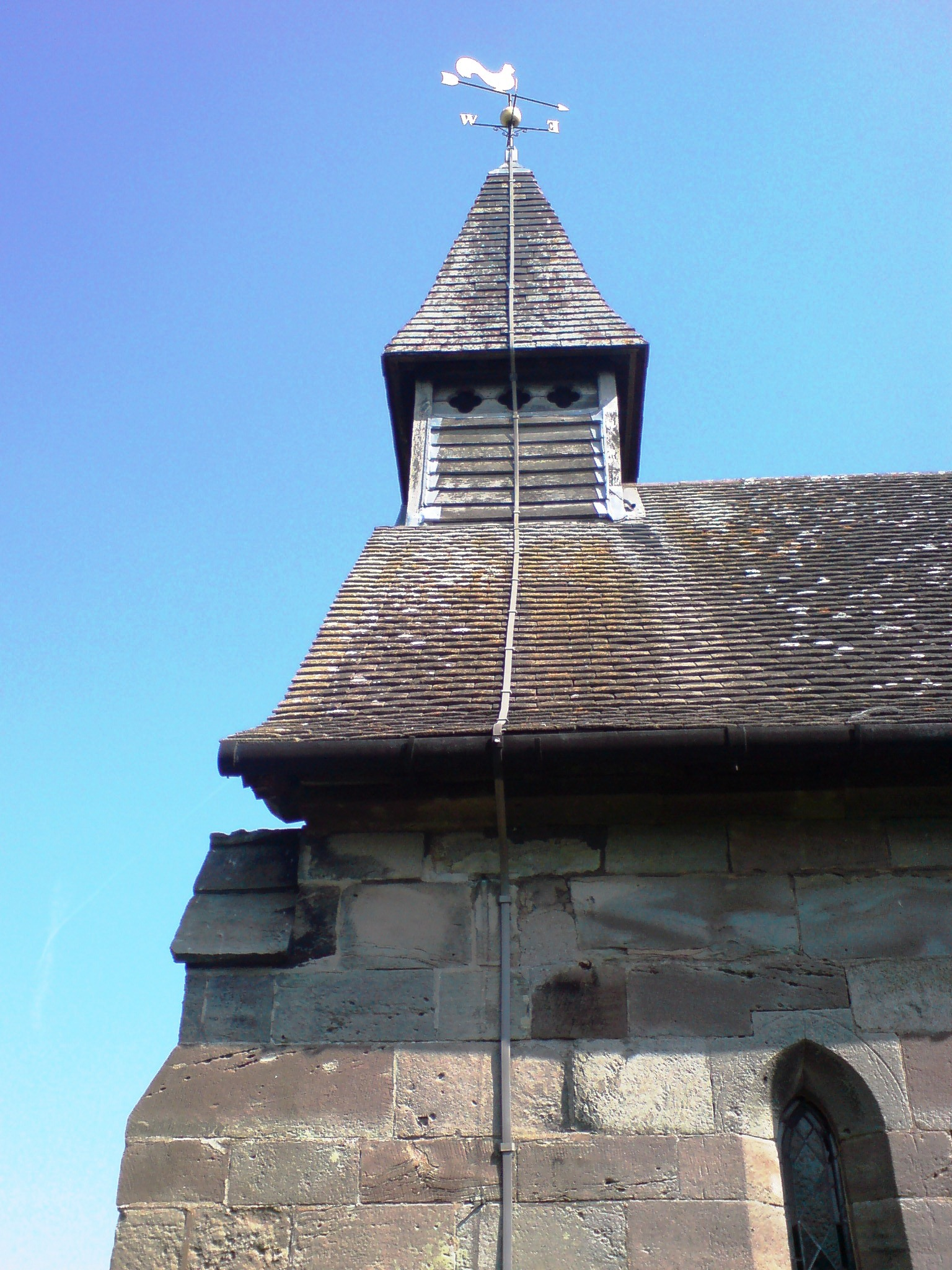
The spired bell tower and cockerel wind vane of Coppenhall church, May 2008

The church was extensively restored in 1866, which involved fitting a new roof, repairs to the windows and gable-ends and the addition of a new circular window to the east gable. A new bell turret was also added with a taller spire, and a stone pulpit and circular font were installed at this time. In 1917, a memorial pulpit and lectern were bequeathed in memory of Charles Mort by his widow Helen. In 1932, an oak lych-gate was added in memory of Charles H and Lillie Wright.

== Butterhill ==
Close to Coppenhall is the tiny hamlet of Butterhill, which possesses a semi-derelict red-brick windmill standing on a small hill. The windmill has been a Grade II listed building since 1986. This windmill "standing on high ground some 150 yards west of Butterhill Farm and locally said to have been the only six-sail mill in the county, was in use by 1820. About 1849 it was part of Lord Hatherton's estate in Coppenhall occupied by William Handy. It seems to have gone out of use between 1872 and 1876, but the tackle was not removed until 1912. The derelict brick tower probably dates from c.1800."

Also nearby stands Butterhill House, a 3-storey Georgian house with a large south-facing glasshouse or Orangery. Butterhill House was owned by the Marson family in the 19th century and then passed to the Busby family who still lived there in 1900. Mrs. A. J. Busby was one of the chief landowners in Coppenhall in 1912 and 1916, but between at least 1924 and 1932 Butterhill House was owned and occupied by T. P. Darlington. Miss Darlington was living there in 1940. The house was sold in 1955 to Mr. A. N. Hillier, who had converted it by 1956 into flats. It is a mid-19th-century brick building with gabled dormers, ornamental barge-boards, and stone bay windows. It also has a large walled garden to the north. The house has for some years now been a residential care home for the elderly.

== Notable people ==
- Bridget Bostock (born c. 1678, died after 1749), faith healer

== See also ==
- Listed buildings in Coppenhall
