= Wheaton Aston =

Village in Staffordshire, England

Coordinates: 52.711°N 2.221°W

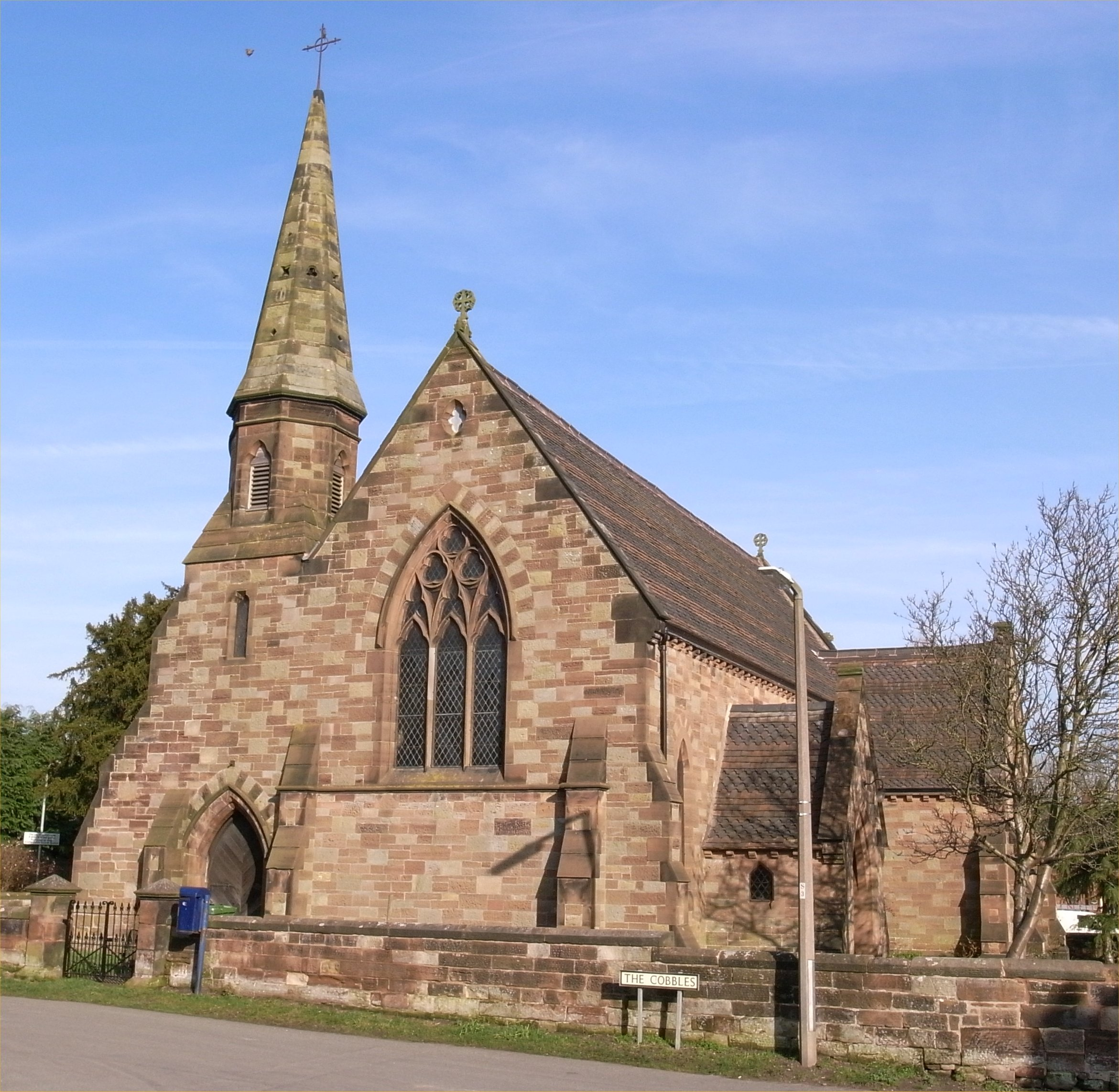
- St Mary's church

- Location within Staffordshire
- OS grid reference: SJ851126
- Civil parish: Lapley, Stretton and Wheaton Aston
- District: South Staffordshire
- Shire county: Staffordshire
- Region: West Midlands
- Country: England
- Sovereign state: United Kingdom
- Post town: Stafford
- Postcode district: ST19
- Police: Staffordshire
- Fire: Staffordshire
- Ambulance: West Midlands
- UK Parliament: Stone, Great Wyrley and Penkridge

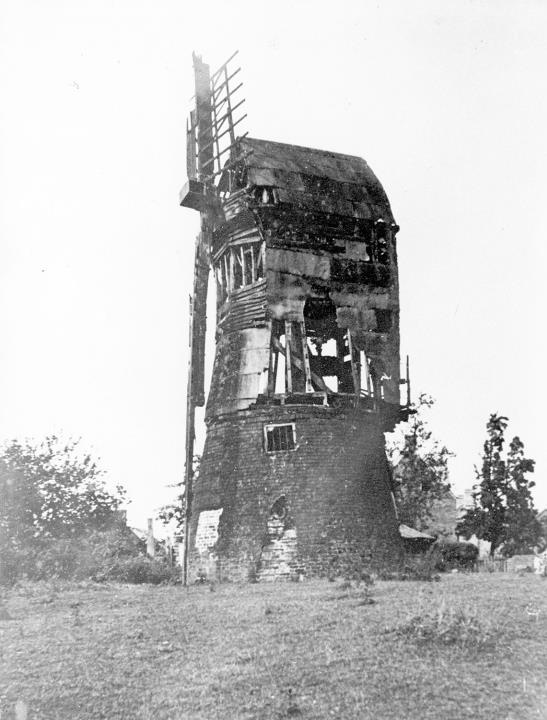
A picture of the old mill

Wheaton Aston is a small village in Staffordshire, England about 9 miles (14 km) south west of Stafford and 7 miles (11 km) west of Cannock. It is located beside Bridge 19 of the Shropshire Union Canal. The civil parish is called Lapley, Stretton and Wheaton Aston.

It has a population of several thousand, according to the latest British Survey. It has good transport links making it an ideal commuter village to the large cities of the Midlands. Junction 12 of the M6 motorway is only 5 miles (8.0 km) away, providing quick access to Birmingham, Walsall and Wolverhampton, while close proximity to the M54, A449 and A5 provides easy access to Stafford, Cannock, Telford and Shrewsbury.

Select Bus 17 runs to Wolverhampton Mon-Fri while their service 877 connects the village to Stafford Mon-Sat. Due to low use service 17 will be withdrawn from 12th April 2026.

== History ==
The first known reference to Wheaton Aston is in the Domesday Book where the parish of Lapley is mentioned and includes other local settlements.

Up to the 18th century, Wheaton Aston was regarded as something of a spa due to the existence of a mineral spring in one of the gardens.

In 1777, the first major event in the village happened when a fire burnt down over half of the village. This is known locally as the 'Great Fire'.

In the 1830s, Thomas Telford built the Birmingham and Liverpool Junction canal (now known as the Shropshire Union Canal) through the edge of the village, bringing a lot of people and trade into the village. This was due to the canal being the main through route between Liverpool and London.

There are a pair of moles feet from 1902 on display in the Pitt Rivers Museum in Oxford that were carried in the pocket of an old man from Wheaton Aston as a cure against toothache.

During World War II, the village had an operational airfield roughly 2 miles (3.2 km) north of the village, which is now used as farm land, however the buildings (control tower etc.) are still present but derelict.

The last large event to occur in the village was the introduction of the sewers into the village in the 1960s and 1970s which allowed the village to grow in size very quickly, and resulted in many new housing estates.

== Snake's head fritillary ==
One of the village's claims to fame is that it is the most northerly point in the UK where the snake's head fritillary can be found growing in the wild. Locally the flower is known by the name "folfallarum". In years gone by it used to be tradition that on the first Sunday on May, the villagers would all go out and pick the flowers. This tradition is what caused the flower to become the village's unofficial emblem, used on things like the local school uniforms.

Nowadays the area where the flower grows, known as Mottey Meadows, is run by Natural England, to protect the flower.

== Amenities ==
Although in the heart of the South Staffordshire countryside there are many amenities for the local population including two pubs, The Hartley Arms and the Coach and Horses (which also provides accommodation for a cafe/sandwich shop), Wheaton Aston and Lapley Recreation Ground, post office, paper shop, general store, a garage-cum-chandlery-cum-hardware shop (Turners), a motor engineers (Hinsley's) and a couple of farms (The Bridge and Whitegates) who also sell their produce direct to the public. The old scout hut alongside the canal has undergone refurbishment and has re-opened in June 2021 as Tavern Lane Studio, a community arts hub offering dance, drama and several other clubs.

There is one school in the village, St. Mary's CE(C) First School, which has a total intake of roughly 100 children.

== Churches ==
There is currently one church and one chapel in the village.

There has been a church on the current site in the centre of the village since the 14th century. This original wooden church was one of the few buildings to survive the Great Fire in 1777. However, due to disrepair, this church was demolished and a new stone church was built in 1857. This was then extended in 1894, and is the church still currently standing. All of the windows were made in a medieval style by the renowned Victorian master of stained glass, Charles Eamer Kempe.

The Zion Chapel was built in 1814 and was established as a 'Congregational church'. However, when the Congregational and Presbyterian churches combined they decided to join the Evangelical Fellowship of Congregational Churches (E.F.C.C.), so that they could remain independent and self supporting but have the affiliation and support of a worldwide body of Churches.

== Notable people ==
- Edgar Leopold Layard CMG FZS MBOU, (1824 – 1900) was a British diplomat and a naturalist mainly interested in ornithology and to a lesser extent the molluscs. He worked for a significant part of his life in Ceylon and later in South Africa, Fiji and New Caledonia. He lived in the village as a boy.
- Jeremy Weate (born 1969 in Wheaton Aston) PhD in European philosophy from Warwick in 1998, author of the children's book A Young Person's Guide to Philosophy, an international development consultant, focusing on transparency and good governance in the extractive industries in Africa, now runs an ibogaine-assisted retreat centre in Portugal.
- Epic45 (active since 1995) a British indie/post-rock band whose core members Rob Glover and Benjamin Holton grew up in Wheaton Aston.

== Twin towns and sister cities ==
In February 1990, Wheaton Aston became twinned with Wheaton, Illinois, United States.

== See also ==
- Listed buildings in Lapley, Stretton and Wheaton Aston
