= Water Eaton =

Water Eaton may refer to the following places in England:

- Water Eaton, Milton Keynes in Buckinghamshire
- Water Eaton, Oxfordshire
- Water Eaton, Staffordshire (Roman:PENNOCRVCIVM)
