= Levedale =

Village in Staffordshire, England

Coordinates: 52.745°N 2.150°W

Levedale is a small somewhat elongated English village situated some 4 miles southwest of Stafford, 2 miles northwest of Penkridge and a mile west of Dunston, Staffordshire. The population as taken at the 2011 census can be found under Penkridge

It forms part of a group of hamlets and villages lying in a rectangular area of farmland lying to the southwest of Stafford and the east of Telford, between the A518 to the north, the A449 to the east, Watling Street to the south, and the A41 to the west. This area contains the large villages of Weston-under-Lizard, Wheaton Aston and Penkridge in the southern half and Gnosall and Church Eaton in the northern half. It also contains many small villages and hamlets, including Mitton, Coppenhall, Whiston, Lapley, High Onn, Blymhill, Dunston, Bradley, Levedale, Stretton, Moreton, Orslow, etc.

Levedale village consists of cottages, houses and a few farms scattered along several roads that run between Coppenhall and Penkridge.

== Levedale Church ==
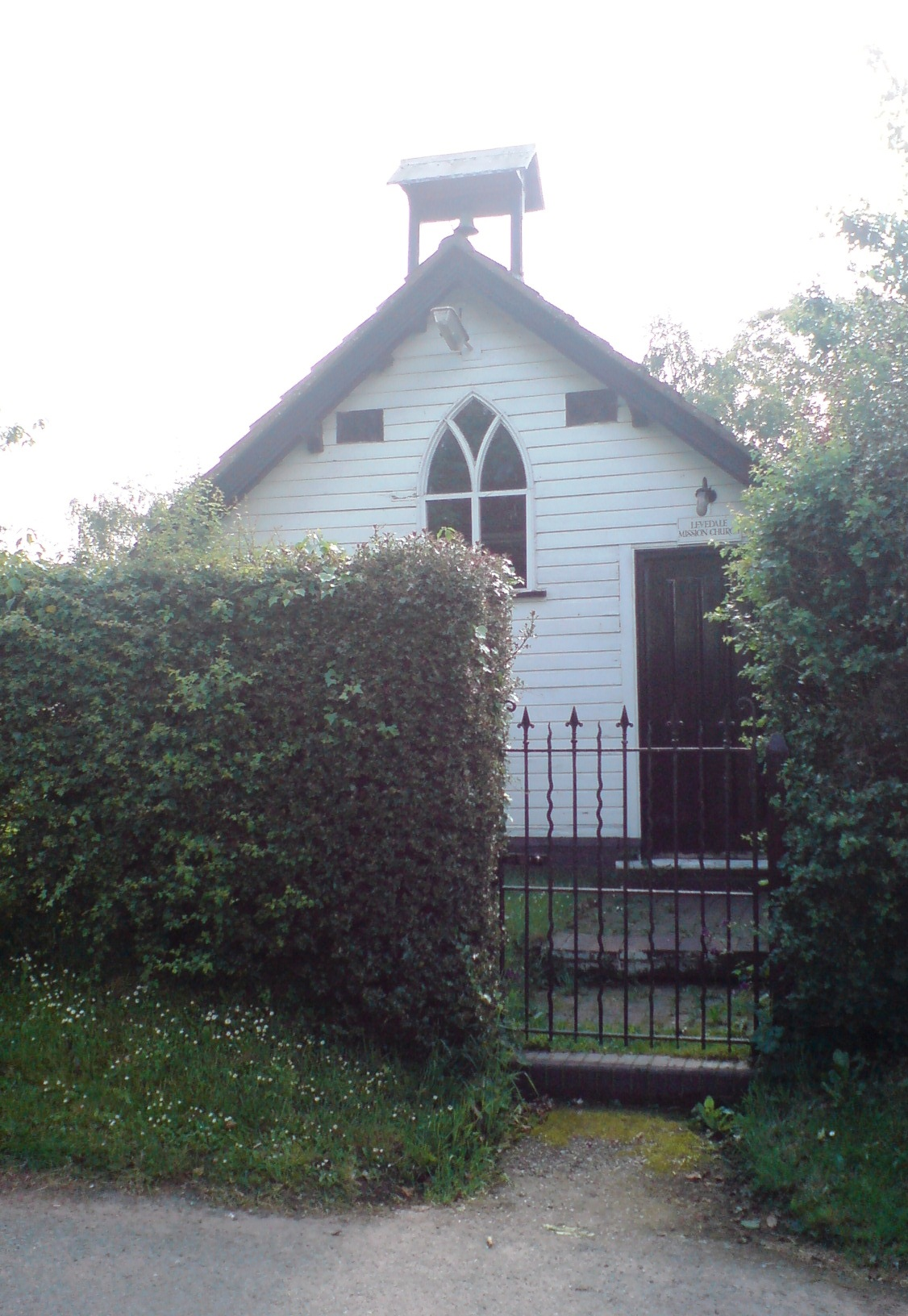
Levedale Mission Church, May 2008

In ancient times, there was a chapel of ease at Levedale dedicated to St Laurence but it had reportedly fallen into disuse by 1563

Today there is a small Anglican Mission church dating from the last half of the 19th century. In the 19th century missions were established at Whiston (1880) and Levedale (c. 1881) and in the former oratory chapel at Pillaton Hall (1888). The mission church at Whiston is of red brick and consists of nave, small chancel, and south porch. It has pointed windows and a bell-cote above the west gable. The mission church at Levedale stands on the east side of the road and is a small weather-boarded building with leaded windows. In 1956 the plate included a silver chalice and silver paten, formerly the property of the late Revd. J. H. Kenysson, Vicar of Penkridge, who presented them to Levedale church.

== Levedale School ==
A school-church at Levedale, which was used for a day-school, was built in 1881, average attendances c. 1884 being 25 boys and girls and 65 infants. The land was given by Lord Hatherton who paid for the building. This was still existing as a school-church down to 1900 but by 1912 was described as a mission church.

== Levedale the name ==
Documented use of the name Levedale comes in c.1215 as seen in the names of Geoffrey son of John de Levedale and William son of Stephen de Levedale.

== See also ==
- Listed buildings in Penkridge
