= Brinsford =

Brinsford may refer to:

- Brinsford (HM Prison), a prison and Young Offenders Institution in Wolverhampton
- Brinsford Lodge, a former hall of residence for The Polytechnic, Wolverhampton (now the University of Wolverhampton)
- Brinsford Parkway railway station, a prospective new parkway railway station to the north of Wolverhampton
