= Penkridge weather station =

Weather station at Penkridge

Coordinates: 52.7°N 2.12°W

Penkridge weather station is a weather station at Penkridge in Staffordshire, England, operated by the Met Office. It is situated on the site of Rodbaston College.

The station is 101 m above mean sea level.

Below are the 1981-2010 averages.

Month	Jan	Feb	Mar	Apr	May	Jun	Jul	Aug	Sep	Oct	Nov	Dec	Year
Average max. temperature °C	6.9	7.3	10.1	12.8	16.2	19.1	21.5	21.1	18.2	14.0	10.0	7.2	13.7
Average min. temperature °C	1.5	1.2	2.9	4.0	6.8	9.6	11.7	11.5	9.6	6.9	3.9	1.6	6.0
Rainfall mm	58.2	39.7	47.6	51.1	55.7	58.5	55.5	59.0	60.5	67.4	64.5	63.5	681.2
Source: Met Office
