= Bickford =

Coordinates: 52.726°N 2.170°W

- Location within Staffordshire
- OS grid reference: SJ8814
- Shire county: Staffordshire
- Region: West Midlands
- Country: England
- Sovereign state: United Kingdom
- Post town: Stafford
- Postcode district: ST19
- Police: Staffordshire
- Fire: Staffordshire
- Ambulance: West Midlands
- UK Parliament: Stone, Great Wyrley and Penkridge

Bickford is a village in Staffordshire, England. For population details taken at the 2011 census see Penkridge.

== See also ==
- Listed buildings in Penkridge
