= Pillaton, Staffordshire =

Coordinates: 52.717806°N 2.082724°W

Pillaton
- Location within Staffordshire
- Civil parish: Penkridge
- Shire county: Staffordshire
- Region: West Midlands
- Country: England
- Sovereign state: United Kingdom
- Post town: Stafford
- Postcode district: ST19
- Police: Staffordshire
- Fire: Staffordshire
- Ambulance: West Midlands

Pillaton is a small village in Staffordshire, England, nearby to Penkridge and lying on the B5012 road between Cannock and Penkridge.

It falls under the ST19 postcode district, associating it more with Penkridge and the county town Stafford. Pillaton serves more as a main commuting point between Cannock and Penkridge, although a few small business are based there, including Pillaton Hall Farm. Pillaton Hall, an earlier building, was the seat of the Littleton family, who became dominant landowners in the Penkridge and Cannock areas during the 16th and 17th centuries, before moving to Teddesley Hall in the mid-18th century.

== See also ==
- Listed buildings in Penkridge

== Sources ==
1. Google Maps search of "pillaton staffordshire"

]
