= Brinsford Parkway railway station =

Railway station in Staffordshire, England

Coordinates: 52°39′4″N 2°7′6″W

Brinsford Parkway

General information
- Location: Featherstone, South Staffordshire; England
- Grid reference: SJ920059
- Managed by: West Midlands Trains
- Platforms: 2

Brinsford Parkway is a proposed mainline railway station to the north of Wolverhampton, England. It has yet to be passed and is still in planning stages.

It would be located on the Rugby-Birmingham-Stafford Line loop of the West Coast Main Line, and would give the north of Wolverhampton local commuter trains easing congestion on the A449, M6 and M54 motorways. Penkridge is the only station that remains open on the line between Wolverhampton and Stafford.

The proposed station would serve a new development on the MoD depot at Brinsford (whose builder would fund the station), other local communities and passengers drawn from the motorway network. It would provide Park and Ride facilities, with a large car park.

It is planned to have two platforms on the existing double tracked, electrified line.

== See also ==
- West Coast Main Line
- Rugby-Birmingham-Stafford Line

Preceding station	Future services	Following station
Wolverhampton	London Northwestern Railway; Rugby-Birmingham-Stafford Line	Penkridge
