= Listed buildings in Penkridge =

Penkridge is a civil parish in the district of South Staffordshire, Staffordshire, England. It contains 76 listed buildings that are recorded in the National Heritage List for England. Of these, one is listed at Grade I, the highest of the three grades, two are at Grade II*, the middle grade, and the others are at Grade II, the lowest grade. The parish contains the town of Penkridge, smaller settlements including Bickford, Levedale, Pillaton, and Whiston, and the surrounding countryside. Most of the listed buildings are houses and associated structures, cottages, farmhouses, farm buildings, public houses, and shops, the earlier of which are timber framed or have a timber framed core. The other listed buildings include a church, monuments and other structures in the churchyard, bridges, stocks and a bench, a former lock-up, a railway viaduct, a public library, and a mill.

== Key ==
Grade	Criteria
I	Buildings of exceptional interest, sometimes considered to be internationally important
II*	Particularly important buildings of more than special interest
II	Buildings of national importance and special interest

== Buildings ==
Name and location	Photograph	Date	Notes	Grade
St Michael's Church; 52.72503°N 2.11784°W		13th century	Originally a collegiate church, it was altered and enlarged in the 14th and 16th centuries, and restored in 1881 by J. A. Chatwin.. It is built in red sandstone with lead-covered roofs, and consists of a nave with a clerestory, north and south aisles, a south porch, a chancel with a clerestory and aisles, a northwest vestry and a west tower. The tower has three stages, a west door with a pointed head, a west window with four lights, a moulded string course, a frieze with shields, and an embattled parapet with corner and centre crocketed pinnacles. The parapets of the nave, aisles, porch, and chancel are embattled and have crocketed pinnacles, and the west window has five lights.	I
Churchyard cross 52.72483°N 2.11771°W		14th century (probable)	The cross is in the churchyard of St Michael's Church, and the upper parts were replaced in the 19th century. It has a square base, a square pedestal, an octagonal shaft, and a cusped cross.	II
Church Farm, Pinfold Lane; 52.72541°N 2.11856°W		15th century (probable)	A house with a timber framed core and cruck construction, later encased in brick and extended, it is in red brick and has a tile roof. The original part has two storeys and two bays, the extension to the right has two storeys and two bays, and to the left is a gabled cross-wing with two storeys and an attic. In the angle is a lean-to porch. The windows are casements, in the ground floor of the cross-wing is a bay window, and the windows in the upper floor of the wing have segmental heads. Inside the original part are two cruck trusses.	II
The Old Cottage, Bellbrook; 52.72500°N 2.11197°W		15th century (probable)	A timber framed house, partly rebuilt in brick, with a tile roof. There are two storeys and an attic, and three bays. The windows are casements with latticed glazing, there is a blocked small window, and a blocked oriel window on shaped brackets.	II
Pillaton Old Hall; 52.71410°N 2.08613°W		1488	The oldest part is the chapel, the rest of the house dating from the late 15th century, with alterations in 1706 and a restoration in 1888. Only the gatehouse range survives from the house, and a wing was added in about 1980. The gatehouse is in brick with a stone plinth and dressings, the chapel is in stone, and the roofs are tiled. The chapel projecting to the left has an embattled parapet and mullioned windows. The entrance to the gatehouse is approached by a bridge. It has three storeys and two bays, an entrance with a Tudor arch, mullioned and transomed windows, and is flanked by circular turrets with domed tops on V-shaped buttresses. Outside the gatehouse are two-storey ranges, the left range with an embattled parapet, and the right range with a moulded cornice. The moated site on which the hall stands is a Scheduled Monument.	II*
Church Cottages; 52.72538°N 2.11793°W	—	15th or early 16th century	A house, later three cottages, it is timber framed with brick infill, partly roughcast and partly rebuilt in brick, with a tile roof. There are two storeys and six bays. There is one sash window, and the other windows are casements. Inside, there is some exposed timber framing.	II
Kinvaston Hall Farmhouse; 52.70843°N 2.13694°W	—	Early 16th century	The farmhouse was later remodelled and extended. It has a timber framed core, and is in red brick with a tile roof. The farmhouse consists of a hall range with two storeys and two bays, projecting gabled cross-wings with two storeys and attics, and a rear wing. The central doorway has a bracketed head, and the windows are casements, those in the lower floors with segmental heads.	II
Chimney stack northeast of Pillaton Old Hall; 52.71402°N 2.08658°W	—	Early 16th century	The chimney stack, which served the demolished east range of the hall, is in red brick on a sandstone plinth. It is rectangular, about 20 feet (6.1 m) high, and there is a large blocked fireplace on the west side.	II
Corner Cottage, Market Place; 52.72454°N 2.11292°W	—	16th century	A house on a corner site, it was extended in the 17th century and remodelled in the 19th century. The original part is timber framed with painted brick infill, the replacement is in painted brick, and the roof is tiled. There are two storeys, the front facing Market Place has three bays, the left bay gabled with bargeboards and a finial. The left bay contains a bay windows, and the other windows are casements. The doorway is on the front facing New Street.	II
Two Steps, Market Street; 52.72529°N 2.11449°W	—	16th century (probable)	A timber framed house, at one time an inn, with infill and repairs in painted brick and a tile roof. There are two storeys and two bays. In the centre is a doorway, and the windows are casements, those in the ground floor with shutters.	II
Barn northwest of Pillaton Old Hall; 52.71432°N 2.08698°W	—	16th century (probable)	The barn was largely rebuilt in the 18th century and later. It is in red brick with rusticated quoins, dentilled eaves, and a slate roof. There is one storey, it is partly lofted, and has five bays. The barn contains doorways, windows, some of which are blocked, and ventilation holes.	II
The Old Deanery, Pinfold Lane; 52.72571°N 2.11839°W	—	Late 16th century (probable)	The oldest part is the two-bay hall range, which is in sandstone, and this is flanked by 17th-century timber framed gabled cross-wings that are partly faced in brick and roughcast. There are two storeys, and the roof is tiled. The windows in the hall range are chamfered and mullioned, and with a hood mould in the ground floor, and in the cross-wings they are casements. The doorway in the hall range has a segmental pointed head and a moulded surround.	II*
General Stores, Market Place; 52.72523°N 2.11439°W	—	16th to 17th century	A timber framed shop, partly replaced in brick, with a tile roof and three bays. The middle bay is gabled with an attic, and contains a shop front with two casement windows above. The left bay has a single storey and contains a shop window flanked by pilasters, and in the right bay is a carriage entrance with a loft above.	II
Garden wall northeast of Pillaton Old Hall; 52.71448°N 2.08559°W	—	16th or 17th century	The wall surrounds four sides of the rectangular garden. It is in red brick, it contains a large gateway, and there are buttresses about every 15 yards (14 m).	II
The White Hart; 52.72601°N 2.11606°W		Early 17th century	A house, later a public house, it was restored and partly rebuilt in the 20th century. It is timber framed with a tile roof, and has two storeys and an attic, the upper storey and attic jettied with moulded bressumers, and three gabled bays. The attic windows are mullioned, and the windows in the lower floors are mullioned and transomed and slightly bowed. The doorway has a rectangular fanlight and an ogee head, and to the right is a carriage entrance.	II
Bowcroft Cottages, New Road; 52.72393°N 2.11390°W	—	17th century	A house, later divided, it is timber framed with painted brick infill and a tile roof. There is one storey and an attic, and three bays. The doorway has a bracketed roof, the windows are casements, and there are three gabled dormers.	II
Lower Drayton Cottages; 52.73944°N 2.10194°W	—	17th century	A row of houses, originally timber framed, with replacements and extensions in brick, dentilled eaves, and tile roofs. There are two storeys, a hall range, a cross-wing, and later extensions. The windows are casements, and the porches are gabled with semicircular-headed arches.	II
Mershac, Cannock Road; 52.72447°N 2.11068°W	—	17th century	A timber framed house that was later extended to the east in brick, with a tile roof. There is one storey and an attic, and three bays. The windows are casements with leaded panes, and there are three gabled dormers.	II
Mill End, Teddesley Road; 52.72749°N 2.11223°W		17th century	A timber framed cottage with brick infill, some rebuilding in brick, and a slate roof. There is one storey and an attic, and two bays. In the centre is a doorway, and the windows are casements.	II
Pillaton Farm Cottages; 52.71744°N 2.08274°W	—	17th century	A row of three cottages with a timber framed core, they were later remodelled and altered. The cottages are in brown brick, and have dentilled eaves, and a tile roof. There are two storeys and a roughly L-shaped plan, with a front of three bays. The doorways have segmental heads, and the windows are casements with latticed glazing, those in the ground floor with segmental heads. Inside, there is exposed timber framing.	II
Former Railway Inn, Clay Street; 52.72385°N 2.11606°W		17th century	A house, then an inn, later used for other purposes, it is timber framed and roughcast, with a tile roof. There is one storey and an attic, three bays, and a single-storey extension to the left. In the ground floor are bay windows flanking a doorway, and there is a smaller bracketed bay window to the right. In the attic are three dormers with weatherboarded gables, and the extension contains a casement window. There is exposed timber framing in the right gable end and internally.	II
Reynard's, Cannock Road; 52.72431°N 2.11052°W	—	17th century	A timber framed house with a tile roof, two storeys and three bays. The doorway has a rustic porch, and the windows are casements.	II
Sarum, Market Street; 52.72517°N 2.11427°W	—	17th century	A house, originally timber framed, largely rebuilt in the 19th century. It is in brick with dentilled eaves and a tile roof. There are two storeys, three bays, and a rear wing. In the right bay are two doorways, the one to the left with a moulded surround. The windows are casements with segmental heads.	II
The Cottage, Market Place; 52.72458°N 2.11297°W	—	17th century	The cottage, which was remodelled in the 19th century, has a timber framed core, partly replaced in painted brick, with a tile roof. There are two storeys and two bays. In the centre is a doorway with a segmental head, the windows are casements, and at the left end is an exposed timber post.	II
Whiston Hall; 52.72806°N 2.16085°W	—	17th century	The house was later altered and extended. The original part is timber framed, the extensions are in red brick, and the roof is tiled, partly with coped verges. There are two storeys and attics, and an L-shaped plan. The original range has two bays and a single-storey extension to the left, and at the rear are two later parallel wings. The original range has casement windows, and the rear wings contain a bay window, casement windows with segmental heads, a gabled dormer, and a doorway with reeded pilasters.	II
Corner House, Mill Street; 52.72613°N 2.11369°W	—	1673	A house on a corner site, later used for other purposes, it is roughcast with a floor band and a tile roof. There are two storeys and an attic, and two bays. The central doorway has a bracketed hood, the windows are casements, and in the left gable end is a datestone.	II
Wyre Hall, wall and railings, Cannock Road; 52.72460°N 2.11149°W	—	Late 17th century	The house, which was later extended and altered, is in red brick with stone dressings, on a stone plinth, with quoins, and a tile roof with coped verges on kneelers. The original part has two parallel ranges, and in the 18th century a further range was added to the east. The original part has two gabled bays and three storeys. The doorway in the left bay has a panelled surround, it is flanked by small fixed windows, to the right is a mullioned and transomed window, and the upper floors contain casement windows with decorative glazing. The later range has two storeys and three bays, and contains a canted bay window to the right, a round-headed doorway to the left, and mullioned and transomed windows. A dwarf wall with cast iron railings extends from the house to the east for about 10 yards (9.1 m).	II
Pair of memorials 4 yards south of chancel 52.72497°N 2.11759°W	—	c. 1700	The memorials are in the churchyard of St Michael's Church. They are chest tombs in stone, and each has a rectangular plan. They have oversailing caps, and one has panelled sides.	II
Pair of memorials 15 yards south of chancel 52.72491°N 2.11754°W	—	c. 1700	The memorials are in the churchyard of St Michael's Church. They are chest tombs in stone, and each has a rectangular plan. They have panelled sides and moulded edges to slightly oversailing caps.	II
Lower Mitton Farmhouse; 52.73428°N 2.17226°W	—	Early 18th century	The farmhouse, which was later extended, is in red brick with dentilled eaves and a tile roof. There are two storeys and three bays, a parallel range to the rear, and a later rear wing. On the front is a gabled porch and a doorway with a fanlight, and the windows are casement with segmental heads.	II
Manor Farmhouse, barn and granary, Congreve; 52.71673°N 2.14236°W	—	Early 18th century	The farmhouse and farm buildings are in red brick with tile roofs. The farmhouse has dentilled eaves, two storeys and four bays. There are two doorways, one with a lean-to porch, one bow window, and the other windows are casements with segmental heads. The barn to the right is lower with one storey and two bays, and the granary, further to the right and lower still, has two storeys and one bay.	II
Preston Vale Farmhouse; 52.72869°N 2.14818°W	—	Early 18th century	The farmhouse is in red brick with floor bands and a slate roof. There are two storeys and an attic, two bays, and two parallel ranges with extensions. The doorway has a bracketed slate hood, to the left is a canted bay window with a hipped roof, the other windows are casements with segmental heads, and in the right extension is another canted bay window.	II
Pear Tree Farmhouse and farm buildings, Bickton; 52.72642°N 2.16839°W		Early to mid 18th century	The farmhouse, barn and stables are in red brick with tile roofs. The farmhouse has two storeys, dentilled eaves, four bays, and a low lean-to extension to the right. In the centre is a doorway approached by steps, and the windows are casements with segmental heads. The barn and stables form two rear ranges.	II
Ivy House and Cuttlestone Mews, St Michael's Square; 52.72483°N 2.11687°W	—	1741	A house later extended and divided into two dwellings, it is in red brick with a tile roof. There is an L-shaped plan, with the main house facing north, a rear wing and a further extension facing west. The main house has two storeys and an attic, and three bays. The central doorway has a moulded surround and a rectangular fanlight, above it is a datestone, and the windows are sashes. The rear wing and extension have two storeys and contain a mix of sash and casement windows.	II
Cuttlestone Bridge; 52.72153°N 2.12790°W		18th century	The bridge carries a road over the River Penk. It is in stone, and consists of four semicircular arches. The cutwaters are carried up as buttresses, and there is a parapet band to a plain parapet that ends in square piers.	II
Group of three memorials east of chancel 52.72512°N 2.11735°W	—	18th century	The memorials are in the churchyard of St Michael's Church. They are chest tombs in stone, and each has a rectangular plan. The tombs have moulded bases and oversailing caps with moulded edges, two have panelled sides, and the other has panels with egg and dart ornament.	II
Garden Cottage, Mill End Cottage, and The Cottage, Teddesley Road; 52.72849°N 2.10960°W	—	18th century	A group of three cottages in red brick on a sandstone plinth with tile roofs. Garden Cottage and The Cottage have one storey and attics, The Cottage has a porch, and the windows are casements with segmental heads and hood moulds. Mill End Cottage has two storeys, a porch and casement windows with cast iron frames.	II
Wall and gate piers north of Kinvaston Hall Farmhouse; 52.70859°N 2.13693°W	—	18th century	The wall encloses the rectangular garden in front of the farmhouse, and is in red brick with a sandstone plinth and coping. In the centre are square gate piers with moulded caps.	II
Bridge and causeway north of Pillaton Old Hall; 52.71422°N 2.08618°W	—	18th century	The main approach to the hall, the bridge and causeway are in red brick and stone. The bridge has a single segmental arch over the moat. The coped parapet continues to the north, and ends in piers with ball finials.	II
Stocks and bench 52.72514°N 2.11208°W	—	18th century	The stocks and bench are in the forecourt of The Lock-up. They are in timber, and the stocks have two posts with a square section and contains four holes.	II
The Round House; 52.69124°N 2.11981°W		18th century	A lock keeper's house, later a private house, it is in red brick and has a circular plan. There are two storeys, an embattled parapet and a chimney carried up as a turret. The windows are casements.	II
Former premises of Ashe and Nephew, Market Street; 52.72513°N 2.11414°W	—	Late 18th century	A house, later a shop, in painted brick, with a band and a tile roof. There are two storeys and three bays. In the ground floor is a 20th-century shop front and a passage entry to the left with a segmental arch. In the upper floor are sash windows with segmental heads.	II
Field House Farmhouse, Levedale; 52.74560°N 2.15135°W	—	Late 18th century	A red brick farmhouse with floor bands and a slate roof. There are three storeys, an L-shaped plan, and a front of three bays. In the centre is a doorway with Tuscan pilasters and a slated hood, flanked by canted bay windows. The other windows are sashes with wedge lintels.	II
Longridge House; 52.73893°N 2.13964°W	—	Late 18th century	A house, later used for other purposes, in red brick with a tile roof. There are three storeys, and a T-shaped plan, consisting of a main range of three bays, and a rear wing, and there is a conservatory added to the south. The central doorway has pilasters, a rectangular fanlight, and a cornice hood. The windows are sashes with wedge lintels, and those in the ground floor are tripartite.	II
Lower Drayton Bridge; 52.73962°N 2.10034°W		Late 18th century	The bridge carries a track over the River Penk. It is in red brick on a stone plinth, and consists of two semicircular arches. The bridge has a parapet band and a plain parapet.	II
Pair of memorials southwest of tower 52.72458°N 2.11820°W	—	Late 18th century	The memorials are in the churchyard of St Michael's Church, and consist of two altar tombs in stone. They have a square plan, both have moulded bases and an oversailing cornice, one has an egg-shaped finial, and the other has fluted pilasters.	II
Pillaton Farmhouse; 52.71759°N 2.08319°W	—	Late 18th century	A brown brick farmhouse with floor bands, dentilled eaves, and a slate roof. There are two storeys and an attic, and a T-shaped plan, with a three-bay main range and a rear wing. The central doorway has a rectangular fanlight and a bracketed hood, and the windows are casements with segmental heads.	II
Preston Hill Farmhouse; 52.72871°N 2.13509°W	—	Late 18th century	The farmhouse is in red brick with dentilled eaves and a tile roof. There are three storeys and three bays. In the centre is a Tuscan porch and a doorway with a rectangular fanlight. This is flanked by canted bay windows, and the other windows are sashes.	II
Barn and engine house, Preston Vale Farm; 52.72904°N 2.14801°W	—	Late 18th century	The barn and the steam engine house, which dates from the 19th century, are in red brick with roofs of tile and slate. The barn has one and two storeys and five bays, with dentilled eaves, a cart entry, a doorway, casement windows, and air vents. The engine house has two bays, one with one storey and a loft, and the other with one storey, and at the rear is a square chimney stack.	II
Former Whitehouse Pharmacy, Market Street; 52.72506°N 2.11404°W	—	Late 18th century	A house, later a shop, in painted brick with floor bands and a tile roof. There are three storeys and three bays. In the ground floor is a doorway flanked by recessed bow windows. The upper floors contain sash windows, those in the middle floor with segmental heads.	II
Levedale House; 52.74724°N 2.15074°W	—	c. 1800	A red brick house on a sandstone plinth with a tile roof. There are three storeys, a front range of three bays, and two rear gabled wings. In the centre is a Tuscan porch and a doorway with a rectangular fanlight, and the windows are casements with segmental heads.	II
Otherton Farmhouse; 52.70914°N 2.10396°W	—	c. 1800	The farmhouse is in red brick with a tile roof. It has three storeys and an attic, and three bays. In the centre is a doorway, and the windows are casements with segmental heads.	II
Wharf Cottage; 52.69122°N 2.11948°W		c. 1800	The cottage is in brick with dentilled eaves and a tile roof. There are two storeys and one bay. On the front is a doorway, and cast iron casement windows with pointed heads and Gothic glazing.	II
Wolgarston Farmhouse; 52.72521°N 2.09605°W	—	c. 1800	The farmhouse is in red brick, it is rendered, and has a tile roof. There are three storeys and three bays. On the front is a Tuscan porch, and the doorway has a rectangular fanlight. The windows in the ground floor are casements, in the upper floors they are sashes, and the windows in the lower two floors with segmental heads.	II
Group of three memorials south of chancel 52.72487°N 2.11745°W	—	18th and early 19th century	The memorials are in the churchyard of St Michael's Church, and consist of two chest tombs and one altar tomb, all in stone. The chest tombs have moulded bases and caps, fluted corner pilasters with gadrooned bases, and highly decorative panels on the sides. The altar tomb is to Joseph-Lees, and has panelled sides framed by fluted corner pilasters, and an oversailing cap stepped up to a domed top.	II
Group of four memorials south of south aisle 52.72489°N 2.11767°W	—	Late 18th and early 19th century	The memorials are in the churchyard of St Michael's Church; they are in stone, three are altar tombs and one is a chest tomb. The altar tombs have moulded bases and moulded oversailing caps, and one has an urn finial and a fluted frieze. The chest tomb has fluted corner pilasters.	II
Group of four memorials south southwest of west tower 52.72485°N 2.11808°W	—	Late 18th and early 19th century	The memorials are in the churchyard of St Michael's Church, and are altar tombs in stone with a square plan. Two of the tombs have oval panels on the sides, and oversailing caps with moulded edges.	II
Keeling family memorial 52.72492°N 2.11830°W	—	Late 18th and early 19th century	The memorial is in the churchyard of St Michael's Church, and is to the memory of members of the Keeling family. It is an altar tomb in stone, and has a square plan. The tomb has a moulded base and panelled sides, fluted corner pilasters, and an oversailing moulded cornice to a low concave sided cap surmounted by an urn.	II
Tomlinson family memorial 52.72491°N 2.11794°W	—	Late 18th and early 19th century	The memorial is in the churchyard of St Michael's Church, and is to the memory of members of the Tomlinson family. It is an altar tomb in stone, and has a square plan. The tomb has a moulded base and an oversailing moulded cornice to a low concave sided cap.	II
George Adams memorial 52.72486°N 2.11790°W	—	1809	The memorial is in the churchyard of St Michael's Church, and is to the memory of George Adams. It is an altar tomb in stone, and has a square plan. The tomb has a moulded base and an oversailing moulded cornice stepped cap surmounted by a fluted urn.	II
Lower Mitton Road Bridge; 52.73484°N 2.17173°W		c. 1810	The bridge carries a road over the Church Eaton Brook. It is in red brick and stone, and consists of a single shallow arch. The bridge has a band, a coped parapet, and piers with pyramidal caps.	II
Robert Moore memorial 52.72475°N 2.11767°W	—	1817	The memorial is in the churchyard of St Michael's Church, and is to the memory of Robert Moore. It is a chest tomb in stone, and has a rectangular plan. The tomb has a chamfered base, plain corner pilasters, shaped panels to the sides and a stepped cap.	II
School House, Market Place; 52.72485°N 2.11301°W	—	1818	The house, designed by Joseph Potter in Gothic style, is in brown brick, with an eaves band, and a slate roof with coped verges on kneelers. There are two storeys and three bays. The doorway is panelled, and has a pointed fanlight with Gothic glazing and a bracketed hood, and to the left is a shoe scraper with a pointed arch. The windows are casements, also with pointed heads and Gothic glazing.	II
Haling-Dene Centre, Cannock Road; 52.72405°N 2.10950°W	—	Early 19th century	A house, later offices, stuccoed, with an eaves band, and a tile roof that has coped verges. There are two storeys, a main range of three bays, a single-storey wing to the left, and a two-storey wings to the right, both with a cornice band and a parapet. The main range has an Ionic porch, and a doorway with a moulded surround flanked by two-storey canted bay windows. The other windows are a mix of sashes and casements.	II
Keeling family memorial 52.72461°N 2.11796°W	—	Early 19th century	The memorial is in the churchyard of St Michael's Church, and is to the memory of members of the Keeling family. It is an altar tomb in stone, and has a square plan. The tomb has a moulded base and a stepped cap surmounted by a fluted urn.	II
Rock House, New Road; 52.72314°N 2.11313°W	—	Early 19th century	A red brick house with overhanging eaves and a hipped slate roof. There are two storeys and three bays. In the centre is a Tuscan portico, and the windows are sashes.	II
The Boat Inn, Cannock Road; 52.72404°N 2.10789°W		Early 19th century	The public house is in red brick with dentilled eaves and a tile roof. There are two storeys and an attic, and an L-shaped plan with a front of three bays. The doorway has a moulded surround, and the windows are sashes with lintels grooved as voussoirs, and raised keystones.	II
The Littleton Arms; 52.72495°N 2.11635°W		Early 19th century	The public house, on a corner site, is stuccoed and has a slate roof, and an L-shaped plan, with a main range and two parallel rear wings. The main range has six bays, the third bay with a pedimented gable, and containing a doorway approached by a double flight of steps with a handrail, and with a bracketed hood. This bay and those to the right have two storeys, and the two bays to the left have three storeys. The rear wing facing the road has three storeys and four bays, and contains a doorway. The windows are sashes.	II
The Lock-up, Bellbrook; 52.72509°N 2.11217°W		Early 19th century	The former lock-up is in red brick with stone dressings, dentilled eaves, and a tile roof. There is one storey and two bays, and it contains doorways and windows, one of the windows with iron bars.	II
The Manor House, Congreve; 52.71692°N 2.14412°W	—	Early 19th century	The house, which incorporates earlier material, is in red brick with a tile roof. There are two storeys and an attic, and a main range of three bays flanked by projecting gabled wings. In the centre is a doorway that has a segmental-headed fanlight with decorative glazing. The windows are casements with segmental heads, and there are two gabled dormers.	II
Hatherton Restaurant; 52.72379°N 2.12130°W	—	c. 1831	A vicarage, later used for other purposes, it has plastered walls and a hipped slate roof. There are two storeys, a main range of three bays, and a service wing to the right. In the centre is a pedimented Serlian porch that has a doorway with a rectangular fanlight. The windows are sashes, one of which is tripartite with mullions.	II
Railway bridge over Pinfold Lane; 52.72544°N 2.11915°W		c. 1837	The bridge carries the railway over Pinfold Road, and is in blue and brown brick with stone dressings. It consists of a single semicircular arch with rusticated voussoirs, a parapet band, a coped parapet, and projecting abutments.	II
Railway viaduct 52.72767°N 2.11879°W		1837	The viaduct, built by Thomas Brassey, carries the railway over the River Penk and Levedale Road. It is in red brick and engineering brick, with stone dressings, quoins, and chamfered rustication. The viaduct consists of seven segmental arches springing from imposts. It has a parapet band, a plain coped parapet, and abutments sweeping forward on each side.	II
Public Library, Bellbrook; 52.72481°N 2.11167°W		1858	A police station, later the public library, it is in orange brick with stone dressings and a slate roof. It consists of a main range with a recessed wing to the right and a projecting wing to the left. The main block has one storey and an attic and three bays, with pilasters and a dentilled eaves cornice. The middle bay contains a pedimented porch, with a doorway that has a cornice hood, and above is a window with a semicircular head and a fluted keystone. The windows are sashes with architraves and fluted keystones. The right wing has one storey and two bays, and a hipped roof, and it contains a mullioned window and a doorway with a fanlight. The left wing has one storey, one bay and a hipped roof.	II
Gates, gate piers, walls and war memorial 52.72500°N 2.11718°W		Late 19th century	At the entrance to the churchyard are central paired gates flanked by smaller gates with gabled piers, the inner ones with octagonal caps. Along the east side of the churchyard is a coped wall; all are in stone, and the gates are in wrought iron. To the right is a war memorial in Gothic style, with a canopied crucifix, and crocketed finials on a panelled pedestal.	II
Whiston Mill; 52.72567°N 2.14817°W	—	Undated	The mill and millhouse are in red brick with a tile roof, the mill has three storeys, to the north is a lower wheelhouse, and to the south is the millhouse, which has been considerably altered. The mill contains a stable door, a hoist door, and casement windows, and in the wheelhouse are arched openings. Some of the machinery survives inside the mill.	II
