= Pennocrucium =

Archaeological site in Penkridge, Staffordshire, England

Coordinates: 52.694°N 2.144°W

Watling Street north of St Albans. The map shows the Roman towns established along Watling Street by the end of the first century AD.

Pennocrucium was a Romano-British settlement and military complex located at present day Water Eaton, just south of Penkridge, Staffordshire, with evidence of occupation from the mid-1st century until the 4th century.

The settlement was mentioned in the 2nd century Antonine Itinerary, which described it as lying 12 miles from Uxacona (near present-day Oakengates) and 12 miles from Letocetum (Wall, near Lichfield). The exact site of Pennocrucium was identified only after aerial photography revealed cropmarks in 1946, and excavations were conducted by Kenneth St Joseph over subsequent years.

Pennocrucium was an important road junction on Watling Street – the main Roman road across the Midlands to Viroconium Cornoviorum (Wroxeter) – and was situated 700 metres east of its crossing of the River Penk, with roads leading north to Mediolanum (Whitchurch) and south in the direction of Greensforge near Kinver and Metchley Fort in Birmingham.

The main civilian defensive site or burgi was a rectangular enclosure approximately 450 feet (140 m) from north to south and 700 feet (210 m) from east to west, lying astride Watling Street and surrounded by three ditches. There may have been a civilian vicus around the defended settlement, possibly forming a ribbon development along Watling Street. 800 metres (2,600 ft) to the north east of the civilian settlement lay a large double-ditched enclosure identified as a possible Vexillation fortress, with two smaller forts lying 700 feet (210 m) south east of the settlement and 200 feet (60 m) north of Watling Street on the opposite bank of the Penk. Five single-ditched enclosures in the vicinity have been identified as temporary marching camps.
