= Whiston, South Staffordshire =

Coordinates: 52.726°N 02.16°W

Whiston
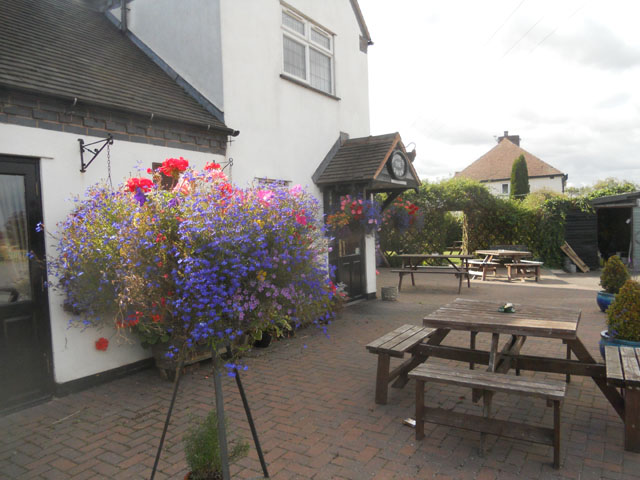
- The Swan at Whiston

- Location within Staffordshire
- District: South Staffordshire
- Shire county: Staffordshire
- Region: West Midlands
- Country: England
- Sovereign state: United Kingdom
- Post town: Stafford
- Postcode district: ST19
- Police: Staffordshire
- Fire: Staffordshire
- Ambulance: West Midlands

Whiston is a hamlet in the South Staffordshire district of Staffordshire, England. Population details taken at the 2011 census can be found under Penkridge.

== See also ==
- Listed buildings in Penkridge
