= Penkridge railway station =

Railway station in Staffordshire, England

Coordinates: 52.724°N 2.119°W

Penkridge
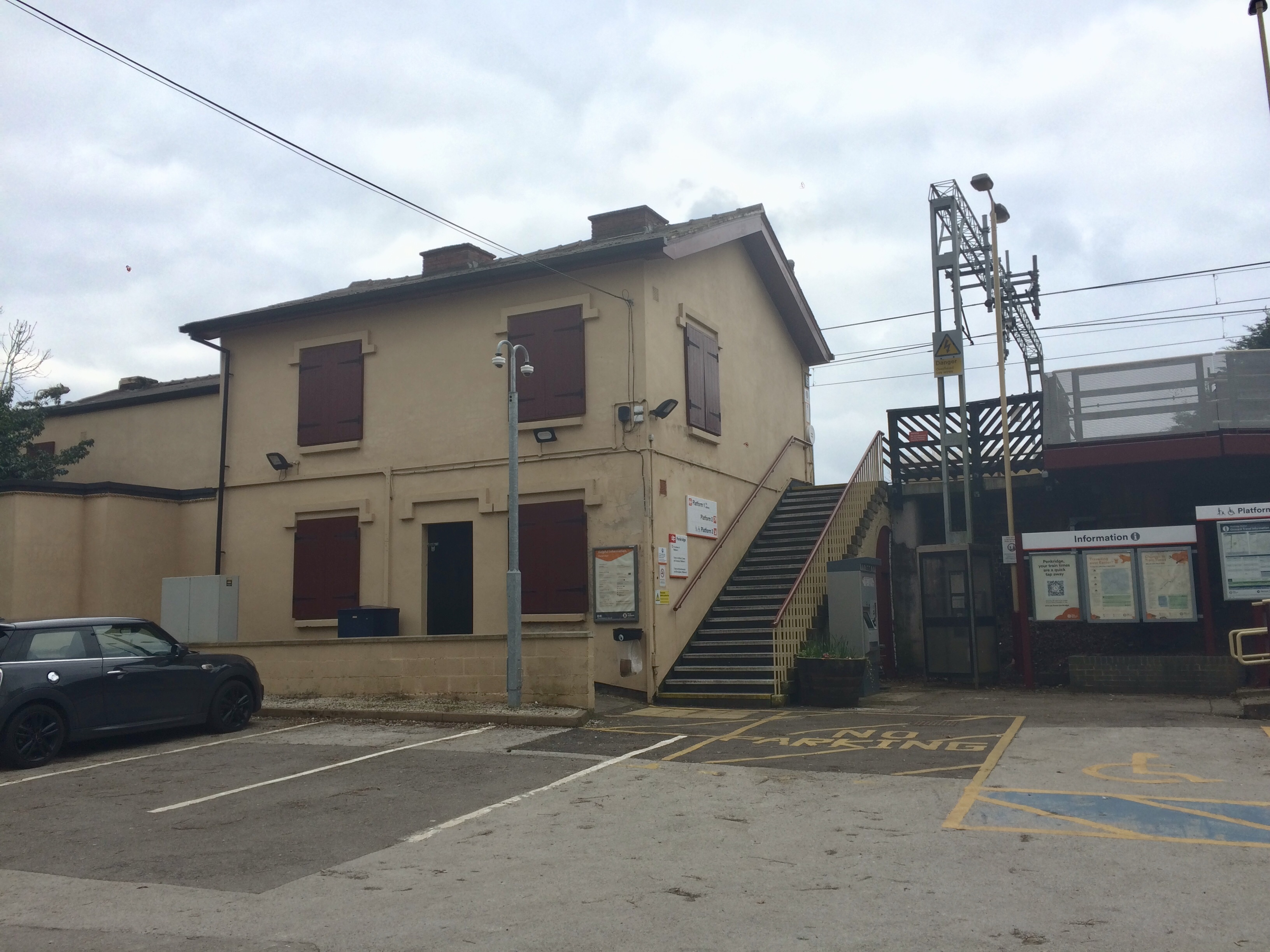
- Penkridge station building, 2021

General information
- Location: Penkridge, South Staffordshire; England
- Grid reference: SJ920139
- Manager: London Northwestern Railway
- Platforms: 2

Other information
- Station code: PKG
- Classification: DfT category F1

Passengers
- 2021/22: ▲0.233 million
- 2022/23: ▼0.231 million
- 2023/24: ▲0.261 million
- 2024/25: ▲0.293 million
- 2025/26: ▲0.334 million
Location
Notes
- Passenger statistics from the Office of Rail and Road

Penkridge railway station is a railway station serving the village of Penkridge in Staffordshire, England.

It is on the Birmingham loop of the West Coast Main Line. To the north, the line continues towards Stafford; to the south, the line continues towards the city of Wolverhampton. The station is operated by West Midlands Railway.

== History ==
The original station was built by the Grand Junction Railway and opened in 1837. Baron Hatherton allowed trains to run across his land on the condition that two trains a day stopped at Penkridge. When closure of the station was proposed in 1962, the incumbent Baron Hatherton threatened to withdraw the right to cross his land if the station was closed. The station buildings appear to have been disused at some point before 1981. Nearby to Penkridge is a former mineral branch line to the nearby village of Huntington. It served a colliery until the 1980s. The trackbed is a footpath from the Wolverhampton Road to Micklewood Lane near Huntington. The rest of the trackbed is now both agricultural and built on at Huntingdon end by a school.

The station's two platforms used to be link by a footbridge, but this was removed sometime between 1990 and 2003, replaced by an underpass immediately to the south of the station building.

== Services ==
As of December 2023, Penkridge station is served only by West Midlands Trains services.

The usual weekday off-peak service is as follows:

Northbound:

- 1 train per hour (tph) to Liverpool Lime Street via Stafford, Crewe and Runcorn.

Southbound:

- 1 train per hour to Birmingham New Street via Wolverhampton.

Two trains per hour between Liverpool and Birmingham operate during weekday peaks and Saturdays.

The station previously had a slightly unusual weekday service pattern, in that there were two trains per hour southbound to Birmingham New Street but only one per hour northbound to Crewe and Liverpool Lime Street.

=== Withdrawn and suspended services ===
It was formerly served by services to London Euston, but these were withdrawn in December 2019. It was also formerly served by services to Crewe via Stoke-on-Trent, but these were withdrawn in December 2023 as they were now operating only between Stafford and Crewe instead of Birmingham New Street and Crewe.

Preceding station	National Rail	Following station
Stafford towards Liverpool Lime Street	London Northwestern Railway Birmingham–Liverpool	Wolverhampton towards Birmingham New Street
Previous services
Stafford	West Midlands Railway Birmingham – Stoke – Crewe	Wolverhampton
	Disused railways	
Stafford	London and North Western Railway former Grand Junction Railway	Gailey
