= South Staffordshire District Council elections =

Local government elections in Staffordshire, England

South Staffordshire District Council elections are held every four years. South Staffordshire District Council is the local authority for the non-metropolitan district of South Staffordshire in Staffordshire, England. Since the last boundary changes in 2023, 42 councillors have been elected from 20 wards.

== Council elections ==
- 1973 South Staffordshire District Council election
- 1976 South Staffordshire District Council election
- 1979 South Staffordshire District Council election (New ward boundaries)
- 1983 South Staffordshire District Council election
- 1987 South Staffordshire District Council election
- 1991 South Staffordshire District Council election (New ward boundaries & district boundary changes also took place)
- 1995 South Staffordshire District Council election (District boundary changes took place but the number of seats remained the same)
- 1999 South Staffordshire District Council election
- 2003 South Staffordshire District Council election (New ward boundaries reduced the number of seats by one)
- 2007 South Staffordshire District Council election
- 2011 South Staffordshire District Council election
- 2015 South Staffordshire District Council election
- 2019 South Staffordshire District Council election
- 2023 South Staffordshire District Council election (New ward boundaries)

== Election results ==
	Overall control	Conservative	Labour	Lib Dems	Green	Freedom	UKIP	Independent
2023	Conservative	29	2	4	2	0	0	4
2019	Conservative	37	1	0	3	0	1	7
2015	Conservative	43	1	0	0	0	1	4
2011	Conservative	42	2	0	0	0	0	5
2007	Conservative	42	1	1	0	0	0	5
2003	Conservative	35	8	1	0	1	0	4

== Results maps ==
2003 results map

2007 results map

2011 results map

2015 results map

2019 results map

2023 results map

== By-election results ==
=== 1995-1999 ===
Bilbrook By-Election 25 July 1996
Party	Candidate	Votes	%	±%
Conservative		420	49.5	
Liberal Democrats		216	25.5	
Labour		212	25.0	
Majority		204	24.0	
Turnout		848		
Conservative hold		Swing		

=== 1999-2003 ===
Shareshill By-Election 7 March 2002
Party	Candidate	Votes	%	±%
Independent		321	65.4	−1.4
Conservative		170	34.6	+21.6
Majority		151	30.8	
Turnout		491	30.0	
Independent gain from Conservative		Swing		

Codsall South By-Election 30 May 2002
Party	Candidate	Votes	%	±%
Conservative		575	82.4	+19.2
Labour		123	17.6	+2.8
Majority		452	64.8	
Turnout		698	24.0	
Conservative hold		Swing		

Cheslyn Hay By-Election 24 October 2002
Party	Candidate	Votes	%	±%
Labour		unopposed		
Labour gain from Independent		Swing		

=== 2003-2007 ===
Great Wyrley Town By-Election 3 November 2005
Party	Candidate	Votes	%	±%
Conservative	Brian Bates	395	55.2	−5.5
Labour	John Jones	320	44.8	+5.5
Majority		75	10.4	
Turnout		715		
Conservative hold		Swing		

=== 2007-2011 ===
Huntington and Hatherton By-Election 1 July 2010
Party	Candidate	Votes	%	±%
Conservative	David Williams	237	44.2	−10.3
Labour	Ron Kenyon	235	43.8	−1.7
Independent	David Percox	64	11.9	+11.9
Majority		2	0.4	
Turnout		536		
Conservative hold		Swing		

=== 2011-2015 ===
Huntington and Hatherton By-Election 6 December 2012
Party	Candidate	Votes	%	±%
Conservative	Barry Bond	404	59.3	−6.2
UKIP	Lyndon Jones	182	26.7	−7.8
Labour	John Brindle	95	14.0	+14.0
Majority		222	32.6	
Turnout		681		
Conservative hold		Swing		

Perton East By-Election 14 February 2013
Party	Candidate	Votes	%	±%
Independent	Anthony Bourke	314	65.1	+16.9
Conservative	Nigel Caine	168	34.9	−16.9
Majority		146	30.2	
Turnout		482		
Independent gain from Conservative		Swing		

Brewood and Coven By-Election 10 October 2013
Party	Candidate	Votes	%	±%
Conservative	Wendy Sutton	459	40.8	−3.7
Labour	Lorna Jones	352	31.3	+6.4
UKIP	Christopher Lenton	225	20.0	+20.0
Independent	Moira Alden-Court	89	7.9	+7.9
Majority		107	9.5	
Turnout		1,125		
Conservative hold		Swing		

=== 2015-2019 ===
Great Wyrley Town By-Election 21 July 2016
Party	Candidate	Votes	%	±%
Conservative	Mike Lawrence	357	50.9	+1.1
Labour	George Bullock	230	32.8	+5.5
UKIP	Malcolm McKenzie	114	16.3	−6.7
Majority		127	18.1	
Turnout		701		
Conservative hold		Swing		

Penkridge West By-Election 4 May 2017
Party	Candidate	Votes	%	±%
Conservative	Josephine Chapman	357	57.4	−2.7
Labour	Andrew Lenz	101	16.2	+16.2
Independent	David Oldfield	99	15.9	−24.0
Independent	Victor Kelly	39	6.3	+6.3
Green	Ian Sadler	15	2.4	+2.4
Independent	Norman Smallwood	11	1.8	+1.8
Majority		256	41.2	
Turnout		622		
Conservative hold		Swing		

Codsall South By-Election 8 February 2018
Party	Candidate	Votes	%	±%
Conservative	Bob Spencer	490	78.8	N/A
Labour	Kevin McElduff	82	13.2	N/A
Green	Ian Sadler	50	8.0	N/A
Majority		408	65.6	
Turnout		622		
Conservative hold		Swing		

=== 2019-2023 ===
Kinver By-Election 28 October 2021
Party	Candidate	Votes	%	±%
Conservative	Geoff Sisley	865	74.1	+29.4
Labour	Michael Vaughan	154	13.2	+13.2
Green	Bernadette McGourty	149	12.8	−16.3
Majority		711	60.9	
Turnout		1,168		
Conservative hold		Swing		

Wombourne South East By-Election 28 October 2021
Party	Candidate	Votes	%	±%
Conservative	Mark Evans	370	50.3	−22.7
Green	Claire McIlvenna	323	43.9	+43.9
Labour	Denis Beaumont	42	5.7	−21.3
Majority		47	6.4	
Turnout		735		
Conservative hold		Swing		

Penkridge North East and Acton Trussell By-Election 21 July 2022
Party	Candidate	Votes	%	±%
Conservative	Andy Adams	388	47.8	N/A
Liberal Democrats	Sam Harper-Wallis	378	46.6	N/A
Labour	Norman Smallwood	45	5.5	N/A
Majority		10	1.2	
Turnout		811		
Conservative hold		Swing		

=== 2023-2027 ===
Great Wyrley Landywood By-Election 26 June 2025
Party	Candidate	Votes	%	±%
Conservative	Joe Hill	358	48.7	+9.1
Reform	Craig Humphreyson	292	39.7	+39.7
Labour	Jan Jeffries	55	7.5	−30.3
Green	Danni Braine	30	4.1	−4.9
Majority		66	9.0	
Turnout		735		
Conservative hold		Swing		

Himley and Swindon By-Election 16 July 2026
Party	Candidate	Votes	%	±%
Conservative	Joe Hill	298	43.2	−21.0
Reform	Nigel Caine	187	27.1	+27.1
Independent	Richard Painter	129	18.7	+18.7
Labour	Denis Beaumont	28	4.1	+4.1
Green	Bhanu Dhir	22	3.2	+3.2
Independent	Gordon Fanthom	16	2.3	−12.1
Liberal Democrats	Michael Jones	10	1.4	−20.1
Majority		111	16.1	
Turnout		690		
Conservative hold		Swing		

Wombourne North By-Election 24 September 2026
Party	Candidate	Votes	%	±%
Conservative	Elizabeth Keeling	864	50.1	+8.1
Reform	Marie Shortland	645	37.4	+37.4
Labour	Anil Singh	115	6.7	−12.3
Green	Claire McIlvenna	68	3.9	−16.1
Liberal Democrats	Michael Jones	33	1.9	−7.3
Majority		219	12.7	
Turnout		1,725		
Conservative hold		Swing		

Huntington and Hatherton By-Election 19 November 2026
Party	Candidate	Votes	%	±%
Reform	Craig Humphreyson	370	53.2	+53.2
Conservative	Nathaniel Williams	171	24.6	−13.0
Labour	Daniel Costigan	155	22.3	−17.9
Majority		199	28.6	
Turnout		696		
Reform gain from Labour		Swing		
