= 2023 South Staffordshire District Council election =

2023 South Staffordshire District Council
- 4 May 2023

All 42 seats to South Staffordshire District Council 22 seats needed for a majority

	First party	Second party	Third party
Leader	Roger Lees	Bob Cope
Party	Conservative	Independent	Liberal Democrats
Last election	37 seats, 57.4%	7 seats, 14.6%	0 seats, 1.7%
Seats before	36	8 (Note: Including one vacant seat in Featherstone and Shareshill ward previously held by independent councillor Frank Beardsmore prior to his resignation in January 2023.)	0
Seats won	29	5	4
Seat change	▼8	▼2	▲4
Popular vote	24,653	5,391	7,311
Percentage	47.1%	10.3%	14.0%
Swing	▼10.3%	▼4.3%	▲12.3%
	Fourth party	Fifth party	Sixth party
Leader		Chris Benton (defeated)
Party	Labour	Green	UKIP
Last election	1 seat, 13.7%	3 seats, 11.0%	1 seat, 1.7%
Seats before	1	3	1
Seats won	2	2	0
Seat change	▲1	▼1	▼1
Popular vote	10,410	3,915	389
Percentage	19.9%	7.5%	0.7%
Swing	▲6.2%	▼3.5%	▼1.0%
- Winner of each seat at the 2023 South Staffordshire District Council election
Leader before election
Roger Lees
Conservative
Leader after election
Roger Lees
Conservative

The 2023 South Staffordshire District Council election took place on 4 May 2023 to elect all 42 councillors on South Staffordshire District Council in Staffordshire, England. This was on the same day as other local elections across England. New ward boundaries came into effect for this election, reducing the number of seats from 49 to 42.

The Conservatives, who have held a majority of the seats on the council since 1976, retained their majority at this election, winning 29 of the 42 seats.

== Summary ==
=== Election result ===
2023 South Staffordshire District Council election
Party	Candidates	Seats	Gains	Losses	Net gain/loss	Seats %	Votes %	Votes	+/−
Conservative	39	29	N/A	N/A	▼8	69.0	47.1	24,653	–10.3
Independent	16	5	N/A	N/A	▼2	11.9	10.3	5,391	–4.3
Liberal Democrats	13	4	N/A	N/A	▲4	9.5	14.0	7,311	+12.3
Labour	26	2	N/A	N/A	▲1	4.8	19.9	10,410	+6.2
Green	13	2	N/A	N/A	▼1	4.8	7.5	3,915	–3.5
UKIP	2	0	N/A	N/A	▼1	0.0	0.7	389	–1.0
Heritage	1	0	N/A	N/A	Steady	0.0	0.4	208	N/A
Freedom Alliance (UK)	1	0	N/A	N/A	Steady	0.0	0.2	95	N/A

== Ward results ==
The results for each ward were as follows, with an asterisk (*) indicating an incumbent councillor standing for re-election.

=== Bilbrook ===
Bilbrook
Party	Candidate	Votes	%	±%
Green	Gary Burnett*	866	71.4	N/A
Green	Fiona Hopkins	802	66.1	N/A
Conservative	Paul Armitage	341	28.1	N/A
Conservative	Ryan Hillback	280	23.1	N/A
Turnout		1,213	31.8	
Green win (new seat)				
Green win (new seat)				

=== Brewood, Coven and Blymhill ===
Brewood, Coven and Blymhill
Party	Candidate	Votes	%	±%
Conservative	Anne Holmes*	1,109	54.9	N/A
Conservative	Wendy Sutton*	1,055	52.2	N/A
Conservative	Sue Szalapski	931	46.1	N/A
Labour	Adrian Hamlyn	690	34.1	N/A
Labour	Adebowale Olojede	625	30.9	N/A
Liberal Democrats	Valerie Davis	432	21.4	N/A
Green	Nirmaljit Singh	396	19.6	N/A
Turnout		2,032	30.7	
Conservative win (new seat)				
Conservative win (new seat)				
Conservative win (new seat)				

=== Cheslyn Hay Village ===
Cheslyn Hay Village
Party	Candidate	Votes	%	±%
Conservative	Rob Duncan	620	38.9	N/A
Conservative	Sue Duncan	611	38.3	N/A
Conservative	Bernard Williams*	565	35.4	N/A
Labour	Alex Brindle	543	34.0	N/A
Labour	Adam Freeman	457	28.7	N/A
Independent	Dave Lockley*	447	28.0	N/A
Labour	Anil Singh	400	25.1	N/A
Independent	David Norris	369	23.1	N/A
UKIP	Steve Hollis*	229	14.4	N/A
UKIP	Alan Emery	160	10.0	N/A
Turnout		1,599	26.7	
Conservative win (new seat)				
Conservative win (new seat)				
Conservative win (new seat)				

=== Codsall ===
Codsall
Party	Candidate	Votes	%	±%
Conservative	Val Chapman	1,164	56.2	N/A
Conservative	Meg Barrow*	1,152	55.6	N/A
Conservative	John Michell*	1,044	50.4	N/A
Labour	Chris Fewtrell	748	36.1	N/A
Labour	Reg Vernon	731	35.3	N/A
Liberal Democrats	Gulvinder Bansal	526	25.4	N/A
Turnout		2,091	33.2	
Conservative win (new seat)				
Conservative win (new seat)				
Conservative win (new seat)				

=== Essington ===
Essington
Party	Candidate	Votes	%	±%
Independent	Warren Fisher*	647	74.4	N/A
Independent	Chris Steel*	566	65.1	N/A
Conservative	Ash Smith	238	27.4	N/A
Turnout		873	21.6	
Independent win (new seat)				
Independent win (new seat)				

=== Featherstone, Shareshill and Saredon ===
Featherstone, Shareshill and Saredon
Party	Candidate	Votes	%	±%
Independent	Bob Cope*	800	62.3	N/A
Labour	John Brindle	494	38.4	N/A
Conservative	Hilary Southern	439	34.2	N/A
Liberal Democrats	Margaret Pincher	153	11.9	N/A
Turnout		1,292	29.6	
Independent win (new seat)				
Labour win (new seat)				

=== Great Wyrley Landywood ===
Great Wyrley Landywood
Party	Candidate	Votes	%	±%
Conservative	Ray Perry*	366	44.2	N/A
Conservative	Kath Williams*	361	43.6	N/A
Labour	Wayne Instone	349	42.1	N/A
Labour	Paul Alexander	275	33.2	N/A
Independent	David Norris	126	15.2	N/A
Green	James Sadler	83	10.0	N/A
Turnout		835	21.5	
Conservative win (new seat)				
Conservative win (new seat)				

=== Great Wyrley Town ===
Great Wyrley Town
Party	Candidate	Votes	%	±%
Conservative	Kath Perry*	654	60.6	N/A
Conservative	Matthew Jackson	585	54.2	N/A
Labour	John Jones	449	41.6	N/A
Labour	Brian Levy	327	30.3	N/A
Turnout		1,090	26.3	
Conservative win (new seat)				
Conservative win (new seat)				

=== Himley and Swindon ===
Himley and Swindon
Party	Candidate	Votes	%	±%
Conservative	Roger Lees*	380	64.2	N/A
Liberal Democrats	Keith Pincher	127	21.4	N/A
Independent	Gordon Fanthom	85	14.4	N/A
Majority		253	42.8	
Turnout		592	28.7	
Conservative win (new seat)				

=== Huntington and Hatherton ===
Huntington and Hatherton
Party	Candidate	Votes	%	±%
Labour	Jeff Ashley	364	46.8	N/A
Conservative	David Williams*	340	43.8	N/A
Labour	Ron Kenyon	246	31.7	N/A
Green	Chris Benton*	201	25.9	N/A
Green	Adam Dent	77	9.9	N/A
Turnout		785	19.9	
Labour win (new seat)				
Conservative win (new seat)				

=== Kinver and Enville ===
Kinver and Enville
Party	Candidate	Votes	%	±%
Liberal Democrats	Stephanie Dufty	1,416	59.0	N/A
Liberal Democrats	Paul Harrison	1,375	57.3	N/A
Liberal Democrats	Greg Spruce	1,188	49.5	N/A
Conservative	Geoff Sisley*	848	35.4	N/A
Conservative	Roger Pauli	783	32.7	N/A
Conservative	Sion Charlesworth-Jones	733	30.6	N/A
Labour	Julia Southall	235	9.8	N/A
Freedom Alliance	Jackie Ward	95	4.0	N/A
Turnout		2,408	38.1	
Liberal Democrats win (new seat)				
Liberal Democrats win (new seat)				
Liberal Democrats win (new seat)				

=== Lapley, Stretton and Wheaton Aston ===
Lapley, Stretton and Wheaton Aston
Party	Candidate	Votes	%	±%
Independent	Rob Nelson	302	39.3	N/A
Conservative	Mark Sutton	245	31.9	N/A
Independent	Jeff Ford	174	22.7	N/A
Green	Hilde Liesens	47	6.1	N/A
Majority		57	7.4	
Turnout		768	36.4	
Independent win (new seat)				

=== Pattingham, Trysull, Bobbington and Lower Penn ===
Pattingham, Trysull, Bobbington and Lower Penn
Party	Candidate	Votes	%	±%
Conservative	Victoria Wilson*	726	49.1	N/A
Conservative	Robert Reade*	666	45.1	N/A
Independent	Steve Bull	415	28.1	N/A
Labour	Nicholas Hill	272	18.4	N/A
Green	Holly Fuller	247	16.7	N/A
No Description	Ben Forrest	216	14.6	N/A
Liberal Democrats	Amanda Young	99	6.7	N/A
Liberal Democrats	Andy Calloway	74	5.0	N/A
Turnout		1,487	37.8	
Conservative win (new seat)				
Conservative win (new seat)				

=== Penkridge North and Acton Trussell ===
Penkridge North and Acton Trussell
Party	Candidate	Votes	%	±%
Liberal Democrats	Sam Harper-Wallis	930	57.7	N/A
Conservative	Andy Adams*	729	45.3	N/A
Liberal Democrats	Luana Bills	689	42.8	N/A
Conservative	Len Bates*	566	35.1	N/A
Turnout		1,620	37.1	
Liberal Democrats win (new seat)				
Conservative win (new seat)				

=== Penkridge South and Gailey ===
Penkridge South and Gailey
Party	Candidate	Votes	%	±%
Conservative	Helen Adams	597	48.0	N/A
Conservative	Victor Kelly	585	47.1	N/A
Labour	Andrew Lenz	452	36.4	N/A
Labour	Norman Smallwood	423	34.0	N/A
No Description	Viv Smith	278	22.4	N/A
Turnout		1,249	28.2	
Conservative win (new seat)				
Conservative win (new seat)				

=== Perton East ===
Perton East
Party	Candidate	Votes	%	±%
Independent	Penny Allen*	464	67.4	N/A
Conservative	Judith Evans	224	32.6	N/A
Majority		240	34.8	
Turnout		688	34.4	
Independent win (new seat)				

=== Perton Lakeside ===
Perton Lakeside
Party	Candidate	Votes	%	±%
Conservative	Rita Heseltine*	354	42.7	N/A
Conservative	Christopher Evans	335	40.4	N/A
Independent	Alita Caine	250	30.1	N/A
Labour	Mary Thomas	215	25.9	N/A
Labour	Frank Thomas	212	25.5	N/A
Independent	Nigel Caine*	191	23.0	N/A
Turnout		836	23.7	
Conservative win (new seat)				
Conservative win (new seat)				

=== Perton Wrottesley ===
Perton Wrottesley
Party	Candidate	Votes	%	±%
Conservative	Phil Davis*	388	57.7	N/A
Labour	Dimple O’Gorman	128	19.0	N/A
Independent	Sam Payne	108	16.0	N/A
Green	Danni Braine	49	7.3	N/A
Majority		260	38.7	
Turnout		673	28.8	
Conservative win (new seat)				

=== Wombourne North ===
Wombourne North
Party	Candidate	Votes	%	±%
Conservative	Dan Kinsey*	891	53.5	N/A
Conservative	Barry Bond*	813	48.8	N/A
Conservative	Martin Perry	680	40.8	N/A
Green	Ian Sadler*	425	25.5	N/A
Labour	Margaret Davidson	402	24.1	N/A
Labour	Chris Wood	342	20.5	N/A
Heritage	Richard Blaikie	208	12.5	N/A
Liberal Democrats	Claire Male	195	11.7	N/A
Green	Jon Thorpe	149	8.9	N/A
Liberal Democrats	Mark Middleton	107	6.4	N/A
Turnout		1,687	30.6	
Conservative win (new seat)				
Conservative win (new seat)				
Conservative win (new seat)				

=== Wombourne South ===
Wombourne South
Party	Candidate	Votes	%	±%
Conservative	Mike Davies*	819	55.9	N/A
Conservative	Mark Evans*	748	51.1	N/A
Conservative	Vince Merrick*	688	47.0	N/A
Labour	Denis Beaumont	419	28.6	N/A
Green	Claire McIlvenna	387	26.4	N/A
Labour	Vicky Boswell	318	21.7	N/A
Labour	Theresa Vaccaro	294	20.1	N/A
Green	Elizabeth Westlake	186	12.7	N/A
Turnout		1,482	26.1	
Conservative win (new seat)				
Conservative win (new seat)				
Conservative win (new seat)				

== Post-election changes ==
=== By-elections ===
==== Great Wyrley Landywood ====
A by-election was held on 26 June 2025 to fill a casual vacancy in the ward.

Great Wyrley Landywood by-election: 26 June 2025
Party	Candidate	Votes	%	±%
Conservative	Joe Hill	358	48.7	
Reform	Craig Humphreyson	292	39.7	
Labour	Jan Jeffries	55	7.5	
Green	Danni Braine	30	4.1	
Majority		66	9.0	
Turnout		735	18.0	
Conservative hold		Swing		

==== Himley & Swindon ====
Himley & Swindon by-election: 16 July 2026 Death of Roger Lees (Conservative)
Party	Candidate	Votes	%	±%
Conservative	Sean Massey	298	43.2	−26.6
Reform	Nigel Caine	187	27.1	N/A
Independent	Richard Painter	129	18.7	N/A
Labour	Denis Beaumont	28	4.1	N/A
Green	Bhanu Dir	22	3.2	N/A
Independent	Gordon Fanthom	16	2.3	−12.1
Liberal Democrats	Michael Jones	10	1.4	−20.0
Majority		111	16.1	−26.7
Turnout		690	32.4	+3.7
Conservative hold				

==== Wombourne North ====
Wombourne North by-election: 24 September 2026 Death of Barry Bond MBE (Conservative)
Party	Candidate	Votes	%	±%
Conservative	Elizabeth Keeling	864	50.1	+8.1
Reform	Marie Shortland	645	37.4	N/A
Labour	Anil Singh	115	6.7	−12.3
Green	Claire McIlvenna	68	3.9	−16.1
Liberal Democrats	Michael Jones	33	1.9	−7.3
Majority		219	12.7	N/A
Turnout		1731	31.2	+0.8
Conservative hold		Swing		

==== Huntington & Hatherton ====
Huntington & Hatherton by-election : 19 November 2026
Party	Candidate	Votes	%	±%
Labour	Daniel Costigan			
Reform	Craig Humphreyson			
Conservative	Nathaniel Williams			
Majority				
Turnout				
		Swing		
