= Listed buildings in Bobbington =

Bobbington is a civil parish in the district of South Staffordshire, Staffordshire, England. It contains eleven listed buildings that are recorded in the National Heritage List for England. Of these, two are at Grade II*, the middle of the three grades, and the others are at Grade II, the lowest grade. The parish contains the village of Bobbington, and is otherwise rural. The listed buildings consist of a church, houses and farmhouses with associated structures, farm buildings, and a cottage.

== Key ==
Grade	Criteria
II*	Particularly important buildings of more than special interest
II	Buildings of national importance and special interest

== Buildings ==
Name and location	Photograph	Date	Notes	Grade
Church of The Holy Cross; 52.51249°N 2.28415°W		12th century	The church was altered and extended during the following centuries, and in 1878 it was restored by Sir Arthur Blomfield. The church is built in sandstone with tile roofs, and consists of a nave with a vestry, a north aisle with a vestry, a chancel, and a southwest tower. The tower has three stages, pilaster buttresses, a south doorway, dentilled eaves, and a pyramidal roof. The north arcade is Norman, with round arches, cylindrical columns and scalloped capitals.	II*
Bobbington Hall; 52.50352°N 2.29251°W	—	Early 17th century	A farmhouse, later a private house, that was altered and extended in the 19th century, it is in red brick and has a tile roof with crow-stepped gables. There are two storeys and an attic, and it consists of a hall range of three bays, a gabled cross-wing to the right, a rear wing on the left, 19th-century extensions in the angle at the rear, and a single-storey 17th-century wing to the left with exposed timber framing. In the angle on the front is a two-storey porch with a segmental-headed doorway. The windows are mullioned and chamfered with hood moulds, and contain casements.	II
Hay Farmhouse; 52.49465°N 2.28955°W	—	Early 17th century	The farmhouse was extended in the 19th century, it has two storeys and attics, and a T-shaped plan. The early part forms a projecting gabled cross-wing, it is in stone on a brick coped plinth, and contains chamfered mullioned windows. The later part forms the main range, it has a dentilled eaves band, and contains casement windows with segmental heads. In the angle is a single-bay wing, and attached to it is a porch with a segmental-headed doorway.	II
Barn northeast of College Farm; 52.50014°N 2.29521°W	—	17th century	The barn is timber framed with weatherboarding, and has a tile roof. There is one storey and three bays, and it contains a central full-height barn door.	II
The Blakelands, wall, railings and gate 52.52182°N 2.26512°W		17th century	Most of the house dates from 1722, and incorporates the core of an earlier house. It is in red brick enclosing some timber framing, on a sandstone plinth, with a cornice above the ground floor, a moulded eaves course, and a hipped tile roof. The house has two storeys and a cellar, and an L-shaped plan consisting of a front range of seven bays, and a rear wing, and in the angle are three parallel ranges, containing the 17th-century material. The central doorway has pilasters and a semicircular pediment, most of the windows are sashes, and others are casements. The front garden is enclosed by brick walls and wrought iron railings, and there are square brick gate piers with ball finials.	II*
The Dower House; 52.50819°N 2.27456°W	—	17th century	The house was remodelled in about 1754, and renovated in the 20th century. It is in red brick with a dentilled eaves band, and a tile roof. There are two storeys and an attic, and three bays, the middle bay having a pedimented gable. The doorway has a cambered head and a hood mould, the windows on the front are casements, and at the rear are mullioned windows. On the roof is an octagonal cupola with a lead-covered dome, and semicircular arches with keystones, and at the rear is a stair turret with a crow-stepped gable.	II
Barn north of College Farm; 52.50014°N 2.29587°W	—	Late 17th century	The barn, originally a stable, is timber framed with brick infill on a brick plinth and with a tile roof. There is one storey and three bays, and it contains central full-height barn doors, and later inserted doors.	II
Bobbington House; 52.51092°N 2.28776°W	—	1695	A farmhouse, later a private house, in red brick with storey bands, and a tile roof. There are two storeys and an attic, a front range of three bays, and two parallel rear wings. The windows are casements, those in the ground floor with segmental heads, and on the front is a datestone.	II
Former coach house and stable, The Blakelands; 52.52208°N 2.26502°W		Early 18th century	The building is in red brick with a dentilled eaves band, a tile roof, one storey and a loft, and a single-storey extension to the left. It contains mullioned and transomed cross windows with segmental heads. There is a blocked carriage arch and doorway with inserted windows.	II
Three Chimneys; 52.49261°N 2.30551°W	—	Early 18th century	A red brick cottage with a dentilled eaves band and a tile roof. There is one storey and an attic and two bays. The doorway and the windows, which are casements, have segmental heads. To the left is a massive external chimney stack with three lozenge section shafts.	II
Leaton Hall; 52.50802°N 2.27336°W	—	18th century	A house that was remodelled in 1817 and is used for other purposes. It is in rendered red brick with a parapet band, a plain parapet, and a hipped tile roof. There are three storeys, a front of eight bays, and sides of five bays. In the centre is a Doric portico with paired columns. The windows are sashes, and there is a full-height stair window on the right side with Gothic glazing. On the left side is a bay window with a wrought iron balustrade.	II
