= Listed buildings in Saredon =

Saredon is a civil parish in the district of South Staffordshire, Staffordshire, England. It contains seven listed buildings that are recorded in the National Heritage List for England. All the listed buildings are designated at Grade II, the lowest of the three grades, which is applied to "buildings of national importance and special interest". The parish contains the villages of Great Saredon and Little Saredon, and the listed buildings consist of houses, farmhouses and farm buildings.

== Buildings ==
| Name and location | Photograph | Date | Notes |
|---|---|---|---|
| Little Saredon Manor; 52.66252°N 2.07940°W | — | Early 16th century | The house, which has a timber framed core, was altered in the 18th and 19th centuries, the outer walls were almost completely rebuilt in brick, and the roof is tiled. There are two storeys and an attic, and an H-shaped plan, with a one-bay central range, and gabled cross-wings, with one bay to the left, and two bays to the right. The porch in the angle has Tuscan columns and a pedimented gable, and the windows are casements, some with segmental heads. At the rear is a timber-framed projection containing the staircase. |
| Saredon Hall Farmhouse and Cowhouse; 52.67054°N 2.07085°W | | 16th century | The oldest part is the north part of the cowhouse. The farmhouse dates from the early 18th century, and it was considerably extended and re-orientated in the late 19th century. The buildings are in red brick with tile roofs. The south front of the farmhouse, dating from the 19th century, has two storeys, corner pilasters, a hipped roof, and three bays. The central doorway has a fanlight, and the windows have lintels with fluted keystones. The west front of the house has two storeys, a storey band, five bays, a blocked central door, and casement windows with segmental heads. The cowhouse to the left contains three-light mullioned windows. |
| High View Cottage, Farm Cottage and barn, Great Saredon; 52.67445°N 2.07442°W | | Late 16th century | The buildings, which have been altered and extended, consist of a house facing west, a cottage at right angles at the rear, and a barn at right angles to the rear of the cottage. They are timber framed with infill, repairs and extensions in brick, and have tile roofs. The house has two storeys and an attic, the upper storey jettied and with exposed timber framing. In the centre is a gabled porch, and the windows are casements, some with segmental heads. |
| Hilltop Cottages, Great Saredon; 52.67362°N 2.07378°W | — | Late 17th century | A house with a timber framed core, refaced in brown brick, with an eaves band, and a tile roof. There are two storeys and two bays. It has a central doorway, the windows are casements with segmental heads, and there is exposed timber framing in the left gable end. |
| Little Saredon Dairy Farmhouse; 52.66283°N 2.07808°W | — | Early 18th century | A red brick farmhouse with a storey band, a corbelled eaves cornice, and a tile roof. There are two storeys and an attic, and a T-shaped plan, with a main range of three bays, and two parallel rear wings. The central doorway has a segmental-headed fanlight and a bracketed hood, and the windows are casements with segmental heads. |
| Great Saredon Farmhouse; 52.67463°N 2.07609°W | | Early to mid 18th century | A red brick farmhouse with a dentilled parapet band, a coped parapet, and a tile roof. The main part has two storeys and an attic, and an L-shaped plan, with a front range of three bays and a rear wing. The central doorway has a panelled doorcase and a moulded architrave, and the windows are sashes with wedge lintels. Recessed to the left is a kitchen and dairy wing that has one storey and an attic, a dentilled eaves band, and a casement window. |
| Hilltop Farmhouse, Great Saredon; 52.67429°N 2.07397°W | — | Early 19th century | The farmhouse is in red brick with a hipped tile roof. There are three storeys and three bays. The central doorway has a moulded architrave, a rectangular fanlight, and a bracketed cornice hood. The windows are casements with mullions and transoms. |
