= 2011 South Staffordshire District Council election =

2011 UK local government election

Results of the 2011 South Staffordshire District Council election

The 2011 South Staffordshire District Council election to the South Staffordshire District Council took place on Thursday 5 May 2011. A total of 49 seats were up for election, 42 of which went to the Conservative Party, mirroring the 2007 elections.

== Election result ==
South Staffordshire District Council election, 2011
Party	Seats	Gains	Losses	Net gain/loss	Seats %	Votes %	Votes	+/−
Conservative	42	4	3		85.72%	61.23%	35,647	
Labour	2	1	0		4.09%	16.42%	9,564	
Labour Co-op	0	0	0		0%	0.70%	409	
Liberal Democrats	0	0	1		0%	4.94%	2,873	
UKIP	0	0	0		0%	4.94%	2,873	
Independent	5	2	3		10.21%	16.70%	9,724	

== Ward results ==
Billbrook Ward (2 councillors)
Party	Candidate	Votes	%	±%
Conservative	Val Chapman	848	33.16%	n/a
Labour Co-op	Kevin David McElduff	409	16%	n/a
Conservative	Sonja Marie Oatley	823	32.20%	−0.66%
Labour	Anthony Peter Wynne-Jones	478	18.70%	n/a
Majority		1,671	65%	−0.47%
Turnout		2,558	42.60%	+8.60%

Brewood and Coven Ward (3 councillors)
Party	Candidate	Votes	%	±%
Independent	Andy Ball	941	15.31%	−9%
Conservative	Ivor Clay	1,369	22.27%	−0.89%
Conservative	Michael Robert Hampson	1,193	19.40%	−2.54%
Conservative	Anne Holmes	1,221	19.86%	−1.46%
Labour	Lena Holmes	661	10.75%	0.33%
Labour	Lorna Elizabeth Jones	765	12.44%	n/a
Majority		3,783	61.52%	−3.10%
Turnout		6,150	44%	+6%

Cheslyn Hay North and Saredon Ward (2 councillors)
Party	Candidate	Votes	%	±%
Independent	Mike Boyle	431	19.78%	−5.32%
Labour	Alex John Brindle	325	14.91%	n/a
Conservative	Alita Ann Caine	388	17.80%	−8.02%
Conservative	Nigel Peter Caine	384	17.62%	−7.88%
UKIP	Ken Gould	242	11.11%	n/a
Labour	Mac Harris	410	18.81%	−4.84%
Majority		772	35.42%	−15.89%
Turnout		2,180	37%	+7%

Cheslyn Hay South Ward (2 councillors)
Party	Candidate	Votes	%	±%
Labour	Joseph Colin Davison	396	21.91%	+2.91%
Conservative	David Heseltine	443	24.51%	−0.98%
UKIP	Steve Hollis	245	13.56%	n/a
Independent	Ann Pugh	312	17.26%	n/a
Conservative	Bernard Williams	412	22.79%	−8.57%
Majority		855	47.29%	−9.61%
Turnout		1,808	37%	+6%

Codsall North Ward (2 councillors)
Party	Candidate	Votes	%	±%
Conservative	Pat Campbell	861	33.61%	−7.49%
Independent	John Evans	337	13.16%	−26.40%
Conservative	Matt Ewart	797	31.11%	n/a
Labour	Judith Marion Williams	308	12%	n/a
Labour	Trefor John Williams	259	10.11%	+1%
Majority		1,658	64.72%	−15.91%
Turnout		2,562	42%	+4%

Codsall South Ward (2 councillors)
Party	Candidate	Votes	%	±%
UKIP	Mike Lynch	377	13.65%	+0.65%
Conservative	Robert James Marshall	1,019	36.89%	−2.01%
Conservative	John Kirkland Michell	909	32.90%	−6.27%
Labour	Gemma Elizabeth Smith	254	9.20%	n/a
Labour	Pamela Wall	204	7.39%	n/a
Majority		1,928	69.78%	−8.32%
Turnout		2,763	46%	+8%

Essington Ward (1 councillor)
Party	Candidate	Votes	%	±%
Conservative	Barry Michael Bond	383	14.11%	n/a
Independent	David John Clifft	1,135	41.79%	+41.79%
Labour	Charlotte Jane Hale	307	11.31%	n/a
Independent	Wayne Anthony Thomas Whitehouse	483	17.79%	n/a
Conservative	Christine Margaret Young	408	15%	n/a
Majority		1,618	59.58%	+59.58%
Turnout		2,716	41%	+41%

Featherstone and Shareshill Ward (2 councillors)
Party	Candidate	Votes	%	±%
Independent	Frank William Beardsmore	536	22.69%	+3.40%
Labour	John Brindle	482	20.40%	+8.21%
Independent	Bob Cope	639	27%	−1%
Conservative	Mike Lawrence	475	20.10%	+4.49%
Labour	Philip David Light	231	9.78%	n/a
Majority		1,175	49.73%	+2.39%
Turnout		2,363	39%	11.20%

Great Wyrley Landywood Ward (2 councillors)
Party	Candidate	Votes	%	±%
Labour	Ken Bullock	453	19.60%	
Labour	John Christopher Jones	423	18.30%	−0.30%
UKIP	Glen Paul Keatley	179	7.75%	
Conservative	Ray Perry	611	26.43%	−4.18%
Conservative	Kath Williams	646	27.95%	−3.96%
Majority		1,257	54.37%	−8.15%
Turnout		2,312	33%	+5%

Great Wyrley Town Ward (3 councillors)
Party	Candidate	Votes	%	±%
Conservative	Brian Paul Bates	1,048	24.79%	0.76%
Conservative	Janet Ann Johnson	1,101	26.04%	−0.42%
Labour	Tom Lowe	537	12.70%	+2.96%
UKIP	Malcolm Keith McKenzie	361	8.54%	n/a
Conservative	Kath Perry	1,182	27.95%	−0.14%
Majority		3,331	78.77%	−1.33%
Turnout		4,229	36%	+4%

Himley and Swindon Ward (1 councillor)
Party	Candidate	Votes	%	±%
UKIP	Gordon Edward Fanthom	261	31.45%	
Conservative	Roger Lees	417	50.25%	
Independent	Keith Ian Pincher	152	18.32%	
Majority		417	50.25%	
Turnout		830	48.30%	

Huntington and Hatherton Ward (2 councillors)
Party	Candidate	Votes	%	±%
Labour	Jeff Ashley	537	33.53%	+9.04%
Labour	Ron Kenyon	496	30.97%	n/a
Conservative	David Williams	569	35.52%	+6.18%
Majority		1,033	64.49%	+15.80%
Turnout		1,602	30%	+6%

Kinver Ward (3 councillors)
Party	Candidate	Votes	%	±%
Conservative	Brian Robert Edwards	1,659	26.98%	+2.61%
Conservative	Lin Hingley	1,655	26.91%	n/a
Independent	Ena Doreen Ray	1,071	17.41%	−3.06%
Labour	Christine Mary Ridgeway	644	10.47%	n/a
Conservative	Paul Arthur Wooddisse	1,122	18.24%	n/a
Majority		4,436	72.12%	+11.29%
Turnout		6,151	45%	+7%

Pattingham and Patshull Ward (1 councillor)
Party	Candidate	Votes	%	±%
Independent	Stephanie Brindle	120	13.20%	n/a
Conservative	Joan Millicent Burton	789	86.80%	+86.80%
Majority		789	86.80%	+86.80%
Turnout		909	50%	+50%

Penkridge North East and Acton Trussell Ward (2 councillors)
Party	Candidate	Votes	%	±%
Conservative	Leonard Arthur Bates	811	33.39%	n/a
Independent	Bevan Craddock	416	17.13%	n/a
Conservative	Isabel Ford	835	34.38%	+34.38%
Labour	Sandie Morris	367	15.11%	n/a
Majority		1,646	67.77%	+67.77%
Turnout		2,429	48.40%	+48.40%

Penkridge South East Ward (2 councillors)
Party	Candidate	Votes	%	±%
Labour	Vincent Thomas Brennan	474	19.68%	n/a
Independent	David John Oldfield	499	20.72%	n/a
Conservative	Christine Jane Raven	798	33.13%	−10.31%
Conservative	John Raven	638	26.49%	n/a
Majority		1,436	59.61%	−22.71%
Turnout		2,409	42%	+7%

Penkridge West Ward (1 councillor)
Party	Candidate	Votes	%	±%
Conservative	Donald Edwin Cartwright	370	53.95%	+53.95%
Labour	Sam Murphy	135	19.68%	
Independent	Calvert Stonehouse	181	26.39%	
Majority		370	53.95%	+53.95%
Turnout		686	41.5%	+41.5%

Perton Dippons Ward (1 councillor)
Party	Candidate	Votes	%	±%
Independent	Charlene Mary Ann Duffell	248	39.37%	n/a
Conservative	Keith James	382	60.64%	+39.37%
Majority		382	60.64%	+60.64%
Turnout		630	40.5%	+40.5%

Perton East Ward (1 councillor)
Party	Candidate	Votes	%	±%
Conservative	David John Billson	432	51.80%	−1.16%
Independent	Anthony Adam Christopher Bourke	402	48.20%	n/a
Majority		432	51.80%	−1.16%
Turnout		834	47.20%	+8.20%

Perton Lakeside Ward (3 councillors)
Party	Candidate	Votes	%	±%
Independent	Alan Keith Black	513	11.37%	−0.54%
Labour	John Fenby	418	9.27%	n/a
Conservative	David Michael Fereday	886	19.64%	+3.46%
Conservative	Rita Ann Helestine	850	18.84%	+2.35%
Independent	Angie James	592	13.13%	−1.01%
Conservative	Roy Edward Moreton	800	17.73%	+2.19%
Independent	Patricia Norah Pitt	453	10.04%	−3.01%
Majority		2,536	56.21%	−6.52%
Turnout		4,512	35.80%	+5.80%

Trysull and Seisdon (1 councillor)
Party	Candidate	Votes	%	±%
Independent	Neil David Compson	263	33.08%	n/a
Conservative	Robert James McCardle	532	66.92%	+66.92%
Majority		532	66.92%	+66.92%
Turnout		795	45.10%	+45.10%

Wheaton Aston, Bishops Wood and Lapley Ward (2 Councillors)
Party	Candidate	Votes	%	±%
Conservative	Brian Cox	unopposed		
Conservative	Roy Wright	unopposed		
Majority			100%	
Turnout				

Wombourne North and Lower Penn Ward (3 councillors)
Party	Candidate	Votes	%	±%
Conservative	Alan George Hinton	1,345	29.53%	+29.53%
UKIP	Lyndon Jones	707	15.52%	n/a
Conservative	Robert Frederick Reade	1,267	27.82%	+27.82%
Conservative	Joan Williams	1,236	27.14%	+27.14%
Majority		3,848	84.48%	−15.52%
Turnout		4,555	41.40%	+41.40%

Wombourne South East Ward (2 councillors)
Party	Candidate	Votes	%	±%
Conservative	Jackie Granger	860	38.50%	n/a
UKIP	Stuart Pace	501	22.42%	n/a
Conservative	Reginald Williams	873	39.08%	+4.73%
Majority		1,733	77.58%	+0.9%
Turnout		2,234	45.20%	+7.20%

Wombourne South West Ward (2 councillors)
Party	Candidate	Votes	%	±%
Conservative	Mary Bond	unopposed		
Conservative	Mike Davies	unopposed		
Majority			100%	
Turnout				
