= Listed buildings in Dunston, Staffordshire =

Dunston is a civil parish in the district of South Staffordshire, Staffordshire, England. It contains six listed buildings that are recorded in the National Heritage List for England. All the listed buildings are designated at Grade II, the lowest of the three grades, which is applied to "buildings of national importance and special interest". The parish contains the village of Dunston and an area to the west. The listed buildings consist of three farmhouses, a private house, a former stable block, and a church.

== Buildings ==
Name and location	Photograph	Date	Notes
Dunston Farmhouse; 52.76104°N 2.10809°W	—	c. 1700	A red brick farmhouse with a moulded eaves cornice and a hipped tile roof. There are two storeys and an attic, and three bays. In the centre is a Tuscan portico and a doorway with a rectangular fanlight, and the windows are sashes.
The Toft; 52.76353°N 2.14312°W	—	c. 1700	A farmhouse, later a private house, it is in red brick with a floor band, a moulded eaves cornice, and a tile roof. There are two storeys and a T-shaped plan, consisting of a main range of four bays and a rear wing. On the front is a porch with fluted pilasters, a fanlight, and an open pediment. To the right is a two-storey canted bay window, and the other windows are casements with segmental heads.
Former stable block, Dunston Hall; 52.75637°N 2.10831°W	—	Late 18th century	The stable block, which has been altered and extended and used for other purposes, is stuccoed with pilaster strips dividing the bays, and a hipped tile roof. It consists of a stable range with a saddle room to the left, and a later garage wing to the right, forming an L-shaped plan. The stable range has two storeys and seven bays, the middle bay wider and with a pediment containing a clock. In the ground floor is an entrance above which is a Diocletian window. The outer bays contain casement windows in cast iron frames, in the ground floor with semicircular heads, and in the upper floor with segmental heads. In the centre of the roof is a cupola with a lead-covered dome. The saddle room has one storey, three bays, and a hipped roof surmounted by a louvre. In the centre is a doorway with a rectangular fanlight and a segmental head, and the windows are casements with semicircular heads.
Dunston House; 52.75861°N 2.10791°W	—	Late 18th century	A red brick house with sill bands, a hipped slate roof, and three storeys. The north front has three bays, and contains a doorway with a Tuscan surround, a fanlight, and a pediment. To the left is an extension with one storey and an attic, containing a doorway and a hipped dormer. The east front has three bays, and contains a bay window, and the south front has four bays and a bay window. Most of the windows are sashes, some of which are tripartite.
Hay House Farmhouse; 52.75099°N 2.13758°W	—	c. 1800	A red brick farmhouse, it has banded eaves and a tile roof. There are three storeys and three bays. The central doorway has pilasters, a rectangular fanlight and a bracketed hood. The windows are casements with segmental heads.The former moated site on which the farmhouse stands is a Scheduled Monument.
St Leonard's Church; 52.75733°N 2.10836°W		1876–78	The church is built in stone with tile roofs, and consists of a nave, a chancel, north and south chapels, and a west steeple. The steeple has a tower with three stages, diagonal buttresses, a west door with a pointed arch and a hood mould ending in carved heads, above which is a niche containing the effigy of a saint. At the top is an embattled parapet with crocketed pinnacles and a recessed spire. The windows contain Geometrical tracery.
