= Listed buildings in Shareshill =

Shareshill is a civil parish in the district of South Staffordshire, Staffordshire, England. It contains four listed buildings that are recorded in the National Heritage List for England. Of these, one is in Grade II*, the middle of the three grades, and the others are at Grade II, the lowest grade. The parish includes the village of Shareshill and the surrounding area. The listed buildings consist of a church, a farm building, a farmhouse and a house, both with associated structures.

== Key ==
Grade	Criteria
II*	Particularly important buildings of more than special interest
II	Buildings of national importance and special interest

== Buildings ==
Name and location	Photograph	Date	Notes	Grade
Barn, Home Farm; 52.65650°N 2.08652°W	—	15th century	The barn, which has been considerably altered, is timber framed with a north aisle, the outer walls have been almost completely replaced in brick, and the roof is tiled. There is one storey and five bays. On the south side are blocked barn doors and tiers of air vents.	II
Church of St. Mary and St. Luke; 52.65700°N 2.08368°W		15th or 16th century	The oldest part of the church is the tower, which is in stone and in Perpendicular style. The body of the church was built in about 1742, it is in red brick with stone dressings, and is in Georgian style. The church consists of a nave, a south porch, an apsidal chancel, and a west tower. The tower has diagonal buttresses, three stages, a west doorway, a circular sundial on the south side, a frieze of saltire crosses, and an embattled parapet with short corner finials. The body of the church is on a stone plinth, it has quoins, and the windows have semicircular arches, pilasters, keystones, and sills with aprons. Along the body of the church is a parapet with balustrading above the windows. The porch is bowed and has two pairs of Tuscan columns, a moulded cornice, and a balustraded parapet. At the east end is a Venetian window with Ionic colonettes.	II*
Manor Farmhouse, malthouse and railings 52.65683°N 2.08571°W	—	Early 17th century	The building was extended in the 18th century. The original part is timber framed with brick infill on a sandstone plinth, the extension is in red brick, and the roof is tiled. The buildings form an L-shaped plan, with the malthouse at right angles to the farmhouse. The farmhouse is timber framed with two storeys and a cellar, and has two bays, casement windows, and a doorway with a shaped head. The malthouse is in brick with dentilled eaves, and has windows with segmental heads. The garden is enclosed by cast iron railings.	II
Woodberry House, wall, railings and gate 52.65653°N 2.08354°W	—	18th century	The house, which was remodelled in about 1840, is in rendered red brick, with oversailing eaves, and a hipped slate roof. There are two storeys, and a U-shaped plan, with a front range of three bays, and two rear wings. In the centre is a small portico with cylindrical columns, and a doorway with a rectangular fanlight, and the windows are sashes with fluted keystones. The front garden is enclosed by a low brick wall with a cast iron gate and railings.	II
