= Saredon =

Civil parish in Staffordshire, England

Coordinates: 52.66681°N 2.07248°W

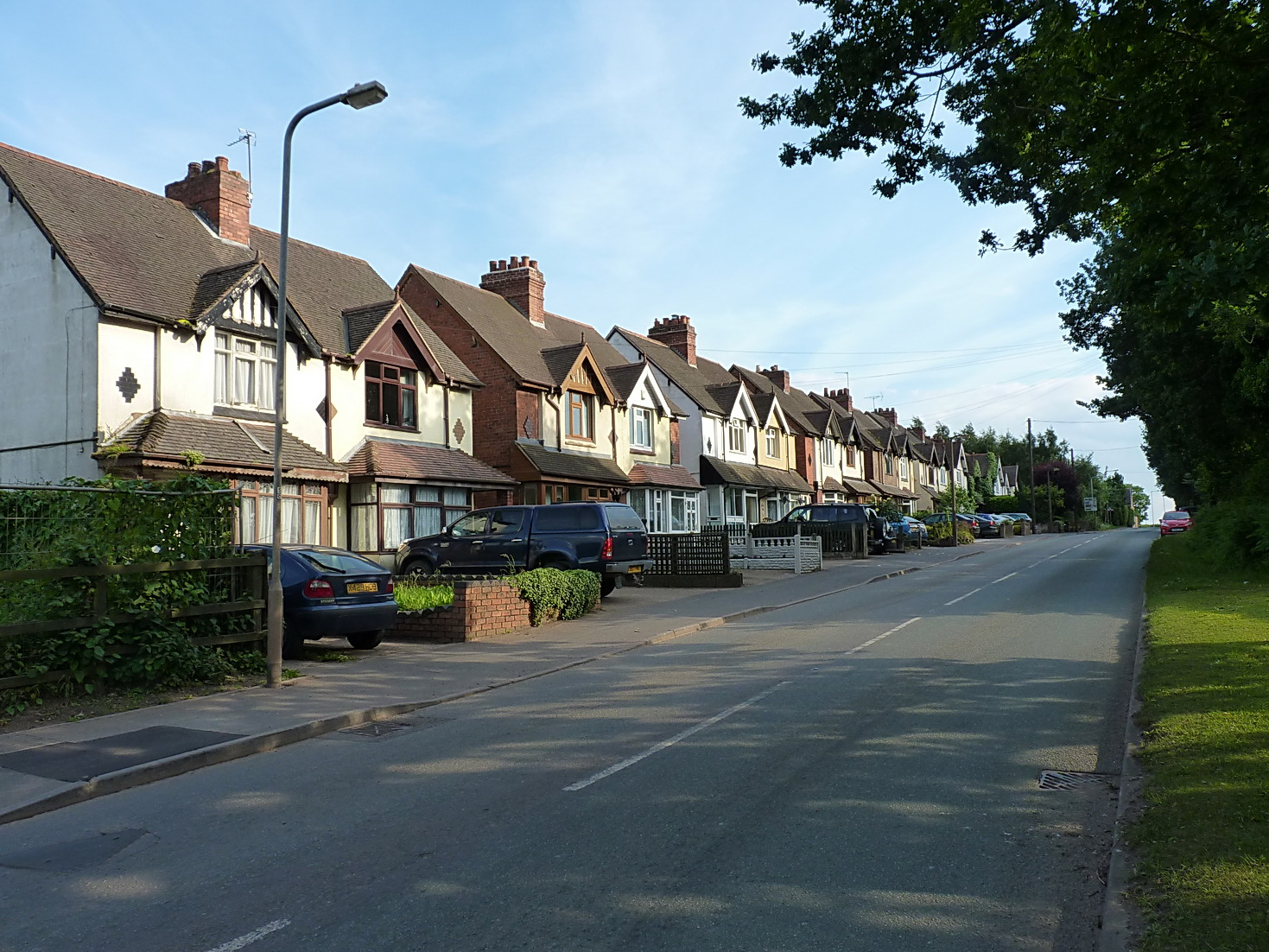
- Houses along Wolverhampton Road

- Location within Staffordshire
- Population: 829 (2011)
- OS grid reference: SJ951076
- District: South Staffordshire
- Shire county: Staffordshire
- Region: West Midlands
- Country: England
- Sovereign state: United Kingdom
- Post town: WOLVERHAMPTON
- Postcode district: WV10
- Dialling code: 01902
- Police: Staffordshire
- Fire: Staffordshire
- Ambulance: West Midlands
- UK Parliament: Stone, Great Wyrley and Penkridge

Saredon is a civil parish in South Staffordshire district, Staffordshire, England, situated to the north east of Wolverhampton, West Midlands, and to the south west of Cannock.

Formed from two hamlets, Little and Great Saredon, this parish lies south of the A5 and is bisected by the busy M6. The Saredon Brook, a tributary of the Penk, formerly known as that river's Cannock Heath branch, links the hamlets. This brook provided the energy for two powerful corn mills at Saredon and Deepmore, and was also renowned for the large number of trout it held.

There was also a windmill in the middle of Little Saredon, which remained in use until at least 1872, its working life thereafter being slightly prolonged through the use of a portable steam engine to drive the stones. In 1942, the remains of the sails were removed and the tower was converted into a house for the proprietor of Hawkins Tile Works in Cannock.

Little Saredon's other noteworthy feature was the disproportionately large number of yew trees that used to grow there. Great Saredon has a Roman tumulus on high ground, a quarter mile distant from, and facing, the A5. The estimated population in 2004 was 739.

== Saredon in 1851 ==
Saredon consists of two small hamlets, Great Saredon and Little Saredon, near the Cannock branch of the River Penk, which divides Saredon from Shareshill and also abounds in trout and other fish. The stream flows from Essington Woods and powers several large corn mills at Saredon and Deepmoor. A small independent Chapel was built here in 1840. Saredon contains 7 farmers, a maltster, a shopkeeper, 4 corn millers, a schoolmistress, a blacksmith, a shoemaker and a thrashing machine owner.

== See also ==
- Listed buildings in Saredon
