= Wolverhampton Airport =

Airport in Staffordshire, England

Wolverhampton Halfpenny Green Airport

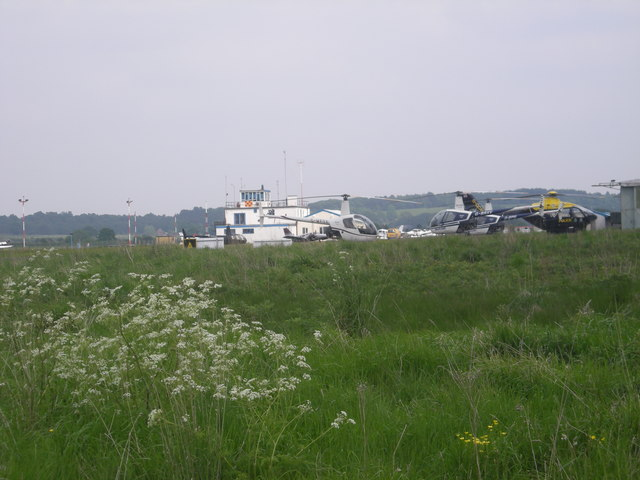
- IATA: XVW; ICAO: EGBO

Summary
- Airport type: Public
- Operator: Wolverhampton Airport Ltd.
- Serves: Wolverhampton
- Location: Bobbington, Staffordshire, England
- Elevation AMSL: 283 ft (86 m)
- Coordinates: 52°31′04″N 002°15′35″W

Map
- Location in Staffordshire

Runways
Direction	Length		Surface
Direction	m	ft	Surface
04/22	635	2,083	Asphalt
10/28	1,090	3,576	Asphalt
16/34	1,195	3,921	Asphalt
- Sources: UK AIP at NATS

Wolverhampton Halfpenny Green Airport (ICAO: EGBO), formerly Halfpenny Green Airport and Wolverhampton Business Airport, locally Bobbington Airport, is a small, 400-acre (1.6 km^{2}) airport situated near the village of Bobbington, Staffordshire, England. The airport is situated 8 mi (13 km) south-west of Wolverhampton, the city which it serves.

Wolverhampton Airport has a CAA Public Use Aerodrome Licence (Number P872) that allows flights for the public transport of passengers or for flying instruction.

== History ==
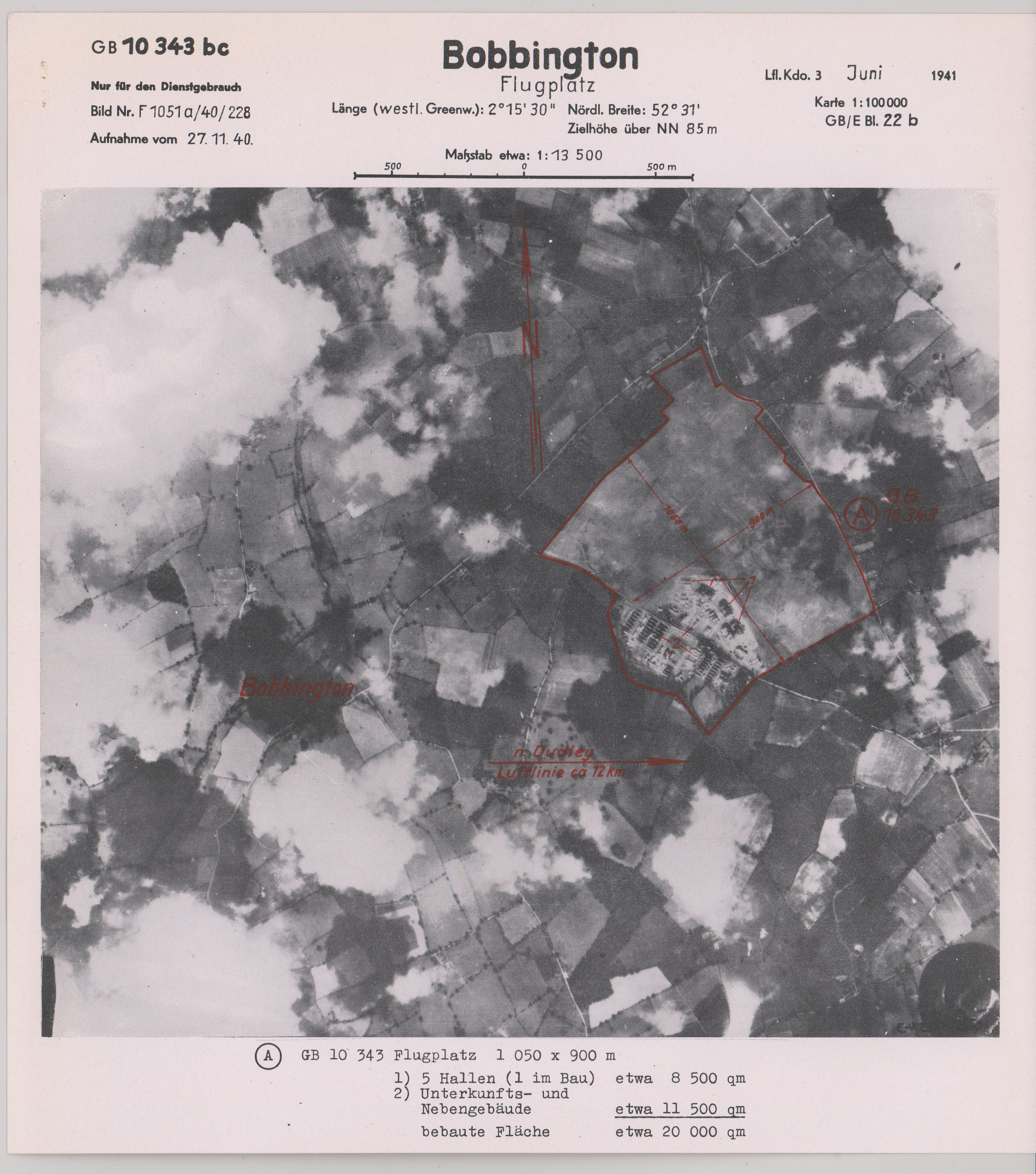
Wolverhampton Airport on a target dossier of the German Luftwaffe, 1941

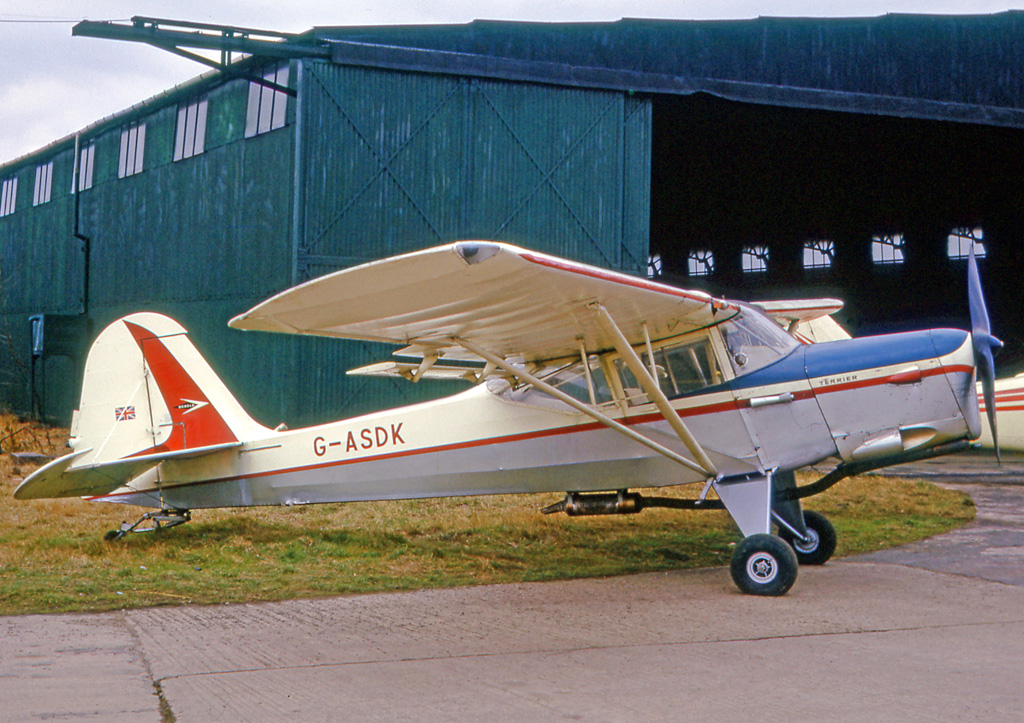
Wartime prefabricated Bellman hangar in civil use at Wolverhampton

=== World War II ===
The airfield was constructed between mid-1940 and early 1941 for use by the Royal Air Force, being initially named RAF Bobbington. The name was changed on 1 September 1943 to RAF Halfpenny Green, to avoid confusion with RAF Bovingdon in Hertfordshire. The first RAF unit to be based was No. 3 Air Observer & Navigator School which flew Blackburn Bothas and later Avro Ansons. The unit disbanded on 13 November 1945.

The 1945 film The Way to the Stars was set on a fictional RAF Halfpenny Field, but despite the similar name RAF Halfpenny Green was not used in any way for this film.

After a lengthy gap, flying at RAF Halfpenny Green resumed on 5 May 1952 by No. 2 Air Signallers School, again equipped with Avro Ansons, the unit disbanding on 13 September 1953. A ground-based equipment sub-unit of No. 25 Maintenance Unit occupied much of the airfield from 1 March 1946 until 15 November 1956. Following closure of this unit, the airfield lay disused for several years before civil aviation use commenced in 1961.

The following units were also here at some point:

- No. 3 Air Observer School RAF
- No. 3 (Observers) Advanced Flying Unit RAF
- No. 1545 (Beam Approach Training) Flight RAF
- No. 2795 Squadron RAF Regiment
- Pilot-Navigation Instructors Course

=== Recent developments ===
Wolverhampton Airport is located 5 mi (8 km) from the edge of the West Midlands conurbation and operates a number of general aviation services including facilities for private aircraft; business jets; helicopters; flying schools; and training and maintenance facilities.

The majority of aircraft operating from the airport are light aircraft, such as the single engine Cessna 182 and twin engine Piper PA-34 Seneca.

The small-airfield image the airport has retained was under threat until late 2006 as previous owner CityHopper Ltd had ambitious plans to expand the airport for airline usage, initially by up to 500,000 passengers a year which would necessitate construction of a new longer runway; plus intended open-air facilities to test jet engines for Boeing 737s. The Wolverhampton Airport Action Group is a local group which was set up in late 2002 to fight against the expansion.

New owner MAR Properties Ltd announced on 24 November 2006 that such plans had been dropped and it had no intention to expand to allow scheduled passenger services, its intention being to expand on the current general aviation and flying school activity which had been in steady decline at the airport since the late 1990s. MAR confirmed that the previously mooted runway extension was no longer necessary and had also been dropped from the plans.

The airfield is also becoming more popular with flex-wing and three-axis microlight pilots, and a microlight flight school has been on-site for some time. In support of short field operations, an unlicensed grass runway, measuring approx 355 m × 16 m (1,165 ft × 52 ft) has been provided which runs parallel to and to the left of Runway 28. As of January 2009, Runway 16/34 has high-intensity bidirectional edge lighting along its length (with low-intensity omnidirectional components) and high-intensity threshold and stop end lighting. Full precision approach path indicator (PAPI) lights are installed for both ends. Recent developments involve the potential of a GNSS Approach, which would allow aircraft to land in bad weather, without the need for expensive ILS equipment.

Up until 1 January 2016, the Central Counties Air Operations Unit police helicopter operated from Halfpenny Green. It was withdrawn under a rationalisation scheme operated by the National Police Air Service that would see air operations not being restricted to force boundaries and thus the availability of cross working when necessary.

== Incidents and accidents ==
- On 12 November 1943 a Royal Air Force, Handley Page Halifax Mk II (BB326) crashed shortly after taking off from Bobbington airfield due to a mechanical failure, killing seven of the eight crew.
- On 28 August 1972, a Piper Cherokee that was taking part in a race event, hit a tree, flipped over and crashed into an earthen bank outside the airfield's boundary. The pilot, Prince William of Gloucester, a cousin of Queen Elizabeth II, and his passenger were killed.
- On 30 April 2017, a de Havilland Vampire aircraft, participating in an airshow, damaged runway 10/28 during takeoff as its jet tore up some of the asphalt surface. The aircraft was unaffected and landed later on an alternate runway. Repairs to the surface were complete by 3 June.
- On 23 May 2017, a Piper PA-28 Cherokee Warrior II overshot the runway and collided with a tyre wall. The pilot and two passengers received minor injuries, the third passenger was unharmed.
