= 2007 South Staffordshire District Council election =

2007 UK local government election

Results of the 2007 South Staffordshire District Council election

The 2007 South Staffordshire District Council election to the South Staffordshire District Council took place on 3 May 2007, with the Featherstone and Shareshill Ward results delayed following the death of a candidate. All 49 seats were up for election, 41 of which went to Conservative Party candidates. 13 of the 14 seats won unopposed went to Conservatives.

== Election result ==
South Staffordshire District Council Election, 2007
Party	Seats	Gains	Losses	Net gain/loss	Seats %	Votes %	Votes	+/−
Conservative	41				83.68%	60.10%	24,125	
Labour	1				2.05%	16.83%	6,756	
Labour Co-op	0				0%	0%	0	
Liberal Democrats	1				2.05%	3.26%	1,309	
UKIP	0				0%	2.07%	833	
Independent	6				12.25%	17.72%	7,114	

== Ward results ==
Billbrook Ward (2 Councillors)
Party	Candidate	Votes	%	±%
Labour	John Gregory	400		
Conservative	Kenneth Mackie	698		
Conservative	Sonja Marie Oatley	703		
Labour	Joseph Tomlinson	339		
Majority		1,401	65.47%	
Turnout		2,140	34%	

Brewood and Coven Ward (3 Councillors)
Party	Candidate	Votes	%	±%
Independent	Andy Ball	1,128	24.31%	
Conservative	Ivor Clay	992	21.38%	
Conservative	Michael Robert Hampson	1,018	21.94%	
Conservative	Anne Holmes	989	21.32%	
Labour	Lena Holmes	514	11.08%	
Majority		2,999	64.62%	
Turnout		4,641	38%	

Cheslyn Hay North and Saredon Ward (2 Councillors)
Party	Candidate	Votes	%	±%
Labour	Mike Boyle	393	25.10%	
Conservative	Alita Ann Caine	405	25.82%	
Conservative	Nigel Peter Caine	400	25.50%	
Labour	Mac Harris	371	23.65%	
Majority		805	51.31%	
Turnout		1,569	30%	

Cheslyn Hay South Ward (2 Councillors)
Party	Candidate	Votes	%	±%
Independent	Bill Craddock	469	24.16%	
Labour	Joseph Colin Davison	369	19%	
Conservative	David Heseltine	495	25.49%	
Conservative	Bernard Williams	609	31.36%	
Majority		1,104	56.90%	
Turnout		1,942	31%	

Codsall North Ward (2 Councillors)
Party	Candidate	Votes	%	±%
Conservative	Pat Campbell	979	41.10%	
Independent	John Evans	943	39.56%	
Labour	Davyd Williams	245	10.28%	
Labour	Trefor John Williams	217	9.11%	
Majority		1,922	80.63%	
Turnout		2,384	38%	

Codsall South Ward (2 Councillors)
Party	Candidate	Votes	%	±%
UKIP	Mike Lynch	286	13%	
Conservative	Robert James Marshall	856	38.90%	
Conservative	John Kirkland Michell	862	39.17%	
Labour	Judith Williams	197	8.96%	
Majority		1,718	78.10%	
Turnout		2,201	38%	

Essington Ward (2 Councillors)
Party	Candidate	Votes	%	±%
Independent	David John Clifft	unopposed		
Conservative	Patricia Griffin	unopposed		
Majority			50%	
Turnout				

Featherstone and Shareshill Ward (2 Councillors)
Party	Candidate	Votes	%	±%
Independent	Frank William Beardsmore	383	19.29%	
Labour	Alex Brindle	168	8.46%	
Labour	John Brindle	242	12.19%	
Independent	Bob Cope	557	28%	
UKIP	Steve Hollis	115	5.79%	
Conservative	Mike Lawrence	310	15.61%	
Conservative	Jan Tate	211	10.63%	
Majority		940	47.34%	
Turnout		1,986	27.80%	

Great Wyrley Landywood Ward (2 Councillors)
Party	Candidate	Votes	%	±%
Labour	John Christopher Jones	373	18.60%	
Conservative	Ray Perry	614	30.61%	
Conservative	Kath Williams	640	31.91%	
Labour	Brian Wood	379	18.90%	
Majority		1,254	62.52%	
Turnout		2,006	28%	

Great Wyrley Town Ward (3 Councillors)
Party	Candidate	Votes	%	±%
Conservative	Brian Paul Bates	1,016	25.55%	
Conservative	Janet Ann Johnson	1,052	26.46%	
Labour	Jacqueline Lowe	405		
Labour	Tom Lowe	387	9.74%	
Conservative	Kath Perry	1,117	28.09%	
Majority		3,185	80.10%	
Turnout		3,977	32%	

Himley and Swindon Ward (1 Councillor)
Party	Candidate	Votes	%	±%
Conservative	Roger Lees	unopposed		
Majority			100%	
Turnout				

Huntington and Hatherton Ward (2 Councillors)
Party	Candidate	Votes	%	±%
Labour	Jeff Ashley	363	24.49%	
Labour	Lyndon Jones	326	21.99%	
Conservative	Patricia Williams	435	29.34%	
Labour	Frank Wilson	359	24.21%	
Majority		722	48.69%	
Turnout		1,483	24%	

Kinver Ward (3 Councillors)
Party	Candidate	Votes	%	±%
Conservative	Michael Davies	977	18.25%	
Conservative	Brian Robert Edwards	1,305	24.37%	
Liberal Democrats	James Gosling	1,002		
Conservative	Julian Hall	976	18.71%	
Independent	Ena Doreen Ray	1,096	20.47%	
Majority		3,258	60.83%	
Turnout		5,356	38%	

Pattingham and Patshull Ward (1 Councillor)
Party	Candidate	Votes	%	±%
Conservative	Joan Millicent Burton	unopposed		
Majority			100%	
Turnout				

Penkridge North East and Acton Trussell Ward (2 Councillors)
Party	Candidate	Votes	%	±%
Conservative	Isabel Ford	unopposed		
Conservative	Graham Spandler	unopposed		
Majority			100%	
Turnout				

Penkridge South East Ward (2 Councillors)
Party	Candidate	Votes	%	±%
Conservative	Roger Holt	811	38.88%	
Labour	Trudie McGuinness	369	17.69%	
Conservative	Christine Jane Raven	906	43.44%	
Majority		1,717	82.32%	
Turnout		2,086	35%	

Penkridge West Ward (1 Councillor)
Party	Candidate	Votes	%	±%
Conservative	Donald Edwin Cartwright	unopposed		
Majority			100%	
Turnout				

Perton Dippons Ward (1 Councillor)
Party	Candidate	Votes	%	±%
Conservative	Keith James	unopposed		
Majority			100%	
Turnout				

Perton East Ward (1 Councillor)
Party	Candidate	Votes	%	±%
Independent	Penny Allen	293	42.28%	
Conservative	David John Billson	367	52.96%	
Liberal Democrats	Albert Smith	33	4.77%	
Majority		367	52.96%	
Turnout		693	39%	

Perton Lakeside Ward (3 Councillors)
Party	Candidate	Votes	%	±%
Independent	Alan Keith Black	426	11.91%	
Independent	Anthony Bourke	537	15.01%	
Independent	Cyril Bromley	146	4.08%	
Independent	Pamela Bromley	163	4.56%	
Conservative	David Michael Fereday	579	16.18%	
Conservative	Rita Ann Helestine	590	16.49%	
Independent	Angie James	506	14.14%	
Labour	Kevin McElduff	165	4.62%	
Conservative	Roy Edward Moreton	556	15.54%	
Independent	Patricia Norah Pitt	467	13.05%	
Majority		2,245	62.73%	
Turnout		3,579	30%	

Trysull and Seisdon (1 Councillor)
Party	Candidate	Votes	%	±%
Conservative	Robert James McCardle	unopposed		
Majority			100%	
Turnout				

Wheaton Aston, Bishops Wood and Lapley Ward (2 Councillors)
Party	Candidate	Votes	%	±%
Conservative	Brian Cox	unopposed		
Conservative	Roy Wright	unopposed		
Majority			100%	
Turnout				

Wombourne North and Lower Penn Ward (3 Councillors)
Party	Candidate	Votes	%	±%
Conservative	Alan George Hinton	unopposed		
Conservative	Robert Frederick Reade	unopposed		
Conservative	Joan Williams	unopposed		
Majority			100%	
Turnout				

Wombourne South East Ward (2 Councillors)
Party	Candidate	Votes	%	±%
UKIP	Gordon Fanthom	432	23.33%	
Conservative	Carol Timms	784	42.34%	
Conservative	Reginald Williams	636	34.35%	
Majority		1,420	76.68%	
Turnout		1,852	38%	

Wombourne South West Ward (2 Councillors)
Party	Candidate	Votes	%	±%
Conservative	Mary Bond	633	37.55%	
Conservative	Betty Heath	604	35.83%	
Labour	Shirley Jones	175	10.38%	
Liberal Democrats	Ian Sadler	274	16.26%	
Majority		1,237	73.37%	
Turnout		1,686	27%	
