= 2019 South Staffordshire District Council election =

2019 UK local government election

- 2 May 2019

All 49 seats to South Staffordshire District Council 25 seats needed for a majority

	First party	Second party	Third party
Party	Conservative	Independent	Green
Last election	43 seats, 60.9%	4 seats, 14.4%	0 seats, 1.3%
Seats won	37	7	3
Seat change	▼6	▲3	▲3
Popular vote	23,348	5,947	4,471
Percentage	57.4%	14.6%	11.0%
Swing	▼3.5%	▲0.2%	▲9.7%
	Fourth party	Fifth party
Party	Labour	UKIP
Last election	1 seat, 17.8%	1 seat, 5.6%
Seats won	1	1
Seat change	Steady	Steady
Popular vote	5,578	680
Percentage	13.7%	1.7%
Swing	▼4.1%	▼3.9%
- Results of the 2019 South Staffordshire District Council election
Council control before election
Conservative
Council control after election
Conservative

The 2019 South Staffordshire District Council election took place on 2 May 2019 to elect members of the South Staffordshire District Council in England. It was held on the same day as other local elections.

== Summary ==
=== Election result ===
2019 South Staffordshire District Council election
Party	Candidates	Seats	Gains	Losses	Net gain/loss	Seats %	Votes %	Votes	+/−
Conservative	45	37	0	6	▼6	77.1	57.4	23,348	–3.5
Independent	11	7	3	0	▲3	14.6	14.6	5,947	+0.2
Green	11	3	3	0	▲3	6.3	11.0	4,471	+9.7
Labour	25	1	1	1	Steady	2.1	13.7	5,578	–4.1
UKIP	2	1	0	0	Steady	2.1	1.7	680	–3.9
Liberal Democrats	2	0	0	0	Steady	0.0	1.7	677	N/A

== Ward results ==
=== Bilbrook ===
Bilbrook
Party	Candidate	Votes	%	±%
Green	Gary Burnett	747	68.4	
Green	Ian Sadler	580	53.1	
Conservative	Valeria Chapman	419	38.4	
Conservative	Shane Jenkinson	293	26.8	
Turnout		1,098	34.0	
Green gain from Conservative				
Green gain from Conservative				

=== Brewood and Coven ===
Brewood and Coven
Party	Candidate	Votes	%	±%
Conservative	Joyce Bolton	1,011	62.3	
Conservative	Anne Holmes	1,009	62.1	
Conservative	Wendy Sutton	901	55.5	
Labour	Lorna Jones	462	28.4	
Green	James Sadler	436	26.8	
Labour	Antony Hyett	301	18.5	
Majority				
Turnout		1,650	30.7	
Conservative hold				
Conservative hold				
Conservative hold				

=== Cheslyn Hay North and Saredon ===
Cheslyn Hay North and Saredon
Party	Candidate	Votes	%	±%
UKIP	Stephen Hollis	394	46.4	
Labour	Mike Boyle	344	40.5	
Conservative	Victor Kelly	337	39.6	
Labour	Lee Booker	195	22.9	
Turnout		861	25.5	
UKIP hold				
Labour gain from Conservative				

=== Cheslyn Hay South ===
Cheslyn Hay South
Party	Candidate	Votes	%	±%
Conservative	Bernard Williams	369	45.4	
Conservative	Joseph Lockley	365	45.0	
UKIP	Albert Emery	286	35.2	
Labour	Joseph Davidson	184	22.7	
Labour	Matthew Plant	174	21.4	
Turnout		822	28.0	
Conservative hold				
Conservative hold				

=== Codsall North ===
Codsall North
Party	Candidate	Votes	%	±%
Conservative	Megan Barrow	628	62.8	
Conservative	James Ewart	595	59.5	
Green	Brigid O'Connor	292	29.2	
Labour	Luke Carpenter	215	21.5	
Turnout		1,017	30.5	
Conservative hold				
Conservative hold				

=== Codsall South ===
Codsall South
Party	Candidate	Votes	%	±%
Conservative	Robert Spencer	691	67.8	
Conservative	John Michell	625	61.3	
Green	Hilde Liesens	259	25.4	
Labour	David Jones	164	16.1	
Labour	Kevin McElduff	122	12.0	
Turnout		1,037	32.9	
Conservative hold				
Conservative hold				

=== Essington ===
Essington
Party	Candidate	Votes	%	±%
Independent	Warren Fisher	697	55.3	
Independent	Christopher Steel	641	50.9	
Independent	David Clifft	436	34.6	
Independent	Peter Lever	370	29.4	
Conservative	Malcolm McKenzie	167	13.3	
Turnout		1,265	32.0	
Independent hold				
Independent hold				

=== Featherstone and Shareshill ===
Featherstone and Shareshill
Party	Candidate	Votes	%	±%
Independent	Robert Cope	669	54.8	
Independent	Frank Beardsmore	663	54.3	
Conservative	Henryk Lobuczek	319	26.1	
Labour	John Brindle	260	21.3	
Majority				
Turnout		1,229	33.3	
Independent hold				
Independent gain from Conservative				

=== Great Wyrley Landywood ===
Great Wyrley Landywood
Party	Candidate	Votes	%	±%
Conservative	Kathleen Williams	522	67.4	
Conservative	Raymond Perry	512	66.1	
Labour	Susan Wood	222	28.6	
Labour	Adam Pearson	212	27.4	
Turnout		813	22.0	
Conservative hold				
Conservative hold				

=== Great Wyrley Town ===
Great Wyrley Town
Party	Candidate	Votes	%	±%
Conservative	Kathleen Perry	731	57.4	
Conservative	Janet Johnson	682	53.6	
Conservative	Michael Lawrence	541	42.5	
Independent	David Norris	357	28.0	
Labour	Ken Bullock	289	22.7	
Labour	John Jones	255	20.0	
Green	David Mermod	228	17.9	
Labour	Alex Brindle	226	17.8	
Turnout		1,291	25.5	
Conservative hold				
Conservative hold				

=== Himley and Swindon ===
Himley and Swindon
Party	Candidate	Votes	%	±%
Conservative	Roger Lees	350	58.3	
Independent	Gordon Fanthom	240	41.7	
Majority				
Turnout		598	28.6	
Conservative hold		Swing		

=== Huntington and Hatherton ===
Huntington and Hatherton
Party	Candidate	Votes	%	±%
Conservative	David Williams	393	36.3	
Green	Christopher Benton	358	33.0	
Labour	Jeff Ashley	331	30.6	
Turnout		847	21.3	
Conservative hold				
Green gain from Labour				

=== Kinver ===
Kinver
Party	Candidate	Votes	%	±%
Conservative	Linda Hingley	1,022	55.8	
Conservative	Brian Edwards	1,004	54.8	
Conservative	Henry Williams	889	48.6	
Green	Bernadette McGourty	665	36.3	
Liberal Democrats	Timothy Talbot-Webb	598	32.7	
Turnout		1,860	31.3	
Conservative hold				
Conservative hold				
Conservative hold				

=== Pattingham and Patshull ===
Pattingham and Patshull
Party	Candidate	Votes	%	±%
Conservative	Terence Mason	468	80.4	
Labour	Nicholas Hill	114	19.6	
Majority				
Turnout		602	33.7	
Conservative hold		Swing		

=== Penkridge North East and Acton Trussell ===
Penkridge North East and Acton Trussell
Party	Candidate	Votes	%	±%
Conservative	Len Bates	Unopposed		
Conservative	Isabel Ford	Unopposed		

=== Penkridge South East ===
Penkridge South East
Party	Candidate	Votes	%	±%
Conservative	Christine Raven	571	61.5	
Conservative	John Raven	529	56.9	
Labour	Norman Smallwood	330	35.5	
Labour	Andrew Lenz	318	34.2	
Turnout		966	27.4	
Conservative hold				
Conservative hold				

=== Penkridge West ===
Penkridge West
Party	Candidate	Votes	%	±%
Conservative	Josephine Chapman	373	78.7	
Labour	Ronald Kenyon	101	21.3	
Majority				
Turnout		502	28.7	
Conservative hold		Swing		

=== Perton Dippons ===
Perton Dippons
Party	Candidate	Votes	%	±%
Conservative	Philip Davis	Unopposed		

=== Perton East ===
Perton East
Party	Candidate	Votes	%	±%
Independent	Anthony Bourke	485	81.1	
Conservative	Richard Simonds	113	18.9	
Majority				
Turnout		602	36.2	
Independent hold		Swing		

=== Perton Lakeside ===
Perton Lakeside
Party	Candidate	Votes	%	±%
Independent	Penelope Allen	771	62.6	
Independent	Nigel Caine	618	50.2	
Conservative	Rita Heseltine	532	43.2	
Conservative	Christopher Evans	502	40.8	
Green	Jonathan Stokes	309	25.1	
Conservative	Natalie Neale	274	22.3	
Turnout		1,241	25.5	
Independent gain from Conservative				
Independent gain from Conservative				
Conservative hold				

=== Trysull and Seisdon ===
Trysull and Seisdon
Party	Candidate	Votes	%	±%
Conservative	Victoria Wilson	Unopposed		

=== Wheaton Aston, Bishopswood and Lapley ===
Wheaton Aston, Bishopswood and Lapley
Party	Candidate	Votes	%	±%
Conservative	Brian Cox	686	68.3	
Conservative	Venetia Jackson	685	68.2	
Labour	Barbara Sandland	247	24.6	
Turnout		1,046	32.1	
Conservative hold				
Conservative hold				

=== Wombourne North and Lower Penn ===
Wombourne North and Lower Penn
Party	Candidate	Votes	%	±%
Conservative	Barry Bond	813	62.0	
Conservative	Daniel Kinsey	771	58.8	
Conservative	Robert Reade	701	53.5	
Green	Holly Fuller	507	38.7	
Turnout		1,348	25.4	
Conservative hold				
Conservative hold				
Conservative hold				

=== Wombourne South East ===
Wombourne South East
Party	Candidate	Votes	%	±%
Conservative	Kenneth Upton	677	76.3	
Conservative	Reginald Williams	585	66.0	
Labour	Denis Beaumont	250	28.2	
Labour	Michael Vaughan	172	19.4	
Turnout		918	28.7	
Conservative hold				
Conservative hold				

=== Wombourne South West ===
The original poll in this ward, scheduled for 2 May 2019, was cancelled and rescheduled following the death of a candidate; the rescheduled election was held on 6 June 2019.

Wombourne South West: 6 June 2019
Party	Candidate	Votes	%	±%
Conservative	Mike Davies	359	38.1	
Conservative	Vince Merrick	325	34.5	
Green	Claire McIlvenna	90	9.5	
Liberal Democrats	Pete Stones	79	8.4	
Labour	Adam Freeman	47	5.0	
Labour	Michael Vaughan	43	4.6	
Turnout		955	18.0	
Conservative hold		Swing		
Conservative hold		Swing		

== Changes 2019–2023 ==
- Dave Lockley (Cheslyn Hay South), elected as a Conservative in 2019, left the party during the term and stood as an independent candidate at the 2023 election.

=== By-elections ===
==== Kinver ====
A by-election was held on 28 October 2021 to fill a casual vacancy in the ward.

Kinver: 28 October 2021
Party	Candidate	Votes	%	±%
Conservative	Geoff Sisley	865	74.1	
Labour	Michael Vaughan	154	13.2	
Green	Bernadette McGourty	149	12.8	
Majority		711	60.9	
Turnout		1,173	20.0	
Conservative hold		Swing		

==== Penkridge North East and Acton Trussell ====
A by-election was held on 21 July 2022 to fill a casual vacancy in the ward.

Penkridge North East and Acton Trussell: 21 July 2022
Party	Candidate	Votes	%	±%
Conservative	Andrew Adams	388	47.8	
Liberal Democrats	Samuel Harper-Wallis	378	46.6	
Labour	Norman Smallwood	45	5.5	
Majority		10	1.2	
Turnout		814	27.4	
Conservative hold		Swing		

==== Wombourne South East ====
A by-election was held on 28 October 2021 to fill a casual vacancy in the ward.

Wombourne South East: 28 October 2021
Party	Candidate	Votes	%	±%
Conservative	Mark Evans	370	50.3	
Green	Claire McIlvenna	323	43.9	
Labour	Denis Beaumont	42	5.7	
Majority		47	6.4	
Turnout		738	23.0	
Conservative hold		Swing		
