= Bobbington =

Village in Staffordshire, England

Coordinates: 52.5122°N 2.2827°W

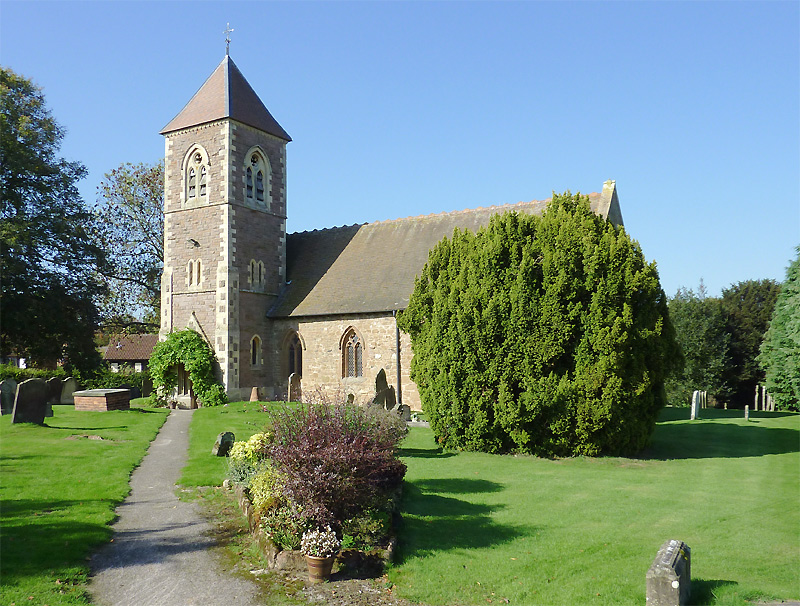
- Church of The Holy Cross

- Location within Staffordshire
- Population: 588 (2011)
- OS grid reference: SO809905
- District: South Staffordshire
- Shire county: Staffordshire
- Region: West Midlands
- Country: England
- Sovereign state: United Kingdom
- Post town: Stourbridge
- Postcode district: DY7
- Dialling code: 01384
- Police: Staffordshire
- Fire: Staffordshire
- Ambulance: West Midlands

Bobbington is a village and civil parish in the South Staffordshire district of Staffordshire, England, about 5 miles (8.0 km) west of Wombourne. According to the 2001 census it had a population of 506, increasing to 588 at the 2011 Census.

Bobbington is just on the county border with Shropshire (to the west), and is about 8 miles (13 km) east of Bridgnorth in Shropshire. It is only about 5 miles (8.0 km) west of the border with West Midlands, and during World War II was home to Bobbington Airfield, renamed during the war as Halfpenny Green, and now known as Wolverhampton Halfpenny Green Airport. On the 12 November 1943 a Royal Air Force, Handley Page Halifax Mk II (BB326) crashed shortly after taking off from Bobbington airfield due to a mechanical failure, killing seven of the eight crew. More notably, on 28 August 1972, a Piper Cherokee taking part in a race event, hit a tree, flipped over and crashed into an earthen bank outside the airfield's boundary. The pilot, Prince William of Gloucester, a cousin of Queen Elizabeth II, and his passenger were killed.

In recent years Bobbington has seen favour in the commuter culture being roughly equidistant from many of the region's business centres Wolverhampton (9.5 miles (15.3 km)) Dudley (9.4 miles (15.1 km)), Stourbridge (10.5 miles (16.9 km)) and Bridgnorth (8.6 miles (13.8 km)).

== Schools ==
- Corbett Primary School

== See also ==
- Listed buildings in Bobbington
