= Dunston, Staffordshire =

Village in Staffordshire, England

Coordinates: 52.760°N 2.109°W

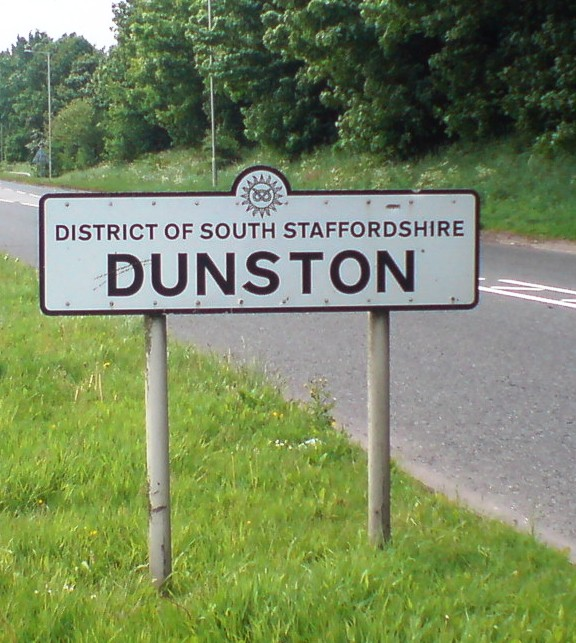
Dunston village sign, May 2008

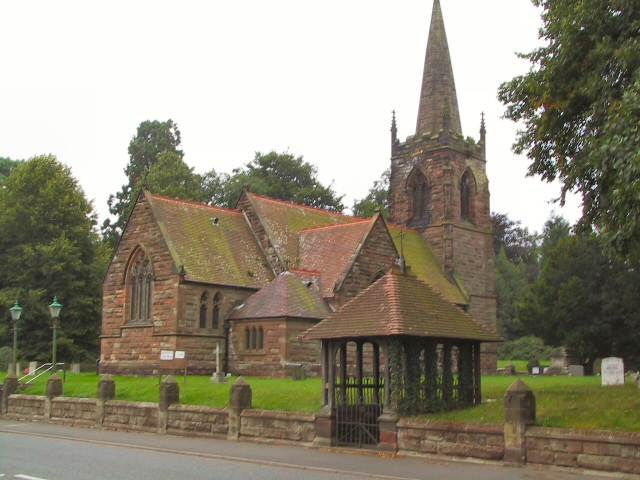
An image of Dunston, Staffordshire

Dunston is a small village in England lying on the west side of the A449 trunk road about 3 miles (4.8 km) south of Stafford, close to Junction 13 of the M6 motorway. The population of the village at the 2011 census was 281. It lies at roughly 300 feet (98 m) above sea level.

== History ==
Dunston was formerly part of the ancient parish of Penkridge. In the Middle Ages it formed a member of the manor of Penkridge and at Domesday in 1066 this was a royal manor. However, by 1166, Robert de Stafford was recognised as lord and Hervey de Stretton was his tenant at Dunston, although the de Staffords retained land at Dunston at least until the 16th century. The lordship and the bulk of the land descended in the de Stretton family for several generations but, by 1285, they were renting most of their land to the Pickstock family, and in 1316 John Pickstock was named as lord of Dunston. The Pickstocks's were actually business people, burgesses of the county town of Stafford. The lordship passed through their hands for several generations, uninterrupted even by the Black Death, until John Pickstock granted most of his lands to members of the Derrington family in 1437. They held it for more than two centuries and sold it to Thomas Adshed in 1638. After only a decade it returned to the Pickstocks, as one Henry Pickstock bought the estate.

The history of the remainder of Dunston, retained by the de Staffords, is complex. A considerable part passed by inheritance to Greville Verney, 7th Baron Willoughby de Broke in 1634 and stayed with his descendants until the 20th century. Other lands were being rented in the early 15th century by Sir Fulke Pembrugge, who became the owner of Tong Castle. In 1577 Thomas Fowke, a London businessman and Merchant of the Staple, bought what was now described as the Manor of Dunston from Edward Stafford, 3rd Baron Stafford. This he later divided in two with John Barbour, another businessman. After Fowkes's death, his share was sold by his son to William Anson, a City lawyer. The Ansons held land at Dunston as they rose up the social ladder. George Anson, a prominent Whig politician, was able to buy the other half of the manor. George's son became Viscount Anson in 1806 and his grandson the first Earl of Lichfield in 1831.

A small portion of the Pickstock lands was rented by the Trumwyn family in the 14th century. This land ultimately passed in the late 16th century into the hands of John Cowper, who sold it to the Ansons in 1607, including a house called the Hall of Dunston. The Ansons leased the property and by the mid-19th century it was the home of the Perry family, from whom it passed to the Thorneycrofts.

Dunston was formally constituted a civil parish separate from Penkridge in 1866. Part of Penkridge was added to the civil parish of Dunston under the Staffordshire Review Order of 1934, increasing the land area from 1,448 acres (5.86 km^{2}) to 1,752 acres (7.09 km^{2}). In 1680, there were 20 houses in Dunston, and in 1817 44 houses, with a population of 214. The population in 1951 was 295. In the next decade, however, the population rose by more than a third to 427.

== St Leonard's Church ==
In the Middle Ages, Dunston was subject ecclesiastically to the large and important Collegiate Church of St. Michael at Penkridge, a royal peculiar whose dean was from 1215 the Archbishop of Dublin. The prebend of Dunston, land amounting to perhaps 50 acres, supported one of the canons of St. Michael's. The prebend was established some time before 1261 and was worth £5 6s. 8d. in 1291.

The village church has been dedicated to Leonard of Noblac, a saint concerned with the liberation of prisoners, since at least the 15th century, as Richard Talbot, the dean and archbishop, confirmed this dedication in 1445 whilst declaring a hundred-day indulgence for all who would visit it and make a contribution to it The prebendaries of Dunston were responsible for the cure of souls in the village. Prebendaries in royal chapels were generally absentees and paid vicars to do their work for them, but no vicarage was apparently established for Dunston – a situation that persisted long after the Reformation.

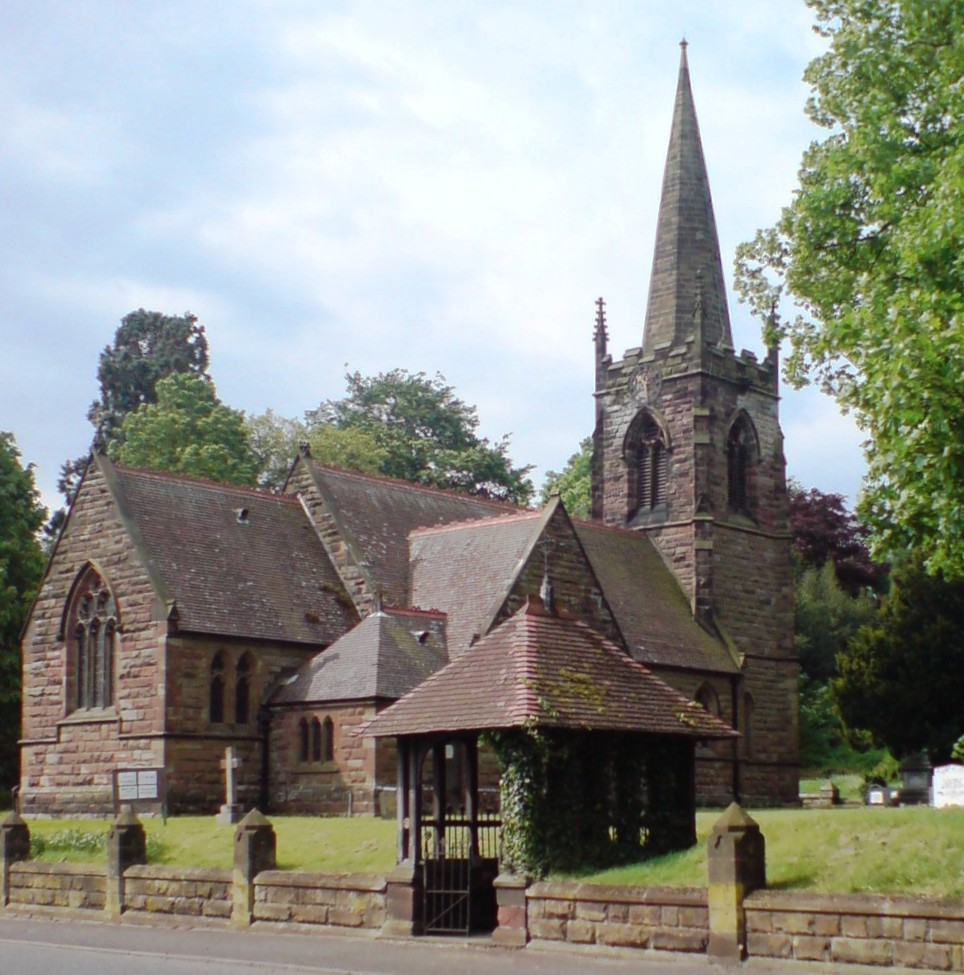
Dunston St Leonard's church, May 2008

In 1548 the Penkridge college under the terms of the Chantries Act 1547, a crucial part of the Reformation legislation of Edward VI's reign. A vicar was appointed at Penkridge, along with an assistant, and this arrangement persisted for several centuries. Ultimate control, however, rested with the successors to the royal peculiar. From 1585, this was the Littleton family of Pillaton Hall, soon to become the Littleton Baronets, and later Barons Hatherton. They had advowson, the right to appoint clergy in the parish, and were not subject to the ordinary, the Bishop of Lichfield. The little church at Dunston was termed a chapel of ease with cure of Penkridge but no specific appointment was made to it: it was simply part of a wider parish, served by two clergy, with the curate generally attending to services at Dunston. Only with the final winding up of the peculiar in 1858 and the establishment of a separate parish was the way clear to provide adequate pastoral care through the establishment of a separate benefice. From 1868 the parish had a titular vicar, and from 1892 the benefice was merged with that of Coppenhall. A new building was erected at the expense of the Perry family.

The village church of St. Leonard's is medium-sized, of Neo-Gothic style and was designed by architect Andrew Capper. Between 1876 and 1878 the old chapel was finally demolished and a new church erected on the same site.

It is a stone building in 14th-century style and consists of nave, chancel, transepts, vestry, and a spired west tower. In 1887, a new churchyard, given by the family of a former parishioner, was consecrated, previous burials having been carried out at Penkridge. In 1907, the vestry was added and a new organ installed. The church contains memorial tablets to Thomas Perry (d. 1861), in whose memory the church was built, to his widow Mary (d. 1881), and to later members of the Perry family who lived at nearby Dunston Hall. There are memorial windows and a tablet to members of the Hand family including Charles Frederic Hand (d. 1900), also tablets to John Taylor Duce (d. 1886), Albert Pickstock (d. 1926), and three members of the Thorneycroft family (d. 1913, 1924, and 1943). The two bells of the ancient chapel in 1553, were replaced by one bell in the new church by 1889. This arrangement was then replaced in 1890 by a carillon of eight tubular bells, rung from a keyboard, donated by Mrs. Perry of Dunston Hall.

== School ==
A primary school was built at Dunston in 1866 on a site given by the Earl of Lichfield, building costs being met by subscription.

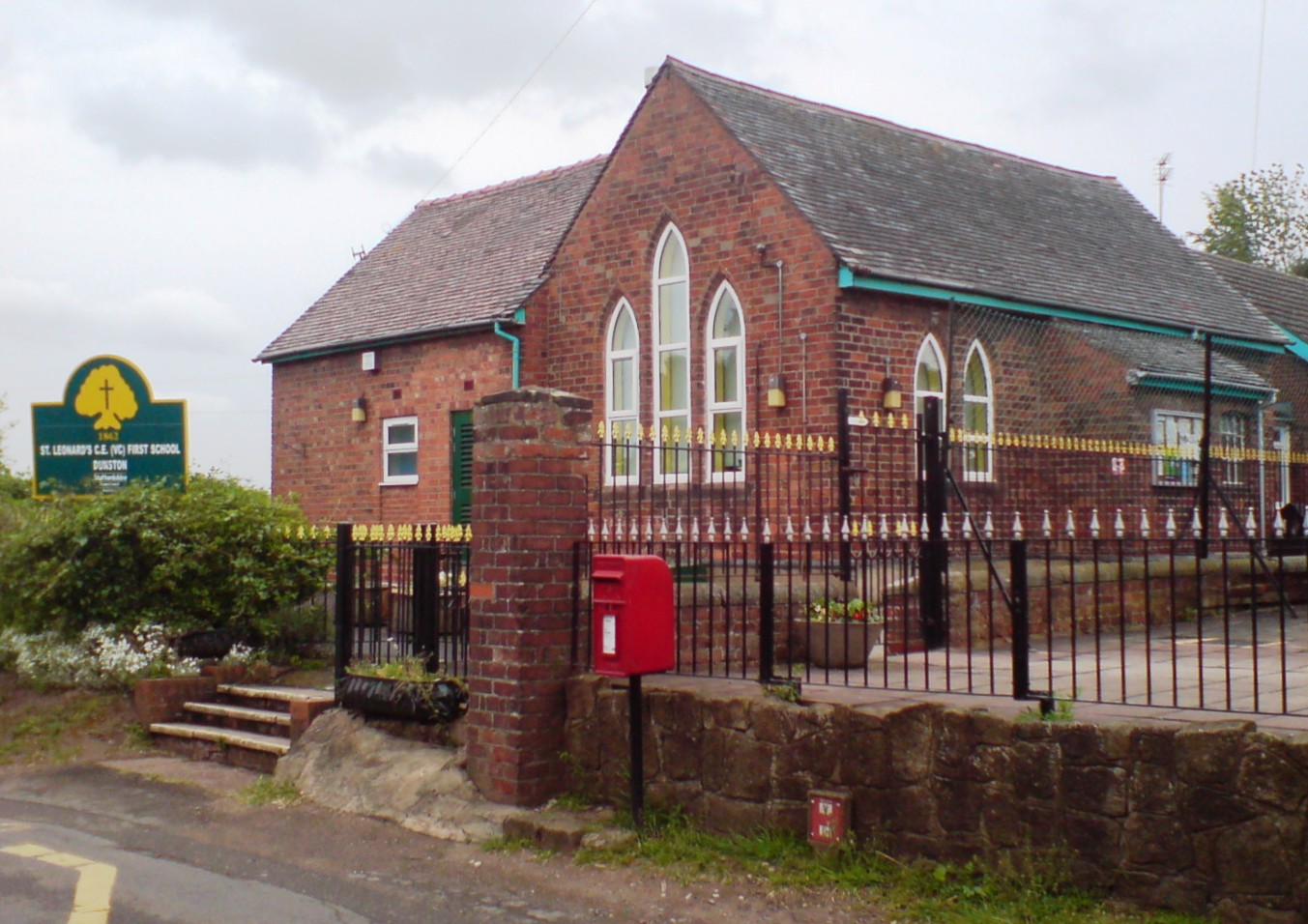
St. Leonard's First School, Dunston, May 2008

Attendance figures for the school in various years:

Year	Attendance
1871	15
1910	63
1930	60
1937	34
1955	32

It is now called Dunston Church of England Voluntary Primary Controlled School, Junior Mixed and Infants. The building is of red brick, the original block, dating from 1866, has lancet windows with diagonal glazing bars.

== Notable local houses ==
Dunston Hall, rebuilt on the site of an older house by Frederick C. Perry c.1870, is a large stuccoed mansion bearing his monogram. It has Gothic detail to the principal doorway and a central tower-like feature. Depressions in the north-east corner of the garden may indicate the presence of a former moat. The brick stable-range dates from the late 18th or early 19th century. The much extended Dunston Hall of today is divided into units for various businesses.

Dunston House, lying on the east side of the A449 trunk road opposite the church, is a square late 18th century building of red brick.

Dunston Farm is of earlier 18th century date.

The Toft, about a mile north-west of the village proper, known in the early 19th century as Old Toft, was built c.1700 and in its original form was a T-shaped brick house with a symmetrical front and a moulded stone cornice. The back wing has an early 19th-century extension and at the front a Georgian porch and a bay-windowed addition dating from the 20th century. This property also has a stone figure of a woman's head and shoulders mounted on the upper corner of the building looking out over the cross-roads.

== Notable people ==
Dunston was home to some members of the Thorneycroft family, who lived at Dunston Hall. George Benjamin Thorneycroft, son of the first Mayor of Wolverhampton (with the same name), was living at the Hall by 1901. His grandson was George Edward Peter Thorneycroft (1909–1994) who originated from the area and was the Conservative Member of Parliament (MP) for Stafford 1938–1945, MP for Monmouth 1945-1966, and was created Baron Thorneycroft of Dunston (Staffs) in 1967. He held various political offices, for example, Chancellor of the Exchequer, and was Chairman of the Conservative Party 1975-1981. Peter Thorneycroft sold the Hall in 1951 which was then converted into flats and in 1956 was sold to the English Electric Company.

== See also ==
- Listed buildings in Dunston, Staffordshire
