= Shoal Hill Common =

Nature reserve in Staffordshire, England

- Interactive map of Shoal Hill Common
- Location: Staffordshire, England
- Nearest town: Cannock
- Coordinates: 52°42′3.99″N 2°2′54.61″W
- Area: 73 ha (180 acres)
- Established: Historical, from at least from 1775 - stewardship scheme since 1991
- Operator: Shoal Hill Common Joint Committee
- Administrator: South Staffordshire District Council

Shoal Hill Common is a 180-acre (0.73 km^{2}) site of woodland and lowland heath located in Staffordshire, England, U.K. within the Cannock Chase area of outstanding natural beauty about 1-mile (1.6 km) from Cannock town centre and 4 miles (6.4 km) from Penkridge It is a local nature reserve.

== Information ==
Shoal Hill Common has been managed by the Shoal Hill Common Joint Committee since 1991, their aim is to replace the traditional practices as far as is possible with other practices such as a programme of bracken, tree and scrub control and heather rejuvenation via rotational cutting to reinstate the open heathland at Shoal Hill Common which was recorded by William Yates in 1775. By doing this they hope to ensure both the survival of a landscape and valuable wildlife habitat which is in major decline, and a diverse number of plants and animals survive both today and for future generations of local people. The Stewardship Agreement with DEFRA shall continue the restoration works at least until 2011.

A number of rare plant, animal, bird and insect species can be found on the heathland including: butterflies (e.g. small heath and green hairstreak), grasshoppers, common lizards, Eurasian skylarks, and European stonechats.
