= Shareshill =

Village in Staffordshire, England

Coordinates: 52°39′22″N 2°04′55″W

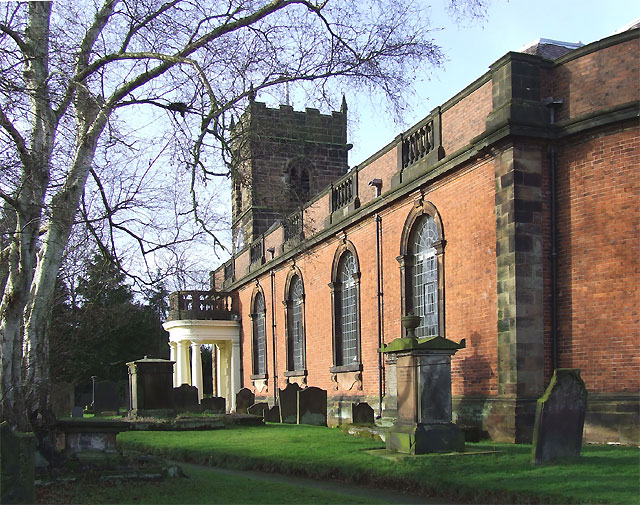
- Church of St Mary and St Luke, Shareshill, Staffordshire

- Location within Staffordshire
- Population: 759 (2011 census)
- Civil parish: Shareshill
- District: South Staffordshire
- Shire county: Staffordshire
- Region: West Midlands
- Country: England
- Sovereign state: United Kingdom
- Post town: WOLVERHAMPTON
- Postcode district: WV10
- Dialling code: 01922
- UK Parliament: Stone, Great Wyrley and Penkridge

Shareshill is a village and civil parish in the South Staffordshire district of Staffordshire, England. The population as measured in the 2011 census was 759. The parish church is dedicated to St Mary and St Luke, Shareshill.

== Shareshill in 1851 ==
In 1851, Shareshill had 594 inhabitants and 4,200 acres of land, including eleven farmers, two maltsters, a wheelwright, a dressmaker, two shopkeepers, three shoemakers, one butcher, two beer houses (the Horse & Jockey and The Swan), two gentlemen and a schoolmistress. Lord Hatherton was lord of the manor, although some land was also owned by Major General Henry Charles W Vernon of nearby Hilton Park Hall, and onetime High Sheriff of Staffordshire, the Rev J L Petit and Alexander Hordern, Esq. Bordering the village are two rectangular archaeological vestiges of possibly Roman encampments. In the time of Henry IV, Shareshill was the seat of Sir William de Shareshill, who was also Sheriff of the county. The church has a reputedly very ancient tower and contains several curious antique monuments.

== See also ==
- Listed buildings in Shareshill
