= South Staffordshire =

Coordinates: 52.6258°N 2.1918°W

South Staffordshire District
- Non-metropolitan district
- South Staffordshire
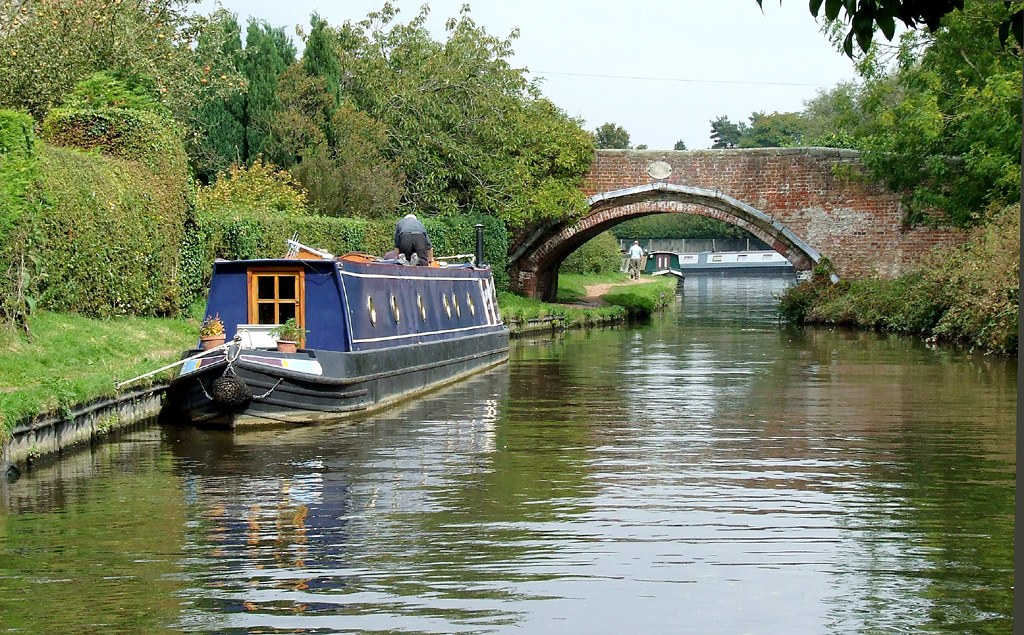
- The Staffordshire and Worcestershire Canal at Penkridge

- South Staffordshire shown within Staffordshire
- Sovereign state: United Kingdom
- Constituent country: England
- Region: West Midlands
- Non-metropolitan county: Staffordshire
- Status: Non-metropolitan district
- Admin HQ: Codsall
- Incorporated: 1 April 1974

Government
  - Type: Non-metropolitan district council
  - Body: South Staffordshire District Council
  - MPs: Gavin Williamson; Leigh Ingham

Area
  - Total: 157.3 sq mi (407.3 km^{2})
  - Rank: 86th (of 296)

Population (2025)
  - Total: 114,811
  - Rank: 215th (of 296)
  - Density: 730.1/sq mi (281.9/km^{2})

Ethnicity (2021)
  - Ethnic groups: List: 93.7% White; 2.8% Asian; 2% Mixed; 0.9% Black; 0.5% other

Religion (2021)
  - Religion: List: 59.2% Christianity; 32.5% no religion; 0.8% Islam; 0.4% Hinduism; 0.1% Judaism; 1.6% Sikhism; 0.2% Buddhism; 0.4% other; 4.9% not stated
- Time zone: UTC0 (GMT)
  - Summer (DST): UTC+1 (BST)
- ONS code: 41UF (ONS); E07000196 (GSS)
- OS grid reference: SJ8701803171

South Staffordshire is a local government district in Staffordshire, England. Its council is based in Codsall. Other notable settlements include Brewood, Cheslyn Hay, Coven, Essington, Featherstone, Four Ashes, Great Wyrley, Huntington, Kinver, Landywood, Penkridge, Perton, Wedges Mills, Weston-under-Lizard and Wombourne. The district covers a largely rural area lying immediately to the west and north-west of the West Midlands conurbation.

The neighbouring districts are Stafford, Cannock Chase, Walsall, Wolverhampton, Dudley, Bromsgrove, Wyre Forest, Shropshire and Telford and Wrekin.

== History ==
The district was formed on 1 April 1974 under the Local Government Act 1972. The new district covered two former districts, which were both abolished at the same time:

- Cannock Rural District
- Seisdon Rural District

The new district was named South Staffordshire, reflecting its position within the wider county.

== Abolition ==
Under current local government reorganisation plans, all district councils in Staffordshire, as well as the county council, will be abolished in 2028, with the district forming part of a new South and Mid Staffordshire unitary authority.

== Governance ==
South Staffordshire District Council

Type
- Type: Non-metropolitan district

History
- Founded: 1 April 1974

Leadership
- Chair: Victor Kelly, Conservative since 5 May 2026
- Leader: Kath Perry, Conservative since 24 September 2024
- Chief Executive: Dave Heywood since January 2017

Structure
- Seats: 42 councillors
- Graph of the party split among 42 seats.
- Political groups: Administration (29) Conservative (29) Other parties (13) Liberal Democrats (4) Labour (2) Independent (7)

Elections
- Voting system: First past the post
- Last election: 4 May 2023

Meeting place
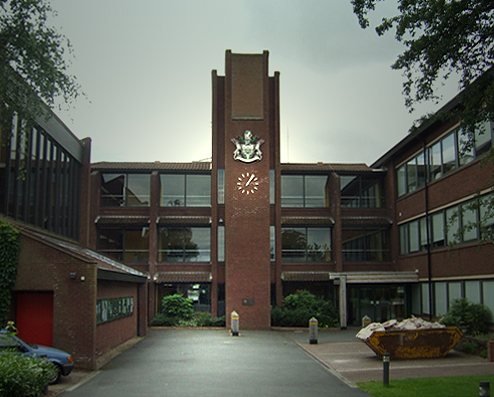
- Council Offices, Wolverhampton Road, Codsall, Wolverhampton, WV8 1PX

Website
- www.sstaffs.gov.uk

South Staffordshire District Council, which styles itself "South Staffordshire Council", provides district-level services. County-level services are provided by Staffordshire County Council. The whole district is also covered by civil parishes, which form a third tier of local government.

=== Political control ===
The council has been under Conservative majority control since 1976.

The first elections were held in 1973, initially operating as a shadow authority alongside the outgoing authorities before coming into its powers on 1 April 1974. Political control of the council since 1974 has been as follows:

Party in control	Years
No overall control	1974–1976
Conservative	1976–present

=== Leadership ===
The leaders of the council since 1982 have been:

Councillor	Party	From	To
Bill Brownhill	Conservative	1982	2005
Brian Edwards	Conservative	2005	13 Aug 2021
Roger Lees	Conservative	14 Sep 2021	Sep 2024
Kath Perry	Conservative	24 Sep 2024	

=== Composition ===
Following the 2023 election, and subsequent changes up to July 2026, the composition of the council was:

Party	Seats
Conservative	29
Liberal Democrats	4
Green	2
Labour	2
Independent	5
Total	42

=== Elections ===
Since the last boundary changes in 2023 the council has comprised 42 councillors representing 20 wards, with each ward electing one, two or three councillors. Elections are held every four years.

The district covers a similar geographic area to South Staffordshire parliamentary constituency, although the north of the district is covered by the Stafford constituency. Sir Patrick Cormack of the Conservative Party held the South Staffordshire seat, and its predecessor, Staffordshire South-West, between 1974 and 2010, when he retired and the seat was won by Gavin Williamson for the Conservative Party.

=== Premises ===
The council is based at the Council Offices on Wolverhampton Road in Codsall. The building was purpose-built for the council shortly after it was created, opening in 1976 to replace buildings in Penkridge and Wombourne that the council inherited from its predecessors.

== Settlements and parishes ==
The whole district is divided into civil parishes. No parish in South Staffordshire has been declared to be a town by its parish council. (Note: Parish councils may declare their parishes to be towns under Section 245(6) of the Local Government Act 1972 and then take the style "town council".) None of South Staffordshire's settlements are classed as post towns either; postal addresses in the district therefore all include the name of a post town outside the district, the main ones being Cannock, Stourbridge, Stafford, Walsall and Wolverhampton. The district's parishes are:

- Acton Trussell and Bednall (Note: Shares grouped parish council with Teddesley Hay)
- Bilbrook
- Blymhill and Weston-under-Lizard
- Bobbington
- Brewood and Coven
- Cheslyn Hay
- Codsall
- Coppenhall (Note: Shares grouped parish council with Dunston)
- Dunston (Note: Shares grouped parish council with Coppenhall)
- Enville
- Essington
- Featherstone
- Great Wyrley
- Hatherton
- Hilton
- Himley
- Huntington
- Kinver
- Lapley, Stretton and Wheaton Aston
- Lower Penn
- Pattingham and Patshull
- Penkridge
- Perton
- Saredon
- Shareshill
- Swindon
- Teddesley Hay (Note: Shares grouped parish council with Acton Trussell and Bednall)
- Trysull and Seisdon
- Wombourne

At the 2021 census the Office for National Statistics identified three built-up areas in the district with a population over 10,000, being Great Wyrley and Cheslyn Hay with 17,640 people, Wombourne with 12,815 and Codsall (including Bilbrook) with 11,865.

== Countryside ==
There are many beauty spots within the South Staffordshire district, for example the village of Wombourne has the Wom Brook Walk and the Bratch Locks on the Staffordshire and Worcestershire Canal in the nearby village of Bratch. Other sites include:

- South Staffordshire Railway Walk: A 5.5 miles (8.9 km) walk along the disused railway line of the Wombourne Branch Line.
- Baggeridge Country Park: A large and diverse country park located between Wombourne and Sedgley (in the Dudley Metropolitan Borough), which has won the national Green Flag Award for 11 years.
- Bluebell Woods, Perton: An internationally important site for Bluebells.
- Highgate Common: A large area of heathland near Swindon.
- Kinver Edge: A National Trust property, located in the south of the district which features the Holy Austin Rock Houses.
- Shoal Hill Common: A 180-acre (0.73 km^{2}) site of lowland heaths and woodlands which can be found to the extreme north of the district.

Bunkers Tree Wood is also in the area and contains a large Corvid roost.

== Media ==
In terms of television, the area is served by BBC West Midlands and ITV Central. Television signals are received from the either Sutton Coldfield or Wrekin TV transmitters.

Radio stations for the area are:

- BBC Radio WM
- BBC Radio Stoke
- BBC Radio Shropshire can also be heard.
- Heart West Midlands
- Smooth West Midlands
- Capital Midlands
- Free Radio Black Country & Shropshire
- Black Country Radio
- WCR FM, a community based station that broadcast from Wolverhampton.

Local newspaper is the Express & Star.
