= Saredon Brook =

River in Staffordshire, England

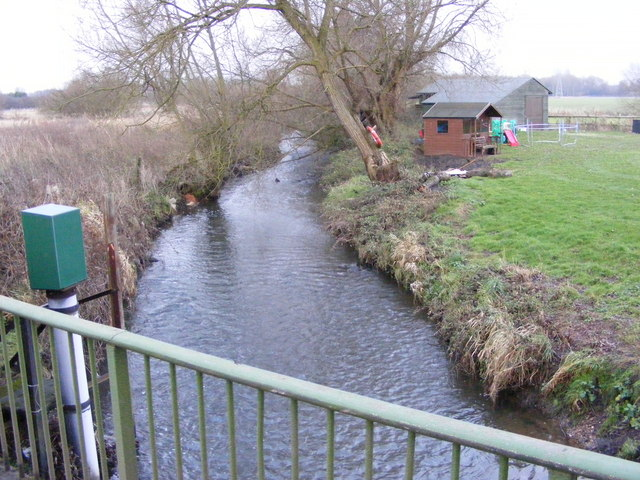
- Saredon Brook seen from Deepmore Farm bridge

Location
- Country: England

Physical characteristics
- Mouth
  - location: Confluence with the Penk
  - coordinates: 52.6651°N 2.1445°W

Basin features
- Progression: Penk—Sow—Trent—Humber—North Sea

Saredon Brook is a small river in the English county of Staffordshire. The Environment Agency state that it is around 16 miles (26 km) long, although not all of that length is called the Saredon Brook on maps. The channel is classed as heavily modified, and its water quality is rated moderate.

== Route ==
Saredon Brook is fed by a number of smaller streams. Gains Brook rises at Norton Green, on the southern edge of the village of Norton Canes, immediately to the north of the M6 Toll motorway. After passing under the motorway and the A5 road it flows through two ponds and turns to the west, running to the north of the hamlet of Little Wyrley. It joins Wash Brook, which rises on the south side of Little Wyrley, and flows westwards and then northwards to meet Gains Brook. The combined flow is culverted beneath a tollbooth on the motorway, and enters a large lake, the outflow of which passes back under the motorway. It then divides into two, with one channel running along the north side of the A5 road and the other passing under it into a large pond on the north-east edge of Churchbridge. Its outflow crosses back under the A5 to rejoin the northern channel.

Continuing westwards, the brook enters a tunnel beneath a roundabout where the A5 and A34 roads meet. When the M6 Toll road was planned in the early 2000s, a new roundabout was required to accommodate the motorway junction. The Lichfield and Hatherton Canals Restoration Trust wanted to ensure that reinstatement of the Hatherton Canal would not be jeopardised by the construction, and campaigned for a navigable culvert to be provided. The government and Midland Expressway, who would operate the new road, were persuaded to provide a larger culvert, although the cost of it was to be paid by the Trust. An appeal led by the actor David Suchet raised the finance, and the brook flows through a much larger culvert than it would otherwise have done. Because of the actor's involvement, it is known as "The David Suchet Tunnel".

The brook is then crossed by the West Midlands Railway line and joins the Wyrley Brook. This rises on open ground to the south of Great Wyrley and the west of Upper Landywood. It heads north-eastwards, passing through two large ponds, and significant portions of it are culverted beneath housing estates in Great Wyrley and Churchbridge. The Wyrley Brook then passes through a culvert under the M6 Toll motorway. This was also built to accommodate navigation as a result of campaigning by the Lichfield and Hatterton Canal Restoration Trust, but whereas the A5 culvert was funded by the Trust, the M6 Toll culvert was funded by the government.

After passing around the northern edge of a large pond, the brook is joined by the Golly Brook, which is fed by the Ridings Brook. The final section of the Golly Brook has been diverted into the abandoned channel of the Hatherton Canal, passing through the remains of Joveys Lock, and after the junction, the Wyrley Brook also follows the line of the canal. Just before it passes under the A4601 road, the Wyrley Brook leaves the canal channel and reverts to its own channel. Once through the bridge, it is marked on maps as Saredon Brook. The brook continues westwards through open countryside, and a weir diverts some of its flow along a feeder, which feeds water into the Hatherton Canal, and ultimately into the Staffordshire and Worcestershire Canal.

The channel is crossed by two bridges carrying minor roads: Catsbridge Lane and Saredon Lane, and then by the M6 motorway. After passing through Latherford Lane bridge, carrying another minor road, a short aqueduct crosses the brook. This carries the Staffordshire and Worcester Canal, and is located just to the south of the junction between that canal and the Hatherton Canal. After Deepmore bridge, the brook splits into two, creating a wooded island, before being crossed by the West Coast Main Line railway bridge and the A449 road bridge. Finally, to the west of the village of Coven, the brook discharges into the River Penk, which flows towards the north at this point.

== History ==
Although the Saredon Brook is now a relatively modest river, historically it supported at least five water mills. The furthest upstream was at Walkmill Bridge. A mill stream split of from the main channel where the West Midlands Railway crossed. It ran to the north of the brook, and the mill pond was on the south bank of the Hatherton Canal at Walk Mill Bridge. It was already marked as "Old Mill Pond" when the 1888-1915 map was published. The site of the mill and pond are now beneath industrial buildings in Lakeside Business Park on the north side of Walkmill Way.

Wedge's Mill was close to Wolverhampton Road, now the A4601, and was fed by Ridings Brook. The mill pond was situated between the Hatherton Canal and Watling Street, now the A5 road, and the mill was used as an edge tool manufactory by 1915. The tail race joined the overflow from the mill pond, and emptied into the Saredon Brook after passing under the canal in a culvert. Modern development has resulted in the Ridings Brook being truncated, and routed into the Wyrley Brook via the Golly Brook.

The mill race for Saredon Mill split off from the main channel to the east of Catsbridge Lane bridge, and ran to the north of the brook. The mill pond and mill building were close to Saredon Lane bridge, and were used to grind corn. The mill had four storeys, but milling ceased in 1925, when the water supply became polluted with sewage, and was diverted away from the mill. The buildings were demolished in the 1960s, and the mill pond abandoned.

The mill stream for Deepmore mill began just downstream of Saredon Lane bridge and ran to the south of the brook, before passing through a culvert under the Staffordshire and Worcestershire Canal. It then followed the north bank of the canal, and turned to the south when the canal did the same. Its flow was swelled by water from an unnamed brook which rises near the present-day location of Hilton Park Services and flows towards the north-west, skirting around Shareshill before being culverted under the canal. The mill stream then made a U-turn to flow northwards, passing under Deepmore Lane to reach the mill, which was to the west of the lane. A long tail race flowing due west joined the brook further downstream. The mill was another corn mill, and records show that the mill existed in 1775. The Monckton family owned it in 1829 and at that time it was also producing blades. It continued in use until around 1900. The island in the river at this point was originally the brook to the north and the tail race to the south.

The longest lasting mill was Standeford Mill. The mill stream began to the east of the West Coast Main Line, and ran close to the brook on its southern side. Both the brook and the mill stream passed under the railway through a single bridge, and the millpond and mill were located beside the road from Standeford to Slade Heath, which was bypassed when the road was upgraded to become the A449. The earliest records of the mill are from 1760. William Shenstone was living there in 1834, and after a period of ownership by the Yeomans family, it was sold in 1930 to the Moncktons, who lived at Stretton Hall. It was a grist mill until about 1912, and then produced horse fodder until production ceased in 1939.

== Water quality ==
The Environment Agency assesses the water quality within the river systems in England. Each is given an overall ecological status, which may be one of five levels: high, good, moderate, poor and bad. There are several components that are used to determine this, including biological status, which looks at the quantity and varieties of invertebrates, angiosperms and fish. Chemical status, which compares the concentrations of various chemicals against known safe concentrations, is rated good or fail.

The water quality of Saredon Brook system was as follows in 2019.

Section	Ecological Status	Chemical Status	Length	Catchment	Channel
Saredon Brook from Source to River Penk	Moderate	Fail	15.6 miles (25.1 km)	27.19 square miles (70.4 km^{2})	Heavily modified

Like most rivers in the UK, the chemical status changed from good to fail in 2019, due to the presence of polybrominated diphenyl ethers (PBDE), perfluorooctane sulphonate (PFOS) and mercury compounds, none of which had previously been included in the assessment.

== Bibliography ==
- LHCRT (2009). A tale of two canals - Hatherton Canal. Lichfield and Hatherton Canals Restoration Trust.
