= Churchbridge Junction =

Road junction in Staffordshire, England

Coordinates: 52°40′24″N 2°1′18″W

The layout of the junction

Churchbridge is a road junction situated between Churchbridge and Bridgtown in Staffordshire. It links the A5, A34, and A460 to the adjacent M6 Toll.

The junction is a magic gyratory, which means that it is similar to a magic roundabout, except that the constituent roundabouts are connected by lengths of roadway.

The current junction layout was created in 2002–2003, incorporating the M6 Toll.

The junction is a source of congestion. The Highways Agency planned improvements in 2014, these were completed in early March 2015. The cost of the work is £2.9 million.
