= Arthur & George (TV series) =

- Genre: Drama
- Based on: Arthur & George by Julian Barnes
- Written by: Ed Whitmore
- Starring: Martin Clunes; Arsher Ali
- Country of origin: United Kingdom
- No. of series: 1
- No. of episodes: 3

Production
- Running time: 60 minutes (inc. adverts)

Original release
- Network: ITV
- Release: 2 March – 16 March 2015

Arthur & George is a three-part British television drama based on the 2005 book of the same name by Julian Barnes, based in turn on the real-life Great Wyrley Outrages. The first episode aired on 2 March 2015 on ITV. It starred Martin Clunes as Arthur Conan Doyle.

== Cast ==
- Martin Clunes as Sir Arthur Conan Doyle
- Arsher Ali as George Edalji
- Charles Edwards as Alfred Wood
- Art Malik as Reverend Shapurji Edalji
- Emma Fielding as Charlotte Edalji

== Fictions ==
While the source book itself is not intended to be strictly historically accurate, the TV series contains additional inventions, such as the murder of a blacksmith and the death of a dog walker at the fictional Rugeley Falls. Conan Doyle's chief suspect Royden Sharp is included in the story, but his suicide is invented to provide a tidy conclusion to the drama.

== Production ==
The production filmed sections of episodes two and three in Kent. The Chatham Historic Dockyard was used to film London street scenes, including the outside of the Metropolitan Police station, George Edalji's lodgings and the night sequence in which Sir Arthur secretly follows George Edalji. Filming also took place at Blists Hill Victorian Town at Ironbridge and at The Black Country Museum in Dudley.

== Awards ==
- Nominee Critics Choice Television Awards 2016 Best Actor in a Movie Made for Television or Limited Series — Martin Clunes
- Nominee Satellite Awards 2016 Best Actor in a Miniseries or a Motion Picture Made for Television — Martin Clunes

== Ratings ==
Episode	Ratings (in millions) Sourced by BARB
1	6.29
2	4.32
3	3.91
