= River Penk =

River in Staffordshire, England

Penk
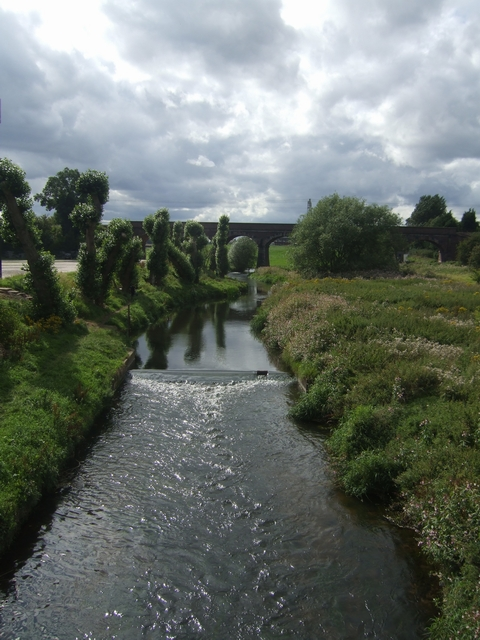
- The Penk at Penkridge, with Penkridge Viaduct in the background.

Location
- Country: England

Physical characteristics
- Source
  - location: Penk Rise, Tettenhall Wood, West Midlands
- Mouth
  - location: Confluence with the Sow
  - coordinates: 52°48′12″N 2°04′55″W
- Length: 36 km (22 mi)
- Basin size: 356 km^{2} (137 sq mi)
- Discharge
  - location: Penkridge
  - average: 2.27 m^{3}/s (80 cu ft/s)

Basin features
- Progression: Sow—Trent—Humber—North Sea
- Tributaries
  - left: Moat Brook, Whiston Brook, Pothooks Brook, Rickerscote Drain
  - right: Watershead Brook, Saredon Brook, Deepmoor Drain

The River Penk is a small river flowing through Staffordshire, England. Its course is mainly within South Staffordshire, and it drains most of the northern part of that district, together with some adjoining areas of Cannock Chase, Stafford, Wolverhampton, and Shropshire. It flows into the River Sow, which is a tributary of the River Trent, so its waters flow ultimately into the North Sea via the Humber Estuary.

== Etymology ==
The name "Penk" is actually a back-formation from the toponym Penkridge. This was understood to mean "ridge by the Penk"; hence the river was assumed to be the Penk. In reality the settlement name is from Celtic roots: pen crug, signifying the crest of a hill, or a main mound or tumulus. From this was derived the name of a Roman fort in the area, Pennocrucium, from which the present town takes its name. Margaret Gelling has proposed a precise location for the mound, now destroyed by ploughing, that gave both the town and the river the names.

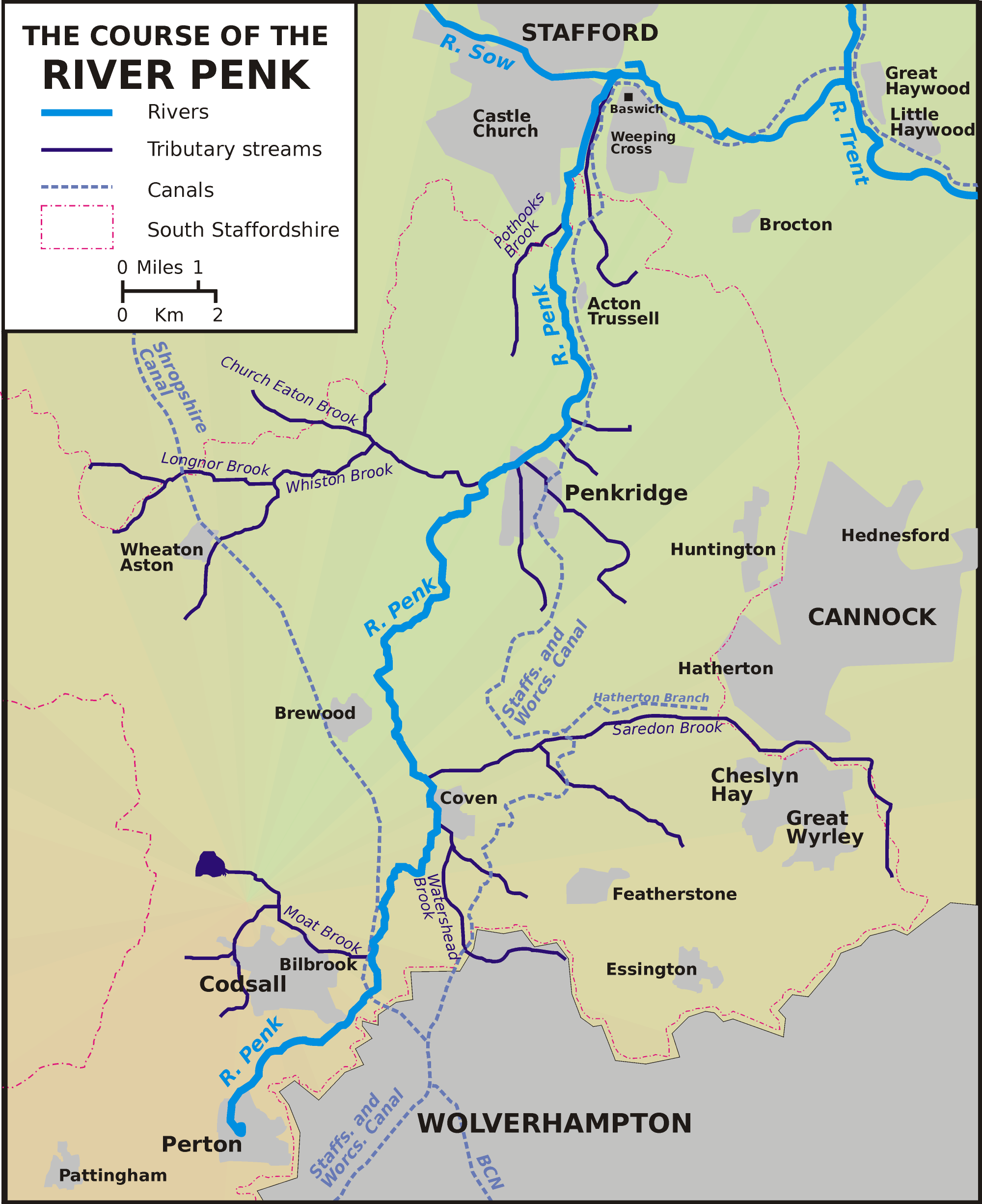
Sketch map of the course of the Penk

== Course ==
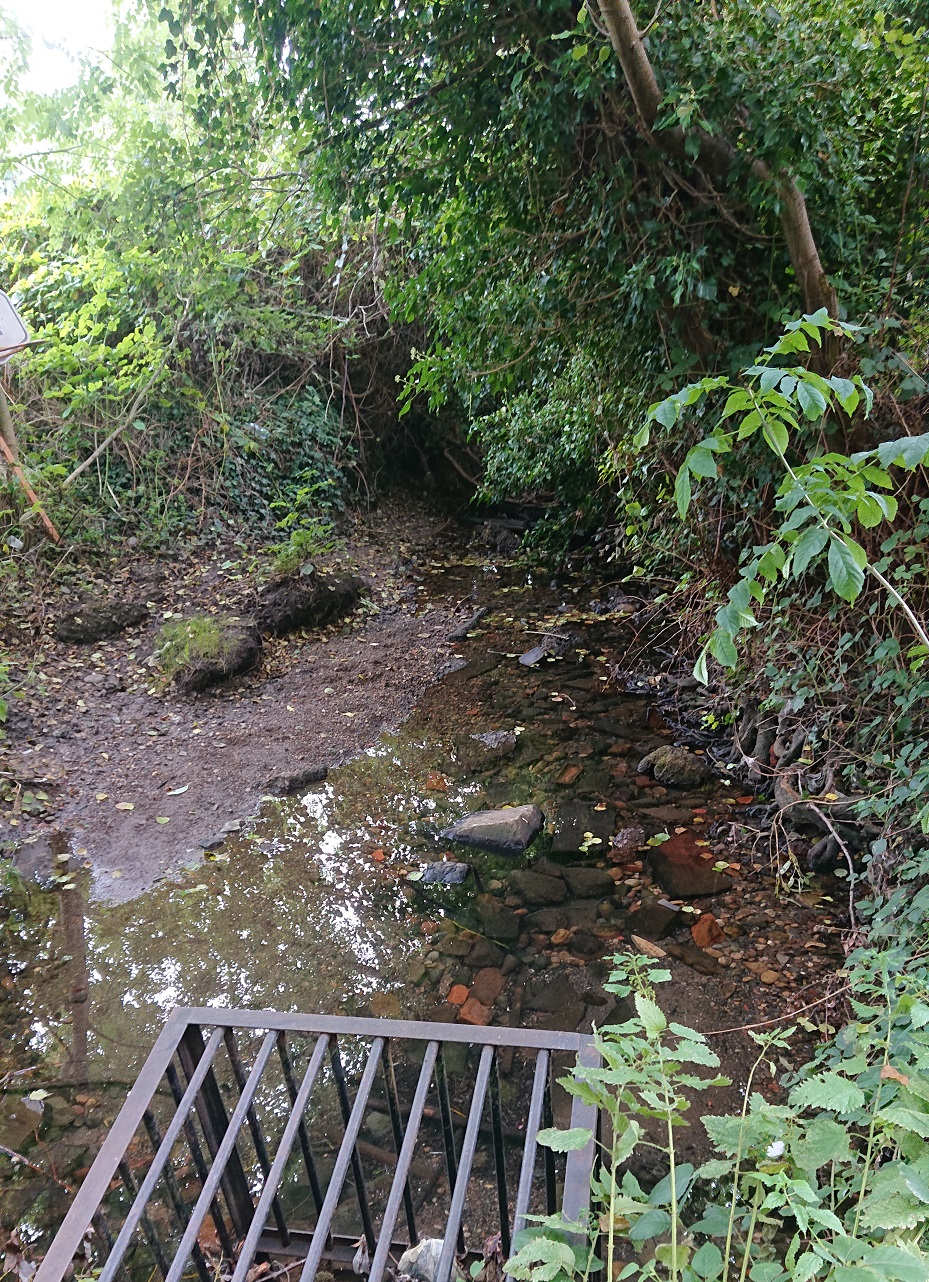
Source of the Penk, Tettenhall Wood

The general course of the Penk is a descent from the mid-Severn sandstone section of the Midlands Plateau to the Cheshire-Shropshire-Staffordshire plain. Along much of its length, the Penk is shadowed to within a few miles by the Staffordshire and Worcestershire Canal.

The Penk rises in Tettenhall Wood, Wolverhampton east of the village of Perton, South Staffordshire, approximately three miles west-north-west of Wolverhampton centre, OS grid reference SO878999 at an altitude of 148msl (est). In 2014, a section of the river that was previously concealed in a culvert was uncovered by the Wildlife Trust and the Environment Agency at Penk Rise Park. Apart from at source, the Penk itself flows entirely within Staffordshire, skirting around the Wolverhampton suburbs of Tettenhall and Pendeford, although it is joined on its right by a number of streams from within Wolverhampton, as well, on the left, the Moat Brook, which drains Oaken, Codsall and Bilbrook. It flows through the village of Coven and is then joined by a major tributary, the Saredon Brook, which drains the area around Cheslyn Hay and Great Wyrley.

It then flows north to the market town of Penkridge, where it turns east and is joined by the Whiston Brook - a tributary which drains a substantial area, stretching out into Shropshire. Turning north again, it flows across the plain, past Acton Trussell and into a marshy area, where numerous drains have been constructed and brooks canalised to contain flooding. Passing on to Baswich on the outskirts of Stafford, it joins the River Sow, which itself soon empties into the River Trent - a major river which will empty ultimately via the Humber into the North Sea.

== Wildlife ==
The river contains many species of fish including Chub, Trout, Perch, Pike and Barbel. The Penk is between the villages of Brewood and Penkridge. Here the river meanders through the Staffordshire Farmland and plays host to a variety of waterfowl and mammals.

The Pendeford Mill Nature Reserve is situated on the Penk to the north of Pendeford, within South Staffordshire but owned by the City of Wolverhampton. A 24-hectare area of lakes, wetland, ancient grass meadow and woodland, it occupies a part of the site of a large former country estate, Pendeford Hall, which possessed an osier bed of willows and a watermill, and dated to the 13th century. It was developed by Wolverhampton council after 1976 and is now host to a wide range of wildlife, particularly birds.

== Tributaries ==
The main tributaries of the Penk, travelling south from its confluence with the Sow, are:

- the Deepmoor Drain, a canalised brook which collects the water from a network of brooks and drains to the east of the lower Penk, and runs parallel to it for several kilometres, before emptying into it just before its confluence with the Sow.
- the FrogsMead Basin, a small stream originating on the southwestern side of Penkridge which joins the river penk, it’s notable for its huge frog population.
- the Rickerscote Drain, which performs a similar function in the marshy areas to the west of the Penk, running roughly parallel to it, and channelling the waters of the Rising Brook, the Silkmore and the Pen Pleck Drain into the river.
- the Pothooks Brook, a small river that originates to the north-west of Penkridge.
- the Whiston Brook, which joins the Penk just above Penkridge, and channels into it the waters of the Longnor, Church Eaton and Wheaton Aston Brooks, draining an area that extends into Shropshire in the west.
- the Saredon Brook, which drains a substantial area to the east, around Cheslyn Hay and Great Wyrley, and joins the Penk north of Coven.
- the Watershead Brook, which joins the Penk just south of Coven, and drains the Fordhouses and Bushbury areas of Wolverhampton.
- the Moat Brook, which channels water from numerous smaller brooks and drains around Oaken, Codsall and Bilbrook, and joins the Penk by the Pendeford Mill Nature Reserve.
