= Arthur & George =

2005 novel by Julian Barnes

- First edition
- Author: Julian Barnes
- Cover artist: Bill Sanderson
- Language: English
- Genre: Historical novel
- Publisher: Jonathan Cape
- Publication date: 7 July 2005
- Publication place: United Kingdom
- Media type: Print (Hardback & Paperback)
- Pages: 352 pp
- ISBN: 0-224-07703-1
- OCLC: 61286197

Arthur & George (2005) is the tenth novel by English author Julian Barnes which takes as its basis the true story of the "Great Wyrley Outrages".

== Plot introduction ==
Set at the turn of the 20th century, the story follows the separate but intersecting lives of two very different British men: a half-Indian solicitor and son of a vicar, George Edalji, and the world-famous author of the Sherlock Holmes stories, Sir Arthur Conan Doyle. Roughly one-third of the book traces the story of Edalji's trial, conviction, and imprisonment for a crime he did not commit. About one-third of the book traces the story of Doyle's life and his relationships with his first wife Louisa Hawkins and his platonic lover Jean Leckie. Roughly one-third of the book concerns Doyle's attempt to clear the name of Edalji and uncover the true culprit of the crime. Julian Barnes called it "a contemporary novel set in the past" and the book does not aim to stick closely to the historical record at every point.

== Characters in Arthur & George ==
- George Edalji, solicitor in Birmingham
- Charlotte Edalji née Stoneham, George's mother
- Shapurji Edalji, George's father, vicar of Great Wyrley
- Maud Edalji, George's sister
- Mr. Meek, George's lawyer
- Sir Arthur Conan Doyle, the famous author
- Jean Leckie, Conan Doyle's second wife
- Louisa Doyle née Hawkins, Doyle's wife
- The Mam, Arthur's mother
- Connie Doyle Hornung, Arthur's sister
- Willie Hornung (E. W. Hornung), Connie's husband
- Mary Doyle, Arthur and Louisa's daughter

== Television adaptation and dramatization ==
Playwright David Edgar dramatised the work for Birmingham Repertory Theatre and Nottingham Playhouse, with the opening performance playing on 19 March 2010.

In 2014, for broadcast in 2015, ITV commissioned a three-part television series Arthur & George based on Arthur & George, starring Martin Clunes as Arthur Conan Doyle and Arsher Ali as George Edalji.

== Awards and nominations ==
- 2005 Booker Prize shortlist
- 2007 Dublin Literary Award shortlist

== Release details ==
- 2005, UK, Jonathan Cape ISBN 0-224-07703-1, Pub date 7 July 2005, hardback
- 2005, Canada, Random House ISBN 0-679-31417-2, Pub date 9 September 2005, hardback
- 2006, USA, Alfred A. Knopf ISBN 0-307-26310-X, Pub date 3 January 2006, hardback
