= Melody Hossaini =

British businessman and entrepreneur (born 1984)

- Born: September 18, 1984 (age 42); Iran
- Education: Great Wyrley High School Oxford Brookes University
- Occupations: Founder & CEO, InspirEngage International
- Television: The Apprentice 2011
- Spouse: Chetandeep Singh Gill (divorced 2026)
- Children: 2
- Website: http://melodyhossaini.com/

Melody Hossaini (born 18 September 1984) is a social entrepreneur, a professional speaker and personal development trainer and coach. Melody is the founder and CEO of social enterprise, InspirEngage International. She is best known as a contestant on the seventh series of the BBC television series The Apprentice (2011) where she finished sixth, before being fired by Lord Sugar and being described as ‘a woman with exceptional ability’.

== Early life ==
Hossaini-Motlagh was born in Iran but her family fled to Sweden to escape the Iran-Iraq War when she was aged just two. She was educated at Great Wyrley High School, a state comprehensive school in the large village of Great Wyrley in South Staffordshire, England. She says that her success as a youth leader led to jealousy from her peers, which resulted in bullying and racism. Nevertheless, she performed well in her GCSEs and A-levels before going on to Oxford Brookes University, where she obtained a 2:1 LLB Hons. Law degree in 2006. She has lived in four countries and speaks five different languages.

== The Apprentice ==
Melody Hossaini was the first ever Social Entrepreneur to compete on The Apprentice. She began the series confidently, coming up with the team name 'Venture' and winning as Project Manager on the first week and avoiding the boardroom for a number of tasks.

Hossaini became the target of an online campaign of abuse by Muslims during the airing of the series who assumed wrongly that she was Muslim. The hate campaign branded her a "bitch" and included comments like "You don't deserve your surname." and "Melody is a bitch for eating sinful food". In reality, Hossaini practices the Zoroastrian religion.

== Career ==
Melody Hossaini is the Founder and CEO of social enterprise, InspirEngage International, established in 2009 offering speaking, training and coaching. The company delivers self-development training, preparing people for the future world of work, to set up businesses and to create social impact in communities. Starting her career aged 13, she now specialises in skills training to support individuals into employment and enterprise, through the delivery of tailored 'InspirEngage Skills Bootcamps'. InspirEngage is the UK's first complete hands-on social enterprise programme to be embedded into the curriculum.

== Causes ==
In 2007, Hossaini was invited to be trained by Nobel Peace Prize winner and Vice President Al Gore at Cambridge, as part of ‘The Inconvenient Truth’. Melody has since adapted materials to be suitable for young people and worked on international projects combating climate change.

Hossaini was approached by JCWI to work on the ‘I am a Refugee project’ aimed at humanising the immigration debate and celebrating the world-changing contributions and stories made by high-profile refugees.

To launch the ‘I am a Refugee’ campaign in 2016. Hossaini became the face of the campaign alongside several other names also supporting the campaign including singer Rita Ora and Michael Marks founder of Marks & Spencer. A plaque bearing Hossaini's name has been placed in honour at Oxford Brookes University where she studied, in a symbolic gesture for World Refugee Day.

As the UK representative, Hossaini attended PeaceJam in Los Angeles, where she worked with Nobel laureate Archbishop Desmond Tutu and other Nobel laureates on peace implementation in communities.

In 2013 Hossaini set up a bootcamp, in partnership with Hillcroft college, supporting women to prosper in business. Hossaini has also worked on a number of programmes, coaching and providing support to help young people with career choices.

Hossaini delivered an InspirEngage Skills Bootcamp with the finalists from the Apax-Mosaic Enterprise Challenge. The workshop was part of a series of follow-up prizes to the Enterprise Challenge supporting students to set up their own social enterprises.

== Personal life ==
Her family decided to relocate to the United Kingdom after Hossaini was once held at gunpoint at the age of 12 at her family home in Sweden.

== Awards ==
- Winner of ‘Women of Europe Awards’ in “Woman in Business” category, honouring women striving to advance the European project in their professional or private capacity, 2017
- Winner, ‘Woman of the Future Award’ – as presented by Princess Zahra Aga Khan, 2008
