= George Edalji =

English solicitor (1876–1953)

- Born: 22 January 1876; Penkridge, Staffordshire, England
- Died: 17 June 1953 (aged 77); Welwyn Garden City, Hertfordshire, England
- Education: George was educated at Rugeley Grammar School and then Mason College, Birmingham, where he studied law.
- Occupation: Solicitor
- Known for: Great Wyrley Outrages
- Relatives: siblings: Horace Edward Edalji (brother), Maud Evelyn Edalji (sister)

George Ernest Thompson Edalji (22 January 1876 – 17 June 1953) was an English solicitor and son of a vicar of Indian Parsi descent in a Staffordshire village. He became known as a victim of a miscarriage of justice, having served three years' hard labour after being convicted on a charge of injuring a pony. He was initially regarded having been responsible for the series of animal mutilations known as the Great Wyrley Outrages, but the prosecution case against him became regarded as weak and prejudiced. He was pardoned on the grounds of the conviction being an unsafe one after a campaign in which Sir Arthur Conan Doyle took a prominent role.

The difficulty in overturning the conviction of Edalji was cited as showing that a better mechanism was needed for reviewing unsafe verdicts, and it was a factor in the 1907 creation of the Court of Criminal Appeal for England and Wales. Despite an official inquiry's finding that Edalji was the author of poison pen letters associated with the mutilations, he was allowed to resume practice as a solicitor and lived quietly with a sibling until his death.

== Background ==
Edalji was the eldest of the three children. His mother was Charlotte Edalji (née Stoneham), the daughter of a Shropshire vicar. His father was the Reverend Shapurji Edalji, a convert from a Bombay Parsi family. He had served as the curate in several parishes before being given the living as vicar of St Mark's, Great Wyrley. The right to make this appointment lay with the bishop, and the Reverend Mr. Edalji obtained the position through the previous incumbent, his wife's uncle, who arranged it as a wedding present. Livings were much sought after because they were scarce and conferred valuable emoluments.

The Edaljis moved into the vicarage in late 1875; it was a large house with its own grounds. George, the first child, was born there soon after. The senior Edalji was a more assertive vicar than his predecessor and was sometimes involved in controversy about parish business. Many writers have noted that the Edaljis were the first Parsis and the first Indians to move into Great Wyrley, a major contributing factor in the hostile way they were treated in the village. An aristocratic former army officer named Captain the Honourable G.A. Anson was the Chief Constable of Staffordshire during the case, in a long period of office extending from 1888 to 1929. Anson was markedly hostile in his dealings with the Edaljis, which several writers have suggested was due to their ethnicity.

=== Anonymous letters of 1888 ===
Anonymous threatening letters were sent to the vicarage in 1888, when George Edalji was twelve and a half, demanding that the vicar order a particular newspaper and threatening to break windows if this was not done. He ignored them. Windows were broken and a threat was made to shoot the vicar; he became alarmed and called in the police. Graffiti was written slandering the Edaljis on the inside and outside walls of the vicarage. Pseudonymous letters were sent to the vicarage maid-of-all-work, 17-year-old Elizabeth Foster, threatening to shoot her when her "Black master" was out. One was found inside the hall with the envelope wet; the letter was written on pages from the exercise books of the Edalji children.

The circumstances made it clear that either Foster or Edalji was responsible. Foster was implicated by assertions made by Edalji; the vicar, his wife, and police Sergeant Upton thought that they perceived similarities between Foster's handwriting and that of the pseudonymous threatening letters. The vicar prosecuted Foster for writing the letters, which she denied doing. He offered to drop the case if Foster confessed, but she refused and went to live with an aunt. Foster was unable to pay for a defence at trial and pleaded guilty in front of the magistrates in exchange for being given probation. She continued to maintain her innocence thereafter. The vicar congratulated Upton for his performance.

=== Letters and malicious mischief of 1892 ===
In 1892, a member of the parish council named W.H. Brookes received obscene letters that included accounts of his adult daughter sexually abusing her 10-year-old sister. The letters mentioned Edalji among others at first, but increasingly concentrated on Edalji and the vicar, sometimes using a phrase ("the blackman") that had occurred in 1888 letters attributed to Elizabeth Foster. One letter was made in two distinctly different handwritings. The letters to Brookes accused his son of writing the 1888 letters to the vicarage which had been attributed to Elizabeth Foster, and of giving them to George Edalji to post. The vicar and a vicarage servant also got letters, in which the vicar was accused of "gross immorality with persons using Vaseline in the same way as did Oscar Wilde". Letters purporting to be from the Reverend Mr Edalji were sent to other vicars.

Brookes and the Reverend Mr Edalji called in the police, and Sergeant Upton again found himself investigating poison pen letters to the vicar. Attempts to get the post office to identify the sender failed as the mailed letters ceased. Notes began appearing at the vicarage (a total of over 70), and various objects were left on the doorstep, including a bag of excrement. Police kept watch and claimed to have established that the key, stolen from Walsall Grammar School (where George Edalji was a student) six miles away, that had appeared on the doorstep had done so in a time frame when only George Edalji had used the entrance. Following this, excrement was smeared on the outside of upstairs windows, and Upton decided that George had been responsible for the letters. It was about this time that Mr Edalji began sharing a bedroom with George; the arrangement continued for the next 17 years.

A police ploy, which was clearly aimed at getting Edalji to incriminate himself as the note writer, brought forth protests from his mother at the way the investigation was focusing on him. She and her husband demanded that Foster be arrested. A campaign of hoax ordering of goods and services for the vicarage lasted for 3 years. Police largely ceased investigating the incidents. In response to her protests, Chief Constable of the county Captain Anson told Mrs. Edalji that she should make a serious effort to help catch the culprit if she wanted his men to spend more time on the matter, as it was obviously either her husband or son. Mr Edalji threatened to complain to higher authority about the conduct of Anson. The notes and hoaxes ceased in December 1895.

=== Perceptions of Edalji ===
Brookes came to believe that Edalji was the author of the 1892 poison pen letters. He said that Edalji had smiled at him in the railway station, to which Brookes had responded with a disagreeable look, thereafter, Brookes asserted, the letters began to refer to him as "sour face". Brookes also said that the letters to him stopped after he had swung punches at Edalji on the platform. Edalji was hired at a legal firm as a trainee solicitor and scored exceptionally high marks in his professional examinations but was not taken on as a newly qualified solicitor. In 1899, his family helped him set up on his own, working out of an office in Birmingham and sometimes from the vicarage.

He was described as looking younger than his age, of a rather peculiar appearance, and solitary, being given to taking evening strolls by himself. A couple of roughs were fined for hitting him while he was on one of his evening walks three miles from his house one night in 1900; the assailants were not from Great Wyrley or known to Edalji. His book Railway Law for the ‘Man in the train’ was published in 1901. A solicitor, clerk to the court and friend of Anson, C.A. Loxton, was later to accuse Edalji of writing "immoral and offensive" allegations on walls about Loxton and his fiancée. Most present-day commenters on the case take the view that the traditional culture in a Staffordshire village of the time would make George Edalji an object of suspicion because of his ethnic background, but he appears to have attracted favourable comment for his book, and had been trusted enough to have clients among local small businessmen.

=== Financial misfortune ===
As a result of having agreed to stand surety for a fellow solicitor (who then absconded), Edalji became liable for a debt of nine thousand pounds. In December 1902 his creditors threatened him with bankruptcy unless he paid a hundred of the amount immediately. Initially Edalji wrote begging letters, but he appears to have obtained the demanded payment, possibly by going to his parents.

== 1903 letters and animal maiming ==
In January 1903, when Edalji was 27 years old, a series of slashings occurred against horses and other livestock, known as the 'Great Wyrley Outrages'. A horse was maimed on 1 February 1903, two horses were similarly wounded on 29 June 1903, and a number of other animals received injuries resulting in their being put down. Isolated cases of livestock maiming were not unheard of as a way of settling scores in farming communities, but the series of attacks provoked a public outcry far beyond the area.

Police received pseudonymous letters purporting to be from one of a gang of culprits, and the letters named real people as members of the gang, including Edalji. Several others named in the letters were schoolboys whom Edalji regularly commuted with in the same train compartment. A letter was also sent to Edalji purporting to be from one of them, 15-year-old Wilfred Greatorex.

=== Investigation ===
The Staffordshire Chief Constable, Captain Anson, was an administrator without experience of investigatory police work. He believed that Edalji was the author of the letters, but someone of his professional status could have had no involvement in the animal maimings. Inspector Campbell headed enquiries into the maimings and from an early stage considered Edalji a person of particular interest, although there were a number of suspects.

The exact nature of circumstantial evidence that led to suspicion falling on Edalji is unknown, but according to what Anson privately alleged years later, Edalji had a reputation for roaming the area at night and, on two occasions, trails of footprints from attack locations seemed to lead to the vicarage. Most of the crimes had occurred within a half mile radius of the vicarage. On 29 June, two horses were mutilated. Following this, the seventh attack, Campbell felt sure that Edalji was responsible for the maimings because he reportedly had been seen late that evening in the field where it took place.

Inspector Campbell began to focus on Edalji for the mutilations. Then a July 1903 letter threateningly predicted that "little girls" would be the target of the next attacks. Anson agreed to a watch being kept on the vicarage and nearby countryside. There were rumours that Edalji was going to be arrested for the attacks, and he offered a reward for information about who was spreading them. His habit of taking walks continued, and he returned from one at around 9 pm on 17 August.

Early on 18 August, a wounded pony was discovered, half a mile from the scene of the first attack. Inspector Campbell sent a constable to the railway station where Edalji was waiting to catch his train, asking him to help with inquiries, but he declined and left for Birmingham. Inspector Campbell went to the vicarage with a sergeant and constable, and asked to see any weapons in the house; a small trowel was the only thing shown to them. Edalji's clothing was also asked for; it included muddy boots as well as mud-stained serge trousers and a housecoat—both of which the police said were damp. The inspector said that there was a hair on the housecoat, whereupon there was a dispute between the Inspector and the vicar over whether something visible on the housecoat was a hair or a loose thread.

The next day, police searched the vicarage and found a case with four razors in the bedroom that Edalji shared with his father. The vicar said that the razors were old ones not in use. According to the police, they pointed out that one razor was wet; the vicar took it and wiped the blade with his thumb; he later said that this was not true. Police said that a heel on the boots was worn down in an unusual way and left a distinctive pattern on the ground that matched heel impressions in an alleged trail of footprints between the vicarage and the scene of the crime. A local doctor who examined the housecoat for the police said that it was bloodstained, and there were 29 hairs on it similar to ones from the pony's hide near the wound. The doctor said that the hairs were small and difficult to see.

Home Office officials later considered it highly unlikely that police would have gone on to fabricate evidence by planting the hairs after the Edaljis had vehemently drawn attention to the absence of hairs on the housecoat while it was handed over. The vicar protested that his son did not have the key to the locked door of the room in which they slept, but contemporaries did not consider the by then 27-years-old George sleeping in the same room as his father a normal arrangement.

== Conviction and campaign for pardon ==
Edalji consistently maintained that he was innocent of all charges. He pleaded not guilty to injuring the pony; an indictment was not tried for sending a letter threatening to kill a policeman. The trial was moved out of the village, which meant that the jury was of people who did not know Edalji. The prosecution accused Edalji of having left the house and attacked the pony in the early hours of the morning. The Reverend said that he had hardly slept that night and knew that Edalji could not have left the bedroom which they shared, the door of which he had locked as usual. According to Richard Davenport-Hines, writing in the Oxford Dictionary of National Biography.

The case arrayed against young Edalji was preposterous. As an astigmatic myopic he was incapable of complicated nocturnal excursions; the vicarage was surrounded on the night of 17 August by a cordon of men through which he could not have penetrated; apparently incriminating dirty razors found in a police search of the vicarage were stained with rust, not blood; putatively incriminating mud found on his clothes and boots did not come from the field where the horse was slaughtered; horse hairs which police claimed to have found on his coat were probably threads; his father’s sworn oath that they had slept the night in the same room behind a locked door was disregarded. After George Edalji was condemned to seven years’ penal servitude, his family was brutally baited.

Edalji's defence did not hire experts to testify about his poor eyesight, nor did Edalji himself mention it at trial, only subsequently was it to be the main grounds for his campaign to be recognised as innocent. He later said that he had been told by his lawyers that the prosecution case was so weak it was unnecessary to bring up how poor his vision was, but he also admitted that he could move about at night quite well as long as the road was a main one and familiar to him. The initial prosecution theory about the mutilations having taken place in the evening was contradicted by much evidence and the case against Edalji was weakened as a result. The police sergeant and inspector differed on whether there was no watch on the vicarage at all on the night or only one man, but they agreed there was no cordon, and the prosecution modified their allegations to assert the attack on the pony had come in the early hours of the morning. Edalji was convicted and sentenced to seven years hard labour.

Some 10,000 signatures, including hundreds from lawyers, were on petitions that protested the conviction. Some legal figures thought that it was improper under English evidence law as it then was for Edalji to be sent for trial charged with separate offences of sending a threatening letter and a pony maiming, and then having evidence about letters used to help convict him of the maiming, which was the sole offence for which he was then being tried.

Roger Dawson-Yelverton, former Chief Justice in the Bahamas, thought that the case for the prosecution had been conclusively disproved. He asked: “How could a gentleman in the position and of the education of Mr. Edalji, be supposed to write the following, put by the Prosecution before the Jury, as written by him. (They were sent either to the Police or to himself). ‘You great hulking blackguard and coward I have got you fixed you dirty Cad – bloody monkey!’”

Senior civil servants at the Home Office reviewed the case and reported that there were no serious flaws in the trial and conviction of Edalji. He was paroled after serving three years.

=== Arthur Conan Doyle ===
Sir Arthur Conan Doyle, then second only to Rudyard Kipling as a celebrated British writer, became the most influential supporter of the public campaign for Edalji's pardon. The weight that Doyle's opinion on the case carried with the public stemmed from the appeal of his fictional master detective Sherlock Holmes, which associated the author with Holmesian traits of close attention to detail and drawing logical inferences.

Doyle arrived to meet with Edalji at a hotel after becoming interested in the case, and he recalled that he paused to study Edalji, who was passing the time reading a newspaper while waiting in the lobby. On observing how Edalji held the paper at an angle inches from his face, Doyle was convinced that Edalji was innocent; he believed it impossible for someone with eyesight as bad as Edalji's to have moved through the countryside after nightfall attacking animals and successfully evading the police.

Anson corresponded with Doyle and met with him in January 1907 to discuss the case, but relations became acrimonious between them two days later when Anson was informed by Doyle that he intended to campaign for Edalji to be given a pardon. Anson thought that a firm conclusion could not have been reached from a neutral standpoint in that amount of time, and that Doyle had obtained his co-operation and an interview by misrepresenting himself as having no settled opinion about the case. Doyle wrote to the Home Office saying that Anson had implied homosexual incest between the Reverend and Edalji. Anson insisted that he did no such thing.

==== 1907 letters ====
The same day that Doyle wrote his letter of intent to Captain George Anson, a long pseudonymous letter was sent to Doyle, Edalji, and Anson with apparent inside knowledge of the arguments which Doyle intended to publish, the first of a spate about the case that they received. It purported to be by a private detective who had been summoned to the vicarage; this was similar to an ingenious deception perpetrated during the hoax campaign of 1892, when a female private detective was led to believe that she was working for Mrs. Edalji to investigate suspected infidelity by the Reverend. It has been questioned whether the detailed knowledge of incidents at the vicarage and Edalji's professional life that were demonstrated in the letter could have come from anyone not at the centre of those events or part of the investigation into them. Attribution of the letters is further complicated by police having used the ploy of sending pseudonymous letters to Edalji on a couple of occasions before his arrest.

The “private detective” letter of 1907 ostensibly offered to help Edalji, but seemed to be an obvious trap. It has been suggested that the letters were aimed at disrupting the campaign to have him granted a pardon. The police handwriting consultant said that the letter was by Edalji in his ‘Greatorex’ hand. Police believed that such letters had ceased while Edalji was in prison, and they attributed those pseudonymous or anonymous letters about the case received when Edalji was in gaol to persons other than the author of the 1903 pseudonymous ‘Greatorex’ letters, which police believed was Edalji. Poison pen letters in the name of the “Wyrley Gang” continued until the 1930s, by an offender who also wrote to people connected to other crimes in the news.

==== Campaign ====
Doyle became an active investigator, going to the crime scenes, interviewing participants, and critiquing the reliability of the witness who testified that peculiarities found in the handwriting of Edalji also occurred in the 1903 pseudonymous 'Greatorex' letters to police, which named Edalji as a culprit in the animal mutilations. Legal technicalities made the evidence controversial concerning the letters being used to convict Edalji, because he was not tried on the charge of sending a threatening letter. Opinion within the Home Office was split on the matter. Doyle thought that he had identified the person as a certain Royden Sharp who was behind the pseudonymous letters of 1892 and 1903 and the maimings. There have been a variety of opinions since about whether he was justified in his belief, although Peter Costello wrote a modern book on Doyle's investigations and concurred with his conclusion.

==== Pardon ====
Newspapers suggested that visual impairment would have made it impossible for Edalji to have committed the crime. Captain Anson told the Home Office that he thought that Edalji was physically more than capable of the nocturnal maiming, asserting that Edalji had a panther-like gait and eyes that "came out with a strange sort of glow, like a cat's eyes" in a low light. According to Anson's communications with the Home Office about the case, an assertion was "indisputably false" that Edalji made in a letter published in a newspaper to the effect that he was not abroad after nightfall. Anson said that several people remembered coming across Edalji very late at night and miles from his house during 1903.

Doyle's articles in support may have been a key factor in getting the authorities to commission a committee of inquiry. Edalji was granted a pardon for the maiming conviction in May 1907, though the inquiry found that he had brought prosecution upon himself by sending the pseudonymous 'Greatorex' letters to police during the summer of 1903, which meant that he was not given compensation.

==== Aftermath ====
Edalji's case and the associated campaign were factors in the creation of England's Court of Criminal Appeal in 1907. A June 1907 memo by Home secretary Herbert Gladstone was discovered 80 years later, which revealed that one of the lawyers who had represented Edalji had privately told Gladstone of suppressing a letter by Edalji, which his brother Horace had brought as a specimen of Edalji's handwriting, because it was damaging to the defence's case. It consisted of obscenities similar to ones that Edalji was accused of sending. When the 1907 letters started, the lawyer's colleague remarked “He is at it again.”

In November 1907, Edalji was accepted back on to the roll of solicitors in good standing and allowed to practice, despite the Committee of Inquiry's conclusion that he had written some of the 1903 letters. His sister Maud moved in with him, and they lived together in Welwyn Garden City until his death in 1953. He was buried at the local Hatfield Hyde Cemetery.

In 2013 Solicitor-General Oliver Heald said that the trial of Edalji had been a farce.

== In popular culture ==
Edalji's case was the subject of the 1966 German feature film Conan Doyle und der Fall Edalji.

An episode of the 1972 BBC anthology TV series The Edwardians about Conan Doyle centres on his involvement in the Edalji case. It was written by Jeremy Paul, directed by Brian Farnham, and stars Nigel Davenport as Doyle, Sam Dastor as George Edalji, and Renu Setna as the Reverend Edalji.

A BBC radio drama, Conan Doyle Investigates, part of the Saturday Night Theatre series, was aired in May 1972. The script was written by Roger Woddis and the play produced by Anthony Cornish. Doyle was played by Carleton Hobbs, Alfred Wood by Graham Armitage and George Edalji by Brian Hewlett.

Conan Doyle's Strangest Case, a radio play by Tony Mulholland was first broadcast on BBC Radio in 1995, starring Peter Jeffrey as Doyle, Frances Jeater as Kathleen Moriarty and Kim Wall as George Edalji. It was produced by Rosemary Watts.

Julian Barnes's 2005 novel Arthur & George is based on the events, and was the basis for the March 2015 ITV three-part dramatisation of the case Arthur & George, starring Martin Clunes as Doyle and Arsher Ali as Edalji.
