= Great Wyrley Academy =

Location
- Hall Lane; Great Wyrley; Staffordshire, WS6 6LQ; England; 52.6656°N 2.0188°W

Information
- Type: Academy
- Motto: Relentlessly Pursuing Excellence
- Local authority: Staffordshire
- Trust: Windsor Academy Trust
- Department for Education URN: 144988 Tables
- Ofsted: Reports
- Headteacher: Alan Brooks
- Gender: Mixed
- Age: 11 to 18
- Enrolment: 600 as of February 2019
- Capacity: 1100
- Colour: Maroon
- Website: www.greatwyrleyacademy.org.uk

Great Wyrley Academy (formerly Great Wyrley High School) is a co-educational secondary school and sixth form located in Great Wyrley in the English county of Staffordshire.

Great Wyrley Academy is located at the extreme south of the Staffordshire border with the Metropolitan Borough of Walsall in the West Midlands, and therefore the school educates pupils from both areas. It has played a major role in the village for many years and are known for their music and performance events throughout the year.

Previously a community school administered by Staffordshire County Council, Great Wyrley High School converted to academy status in September 2018 and was renamed Great Wyrley Academy. The school is now sponsored by the Windsor Academy Trust.

== Academics ==
Great Wyrley Academy offers GCSEs and BTECs as programmes of study for pupils. Students can also study vocational courses at South Staffordshire College as part of their GCSE timetable.

Sixth Form is run as a collegiate with Cheslyn Hay Academy. Students in the sixth form have the option to study from a range of A-levels and further BTECs.

== Facilities ==
The school has facilities including 35+ classrooms, 8 science laboratories, 6 computer rooms, 2 design and technology workshops, creative art suites, a 300-seat theatre, a sports gym, a sixth form centre and a swimming pool.

== Headteachers ==
- Mr A.E Sweet (1967 - 1985)
- Mr J Large (1985 - 2004)
- Mr C Leach (2004 - 2015)
- Mrs N Crookshank (Interim 2015 - 2017)
- Mr L Taylor (2017 - 2018)
- Mr I Moreton (2018–2022)
- Mrs K Moore (2022–2026)
- Mr Alan Brooks (2026 - present)

== Notable former pupils ==
- Michael Foster, former Labour Party politician.
- Melody Hossaini, entrepreneur & BBC's The Apprentice star.
- Andrew Tift, Realist portrait artist exhibited Nationally and at the Walsall New Art Gallery.
