= Mike Foster (Worcester MP) =

British politician

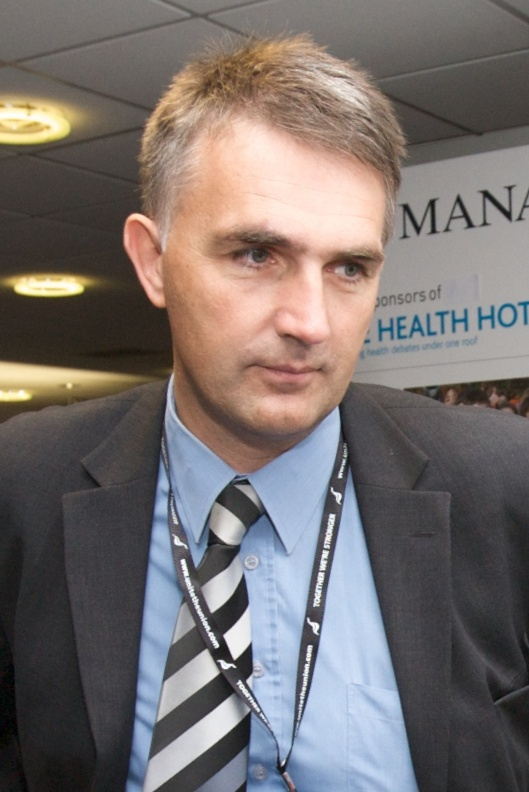
- Foster at the Labour Party Conference in Brighton, September 2009

Parliamentary Under-Secretary of State for International Development
- In office 5 October 2008 – 11 May 2010
- Prime Minister: Gordon Brown
- Preceded by: Shahid Malik
- Succeeded by: Stephen O'Brien

Member of Parliament for Worcester
- In office 1 May 1997 – 12 April 2010
- Preceded by: Peter Luff
- Succeeded by: Robin Walker

Personal details
- Born: 14 March 1963 (age 63) Birmingham, England
- Party: Labour
- Education: University of Wolverhampton

Michael John Foster (born 14 March 1963) is a former Labour Party politician in the United Kingdom, who was the Member of Parliament (MP) for Worcester from 1997 until 2010, and was the Parliamentary Under-Secretary of State at the Department for International Development.

== Early life ==
Michael Foster was born in Birmingham and was educated at the Great Wyrley High School in Great Wyrley near Cannock, and Wolverhampton Polytechnic (now Wolverhampton University) where he was awarded a Bachelor of Arts degree in economics in 1984. He later studied at the University of Wolverhampton where he received a Postgraduate Certificate in Education in 1995.

He joined Jaguar Cars in 1984 as a financial analyst, becoming a senior analyst in 1985 and a management accountant in 1987. He left Jaguar in 1991 to become a lecturer in accountancy and finance at Worcester College of Technology, where he remained until he became an MP.

== Parliamentary career ==
He joined the Labour Party in 1980, and was a shop steward for the Transport and General Workers' Union for two years from 1986. He became the secretary of the Worcestershire Mid Constituency Labour Party in 1987, and the secretary of the Worcester Constituency Labour Party for three years from 1992. Michael Foster was elected to the House of Commons at the 1997 General Election for Worcester with a majority of 7,425, and remained the MP there until 2010. He made his maiden speech on 2 June 1997, where he spoke of the constituency and the Royal Worcester porcelain. He was the first Labour MP to represent Worcester in Parliament.

He joined the education and employment select committee in 1999, and after the 2001 General Election he served as the parliamentary private secretary (PPS) to the Minister of State at the Department for Education and Skills Margaret Hodge. Following the 2005 General Election he became the PPS to the Secretary of State for Northern Ireland Peter Hain. In the reshuffle of May 2006, he entered the government as an assistant whip. In another reshuffle in October 2008, he was promoted to be a Parliamentary Under-Secretary of State at the Department for International Development.

Foster introduced a private member's bill to ban hunting with dogs in 1997; although his bill did not become law, its principles were later passed into law by the Hunting Act 2004.

Foster lost his seat to Robin Walker (Conservative) in the May 2010 election.

Parliament of the United Kingdom
Preceded by Peter Luff	Member of Parliament for Worcester; 1997 – 2010	Succeeded by Robin Walker
Political offices
Preceded by Shahid Malik	Parliamentary Under-Secretary of State for International Development; 2008–2010	Succeeded by Stephen O'Brien
