= List of structures built by Thomas Brassey =

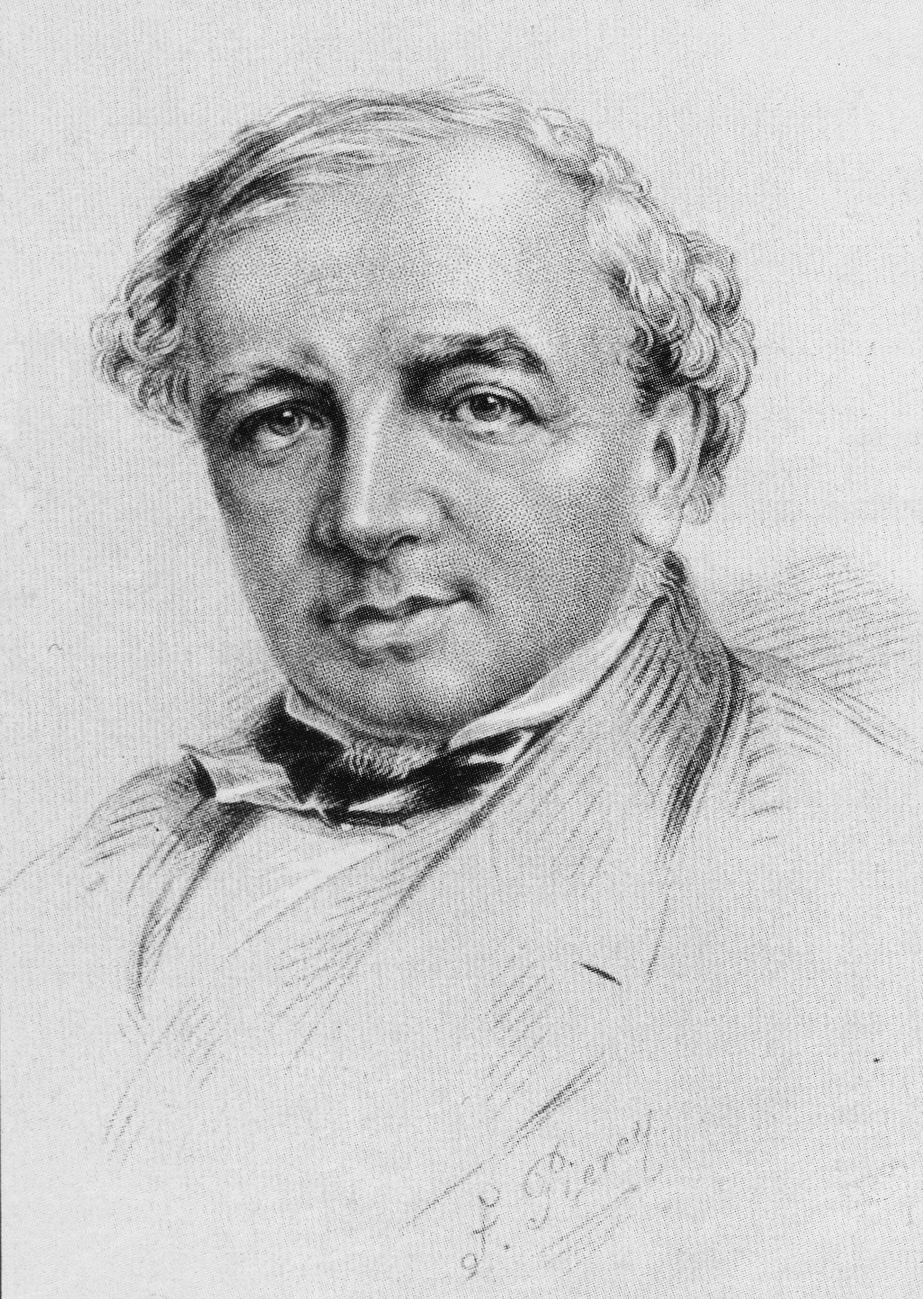
Thomas Brassey in his mid-forties

Thomas Brassey (7 November 1805 – 8 December 1870) was an English civil engineering contractor and manufacturer of building materials who was responsible for building a large portion of the world's railways in the 19th century. For some of these constructions he was the sole contractor but he usually worked in partnership with other contractors, particularly Peto and Betts.

== Railways and associated structures ==
Brassey arranged the building of over 8,500 miles (13,700 km) of railway tracks. By 1847 he had built one third of the railways in the United Kingdom and by the time of his death he had built one in twenty of the miles of railway in the world. He also built structures associated with railways - bridges, stations, etc. - and non-railway related structures. The following is an incomplete list of his projects. For the British railways the dates given are the date of the relevant Act of Parliament; for railways elsewhere and for other structures the date given is the date of the contract.

=== Railway lines ===
==== United Kingdom ====
===== 1830s =====
| Railway | Date | Length | |
| Railway | Date | miles | kilometres |
|---|---|---|---|
| Grand Junction Railway (part) | 1833 | 10 | 16 |
| London and Southampton Railway (part) | 1834 | 36 | 58 |
| Chester and Crewe Railway | 1837 | 11 | 18 |
| Glasgow, Paisley and Greenock Railway (part) | 1837 | 7 | 11 |
| Sheffield and Manchester Railway | 1837 | 19 | 31 |

===== 1840s =====
| Railway | Date | Length | |
| Railway | Date | miles | kilometres |
|---|---|---|---|
| Lancaster and Carlisle Railway | 1844 | 70 | 113 |
| Colchester and Ipswich Railway | 1844 | 16 | 26 |
| Chester and Holyhead Railway | 1844 | 31 | 50 |
| Ipswich and Bury Railway | 1845 | 27 | 43 |
| Kendal and Windermere Railway | 1845 | 12 | 19 |
| Trent Valley Railway | 1845 | 50 | 80 |
| Caledonian Railway (First contract) | 1845 | 125 | 201 |
| Clydesdale Junction Railway | 1845 | 15 | 24 |
| North Wales Mineral Extension Railway | 1845 | 5 | 8 |
| Scottish Midland Junction Railway | 1845 | 33 | 53 |
| Scottish Central Railway | 1845 | 47 | 76 |
| Haughley and Norwich Railway | 1845 | 33 | 53 |
| Shrewsbury and Chester Railway | 1846 | 35 | 56 |
| Liverpool, Ormskirk and Preston Railway | 1846 | 30 | 48 |
| North Staffordshire Railway | 1846 | 48 | 77 |
| Buckinghamshire Railway | 1846 | 40 | 64 |
| Mineral Line (Wales) | 1846 | 6.5 | 10 |
| Great Northern Railway | 1846 | 75 | 121 |
| Royston and Hitchin Railway | 1846 | 13 | 21 |
| Shepreth Extension Railway | 1846 | 5 | 8 |
| Shrewsbury and Hereford Railway | 1846 | 51 | 82 |
| Denny Branches | 1846 | 3.5 | 6 |
| Birkenhead and Chester Junction Railway | 1847 | 17.5 | 28 |
| Leicester and Hitchin Railway | 1847 | 62.5 | 101 |
| Hooton and Parkgate Railway | 1847 | 5 | 8 |
| Richmond and Windsor Railway | 1847 | 15 | 24 |
| London and Southampton Railway Loop line | 1847 | 7 | 11 |
| Shrewsbury Extension Railway | 1847 | 3 | 5 |
| Blackwall Extension Railway | 1847 | 1.75 | 3 |
| Oswestry Branch Railway | 1848 | 2 | 3 |

===== 1850s =====
| Railway | Date | Length | |
| Railway | Date | miles | kilometres |
|---|---|---|---|
| North and South-Western Junction Railway | 1851 | 4 | 6 |
| Hereford, Ross and Gloucester Railway | 1851 | 30 | 48 |
| Harleston and Beccles Railway | 1851 | 13 | 21 |
| London, Tilbury and Southend Railway | 1852 | 50 | 80 |
| Warrington and Stockport Railway | 1853 | 12 | 19 |
| Bideford Extension | 1853 | 6 | 10 |
| Crystal Palace and West-end Railway | 1853 | 5 | 8 |
| Crewe and Shrewsbury Railway | 1853 | 32.5 | 52 |
| Portsmouth Direct Railway | 1853 | 33 | 53 |
| Worcester and Hereford Railway | 1853 | 26 | 42 |
| Severn Valley Railway | 1853 | 42 | 68 |
| Coalbrookdale Railway | 1853 | 5 | 8 |
| Woodford and Loughton Railway | 1853 | 7.5 | 12 |
| East Suffolk Railway | 1854 | 63 | 101 |
| Inverness and Nairn Railway | 1854 | 16 | 26 |
| Leominster and Kington Railway | 1854 | 14 | 23 |
| Salisbury and Yeovil Railway | 1854 | 40 | 64 |
| Stokes Bay Pier and Branch Railway | 1855 | 2 | 3 |
| Inverness and Aberdeen Junction Railway | 1856 | 40 | 64 |
| Leatherhead, Epsom and Wimbledon Railway | 1856 | 10 | 16 |
| Cannock Mineral Railway | 1857 | 10 | 16 |
| Portpatrick Railway | 1857 | 17 | 27 |
| Knighton Railway | 1858 | 12 | 19 |
| Woofferton and Tenbury Railway | 1859 | 5 | 8 |
| Wenlock Railway | 1859 | 4 | 6 |
| Nuneaton and Hinckley Railway | 1859 | 5 | 8 |
| South Staffordshire Railway | 1861 | 4 | 6 |
| Llangollen Railway | 1859 | 6 | 10 |
| Ringwood and Christchurch Railway | 1859 | 8 | 13 |
| West London Railway (Extension) | 1859 | 9 | 14 |
| Tendring Hundred Railway | 1859 | 3 | 5 |

===== 1860s =====
| Railway | Date | Length | |
| Railway | Date | miles | kilometres |
|---|---|---|---|
| Ashchurch and Evesham Railway | 1862 | 11 | 18 |
| Epping and Ongar Railway | 1859 | 13 | 21 |
| South Leicester Railway | 1860 | 10 | 16 |
| Tenbury and Bewdley Railway | 1860 | 15 | 24 |
| Llangollen and Corwen Railway | 1860 | 10 | 16 |
| Cannock Chase Railway | 1860 | 3 | 5 |
| Disley and Hayfield Railway | 1860 | 3.5 | 6 |
| Nantwich and Market Drayton Railway | 1863 | 11 | 18 |
| Wenlock and Craven Arms Railway | 1861 | 14 | 23 |
| Ludlow and Clee Hill Railway | 1861 | 16 | 26 |
| Dunmow Railway | 1864 | 19 | 31 |
| Enniskillen and Bundoran Railway | 1861 | 36 | 58 |
| Moreton Hampstead Railway | 1862 | 12 | 19 |
| Wellington and Market Drayton Railway | 1862 | 16 | 26 |
| Bala and Dolgelly Railway | 1862 | 18 | 29 |
| Christchurch and Bournemouth Railway | 1863 | 4 | 6 |
| Evesham and Redditch Railway | 1863 | 18 | 29 |
| Kensington and Richmond Railway (and Spurs) | 1864 | 7 | 11 |
| Silverdale Railway | 1864 | 13 | 21 |
| Wolverhampton and Walsall Railway | 1865 | 7 | 11 |
| East London Railway | 1865 | 2.5 | 4 |
| Hull and Doncaster Railway | 1864-9 | 15 | 24 |

===== Unknown dates =====
| Railway | Length | |
| Railway | miles | kilometres |
|---|---|---|
| North Devon Railway | 47 | 76 |
| Woodbridge Extension Railway | 10 | 16 |
| Kingston Extension Railway | 4 | 6 |
| Sudbury, Bury St Edmunds and Cambridge Railway | 48 | 77 |
| Chertsey Extension Railway | 3 | 5 |
| London and Bedford Railway | 50 | 80 |
| Runcorn Branch Railway | 9 | 14 |
| Sirhowy Railway | 2 | 3 |
| Arpley Branch Railway, Warrington | 1.5 | 2 |
| Ebbw Vale Railway | 2 | 3 |
| Hereford Loop Railway | 2 | 3 |
| Lancashire and Yorkshire Railway | 93 | 150 |
| Glasgow, Barrhead and Neilson Railway | 11 | 18 |

==== France ====
75 per cent of the total mileage, including:

| Railway | Date | Length | |
| Railway | Date | miles | kilometres |
|---|---|---|---|
| Paris and Rouen Railway | 1841 | 82 | 132 |
| Orléans and Bordeaux Railway | 1842 | 294 | 473 |
| Rouen and Le Havre Railway | 1843 | 58 | 93 |
| Amiens and Boulogne Railway | 1844 | 53 | 85 |
| Rouen and Dieppe Railway | 1847 | 31 | 50 |
| Mantes and Caen Railway | 1852 | 113 | 182 |
| Le Mans and Mezidon Railway | 1852 | 84 | 135 |
| Lyons and Avignon Railway | 1852 | 67 | 108 |
| Sambre and Meuse Railway | 1853 | 28 | 45 |
| Caen to Cherbourg | 1855 | 94 | 151 |
| Dieppe Railway (laying second road) | 1860 | | |

==== Elsewhere in Europe ====
| Railway | Country | Date | Length | |
| Railway | Country | Date | miles | kilometres |
|---|---|---|---|---|
| Barcelona and Mataró Railway | Spain | 1848 | 18 | 29 |
| Prato and Pistoja Railway | Italy | 1850 | 10 | 16 |
| Norwegian Railway | Norway | 1851 | 56 | 90 |
| Dutch Rhenish Railway | Netherlands | 1852 | 43 | 69 |
| Turin and Novara Railway | Italy | 1853 | 60 | 97 |
| Royal Danish Railway | Denmark | 1853 | 75 | 121 |
| Central Italian Railway | Italy | 1854 | 52 | 84 |
| Turin and Susa Railway | Italy | 1854 | 34 | 55 |
| Elizabeth and Linz Railway | Austria | 1856 | 40 | 64 |
| Bilbao and Miranda Railway | Spain | 1858 | 66 | 106 |
| Victor Emmanuel Railway | Italy | 1859 | 73 | 117 |
| Ivrea Railway | Italy | 1859 | 19 | 31 |
| Jutland Railway | Denmark | 1860 | 270 | 435 |
| Maremma and Leghorn Railway | Italy | 1860 | 138 | 222 |
| Meridionale Railway | Italy | 1863 | 160 | 257 |
| North Schleswig Railway | Denmark | 1863 | 70 | 113 |
| Lemberg and Czernowitz Railway | Austrian Empire (now Ukraine) | 1864 | 165 | 266 |
| Viersen and Venlo Railway | Now in Germany to Netherlands | 1864 | 11 | 18 |
| Warsaw and Terespol Railway | Poland | 1865 | 128 | 206 |
| Kronprinz Rudolph Railway | Austrian Empire (now Austria, Slovenia) | 1867 | 272 | 438 |
| Czernowitz and Suczawa Railway | Austrian Empire (now Ukraine) | 1867 | 60 | 97 |
| Vorarlberg Railway | Austria | 1870 | 55 | 89 |
| Suczawa and Jassy Railway | Romania | 1870 | 135 | 217 |

==== Canada ====
| Railway | Date | Length | |
| Railway | Date | miles | kilometres |
|---|---|---|---|
| Grand Trunk Railway, Quebec to Toronto | 1854–1860 | 539 | 867 |

==== Argentina ====
| Railway | Date | Length | |
| Railway | Date | miles | kilometres |
|---|---|---|---|
| Central Argentine Railway | 1864 | 247 | 398 |
| La Boca and Barracas Railway | 1865 | 3 | 5 |

==== Australia ====
| Railway | Date | Length | |
| Railway | Date | miles | kilometres |
|---|---|---|---|
| Great Northern, Great Eastern and Great Southern Railways, New South Wales | 1859 | 54 | 87 |
| Queensland Railway | 1863 | 78 | 126 |

==== India ====
| Railway | Date | Length | |
| Railway | Date | miles | kilometres |
|---|---|---|---|
| Eastern Bengal Railway | 1858 | 112 | 180 |
| Delhi Railway | 1864 | 304 | 489 |
| Chord Railway | 1865 | 147 | 237 |

==== Mauritius ====
| Railway | Date | Length | |
| Railway | Date | miles | kilometres |
|---|---|---|---|
| Mauritius Railway | 1862 | 64 | 103 |

=== Tunnels ===
| Tunnel | Line & Country | Date | Length |
|---|---|---|---|
| Shugborough Tunnel | Trent Valley Line, England | 1847 | 2,331 ft (710 m) |
| Hausenstein Tunnel | Basel to Olten line, Switzerland | 1853 | 1.5 miles (2 km) |
| Bellegarde Tunnel | France | 1854 | 2.5 miles (4 km) |

=== Stations ===
Many hundreds, including:

| Station | Date | Notes |
|---|---|---|
| Trent Valley Line Stations | 1847 | |
| Chester | 1848 | had the longest platforms in the country at the time of its opening |
| Caledonian Railway Stations and Maintenance | 1848 | |
| Shrewsbury | 1848 | |
| Salisbury | 1859 | |
| Nantwich | 1858 | |

=== Viaducts and other structures ===
Many, including:

| Structure | Date | Line |
|---|---|---|
| Penkridge Viaduct | 1837 | Grand Junction Railway |
| Malaunay Viaduct | 1844 | Paris to Le Havre railway |
| Mirville Viaduct | 1844 | Paris to Le Havre railway |
| Brantham Cutting, Manningtree | 1845 | |
| Austreberth Bridge | 1847 | Paris to Le Havre railway |
| Cefn Mawr Viaduct | 1848 | Chester to Shrewsbury railway |
| Chirk Viaduct | 1859 | Chester to Shrewsbury railway |
| Welwyn (or Digswell) Viaduct | 1850 | East Coast Main Line |

=== Bridges ===
Again a large number, including:

| Structure | Date |
|---|---|
| Bury Saint Edmunds Station Bridge | 1846 |
| Richmond | 1848 |
| Barnes | 1849 |
| Coghines Bridge, Italy | 1855 |
| Victoria Bridge, Worcestershire | 1861 |
| Severn | 1861 |
| Stonework for the Runcorn bridge | 1868 |
| Kew | 1869 |

== Non-railway projects ==
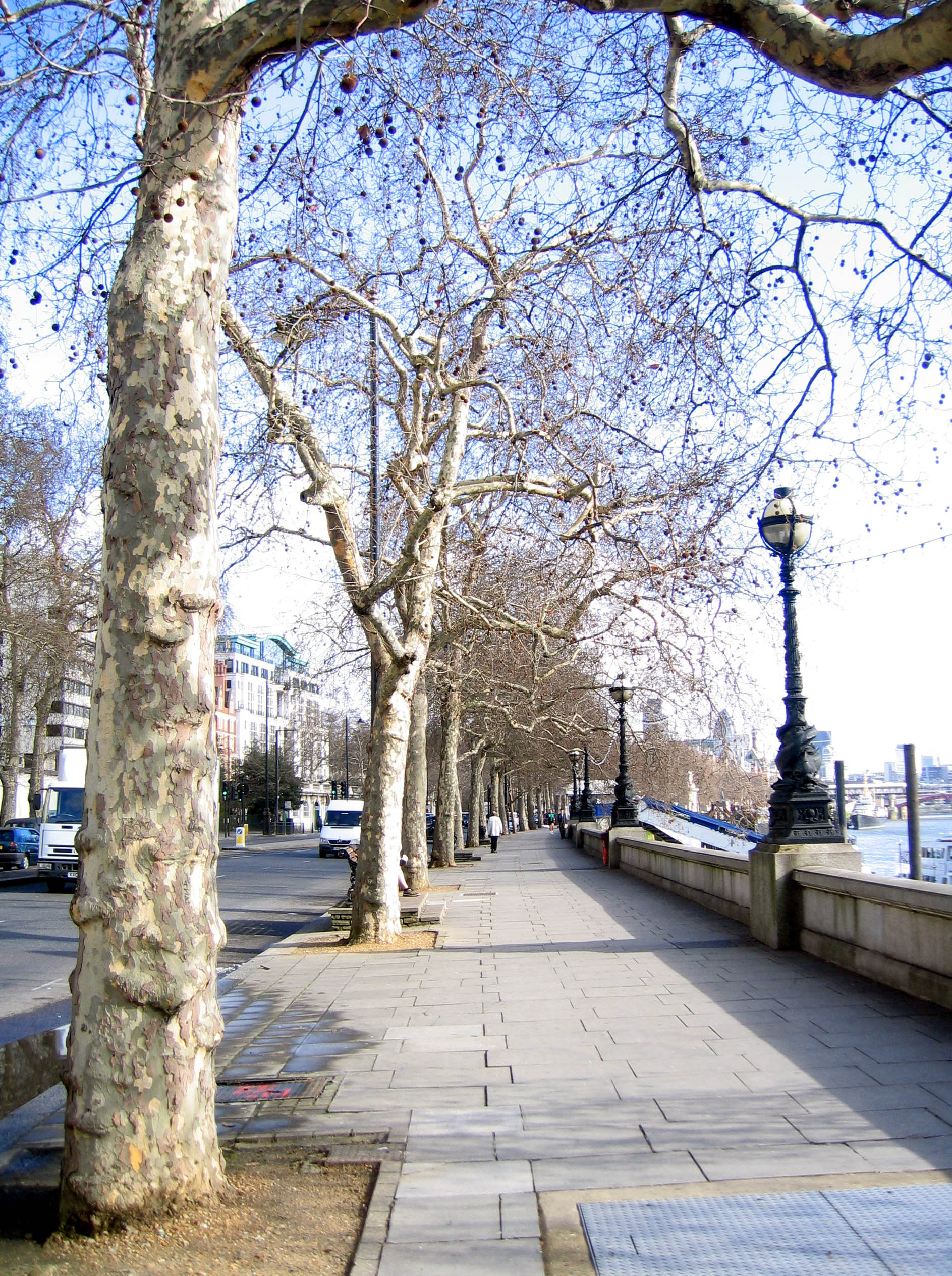
Victoria Embankment opposite Somerset House, February 2008

| Structure | Date | Notes |
|---|---|---|
| Bromborough Road, Cheshire | 1834 | including Saughall Massie road bridge |
| Greenock Harbour | 1845 | |
| Birkenhead Docks | 1850 | |
| Victoria Docks, London | 1851 | over 100 acres (40 ha), with associated warehousing |
| Minories Warehouses | 1857 | |
| Ludlow Drainage | 1861 | |
| Metropolitan Mid Level Sewer, London | 1861 | 12 miles (19 km) |
| Rio Janeiro Drainage | 1862 | |
| Barrow Docks | 1863 | |
| Worm Drainage | 1863 | |
| Letton Drainage | 1864 | |
| Dee Reclamation Works | 1865 | |
| Calcutta Waterworks | 1865 | |
| Victoria Embankment, London | 1866 | |
| Nepean Bridge | 1869 | |
| Callao Docks, Peru | 1870 | |
