= Penkridge Viaduct =

Railway viaduct in Penkridge, Staffordshire, England

Coordinates: 52.7274°N 2.1188°W

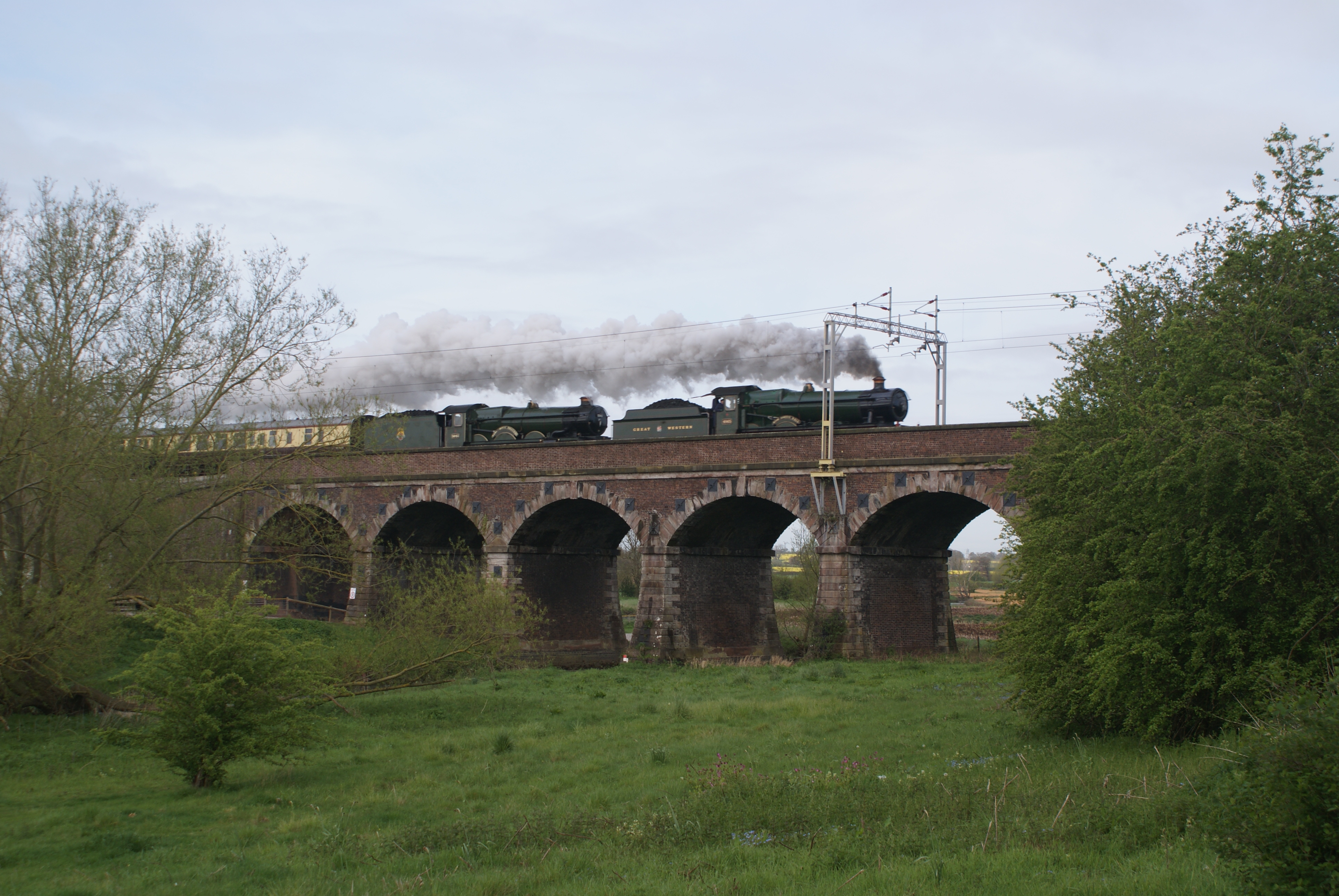
Preserved Great Western Railway locomotives 4965 Rood Ashton Hall and 5043 Earl of Mount Edgcumbe double head a steam railtour over Penkridge Viaduct in May 2012.

Penkridge Viaduct is a railway bridge north of the village of Penkridge, in Staffordshire, England (mid-way between Wolverhampton and Stafford). It carries the West Coast Main Line over the River Penk. It is a Grade II listed building.

== History ==
The bridge was built in 1837 for the Grand Junction Railway, which connected Birmingham to the Liverpool and Manchester Railway. The line was surveyed by Robert Stephenson, who designed the viaduct. The engineer for the southern half of the GJR was Joseph Locke and the contractor was Thomas Brassey. It was Brassey's first successful bid for a contract; he went on to be one of the world's leading railway builders. The cost of the viaduct was £6,000 (£490,000 as of 2015).

The viaduct's official opening was on 4 July 1837. The viaduct remains in use as part of the West Coast Main Line.

== Description ==
The viaduct and an adjoining embankment were needed to cross the River Penk and its valley. It consists of seven segmental arches, each of 30 feet (9.1 metres) span. It reaches a maximum height of 37 feet (11 metres) and is 80 yards (73 metres) long. It is built in a combination of red brick and Staffordshire blue brick with stepped voussoirs in sandstone ashlar. It has a substantial cornice, rusticated ashlar abutments, and splayed piers. A brick parapet rises from a stone string course. The river flows under the third arch from the south (Wolverhampton) end; the northernmost arch spans a minor road.

The viaduct is a Grade II listed building, a status which provides it with legal protection. It is very similar to Pinfold Lane Bridge, a smaller bridge over the railway immediately to the south The railway historian Gordon Biddle described it as "a modest viaduct [but] for all its lack of splendour it is quite handsome".

== See also ==
- Listed buildings in Penkridge
- List of structures built by Thomas Brassey
