= St Mark's Church, Great Wyrley =

St Mark's Church
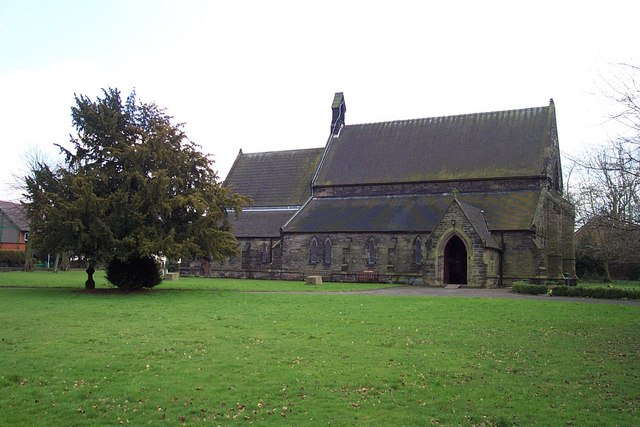
- The church in April 2006
- St Mark's Church
- 52°39′58″N 2°01′25.02″W
- OS grid reference: SJ 984 076
- Location: Great Wyrley
- Country: England
- Denomination: Church of England
- Website: www.greatwyrleyparish.org.uk

History
- Dedication: St Mark
- Consecrated: 22 July 1845

Architecture
- Architect: Thomas Johnson
- Style: Early English
- Groundbreaking: 1844
- Completed: 1845
- Construction cost: £2,800

Administration
- Diocese: Diocese of Lichfield
- Archdeaconry: Lichfield
- Deanery: Rugeley
- Parish: Great Wyrley

Clergy
- Vicar: Revd. Graham Horner

St Mark's is the parish church of Great Wyrley, South Staffordshire, England. It is known for having had the first South Asian vicar of any Church of England parish, Shapurji Edalji, and for its association with Edalji's son George, who was falsely convicted on a charge of injuring a pony, and cleared after the intervention of Sir Arthur Conan Doyle.

== History ==
The stone church, in early English style, its vicarage and an adjacent school were built in 1845 to designs by the architect Thomas Johnson of Lichfield and consecrated on Tuesday 22 July 1845 by John Lonsdale, Bishop of Lichfield.

The church's early baptism, marriage and burial registers are held by Staffordshire Records Office, the Bishops' transcripts at Lichfield Records Office.

=== The Edaljis ===
Shapurji Edalji was given the 'living' as vicar of St Mark's by Lonsdale's successor George Selwyn. Edalji obtained the position though the previous incumbent, his wife's uncle, who arranged it as a wedding present. 'Livings' were scarce, conferred valuable emoluments and were much sought after.

Edalji moved into the vicarage, a large house with its own grounds, in late 1875; George, the first child, was born there soon after. The Reverend Edaji was more assertive than his predecessor and was sometimes involved in controversy about parish business.

Edalji senior died at the vicarage in 1918 and is buried in the churchyard.

== Current activity ==
The church and its neighbour, the parish's other CoE church, St Andrew's, Landywood are managed in tandem.

There is a church hall adjacent to the church.

As of March 2015 the vicar is the Revd. Graham Horner.

== Organ ==
The church has a pipe organ by Nicholson dating from 2000, an earlier organ having been damaged by fire. A specification of the organ can be found on the National Pipe Organ Register.
