= Little Wyrley =

Hamlet in Staffordshire, England

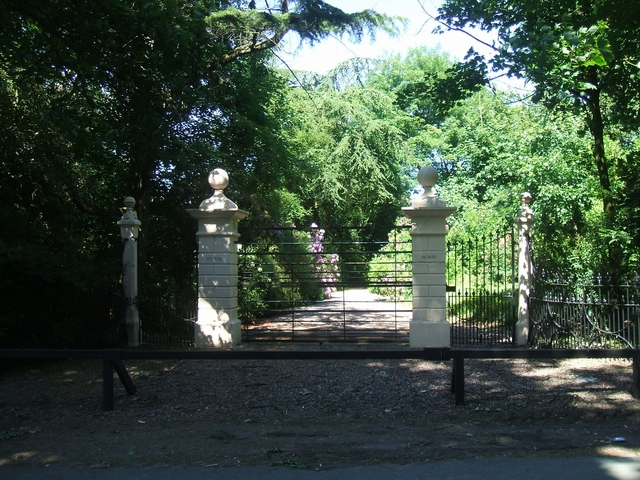

- Location within Staffordshire
- Civil parish: Norton Canes
- District: Cannock Chase
- Shire county: Staffordshire
- Region: West Midlands
- Country: England
- Sovereign state: United Kingdom
- Post town: Walsall
- Postcode district: WS2
- Police: Staffordshire
- Fire: Staffordshire
- Ambulance: West Midlands
- UK Parliament: Cannock Chase

Little Wyrley is a hamlet in the Cannock Chase district, in the county of Staffordshire, England. It forms part of Norton Canes. In 1870-72 it had a population of 61 as recorded in the Imperial Gazetteer of England and Wales.

It borders the village of Great Wyrley, Norton Canes, and Pelsall.

Little Wyrley Hall is currently owned by the Wallace family, who also own much of the land in Little Wyrley. Apart from the Hall, there is also a Tythe Barn and a number of houses.

== Transport ==
=== Road ===
There are a few country lanes through Little Wyrley, the main one being Wyrley Lane, that give access to main, busier roads, including the A34 that runs through Great Wyrley, the A5, and the B4154 road that leads to Pelsall going south. The house numbers do not go sequentially and there are large gaps of land between them. School Lane was closed to traffic some years ago.

=== Other ===
There are no other forms of transport through Little Wyrley and it is not on any bus routes.
