= Arsher Ali =

British actor

- Born: Nottingham, England
- Education: East 15 Acting School
- Occupation: Actor
- Years active: 2009–present
- Known for: Beaver Falls (2011–2012); Ackley Bridge (2017–2018)
- Spouse: Roxy Shahidi (m. 2010)
- Children: 1

Arsher Ali is a British actor. He has played various TV and film roles, and is a regular lead performer at the Royal Shakespeare Company in Stratford-upon-Avon.

== Personal life ==
Ali is of Pakistani descent. He is a graduate of East 15 Acting School. He married British-Iranian actress Roxy Shahidi in 2010. The couple had their first child, a daughter, in January 2018. Ali has been vocal throughout his career about the challenges faced by British Asian actors in the film industry and his continual fight against racial typecasting.

Ali is a keen Nottingham Forest fan.

== Filmography ==
Key
†	Denotes projects that have not yet been released

=== Film ===
Year	Title	Role	Notes	Ref.
2007	Maxwell	Franklin	Television film	
2010	Four Lions	Hassan Malik		
2010	Pulse	Adam Hussein	Television film	
2012	All in Good Time	Etash Tailor		
2013	Complicit	Waleed Ahmed	Television film	
2014	ALT	Callum	Television film	
2015	A Patch of Fog	Troy Griffin		
2015	Remainder	Naz Vyus		
2016	The Darkest Universe	Dr Max Robson		
2017	The Ritual	Phil		
2018	To Provide All People	Junior Doctor	Television film	
2018	Been So Long	Jake		
2019	The Flood	Nasrat		
2021	The Dig	William Grimes		

=== Television ===
Year	Title	Role	Notes	Ref.
2007	Trial & Retribution	Radi	Episode: "Curriculum Vitae"	
2007	Britz	Matloob	Miniseries; 2 episodes	
2010	Wallander	Jamal Alheed	Episode: "Faceless Killers"	
2011	Silent Witness	Zak Khan	Series 14 regular; 8 episodes	
2011–2012	Beaver Falls	Adil "A-Rab" Hussain	Series regular; 12 episodes	
2013	The Guilty	DS Vinesh Roy	Miniseries; 3 episodes	
2014	The Missing	Malik Suri	Series 1 regular; 7 episodes	
2015	Arthur & George	George Edalji	Miniseries; 3 episodes	
2015	Doctor Who	Bennett	Recurring role, 2 episodes	
2016	Line of Duty	PC Hari Bains	Series 3 regular; 4 episodes	
2017–2018	Ackley Bridge	Samir Qureshi	Series regular; 9 episodes	
2018	Hang Ups	Ryan Mehta	Recurring role; 2 episodes	
2018	Informer	Imran Aziz	Series regular; 5 episodes	
2020	Cold Courage	DCI Peter Chandra	Series regular; 8 episodes	
2022	The Fear Index	Hugo Quarry	Miniseries; 4 episodes	
2022	Avenue 5	Lucas Sato	Series 2 regular; 7 episodes	
2022–2024	Funny Woman	Dennis Mahindra	Series regular; 10 episodes	
2023	Top Boy	Isaac	Episode: "If We Are Not Monsters"	
2023–2024	Everyone Else Burns	Elder Samson	Series regular; 11 episodes	
2026	Hijack	Robert Lang	Series 2 regular; 6 episodes	

== Theatre credits ==
Year	Title	Role	Venue	Ref.
2008	The Taming of the Shrew	Philip / Huntsman	The Courtyard Theatre, Stratford-upon-Avon	
2008	The Merchant of Venice	Prince of Morocco	The Courtyard Theatre, Stratford-upon-Avon	
2008	The Tragedy of Thomas Hobbes	Charles II	Wilton's Music Hall, London	
2009	What Fatima Did	Mo Merchant	Hampstead Theatre, London	
2011	A Midsummer Night's Dream	Puck	Royal Shakespeare Theatre, Stratford-upon-Avon	
2011	Marat/Sade	Jean-Paul Marat	Royal Shakespeare Theatre, Stratford-upon-Avon	
