= Shapurji Edalji =

British vicar (1841/1842–1918)

Shapurji Edalji (1841/1842 – 23 May 1918) was an Indian-born convert to Anglicanism who was likely the first person from South Asia to be made the vicar of an English parish. His achievements have however been overshadowed by the worldwide fascination with Sir Arthur Conan Doyle’s campaign to prove his son George innocent of wounding a pony in 1903. The popularity of Julian Barnes’s novel Arthur and George (2005) has had the same effect.

== Early life ==
Shapurji Edalji was born in Bombay in 1841 or 1842, the son of Doralji Edalji, a Parsi merchant. He attended the Elphinstone College, where he was taught by Dadabhai Naoroji and was a classmate of Dinshaw Eduljee Wacha, who along with Naoroji, himself a former Elphinstone scholar, became a founder member of the Indian National Congress in Bombay in 1885.

In defiance of his family, Edalji converted to Christianity in 1856, under the influence of Free Kirk missionary John Wilson. He was admitted to the Free Kirk College in Mumbai in 1864. He then worked for a year as a missionary among the pre-literate Warli people before becoming an Anglican. He published a Gujerati and English Dictionary (1863), The Brahma Samaja, which was a lecture to the Bombay Dialectic Association (1864), and a Grammar of the Gujerati Language (1867).

== Life in England ==
In 1866 he travelled to St Augustine's College, Canterbury, to train as a missionary. He stayed in England, however, and was eventually ordained in Oxford. In 1869 he received his first curacy at Burford. Afterwards he was curate at Holy Trinity, Oxford (1869–70), in the Lancashire parishes of Farnworth and Toxteth (1870–72, 1874–5), St Levan, Cornwall (1873–4), and Bromley St Leonard (1875–6).

On 17 June 1874 he married Charlotte Elizabeth Stuart (1842–1924), daughter of Thompson Stoneham, Vicar of Ketley in Shropshire. They had three children: George (1876–1953), Horace (1879–1952 or 1953) and Maud (1882–1961).

In 1876, George Selwyn, the Bishop of Lichfield, appointed Edalji as Vicar of St Mark's church, and the parish of Great Wyrley, Staffordshire, where he served until his death forty-two years later. In securing this position Edalji may well have been the first South Asian to become the incumbent of an English parish. Collieries and agriculture provided the chief employment in the area. A devoted clergyman, though unflinching and sometimes controversial when it came to defending his fundamental principles, he published his Lectures on St Paul's Epistles to the Galatians in 1879. He was on the one hand a fine preacher but on the other sometimes a cause of tension in the parish, for example when he engaged in bitter battles over the future of the local Church of England schools.

== Case of George Edalji ==
The lives of the five Edalji family members were clouded in 1888 by the appearance of a series of abusive letters in Great Wyrley, most of them directed against the Edalji family itself. There was a further flood of offensive letters between 1892 and 1895, and the family was also subject to a series of hoaxes. When the Staffordshire Chief Constable indicated that he suspected George of writing the letters Shapurji argued vehemently in his son's defence. This was also his role after October 1903, when George was convicted of wounding a pony, the 8th of the so-called Wyrley outrages of that year; Shapurji campaigned passionately on his son's behalf, and in 1905 produced a booklet, The Case of George Edalji, which provided a detailed analysis of the woeful police and prosecution case against his son.

== Last years ==
Edalji's eyesight faded in later years, and by the time of the First World War he was having difficulty in seeing at all. His daughter had to lead him to the pulpit during church services. He died on 23 May 1918, five weeks after suffering a cerebral haemorrhage, and was buried in the parish churchyard.
