= Great Wyrley =

Village and civil parish in Staffordshire, England

Coordinates: 52.6593°N 2.0102°W

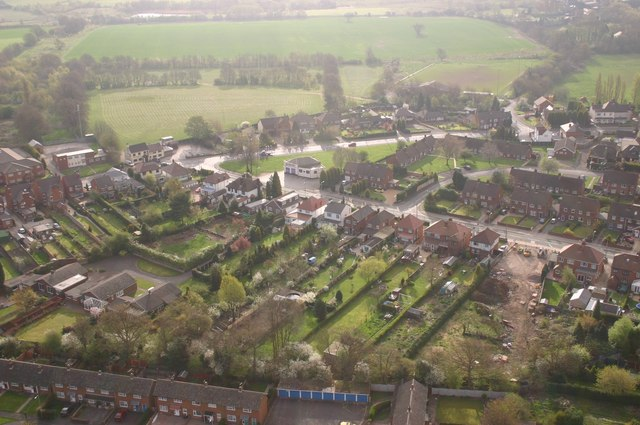
- Aerial view (of part)

- Location within Staffordshire
- Population: 11,060
- OS grid reference: SJ994068
- District: South Staffordshire
- Shire county: Staffordshire
- Region: West Midlands
- Country: England
- Sovereign state: United Kingdom
- Post town: Walsall
- Postcode district: WS6
- Dialling code: 01922
- Police: Staffordshire
- Fire: Staffordshire
- Ambulance: West Midlands
- UK Parliament: Stone, Great Wyrley and Penkridge

Great Wyrley /ˈwɜːrli/ is a village and civil parish in the South Staffordshire district of Staffordshire, England. It forms a built-up area with nearby Cheslyn Hay, Churchbridge, Landywood and Little Wyrley. It lies 6 miles (9.7 km) north of Walsall and a similar distance from Wolverhampton. Cannock is directly north of the village. It had a population of 11,060 at the 2011 census.

== History ==
=== Etymology ===
The word "Wyrley" derives from two Old English words: wir and leah. Wir meant "bog myrtle" and leah meant "woodland clearing", suggesting that Great Wyrley began as sparse woodland or marshland. "Great" refers to its dominant size over Little Wyrley.

=== Early history ===
Great Wyrley is mentioned in the Domesday Book under the name of Wereleia, and as early as 1086 is said to have been indirectly owned by the Bishop of Chester St John's as part of the "somewhat scattered holdings" of the Church of Saint Chad in Lichfield. Some 480 acres (190 ha) of farming land were, assumingly, evenly distributed between Wyrley and nearby Norton Canes. However, all six dependencies of Saint Chad had been labelled as "wasta", which meant they had been abandoned by the time the Domesday Book was made.

=== Post-Industrial Revolution ===
In former times the village was a mining village – The Great Wyrley Colliery – with metalworking (such as for nails, agricultural implements and horseshoes) in outlying areas. The Wyrley and Essington Canal passes nearby.

In 1848 Samuel Lewis included the settlement in his gazetteer and stated it had:

- 799 inhabitants and 1,600 acres (650 ha), of which the Duke of Sutherland owned part;
- Several collieries (Note: "largely employing the population around." Per Lewis, below.);
- The road from Walsall to Cannock passing through the village, long, and consisting of detached houses;
- In 1844, Great Wyrley formed with Cheslyn Hay a new ecclesiastical district, having a population of 1,753;
- St. Mark's Church, a highly finished structure in the early English style, built 1845, at a cost of £2,430, of which sum £1,200 was given by the Rev. William Gresley, prebendary of Lichfield; the remainder was raised by subscription, aided by £333 from the Diocesan, and £250 from the Incorporated Society;
- A perpetual curacy; patrons, the Dean and Chapter of Lichfield;
- A school, purchased from the Independents (Nonconformists), was opened in 1843 which cross-references the gazetteer entry Cannock.

In 1876 Shapurji Edalji was appointed Vicar of Great Wyrley; he served until his death forty-two years later. A Parsi convert to Christianity from Bombay, he may well have been the first South Asian to become the incumbent of an English parish.

=== Great Wyrley Outrages ===
In 1903, the village was the scene of the Great Wyrley Outrages, a series of slashings of horses, cows and sheep. In October, a local solicitor and son of the parson, George Edalji, was tried and convicted for the eighth attack, on a pit pony, and sentenced to seven years with hard labour. Edalji's family had been the victims of a long-running campaign of untraceable abusive letters and anonymous harassment in 1888 and 1892–1895. Further letters, in 1903, alleged he was partially responsible for the outrages and caused the police suspicion to focus on him.

Edalji was released in 1906 after the Chief Justice of the Bahamas and others had pleaded his case but he was not pardoned, and the police kept him under surveillance. Sir Arthur Conan Doyle of Sherlock Holmes fame was persuaded to "turn detective" to prove the man's innocence. This he achieved after eight months of work. Edalji was exonerated by a Home Office committee of enquiry, although no compensation was awarded.

Local myth remembers the Outrages to have been enacted by "The Wyrley Gang", although Doyle believed that they were the work of a single person, a local butcher's boy and sometime sailor called Royden Sharp. Ironically, Doyle's suspicion was based on circumstantial evidence. It was an over-reliance on this type of evidence in the first place which had resulted in Edalji's flawed conviction.

Poison pen letters in the name of the "Wyrley Gang" continued for another twenty-five years, but these were subsequently discovered to have been posted from outside the town by Enoch Knowles of Wednesbury, who was arrested and convicted in 1934.

This case has been related or retold:

- Doyle's The Story of Mr. George Edalji (1907, expanded re-issue in 1985).
- 1972 BBC anthology series The Edwardians: Arthur Conan Doyle (one episode) centres on his involvement in the Edalji case. Written by Jeremy Paul and directed by Brian Farnham, it stars Nigel Davenport as Doyle, Sam Dastor as George Edalji, and Renu Setna as the Reverend Edalji.
- Arthur & George by Julian Barnes (2005), nominated that year for the Man Booker Prize. In 2010, Arthur & George was adapted for the theatre by David Edgar and, in 2015, for a three-part British television drama of the same title.
- A comprehensive non-fictional account Conan Doyle and the Parson's Son: The George Edalji Case by Gordon Weaver (2006).
- In Roger Oldfield's book Outrage: The Edalji Five and the Shadow of Sherlock Holmes, Vanguard Press (2010), the case is set within the context of the wider experiences of the Edalji family as a whole. Oldfield taught history at Great Wyrley High School.

== Governance ==
There is one representative on Staffordshire County Council, Reform UK's Michelle Woods whose ward is called Great Wyrley and Essington. There are four representatives on South Staffordshire District Council:

Member Since	Member	Ward
1995	Kath Perry MBE	Great Wyrley Town
2023	Matthew Jackson	Great Wyrley Town
2007	Ray Perry	Great Wyrley Landywood
2025	Joe Hill	Great Wyrley Landywood

Great Wyrley has been within a safe Conservative seat since at least 1983. It is in the constituency of Stone, Great Wyrley and Penkridge, and the current MP is Gavin Williamson, who was first elected for the new seat in 2024, having previously been the MP for South Staffordshire since 2010, of which Great Wyrley used to be part of prior to boundary changes.

Great Wyrley has a parish council, the lowest tier of local government. Its eleven councillors represent three wards: Landywood ward (five councillors), North ward (2), and Town ward (4).

== Localities ==
Great Wyrley can be divided into two South Staffordshire wards: "Great Wyrley Town" and "Great Wyrley Landywood," the latter being home to the slightly more southern area of Landywood. In 2022, plans were approved for a new housing development on the Landywood Lane green belt, despite objections from local residents. The estate will border Cheslyn Hay. The settlement of Little Wyrley lies within the parish of Norton Canes – a nearby village.

Great Wyrley lies just under two-and-a-half miles south of Cannock town centre, just under two miles east of Cheslyn Hay, and three-and-a-half miles north of Bloxwich town centre.

== Schools ==
Great Wyrley has three primary schools and one high school:

- Landywood Primary School
- Moat Hall Primary School
- St Thomas More Primary School
- Great Wyrley Academy

== Places of worship ==
Great Wyrley has two Church of England parish churches, St Mark's Church, built in 1845 in the Early English style, and St Andrew's Church, Landywood, built in 1966 on the Quinton estate. They work together under the name of "Great Wyrley Parish Churches", and there is a single ecclesiastical parish of "St Mark and St Andrew, Great Wyrley", within the Diocese of Lichfield.

Great Wyrley Methodist Church, sometimes known as Great Wyrley Wesley Methodist Church was built in 1925 to replace two older Methodist churches. It is locally listed at grade A, and is part of the Cannock Chase Methodist Circuit, along with Upper Landywood Methodist Church. Upper Landywood Methodist Church is locally listed at grade B and noted as "Small, distinctive, 19thc chapel built by volunteers".

== Transport ==
Road

Great Wyrley economically is largely a dormitory for commuters to Birmingham and Wolverhampton, and as a midpoint between Birmingham and Stafford, or Walsall and Cannock more locally; by the parish boundaries are junctions T7 on the M6 Toll motorway and 11 of the M6.

Rail

Landywood railway station provides services south to Birmingham New Street and north to Rugeley Trent Valley. Wyrley and Cheslyn Hay railway station to the north of Landywood closed in the 1960s (see also: Beeching Report).

Buses

Great Wyrley is served by three bus routes running between Huntington, Cannock, Walsall, Wolverhampton and Birmingham operated by Chaserider and National Express West Midlands:

- Chaserider service 1 (Huntington - Great Wyrley)
- Chaserider service 71 (Cannock - Essington - Wolverhampton)
- National Express West Midlands service X51 (Cannock - Walsall - Birmingham)

Prior to 2008, the area was largely covered by West Midlands Travel and Chase Bus. The area was adopted by Arriva Midlands under the 'Chase Linx' brand which became 'Sapphire'. In 2020, Arriva's Cannock depot was brought by D&G Bus under the Chaserider brand who took over service 1 (from Arriva) and 71 (from Select Bus).

Route X51 is based on the old 351 and 951 services over 10 years ago, but reduced to peak time only for many years. In April 2019 when a new timetable launched to run all day between Cannock and Birmingham via Great Wyrley. This prompted the eventual withdrawal of Arriva Midlands service 1 in 2020. It was relaunched by predecessor Chaserider in 2021, but was soon curtailed as a Wyrley circular and no longer continuing to Walsall. Now service X51 provides the only bus link to Walsall through the village.

== Sport ==
=== Association football ===
Great Wyrley F.C. was a football club based in Great Wyrley between 1980 and 2007

=== Table tennis ===
Great Wyrley Tennis Club is based on Norton Lane, Great Wyrley. Currently the club plays in the Walsall Table Tennis Leagues

== Notable people ==
- William Brownlow (1830–1901) in 1853 was appointed Curate of Great Wyrley, ultimately Roman Catholic Bishop of Clifton
- Shapurji Edalji (1841/1842-1918), Vicar of Great Wyrley 1876-1918
- John Walker (1899–1971) an English footballer who played for Stoke and Walsall, was born in the village
- Ronnie Allen (1929–2001) an English international footballer 1946–1964, making 638 appearances, was born in Great Wyrley
- Maurice Herriott (born 1939) a British track and field athlete who competed mainly in the 3000 metres steeplechase, competed in the 1964 and 1968 Summer Olympics, was born in the village
- Mike Foster (born 1963) a former Labour Party politician and MP for Worcester 1997–2010, was educated at Great Wyrley High School
- Melody Hossaini (born 1984) a social entrepreneur, a professional speaker and personal development trainer and coach, was educated at Great Wyrley High School

== Listed building ==
The parish contains one listed building, Landywood Farmhouse, which is designated at Grade II, the lowest of the three grades, which is applied to "buildings of national importance and special interest". The farmhouse dates from the early 16th century and has a timber framed core on a sandstone plinth and a tile roof. It was altered and extended in the 19th century, the additions are in red brick and have been roughcast. There are two storeys and an attic, and a T-shaped plan, and the windows are casements with segmental heads.

== Notes and references ==
Notes
