= Churchbridge, Staffordshire =

Civil parish in Staffordshire, England

Churchbridge is a civil parish in the South Staffordshire District of Staffordshire, England. It is situated on the A34 & A5 between Cannock and Great Wyrley.
