= List of United Kingdom locations: On-Oz =

The United Kingdom

This is part of the list of United Kingdom locations: a gazetteer of place names in the United Kingdom showing each place's locality and geographical coordinates.

== On ==
Location	Locality	Coordinates (links to map & photo sources)	OS grid reference
Onchan	Isle of Man	54.17°N 04.46°W	SC3978
Onecote	Staffordshire	53.09°N 01.94°W	SK0455
Onehouse	Suffolk	52.19°N 00.95°E	TM0259
Onen	Sir Fynwy (Monmouthshire)	51.82°N 02.82°W	SO4314
Onesacre	Sheffield	53.43°N 01.56°W	SK2993
Onibury	Shropshire	52.40°N 02.80°W	SO4579
Onich	Highland	56.69°N 05.23°W	NN0261
Onllwyn	Castellnedd Phort Talbot (Neath Port Talbot)	51.77°N 03.68°W	SN8410
Onneley	Staffordshire	52.98°N 02.37°W	SJ7543
Onslow Village	Surrey	51.23°N 00.61°W	SU9749
Onthank	East Ayrshire	55.62°N 04.51°W	NS4240

== Op ==
Location	Locality	Coordinates (links to map & photo sources)	OS grid reference
Openshaw	Manchester	53.47°N 02.18°W	SJ8897
Openwoodgate	Derbyshire	53.01°N 01.46°W	SK3647
Opinan	Highland	57.68°N 05.79°W	NG7472

== Or ==
Location	Locality	Coordinates (links to map & photo sources)	OS grid reference
Oran	Moray	57.63°N 02.98°W	NJ4161
Orange Row	Norfolk	52.75°N 00.28°E	TF5420
Orasaigh / Orinsay	Western Isles	58.01°N 06.47°W	NB3612
Orbiston	North Lanarkshire	55.80°N 04.02°W	NS7359
Orby	Lincolnshire	53.17°N 00.22°E	TF4967
Orchard Hill	Devon	51.02°N 04.21°W	SS4527
Orchard Park	Cambridgeshire	52.233°N 0.119°E	TL4561
Orchard Leigh	Buckinghamshire	51.71°N 00.58°W	SP9803
Orchard Portman	Somerset	50.98°N 03.08°W	ST2421
Orcheston	Wiltshire	51.20°N 01.92°W	SU0545
Orcop	Herefordshire	51.93°N 02.77°W	SO4726
Orcop Hill	Herefordshire	51.94°N 02.77°W	SO4728
Ord (Ross and Cromarty)	Highland	57.70°N 04.16°W	NH7170
Ord (Skye)	Highland	57.14°N 05.95°W	NG6113
Ordale	Shetland Islands	60.74°N 00.84°W	HP6307
Ordhead	Aberdeenshire	57.18°N 02.56°W	NJ6610
Ordie	Aberdeenshire	57.09°N 02.90°W	NJ4501
Ordiquhill	Aberdeenshire	57.58°N 02.73°W	NJ5655
Ordley	Northumberland	54.92°N 02.09°W	NY9459
Ord Mill	Aberdeenshire	57.24°N 02.54°W	NJ6717
Ordsall	Nottinghamshire	53.31°N 00.96°W	SK6980
Ordsall	Salford	53.46°N 02.28°W	SJ8197
Ore	East Sussex	50.86°N 00.59°E	TQ8311
Oreston	Devon	50.35°N 04.11°W	SX5053
Oreton	Shropshire	52.41°N 02.51°W	SO6580
Orfasay	Shetland Islands	60.47°N 01.10°W	HU492774
Orford	Cheshire	53.40°N 02.58°W	SJ6190
Orford	Suffolk	52.08°N 01.53°E	TM4249
Orford Ness	Suffolk	52.09°N 01.57°E	TM451496
Organford	Dorset	50.72°N 02.10°W	SY9392
Orgreave	Sheffield	53.37°N 01.38°W	SK4187
Orgreave	Staffordshire	52.74°N 01.79°W	SK1416
Oridge Street	Gloucestershire	51.94°N 02.32°W	SO7827
Orkney	Orkney Islands	58.98°N 03.18°W	HY322119
Orlandon	Sir Benfro (Pembrokeshire)	51.73°N 05.17°W	SM8109
Orleton	Herefordshire	52.29°N 02.74°W	SO4967
Orleton	Worcestershire	52.30°N 02.45°W	SO6967
Orleton Common	Herefordshire	52.30°N 02.77°W	SO4768
Orlingbury	Northamptonshire	52.33°N 00.73°W	SP8672
Ormacleit	Western Isles	57.25°N 07.40°W	NF7431
Ormal	Shetland Islands	60.36°N 01.81°W	HU103648
Ormathwaite	Cumbria	54.61°N 03.14°W	NY2625
Ormesby	Redcar and Cleveland	54.54°N 01.18°W	NZ5317
Ormesby St Margaret	Norfolk	52.67°N 01.68°E	TG4915
Ormesby St Michael	Norfolk	52.66°N 01.66°E	TG4814
Ormiscaig	Highland	57.84°N 05.62°W	NG8590
Ormiston	East Lothian	55.91°N 02.94°W	NT4169
Ormiston	Scottish Borders	55.40°N 02.75°W	NT5213
Ormsaigbeg	Highland	56.69°N 06.13°W	NM4763
Ormsaigmore	Highland	56.69°N 06.13°W	NM4763
Ormsary	Argyll and Bute	55.88°N 05.61°W	NR7472
Ormsgill	Cumbria	54.12°N 03.24°W	SD1971
Ormskirk	Lancashire	53.56°N 02.89°W	SD4108
Ornish Island	Western Isles	57.32°N 07.21°W	NF860383
Ornsay	Highland	57.14°N 05.78°W	NG711124
Ornsby Hill	Durham	54.82°N 01.75°W	NZ1648
Oronsay	Argyll and Bute	56.01°N 06.24°W	NR357888
Oronsay (Loch Bracadale)	Highland	57.33°N 06.45°W	NG318358
Oronsay (Loch Sunart)	Highland	56.66°N 05.92°W	NM594589
Oronsay (Outer Hebrides)	Western Isles	57.65°N 07.29°W	NF845755
Orosay (South Uist)	Western Isles	57.12°N 07.40°W	NF729172
Orosay (Barra)	Western Isles	57.02°N 07.41°W	NF717061
Orpington	Bromley	51.36°N 00.08°E	TQ4565
Orrell	Sefton	53.45°N 02.99°W	SJ3496
Orrell	Wigan	53.53°N 02.71°W	SD5305
Orrell Post	Wigan	53.53°N 02.71°W	SD5304
Orrisdale	Isle of Man	54.30°N 04.58°W	SC3293
Orrock	Fife	56.07°N 03.25°W	NT2288
Orsay	Argyll and Bute	55.67°N 06.51°W	NR163516
Orsett	Essex	51.50°N 00.36°E	TQ6481
Orsett Heath	Essex	51.48°N 00.34°E	TQ6379
Orslow	Staffordshire	52.73°N 02.29°W	SJ8015
Orston	Nottinghamshire	52.95°N 00.85°W	SK7740
Orthwaite	Cumbria	54.69°N 03.16°W	NY2534
Ortner	Lancashire	53.98°N 02.71°W	SD5354
Orton	Cumbria	54.46°N 02.58°W	NY6208
Orton	Moray	57.56°N 03.15°W	NJ3153
Orton	Northamptonshire	52.40°N 00.82°W	SP8079
Orton	Staffordshire	52.55°N 02.20°W	SO8695
Orton Brimbles	Cambridgeshire	52.55°N 00.30°W	TL1596
Orton Goldhay	Cambridgeshire	52.54°N 00.30°W	TL1595
Orton Longueville	Cambridgeshire	52.54°N 00.29°W	TL1696
Orton Malborne	Cambridgeshire	52.54°N 00.27°W	TL1795
Orton on the Hill	Leicestershire	52.62°N 01.55°W	SK3003
Orton Rigg	Cumbria	54.85°N 03.04°W	NY3352
Orton Southgate	Cambridgeshire	52.53°N 00.32°W	TL1494
Orton Waterville	Cambridgeshire	52.55°N 00.30°W	TL1596
Orton Wistow	Cambridgeshire	52.55°N 00.31°W	TL1496
Orwell	Cambridgeshire	52.13°N 00.01°W	TL3650

== Os ==
Location	Locality	Coordinates (links to map & photo sources)	OS grid reference
Osbaldeston	Lancashire	53.77°N 02.54°W	SD6431
Osbaldeston Green	Lancashire	53.78°N 02.54°W	SD6432
Osbaldwick	York	53.95°N 01.04°W	SE6351
Osbaston	Leicestershire	52.63°N 01.38°W	SK4204
Osbaston (Telford)	Shropshire	52.75°N 02.60°W	SJ5918
Osbaston (Oswestry)	Shropshire	52.79°N 03.00°W	SJ3222
Osbaston Hollow	Leicestershire	52.65°N 01.39°W	SK4106
Osbournby	Lincolnshire	52.92°N 00.42°W	TF0638
Oscroft	Cheshire	53.18°N 02.74°W	SJ5066
Ose	Highland	57.38°N 06.47°W	NG3141
Osea Island	Essex	51.72°N 00.76°E	TL9106
Osehill Green	Dorset	50.87°N 02.48°W	ST6609
Osgathorpe	Leicestershire	52.76°N 01.36°W	SK4319
Osgodby	Lincolnshire	53.41°N 00.39°W	TF0792
Osgodby (by the Sea)	North Yorkshire	54.24°N 00.38°W	TA055845
Osgodby (Barlby with Osgodby)	North Yorkshire	53.79°N 01.03°W	SE6433
Osgodby Common	North Yorkshire	53.80°N 01.02°W	SE6435
Osidge	Barnet	51.63°N 00.15°W	TQ2894
Oskaig	Highland	57.36°N 06.09°W	NG5438
Osleston	Derbyshire	52.92°N 01.64°W	SK2436
Osmaston	City of Derby	52.89°N 01.46°W	SK3633
Osmaston	Derbyshire	52.98°N 01.70°W	SK2043
Osmington	Dorset	50.64°N 02.39°W	SY7283
Osmington Mills	Dorset	50.62°N 02.38°W	SY7381
Osmondthorpe	Leeds	53.79°N 01.51°W	SE3233
Osmotherley	North Yorkshire	54.36°N 01.30°W	SE4597
Osnaburgh (Dairsie)	Fife	56.34°N 02.95°W	NO4117
Osney	Oxfordshire	51.75°N 01.27°W	SP5006
Ospisdale	Highland	57.87°N 04.17°W	NH7189
Ospringe	Kent	51.30°N 00.86°E	TR0060
Ossemsley	Hampshire	50.78°N 01.67°W	SZ2398
Ossett	Wakefield	53.67°N 01.57°W	SE2820
Ossett Spa	Wakefield	53.66°N 01.56°W	SE2919
Ossett Street Side	Wakefield	53.68°N 01.59°W	SE2721
Ossington	Nottinghamshire	53.16°N 00.87°W	SK7564
Ostend	Essex	51.63°N 00.78°E	TQ9397
Ostend	Norfolk	52.83°N 01.50°E	TG3632
Osterley	Hounslow	51.48°N 00.35°W	TQ1477
Oswaldkirk	North Yorkshire	54.19°N 01.05°W	SE6278
Oswaldtwistle	Lancashire	53.73°N 02.41°W	SD7327
Oswestry (Croeswallt)	Shropshire	52.85°N 03.05°W	SJ2929

== Ot ==
Location	Locality	Coordinates (links to map & photo sources)	OS grid reference
Otby	Lincolnshire	53.42°N 00.30°W	TF1393
Oteley	Shropshire	52.90°N 02.87°W	SJ4134
Otford	Kent	51.31°N 00.16°E	TQ5159
Otham	Kent	51.24°N 00.56°E	TQ7953
Otham Hole	Kent	51.23°N 00.57°E	TQ8052
Otherton	Staffordshire	52.70°N 02.11°W	SJ9212
Othery	Somerset	51.07°N 02.88°W	ST3831
Otley	Leeds	53.90°N 01.69°W	SE2045
Otley	Suffolk	52.14°N 01.21°E	TM2055
Otterbourne	Hampshire	51.00°N 01.34°W	SU4623
Otterburn	North Yorkshire	54.00°N 02.18°W	SD8857
Otterburn	Northumberland	55.23°N 02.19°W	NY8893
Otterburn Camp	Northumberland	55.24°N 02.17°W	NY8995
Otterden Place	Kent	51.25°N 00.77°E	TQ9454
Otter Ferry	Argyll and Bute	56.00°N 05.32°W	NR9384
Otterford	Somerset	50.92°N 03.11°W	ST2214
Otterham	Cornwall	50.68°N 04.60°W	SX1690
Otterhampton	Somerset	51.18°N 03.08°W	ST2443
Otterham Quay	Kent	51.36°N 00.62°E	TQ8366
Otterham Station	Cornwall	50.67°N 04.61°W	SX1589
Ottershaw	Surrey	51.35°N 00.53°W	TQ0263
Otterspool	Liverpool	53.35°N 02.94°W	SJ3785
Otterswick	Shetland Islands	60.54°N 01.05°W	HU5285
Otterton	Devon	50.65°N 03.30°W	SY0885
Otterwood	Hampshire	50.81°N 01.41°W	SU4102
Ottery St Mary	Devon	50.74°N 03.27°W	SY1095
Ottinge	Kent	51.13°N 01.08°E	TR1642
Ottringham	East Riding of Yorkshire	53.69°N 00.09°W	TA2624

== Ou ==
Location	Locality	Coordinates (links to map & photo sources)	OS grid reference
Oughterby	Cumbria	54.88°N 03.10°W	NY2955
Oughtershaw	North Yorkshire	54.22°N 02.21°W	SD8681
Oughterside	Cumbria	54.74°N 03.38°W	NY1140
Oughtibridge	Sheffield	53.43°N 01.54°W	SK3093
Oughtrington	Cheshire	53.37°N 02.46°W	SJ6987
Oulston	North Yorkshire	54.15°N 01.17°W	SE5474
Oulton	Cumbria	54.83°N 03.18°W	NY2450
Oulton	Leeds	53.74°N 01.45°W	SE3628
Oulton	Norbury, Staffordshire	52.79°N 02.32°W	SJ7822
Oulton	Norfolk	52.80°N 01.15°E	TG1328
Oulton	Staffordshire	52.91°N 02.13°W	SJ9135
Oulton	Suffolk	52.48°N 01.71°E	TM5294
Oulton Broad	Suffolk	52.46°N 01.69°E	TM5192
Oultoncross	Staffordshire	52.90°N 02.15°W	SJ9034
Oulton Grange	Staffordshire	52.91°N 02.15°W	SJ9035
Oulton Heath	Staffordshire	52.92°N 02.15°W	SJ9036
Oulton Street	Norfolk	52.79°N 01.18°E	TG1527
Oundle	Northamptonshire	52.48°N 00.48°W	TL0388
Ounsdale	Staffordshire	52.53°N 02.20°W	SO8693
Ousby	Cumbria	54.70°N 02.59°W	NY6234
Ousden	Suffolk	52.20°N 00.54°E	TL7459 }
Ousefleet	East Riding of Yorkshire	53.69°N 00.75°W	SE8223
Ousel Hole	Bradford	53.87°N 01.84°W	SE1042
Ousethorpe	East Riding of Yorkshire	53.95°N 00.76°W	SE8151
Ouston	Durham	54.88°N 01.61°W	NZ2554
Ouston (Ninebanks)	Northumberland	54.86°N 02.35°W	NY7752
Ouston (Stamford)	Northumberland	55.02°N 01.89°W	NZ0770
Outcast	Cumbria	54.18°N 03.07°W	SD3077
Out Elmstead	Kent	51.20°N 01.14°E	TR2050
Outer Hebrides	Western Isles	58.14°N 06.71°W	NB227272
Outer Heisker	Western Isles	56.84°N 07.62°W	NL573867
Outer Holm of Skaw	Shetland Islands	60.38°N 00.91°W	HU600674
Outer Hope	Devon	50.24°N 03.86°W	SX6740
Outertown	Orkney Islands	58.97°N 03.34°W	HY2310
Outgate	Cumbria	54.38°N 03.00°W	SD3599
Outhgill	Cumbria	54.40°N 02.34°W	NY7801
Outhill	Warwickshire	52.29°N 01.85°W	SP1066
Outlands	Staffordshire	52.86°N 02.34°W	SJ7730
Outlane	Calderdale	53.65°N 01.88°W	SE0818
Outlane Moor	Calderdale	53.64°N 01.89°W	SE0717
Outlet Village (Cheshire Oaks Designer Outlet)	Cheshire	53.26°N 02.88°W	SJ4174
Outmarsh	Wiltshire	51.34°N 02.15°W	ST8961
Out Newton	East Riding of Yorkshire	53.66°N 00.08°E	TA3821
Out Rawcliffe	Lancashire	53.86°N 02.91°W	SD4041
Out Skerries	Shetland Islands	60.40°N 00.79°W	HU665696
Out Stack	Shetland Islands	60.86°N 00.87°W	HP612202
Outwell	Norfolk	52.60°N 00.22°E	TF5103
Outwick	Hampshire	50.95°N 01.80°W	SU1417
Outwood	Bolton	53.54°N 02.34°W	SD7705
Outwood	Somerset	51.04°N 03.00°W	ST3028
Outwood	Surrey	51.18°N 00.11°W	TQ3245
Outwood	Wakefield	53.70°N 01.51°W	SE3223
Outwoods (near Coleorton)	Leicestershire	52.75°N 01.40°W	SK4018
Outwoods (Stafford)	Staffordshire	52.75°N 02.32°W	SJ7818
Outwoods (East Staffordshire)	Staffordshire	52.81°N 01.66°W	SK2324
Outwoods	Warwickshire	52.45°N 01.64°W	SP2484
Ouzlewell Green	Leeds	53.72°N 01.50°W	SE3326

== Ov ==
Location	Locality	Coordinates (links to map & photo sources)	OS grid reference
Ovenden	Calderdale	53.73°N 01.89°W	SE0727
Over	Cambridgeshire	52.31°N 00.01°E	TL3770
Over	Cheshire	53.18°N 02.55°W	SJ6365
Over	Gloucestershire	51.86°N 02.27°W	SO8119
Over	South Gloucestershire	51.53°N 02.60°W	ST5882
Overbister	Orkney Islands	59.24°N 02.56°W	HY6840
Over Burrow	Lancashire	54.17°N 02.59°W	SD6176
Over Burrows	Derbyshire	52.94°N 01.61°W	SK2639
Overbury	Worcestershire	52.03°N 02.07°W	SO9537
Overcombe	Dorset	50.63°N 02.43°W	SY6982
Over Compton	Dorset	50.94°N 02.58°W	ST5916
Overend	Dudley	52.45°N 02.07°W	SO9584
Over End	Cambridgeshire	52.52°N 00.39°W	TL0993
Over End	Derbyshire	53.24°N 01.62°W	SK2572
Over Finlarg	Angus	56.55°N 02.96°W	NO4141
Over Green	Birmingham	52.54°N 01.76°W	SP1694
Over Haddon	Derbyshire	53.19°N 01.70°W	SK2066
Overhill	Aberdeenshire	57.56°N 02.20°W	NJ8853
Over Hulton	Bolton	53.54°N 02.48°W	SD6805
Over Kellet	Lancashire	54.11°N 02.73°W	SD5269
Over Kiddington	Oxfordshire	51.89°N 01.42°W	SP4022
Over Knutsford	Cheshire	53.29°N 02.36°W	SJ7678
Over Langshaw	Scottish Borders	55.65°N 02.76°W	NT5240
Overleigh	Somerset	51.11°N 02.74°W	ST4835
Overley	Staffordshire	52.73°N 01.76°W	SK1615
Over Monnow	Sir Fynwy (Monmouthshire)	51.80°N 02.72°W	SO5012
Overmoor	Staffordshire	53.02°N 02.06°W	SJ9647
Over Norton	Oxfordshire	51.94°N 01.55°W	SP3128
Over Peover	Cheshire	53.25°N 02.33°W	SJ7873
Overpool	Cheshire	53.28°N 02.93°W	SJ3877
Overs	Shropshire	52.55°N 02.90°W	SO3996
Overseal	Derbyshire	52.73°N 01.57°W	SK2915
Over Silton	North Yorkshire	54.33°N 01.30°W	SE4593
Overslade	Warwickshire	52.35°N 01.28°W	SP4973
Oversland	Kent	51.27°N 00.93°E	TR0557
Oversley Green	Warwickshire	52.20°N 01.86°W	SP0956
Overstone	Northamptonshire	52.28°N 00.82°W	SP8066
Over Stowey	Somerset	51.13°N 03.17°W	ST1838
Overstrand	Norfolk	52.91°N 01.33°E	TG2440
Over Stratton	Somerset	50.93°N 02.81°W	ST4315
Over Tabley	Cheshire	53.31°N 02.42°W	SJ7280
Overthorpe	Kirklees	53.65°N 01.63°W	SE2418
Overthorpe	Northamptonshire	52.05°N 01.30°W	SP4840
Overton	City of Aberdeen	57.21°N 02.21°W	NJ8714
Overton	Abertawe (Swansea)	51.54°N 04.22°W	SS4685
Overton	Cheshire	53.28°N 02.72°W	SJ5277
Overton	Gloucestershire	51.78°N 02.40°W	SO7210
Overton	Hampshire	51.23°N 01.27°W	SU5149
Overton	Inverclyde	55.92°N 04.78°W	NS2674
Overton	Lancashire	54.01°N 02.87°W	SD4358
Overton	North Yorkshire	53.98°N 01.16°W	SE5555
Overton	Shropshire	52.34°N 02.73°W	SO5072
Overton	Staffordshire	52.93°N 01.94°W	SK0438
Overton	Wakefield	53.64°N 01.60°W	SE2616
Overton (Owrtyn / Overton-on-Dee)	Wrecsam (Wrexham)	52.96°N 02.93°W	SJ3741
Overton Bridge	Wrecsam (Wrexham)	52.97°N 02.96°W	SJ3542
Over Town	Lancashire	53.75°N 02.19°W	SD8729
Overtown	Lancashire	54.17°N 02.58°W	SD6276
Overtown	North Lanarkshire	55.74°N 03.91°W	NS8052
Overtown	Swindon	51.50°N 01.78°W	SU1579
Overtown	Wakefield	53.63°N 01.47°W	SE3516
Over Wallop	Hampshire	51.14°N 01.60°W	SU2838
Over Whitacre	Warwickshire	52.50°N 01.63°W	SP2590
Over Worton	Oxfordshire	51.95°N 01.37°W	SP4329
Oving	Buckinghamshire	51.88°N 00.86°W	SP7821
Oving	West Sussex	50.82°N 00.72°W	SU9004
Ovingdean	Brighton and Hove	50.81°N 00.08°W	TQ3503
Ovingham	Northumberland	54.96°N 01.87°W	NZ0863
Ovington	Durham	54.52°N 01.80°W	NZ1314
Ovington	Essex	52.04°N 00.56°E	TL7642
Ovington	Hampshire	51.07°N 01.20°W	SU5631
Ovington	Norfolk	52.58°N 00.83°E	TF9202
Ovington	Northumberland	54.96°N 01.90°W	NZ0663

== Ow ==
Location	Locality	Coordinates (links to map & photo sources)	OS grid reference
Owen's Bank	Staffordshire	52.84°N 01.70°W	SK2028
Ower	Hampshire	50.94°N 01.54°W	SU3216
Owermoigne	Dorset	50.66°N 02.34°W	SY7685
Owlcotes	Derbyshire	53.19°N 01.34°W	SK4467
Owl End	Cambridgeshire	52.35°N 00.20°W	TL2275
Owler Bar	Derbyshire	53.29°N 01.56°W	SK2978
Owlerton	Sheffield	53.39°N 01.50°W	SK3389
Owlet	Bradford	53.82°N 01.77°W	SE1536
Owlpen	Gloucestershire	51.68°N 02.29°W	ST8098
Owlsmoor	Berkshire	51.35°N 00.78°W	SU8562
Owlswick	Buckinghamshire	51.74°N 00.87°W	SP7806
Owlthorpe	Sheffield	53.33°N 01.38°W	SK4182
Owmby	Lincolnshire	53.52°N 00.38°W	TA0704
Owmby-by-Spital	Lincolnshire	53.37°N 00.49°W	TF0087
Ownham	Berkshire	51.42°N 01.39°W	SU4270
Owrtyn	Wrexham	52.96°N 02.93°W	SJ3741
Owslebury	Hampshire	51.00°N 01.27°W	SU5123
Owsthorpe	East Riding of Yorkshire	53.77°N 00.77°W	SE810309
Owston	Doncaster	53.59°N 01.17°W	SE5511
Owston	Leicestershire	52.65°N 00.86°W	SK7707
Owston Ferry	North Lincolnshire	53.49°N 00.79°W	SE8000
Owstwick	East Riding of Yorkshire	53.76°N 00.07°W	TA2732
Owthorne	East Riding of Yorkshire	53.73°N 00.01°E	TA3328
Owthorpe	Nottinghamshire	52.89°N 01.00°W	SK6733
Owton Manor	Hartlepool	54.65°N 01.24°W	NZ4929

== Ox ==
Location	Locality	Coordinates (links to map & photo sources)	OS grid reference
Oxborough	Norfolk	52.57°N 00.56°E	TF7401
Oxbridge	Dorset	50.77°N 02.75°W	SY4797
Oxclose	Derbyshire	53.31°N 01.35°W	SK4380
Oxclose	Sunderland	54.89°N 01.54°W	NZ2956
Oxcombe	Lincolnshire	53.27°N 00.03°W	TF3177
Oxcroft	Derbyshire	53.25°N 01.28°W	SK4873
Oxcroft Estate	Derbyshire	53.25°N 01.28°W	SK4873
Oxen End	Essex	51.93°N 00.41°E	TL6629
Oxenhall	Gloucestershire	51.93°N 02.42°W	SO7126
Oxenholme	Cumbria	54.29°N 02.72°W	SD5389
Oxenhope	Bradford	53.81°N 01.95°W	SE0335
Oxen Park	Cumbria	54.27°N 03.06°W	SD3187
Oxenpill	Somerset	51.16°N 02.80°W	ST4441
Oxenton	Gloucestershire	51.97°N 02.07°W	SO9531
Oxenwood	Wiltshire	51.32°N 01.57°W	SU3059
Oxford	Oxfordshire	51.75°N 01.26°W	SP5106
Oxford	City of Stoke-on-Trent	53.07°N 02.19°W	SJ8753
Oxgang	East Dunbartonshire	55.93°N 04.14°W	NS6673
Oxgangs	City of Edinburgh	55.89°N 03.23°W	NT2368
Oxhey	Hertfordshire	51.64°N 00.38°W	TQ1295
Oxhill	Durham	54.86°N 01.72°W	NZ1852
Oxhill	Warwickshire	52.10°N 01.54°W	SP3145
Oxlease	Hertfordshire	51.74°N 00.23°W	TL2207
Oxley	Wolverhampton	52.60°N 02.13°W	SJ9101
Oxley Green	Essex	51.79°N 00.76°E	TL9114
Oxley's Green	East Sussex	50.96°N 00.40°E	TQ6921
Oxlode	Cambridgeshire	52.45°N 00.17°E	TL4886
Oxna	Shetland Islands	60.11°N 01.37°W	HU347372
Oxnam	Scottish Borders	55.45°N 02.49°W	NT6918
Oxnead	Norfolk	52.76°N 01.30°E	TG2324
Oxshott	Surrey	51.32°N 00.36°W	TQ1460
Oxspring	Barnsley	53.51°N 01.60°W	SE2602
Oxted	Surrey	51.25°N 00.02°W	TQ3852
Oxton	North Yorkshire	53.88°N 01.24°W	SE5043
Oxton	Nottinghamshire	53.05°N 01.06°W	SK6351
Oxton	Scottish Borders	55.76°N 02.81°W	NT4953
Oxton	Wirral	53.37°N 03.06°W	SJ2987
Oxton Rakes	Derbyshire	53.25°N 01.52°W	SK3273
Oxwich	Abertawe (Swansea)	51.55°N 04.17°W	SS4986
Oxwich Green	Abertawe (Swansea)	51.55°N 04.17°W	SS4986
Oxwick	Norfolk	52.78°N 00.83°E	TF9124

== Oy ==
Location	Locality	Coordinates (links to map & photo sources)	OS grid reference
Oyne	Aberdeenshire	57.31°N 02.54°W	NJ6725
Oystermouth	Abertawe (Swansea)	51.57°N 04.00°W	SS6188

== Oz ==
Location	Locality	Coordinates (links to map & photo sources)	OS grid reference
Ozleworth	Gloucestershire	51.63°N 02.30°W	ST7993
