= List of windmills in Staffordshire =

This is a list of windmills in the English county of Staffordshire.

== Locations ==
=== A - B ===
Location	Name of mill and grid reference	Type	Maps	First mention or built	Last mention or demise	Photograph
Audley	Approximately; SK 827 544	Tower		1796	1860, gone by 1899	
Bilston	Bilston Mill; SO 954 967	Post	1686	1686	1771	
Bilston	Mount Pleasant Mill; SO 954 967	Tower		1791	Demolished early 1960s	
Blakenall Heath	Approximately; SK 000 025	Post	1686; 1693; 1747; 1775; 1787	1686	1787	
Blakenhall Heath	Approximately; SK 000 022	Post	1686; 1693; 1747; 1775; 1787	1686	1787	
Blakenhall Heath	Bloxwich Mill (one of above two sites)			1816	1853	
Bloxwich	Little Bloxwich Mill approximately SJ 997 018	Post	1682	1609	1682	
Bloxwich	Great Bloxwich Mill	Post	1682; 1775	1682	c. 1812	
Blymhill	Approximately; SJ 818 156			1203	1291	
Bradley	Approximately; SJ 879 180			1337	1337	
Brewood	Kent's Mill approximately SJ 876 084		1775	1775	1778	
Brewood	Somerford Mill approximately SJ 899 089	Post	1817	1802	1880	
Broadhill	Beffcote Mill; SJ 803 195	Tower		Late 18th century	Windmill World	
Bromstead Heath	SJ 800 159					
Brocton	Oat Hill Mill approximately SJ 978 205		1686; 1747; 1749	1686	1749	
Burslem	Approximately; SJ 869 500	Tower		c. 1750	1832, gone by 1860	
Burslem	Approximately; SJ 867 498			1780s	Disused early 19th century, demolished 1960s	
Burton on Trent	Approximately; SK 241 234			1818	1844	

=== C ===
Location	Name of mill and grid reference	Type	Maps	First mention or built	Last mention or demise	Photograph
Cannock	SJ 990 102					
Church Eaton	Alstone Mill; SJ 845 186		1682; 1775; 1831	1641	1831	
Church Eaton	High Onn Mill; SJ 827 162				Gone by 1652	
Church Eaton	Shushions Manor Mill approximately SJ 843 144			1300	1301	
Codsall	Codsall Windmill; SJ 867 041	Tower		1775	Windmill World	
Colton	Approximately; SK 041 207					
Coppenhall	Coppenhall Mill; SJ 897 191			1607	1617	
Coppenhall Mill	Butterhill Mill; SJ 897 191	Tower		c. 1800	Windmill World	
Coseley	Old Mill, Bramford; SO 938 932	Tower		c. 1780	Windmill World	
Coseley	Maullin's Mill, Roseville; SO 935 935	Post		1812	1813	
Coseley	Coseley Mill, Roseville; SO 936 936	Post	1820	1820	1868	
Coseley	New Mill	Tower				
Coven Heath	SJ 910 048		1775	1775	1775, gone by 1790	
Cowley	Approximately; SJ 830 198		1686; 1747	1587	1747	
Croxton	Croxton Mill; SJ 782 318	Tower		1777	Windmill World	

=== D - F ===
Location	Name of mill and grid reference	Type	Maps	First mention or built	Last mention or demise	Photograph
Darlaston	Darlaston Mill	Post	1795	1795	1795	
Darlaston	Approximately; SO 974 969	Tower	1834	1818	1886, gone by 1902	
Dilhorne	Approximately; SJ 974 436		1775	1775	1872, gone by 1900	
Dudley	Shaver's End Mill; SO 933 908	Post	1682	1682	1682	
Dudley	Shaver's End Mill; SO 933 908	Tower	1800; 1816	1787	Demolished 1930s	
Dudley	Eve Hill Mill; SO 935 901	Post	1682; 1747; 1749; 1775	1682	1775	
Dudley	Eve Hill Mill; SO 935 901	Tower		1808	1822, gone by 1886	
Dudley	London Fields Mill; SO 929 905		1682; 1747; 1749	1682	1749	
Dudley	Tipton Green Mill; SO 958 925		1682; 1747; 1749	1682	1749	
Dudley	Nertherton Mill; SO 935 874		1818	1818	1818	
Enville	Spital Brook Mills; SO 845 877	Tower		1801	Windmill World	
Enville	Grove Farm Mill approximately SO 805 879			Early 19th century	Early 19th century	
Enville	Highgate Common Mill approximately SO 837 884			Early 19th century	Early 19th century	
Essington	Essington Mill; SJ 943 036	Midlands post	1775	1681	1930; Windmill World	
Etruria	Etruria Pottery Works; SJ 868 474	Tower		1774	1794	
Forton	Forton Mill; SJ 758 216	Tower		1573	1780; Windmill World	

=== G - H ===
Location	Name of mill and grid reference	Type	Maps	First mention or built	Last mention or demise	Photograph
Garshall Green	Milwich Mill; SJ 969 340	Tower		1812	1829	
Gentleshaw	Gentleshaw Mill; SK 051 119	Tower		1820	Windmill World	
Gentleshaw	Coney's Mill; SK 050 160		1775	1775	1895	
Gerrards Bromley	Approximately; SJ 779 349				Gone by 1564	
Gerrards Bromley	Approximately; SJ 779 349		1818; 1831	1818	1831	
Gnosall	SJ 829 209		1831	1815	1831	
Hammerwich	SK 067 074			1300	1300	
Hammerwich	Speedwell Mill; SK 067 074	Tower		1779	Windmill World	
Hanbury				1567	1567	
Handsworth	SP 065 905	Tower			Gone by 1794	
Handsworth	SP 067 895	Tower		1759	Demolished c. 1870	
Hanley,	SJ 888 478	Tower		c. 1795	1857	
Hartshill	SJ 864 458	Tower		1780	Demolished 1842	
Haughton	SJ 874 192			1575	1638	
Hilderstone	SJ 949 345			1798	1855	
Himley			1682	1682	1682	
Himley	SO 874 913	Post		1831	1881	
Hixon	Approximately; SK 002 257	Post		1801	1841	

=== K - M ===
Location	Name of mill and grid reference	Type	Maps	First mention or built	Last mention or demise	Photograph
Kidsgrove	Kidsgrove Mill; Long Row Mill; SJ 840 541	Tower		1812	Windmill World	
Kingswinford	Kingswinford Mill; SO 874 895	Tower	1834	1818	1886	
Kingswinford	Tansey Green Mill; SO 863 884	Post	1775	1775	1840	
Kinver	Approximately; SO 856 842		1775	1775	1775	
Lapley	Approximately; SJ 874 128			1291	1358	
Lichfield	Windmill House; Grange Road Mill; SK 109 106	Tower		1809	Windmill World	
Little Saredon				1332	1332	
Little Saredon	Little Saredon Mill; Shareshill Mill; SJ 948 071	Tower		1816	Windmill World	
Longdon	Windmill Farm Mill; SK 066 148	Tower		1806	Windmill World	
Meir Heath	Meir Heath Mill; SJ 930 401	Tower	1775	1775	Windmill World	
Moneymore	Weeford Mill; SK 135 020	Tower		1818	Demolished 2015 for installation of a quarry Windmill World	

=== N - Q ===
Location	Name of mill and grid reference	Type	Maps	First mention or built	Last mention or demise	Photograph
Newborough	SK 125 252		1820; 1831	1820	1831	
Newcastle-under-Lyme	Approximately; SJ 852 468			1696	1696	
Newcastle-under-Lyme	Sneyd's Mill; SJ 820 479		1682	1682	Moved to Whitmore 1684	
Newcastle-under-Lyme	SJ 844 456		1819; 1820^{*}	1819	1820	
Norbury	Approximately; SJ 801 222		1686; 1747	1686	1747	
Norton-in-the-Moors	(two mills); SJ 895 518			1547	1547	
Pattingham	Nurton Hill Mill; SO 835 998	Tower		1811	Windmill World	
Pattingham	Approximately; SJ 829 005		1682	1682	1682	
Penkhull	SJ 870 450	Tower		1818	Demolished 1891	
Penkridge	Approximately; SJ 918 139		1772; 1820	1775	1820	
Perry Bar	Holdford Mill; SP 073 917		1814; 1831	1814	1831	
Quinton	Ridgacre Mill; SP 002 847	Post		1887	1900	

=== R - T ===
Location	Name of mill and grid reference	Type	Maps	First mention or built	Last mention or demise	Photograph
Rowley Regis	Rowley Mill; SO 969 876	Post	1775	1775	1865	
Rowley Regis	Hailstone Mill; Hawes Hill Mill; SO 966 881	Post	1682; 1775	1682	1826	
Rowley Regis	Approximately; SO 948 878		1819	1819	1819	
Rugeley	Approximately; SK 039 180			1600	1600	
Rushall	Rushall Mill approximately SK 028 011	Post	1775; 1788	1693	Demolished early 19th century	
Rushall	Goscote Field Mill		1775; 1788; 1799	1744	1799, gone by 1816	
Sandon	SJ 945 306		1682; 1747	1682	1747	
Sedgley	Ruiton Old Mill		1682	1682	1682	
	Rewardine Field Mill; Ruiton Old Mill; SO 919 921	Tower		1702	Collapsed 31 January 1872	
Sedgley	Roundhouse Mill; SO 920 921	Tower		c. 1830	Collapsed 1961	
Sedgley	Sandyfields Mill; SO 912 933	Tower		1817	1822	
Sedgley	Ruiton New Mill; SO 919 924	Tower		c. 1830	Ruiton Windmill	
Shelfield	High Heath Mill; SP 034 027	Post	1682	1682	1682	
Shelfield	Shelfield Mill; SP 027 876	Post	1831	1831	1872	
Smethwick	Smethwick Mill; SP 029 882	Tower		1803	Demolished August 1949	
Smethwick	Cape Mill approximately SP 027 876	Tower		1836		
Stafford	Foregate Field			1585	1585	
Stafford	Broad Eye Mill; SJ 918 232	Tower		1796	Broad Eye Windmill	
Stone	SJ 905 335	Tower		1803	Demolished 1847	
Tatenhill	SK 192 224	Post		1834	1861	
Tettenhall Wood	Tettenhall Mill; SO 873 991	Tower	1818	1818		
Trentham	Approximately; SJ 850 397	Tower		1802	Demolished; 1819	
Tunstall	SJ 857 515	Tower		1813	Demolished 1855	

=== U - Y ===
Location	Name of mill and grid reference	Type	Maps	First mention or built	Last mention or demise	Photograph
Uttoxeter	SK 085 340	Tower		1809	Demolished 1919	
Walsall	Morteyn's Mill approximately SP 013 977	Post		1304	Blown down 1393	
Walsall	Persehouse's Mill approximately SP 015 978	Post		1619	1732, gone by 1735	
Walsall	Blackham's Mill approximately SP 016 975	Post	1732; 1735	c. 1672	1735	
Walsall	Blackham's Mill approximately SP 016 975	Tower		1829	demolished 1885	
Walsall	Highgate Mill; SP 017 975	Post				
Walsall	Spring Hill Mill; SP 023 977	Post	1799; 1816	1799	1816	
Wednesbury	Church Hill Mill approximately SO 992 954	Post	1686	1686	1868, gone by 1889	
Wednesbury	Church Hill Mill (2nd mill) approximately SO 990 954	Post		1686	1686	
Wednesbury	Church Hill Mill approximately SO 990 954	Tower		1803	1868, gone by 1889	
Wednesbury	King's Hill Mill; SO 981 965	Post	1686	1686	1886	
Wednesfield Heath	Approximately; SO 990 954SO 932 999			1824	1849	
Wednesfield Heath	Mill Hill Mill; SO 943 993				Demolished c. 1750	
Werrington	Werrington Mill; SJ 942 475	Tower		1730	Windmill World	
West Bromwich	Hall Green Mill approximately SP 003 941	Post		1616	1822	
West Bromwich	Rider's Mill approximately SO 997 940	Post		1694	1767, gone by 1775	
West Bromwich	Mill Street Mill; Tantany Mill approximately SP 002 918	Post		1834	1842	
West Bromwich	Windmill Field; Lyndon Mill approximately SP 008 925	Post		1808	1830s	
West Bromwich	Crabb's Mill approximately SO 994 935	Post				
Weston under Lizard	SJ 807 107		1682; 1749	1682	1749	
Wheaton Aston	SJ 851 125	Midlands post		1854	Burnt down c. 1912	
Wigginton	SK 198 059		1818	1818	1828	
Wightwick	Wightwick mill SO 871 981	Tower		1720	Windmill World; Severely damaged by a gas explosion on 13 October 2018.	
Wightwick	(2nd mill)	Tower				
Wilbrighton	SJ 792 186			1787	1787	
Willenhall	Nechells Mill	Post	1682	1682	1682	
Willenhall	SO 968 982	Post	1818; 1831; 1834	1818	1880	
Willenhall	Rose Hill Mill	Post		1850	1850	
Willenhall	Stowheath Mill; Tudor Mill	Post	1682	1625	1756	
Willenhall	Clemson's Mill	Tower		Mid-18th century	Demolished early 19th century	
Wolverhampton	Stafford Street; SO 916 996	Tower		1775	1775	Demolished 1893
Wolverhampton	Stafford Street (2nd mill); SO 916 996	post		1775	1775	
Wolverhampton	Quebb Mill approximately SO 916 996		1686; 1832	1587	1832	
Wolverhampton	Penn Mill; SO 902 969	Post		1813	1837	
Wolverhampton	Wolverhampton Mill; SO 916 984		1686	1686	1686	
Wolverhampton	Goldthorn Hill; SO 909 969		1818	1818	c. 1905	
Wombourne	SO 877 933		1818; 1834	1818	1834	
Woodseaves	SJ 796 250			1821	Early 20th century	
Wrottesley	Pendeford Mill; SJ 887 034			1819	Gone by 1883	
Yarnfield	Tarnfield Mill; SJ 862 325			c. 1800	1861	
Yarnfield	Heanie's Mill; SJ 860 315			1824	1827	
Yoxall				1570	1570	
Yoxhall	SK 141 190			1818	1892	

== Maps ==
- 1682 Joseph Brown
- 1686 Robert Plot
- 1747 Jeffrey
- 1749 Bowen
- 1775 Yates
- 1799 Yates
- 1814 Ordnance Survey
- 1817 Ordnance Survey
- 1818 C & G Greenwood
- 1820 C & G Greenwood
- 1820^{*} Sherwood
- 1831 Yates
- 1834 Ordnance Survey

== Notes ==
Mills in bold are still standing, known building dates are indicated in bold. Text in italics denotes indicates that the information is not confirmed, but is likely to be the case stated.

== Sources ==
Unless otherwise indicated, the source for all entries is:-Job, Barry (1985). Staffordshire windmills. Birmingham: Midland Wind and Watermills Group.

^1 McKenna, Joseph (1986). Windmills of Birmingham and the Black Country. Studley: K A F Brewin Books. ISBN 0-947731-10-5.
