= Outwoods =

Outwoods may refer to the following places in England:

- Outwoods, East Staffordshire, Staffordshire
- Outwoods, Leicestershire
- Outwoods, Stafford, Staffordshire
- Outwoods, Warwickshire

== See also ==
- Outwood (disambiguation)
