= Ouston =

Ouston can refer to three places in England:

- Ouston, County Durham
- Ouston, Ninebanks, Northumberland
- Ouston, Stamfordham, Northumberland

Other locations:

- RAF Ouston, near Ouston, Stamfordham, Northumberland
