= Oxley =

Oxley may refer to:

== Places ==
=== Australia ===
==== Australian Capital Territory ====
- Oxley, Australian Capital Territory is a suburb of Canberra, Australia

==== Queensland ====
- Oxley, Queensland is a suburb of Brisbane, Australia
  - Oxley railway station, Brisbane serves the suburb of Oxley
- Electoral district of Oxley (Queensland) was a Queensland Legislative Assembly seat southwest of Brisbane
- Division of Oxley is an electoral division for the Australian House of Representatives
- Oxley Creek, a creek in Brisbane

==== New South Wales ====
- Oxley, New South Wales is a village on the lower Lachlan River, Australia
- Electoral district of Oxley (New South Wales) is a northern New South Wales Legislative Assembly electoral district
- Oxley Highway crosses northern New South Wales, Australia
- Oxley River, a tributary of the Tweed River, New South Wales

==== Victoria ====
- Oxley, Victoria is a town in North East Victoria, Australia

=== Canada ===
- Oxley, Ontario community in Essex, Ontario

=== New Zealand ===
- Port Oxley was the original name for Otago Harbour in Dunedin, New Zealand

=== United Kingdom ===
- Oxley, Wolverhampton is a suburb of Wolverhampton, England
- Oxley Green hamlet in Essex, England
- Oxley Woods is a housing development in Milton Keynes, Buckinghamshire
- Oxleys Wood is a nature reserve in Hertfordshire
- Oxley is a former name of the Abbey river in Surrey

== Other uses ==
- Oxley (surname)
- Oxley High School, a school located in Tamworth, NSW, Australia
- Oxley College (disambiguation), for disambiguation of the colleges
- Sarbanes–Oxley Act, a 2002 act of U.S. Congress
- 38 Oxley Road
