= Brightling =

Village in East Sussex, England

Coordinates: 50.963°N 0.398°E

- Location within East Sussex
- Area: 19.8 km^{2} (7.6 sq mi)
- Population: 371
  - Density: 48/sq mi (19/km^{2})
- OS grid reference: TQ684210
  - London: 43 miles (69 km) NNW
- District: Rother
- Shire county: East Sussex
- Region: South East
- Country: England
- Sovereign state: United Kingdom
- Post town: ROBERTSBRIDGE
- Postcode district: TN32
- Dialling code: 01424
- Police: Sussex
- Fire: East Sussex
- Ambulance: South East Coast
- UK Parliament: Bexhill and Battle

Brightling is a village and civil parish in the Rother district of East Sussex, England. It is located on the Weald eight miles (13 km) north-west of Battle and four miles (6.4 km) west of Robertsbridge.

The village lies in the High Weald Area of Outstanding Natural Beauty and due to its vantage point commands views in all directions.

The village pub used to be The Green Man on the corner opposite the church, dedicated to St. Thomas Becket, but it is said that as part of the arrangements to build 'The Pyramid' Jack Fuller caused the pub to be relocated about three miles (4.8 km) towards Robertsbridge at Oxley's Green.

The parish includes outlying hamlets Cackle Street, Hollingrove, Oxley's Green and Twelve Oaks. Brightling, Hollingrove and Cackle Street all had their own shop with a post office in Brightling itself. These have all closed with the passing of time.

Also in the parish is Brightling Down (197 m), the local vantage point topped by 'The Needle' and used as a beacon point hence Brightling Beacon.

The most obvious 'industry' in the area is agriculture yet well hidden is the Gypsum mine with infrastructure connected to the Mountfield plaster board processing plant.

There is an annual horse trials run at Brightling Park (formerly Rose Hill).

== Governance ==
The lowest level of government is the Brightling parish council. The parish council is responsible for local amenities such as the provision of litter bins, bus shelters and allotments. They also provide a voice into the district council meetings. The parish council comprises seven councillors with elections being held every four years. The May 2007 election was uncontested.

Rother District council provides the next level of government with services such as refuse collection, planning consent, leisure amenities and council tax collection. Brightling lies within the Darwell ward, which provides two councillors. The May 2007 election returned one Conservative and one independent councillor.

East Sussex county council is the third tier of government, providing education, libraries and highway maintenance. Brightling falls within the Rother North West ward. Anthony (John) Barnes, Conservative, was elected in the May 2005 election with 56.3% of the vote.

The UK Parliament constituency for Brightling is Bexhill and Battle.

Prior to Brexit in 2020, the village was part of the South East England constituency in the European Parliament.

== Landmarks ==
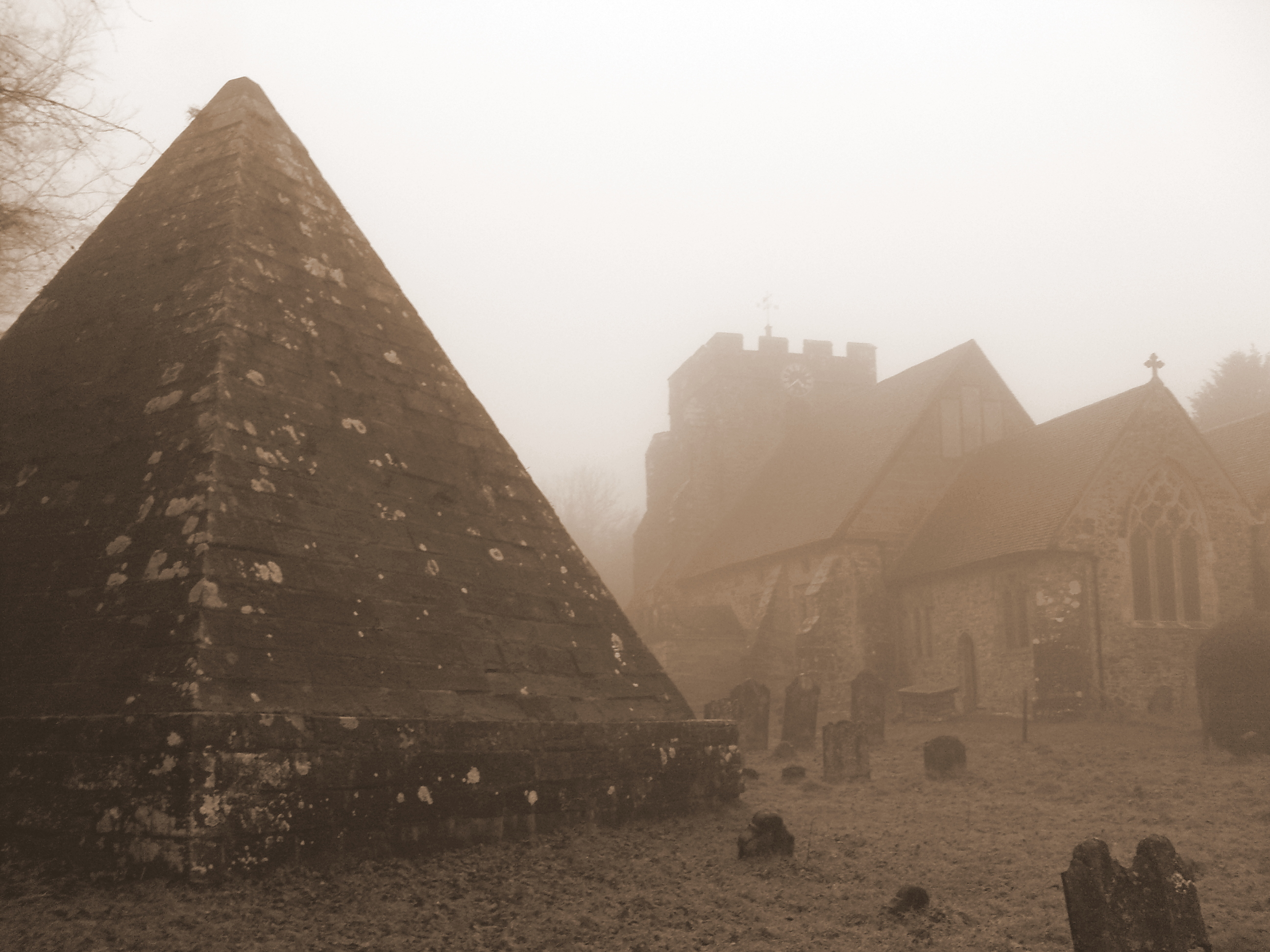
Mausoleum of John Fuller in Brightling churchyard

Willingford Meadows is a Site of Special Scientific Interest within the parish. These meadows are of biological importance due to the limestone outcrops providing calcareous soil conditions supporting a range of lime-loving flora.

== Notable people ==
- Barbara Bodichon is buried there, as is her brother, Arctic explorer, Benjamin Leigh Smith.
- John 'Mad Jack' Fuller (1757–1834), MP for Sussex and eccentric was an inhabitant of the parish. He was a prolific folly builder; his mausoleum, 'The Pyramid', stands in the churchyard next door to his house of Rose Hill. The local church contains a monument and a bust of Fuller.
- The grounds of Rose Hill were laid out by the landscape architect Capability Brown (1716–1783). In the area are also 'The Observatory', 'The Needle', 'The Sugarloaf', 'The Temple' and 'The Tower'. There is also 'The Wall' which was built around Brightling Park, Jack's estate. It has been said that this was built as a means of employing soldiers returning from the Napoleonic wars.
- Sir George Shurley, Lord Chief Justice of Ireland (died 1647) spent his last years in Brightling.
- Florence Yeldham (1877–1945), school teacher and historian of arithmetic, born in Brightling.
- John Donald, jewellery designer and goldsmith.
