= Brineton =

Coordinates: 52.721°N 02.286°W

- Hamlet
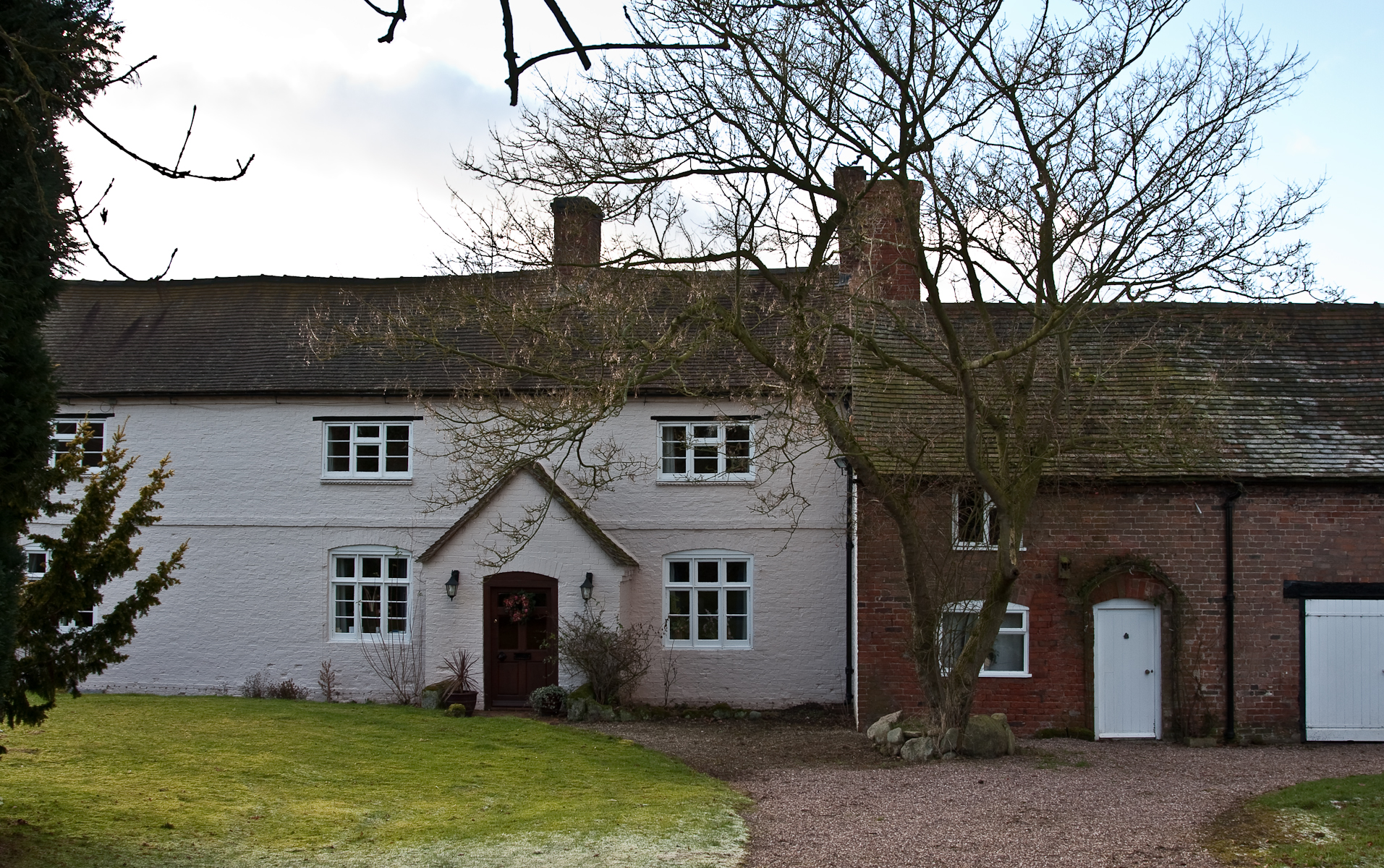
- Laurel Farm (1678)

- Location within Staffordshire
- OS grid reference: SJ8013
- District: South Staffordshire
- Shire county: Staffordshire
- Region: West Midlands
- Country: England
- Sovereign state: United Kingdom
- Post town: SHIFNAL
- Postcode district: TF11
- Police: Staffordshire
- Fire: Staffordshire
- Ambulance: West Midlands

Brineton is a hamlet in the South Staffordshire district of Staffordshire, England. It is 1 mile north of the village of Blymhill, and is within the civil parish of Blymhill and Weston-under-Lizard. Its name is derived from the Anglo Saxon term for "Bryni's settlement". The hamlet contains the 17th-century Brineton House, and Laurel Farm, a brick house built in 1678.

== See also ==
- Listed buildings in Blymhill and Weston-under-Lizard
