= Moreton, Staffordshire =

Village in Staffordshire, England

Coordinates: 52.75113°N 2.30367°W

Moreton
- Location within Staffordshire
- OS grid reference: SJ796171
- Civil parish: Gnosall
- District: Stafford
- Shire county: Staffordshire
- Region: West Midlands
- Country: England
- Sovereign state: United Kingdom
- Post town: NEWPORT
- Postcode district: TF10
- Dialling code: 01952
- Police: Staffordshire
- Fire: Staffordshire
- Ambulance: West Midlands
- UK Parliament: Stafford

Moreton is a small rural village in the borough of Stafford in Staffordshire, England, near the border with Shropshire. It includes the hamlets of Bromstead Heath, Great Chatwell, Coley, Outwoods and Wilbrighton.

It is 3.5 miles (5.6 km) south-west from Gnosall, 4 miles (6.4 km) south-east from Newport, and 11.8 miles (19.0 km) South-West-West from Stafford. Population details as taken at the 2011 Census can be found under Gnosall.

== Description ==
Two notable sites in the village are the village community hall built in 2000 and St. Mary's Church. The church of St. Mary is a stone building, in the Italian style, and was erected in 1837; it consists of a chancel, transepts and nave, with tower and one bell, and seats 340 people. One other local site which is now a privately owned home is the school, which at one point had over one hundred students from Moreton and its surrounding hamlets.

Considering the size of the village (roughly 50-60 houses), the lack of more facilities is unsurprising, although historically it had a school, shop, and two pubs as well as the remaining church and community centre located within the village.

The village is made up primarily of three roads: Heath Lane, Post Office Lane and Church Lane. Both the village hall and church are located on Church Lane, nearer to where the Lane joins Post Office Lane.

== History ==
Moreton ecclesiastical parish was formed on April 26, 1845, from the parish of Gnosall, although it remained in Gnosall parish for civil purposes.

Until the mid-1870s, it was referred to as a hamlet of Gnosall, and can be found, prior to 1880, described with the history of Gnosall. However, by 1880 it had developed sufficiently to be referred to separately, with its own 'satellite' hamlets: Bromstead Heath, Great Chatwell, Coley, Outwoods and Wilbrighton.

Folklorist Charlotte Burne (1850-1923) was born at Moreton Vicarage.
