= Brockhurst =

Brockhurst may refer to:

== Places ==
- Brockhurst, Staffordshire, a village in Staffordshire, England
- Brockhurst Castle, a castle in Little Stretton, Shropshire, England
- Brockhurst School, an independent boarding school for boys in Marlston, Berkshire, England
- Fort Brockhurst, a scheduled ancient monument in Gosport, Hampshire, England
- Lee Brockhurst, a village in Shropshire, England

== People ==
- Andrew Brockhurst (born 1964), Australian rules football player
- Gerald Brockhurst (1890–1978), English painter and etcher

== Fictional ==
- Lord and Lady Brockhurst, characters in The Boy Friend (musical) by Sandy Wilson (1954)

== See also ==
- Brockenhurst, a village in Hampshire, England
