= Elder Well =

Coordinates: 52.7019°N 2.2844°W

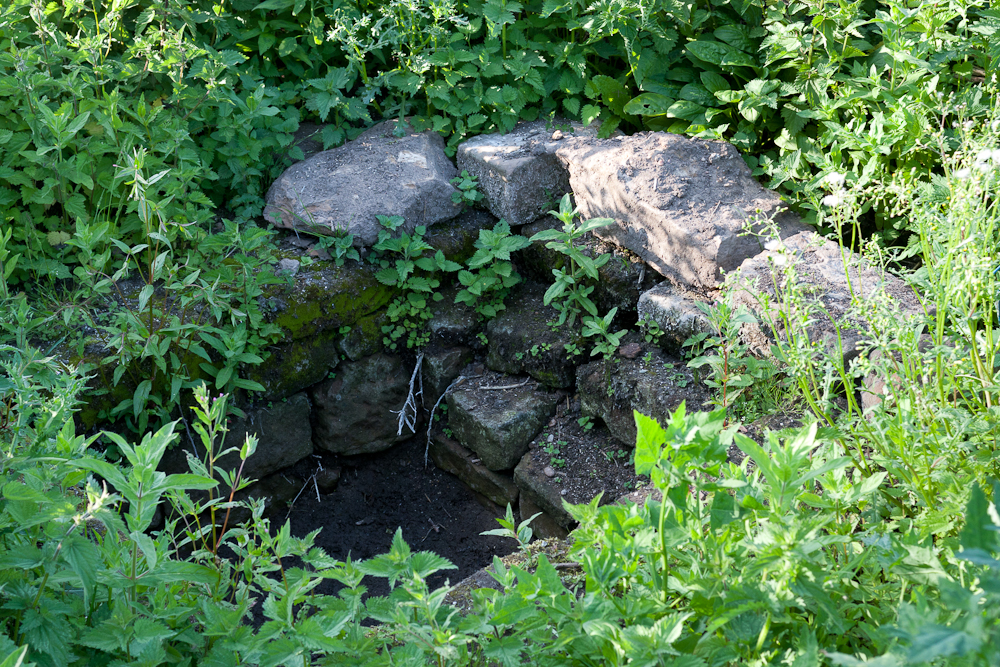
The well in summer.

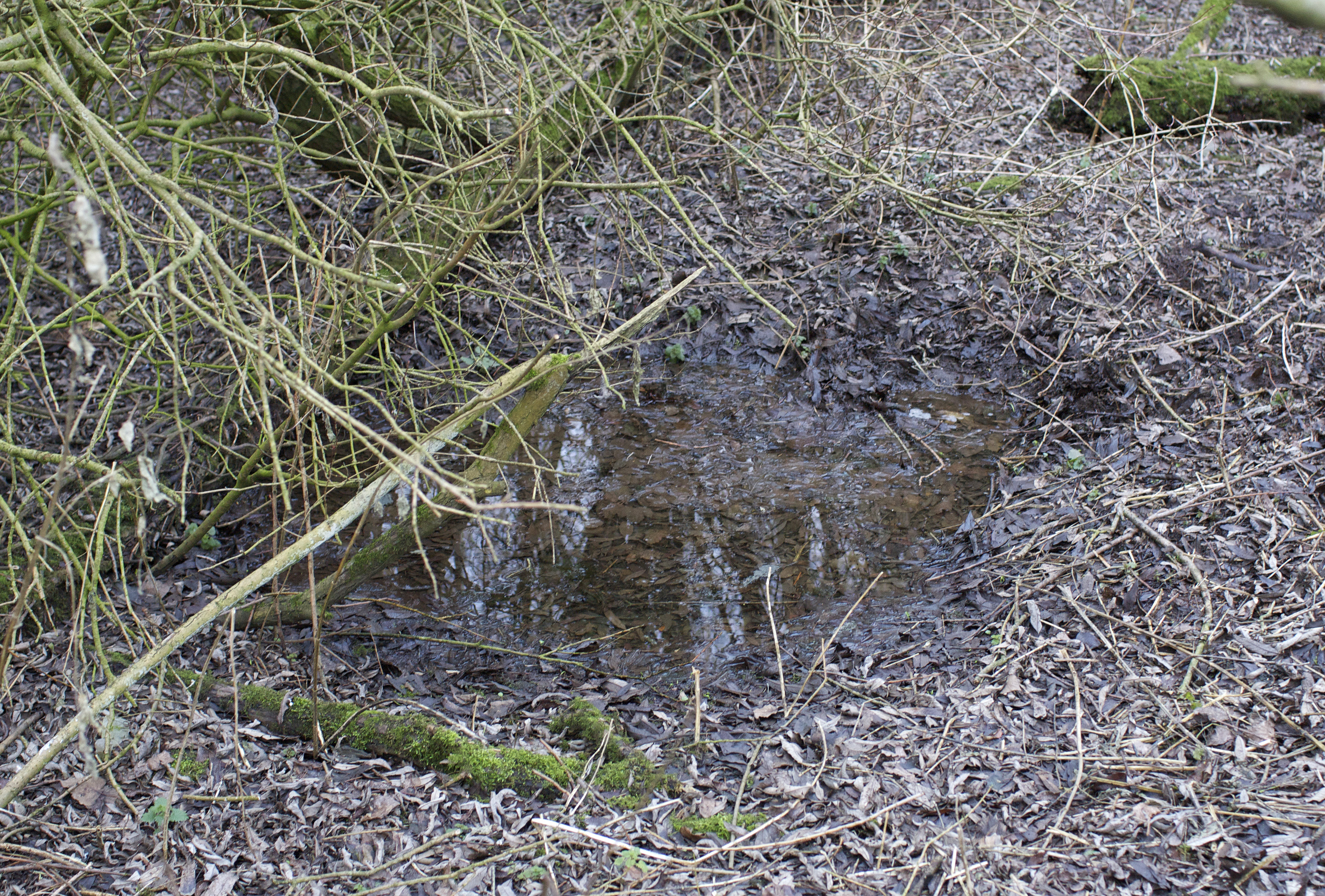
The well in winter, when flooded.

The Elder Well is a holy well located at Blymhill Marsh, close to the village of Blymhill, Staffordshire. It can be found among Elder trees on the north side of the Holy Well plantation. The well is a spring that emerges into a sandstone structure set into the ground. The structure is approximately 1 m square and 70 cm in depth.

The well was said to be blessed with medicinal properties and in particular to be a remedy for afflictions of the eyes. Hope states that it was "annually dressed with flowers and branches of trees, and rustic games and amusements [were] indulged in by those attending."

The well is mentioned frequently in old gazetteers. The earliest known reference is in the great Natural History of Staffordshire by Robert Plot. He writes as follows:

And amongst these [curative waters] must be reckon'd all sorts of Eye-waters, such as that of Elder well betwixt Blymhill and Brineton, and many others of the kind all over the Country.
