= Stamfordham =

Village in Northumberland, England

Coordinates: 55.042°N 1.877°W

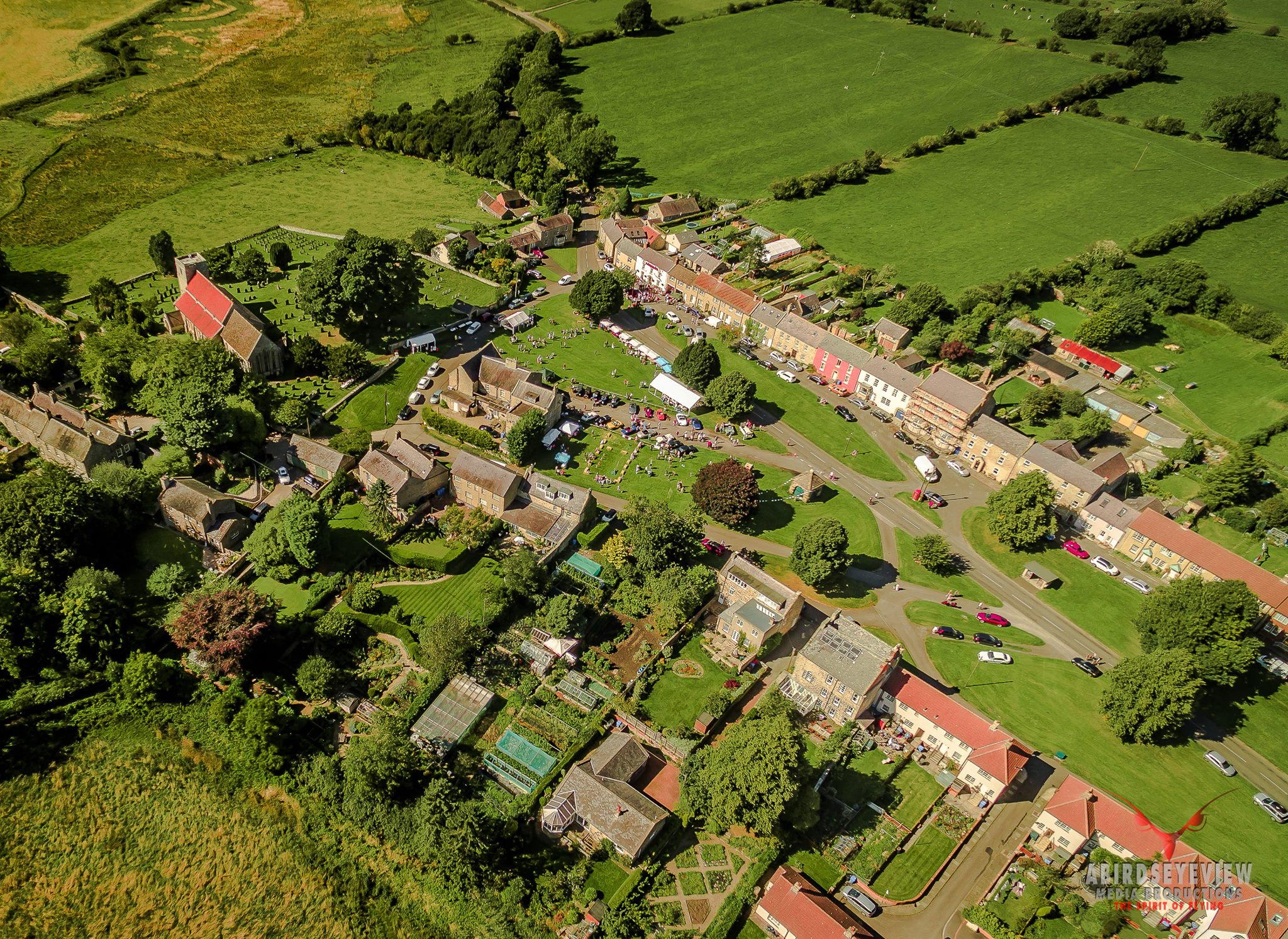
- Aerial view of Stamfordham in 2016

- Location within Northumberland
- Population: 1,047 (2001 Census)
- OS grid reference: NZ0772
- Civil parish: Stamfordham
- Unitary authority: Northumberland
- Ceremonial county: Northumberland
- Region: North East
- Country: England
- Sovereign state: United Kingdom
- Post town: Newcastle upon Tyne
- Postcode district: NE18
- Dialling code: 01661
- Police: Northumbria
- Fire: Northumberland
- Ambulance: North East
- UK Parliament: Hexham
- Website: Parish Council

Stamfordham is a village and civil parish in Northumberland, England. The population of the civil parish at the 2001 Census was 1,047, rising to 1,185 at the 2011 Census. The place-name Stamfordham is first attested in the Pipe Rolls for 1188, where it appears as Stanfordhamn, which roughly translates as 'village at the stony ford'.

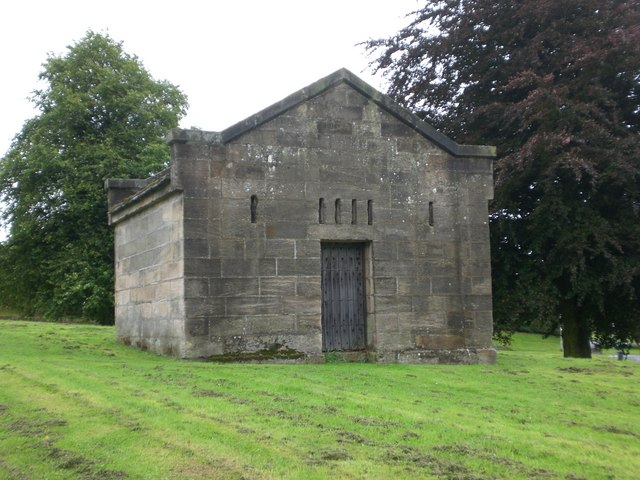
Old Jail

The Church of England parish church of St Mary the Virgin was built in the 13th century and overrestored under the direction of Benjamin Ferrey in 1848. In addition to St Mary's, there is a joint Methodist/United Reformed Church, the Church on the Green. The large village green contains a market cross (the Butter Cross, dating from 1735) and a village lock-up which is Grade II listed and dates from the early 19th century, pre-dating the formation of police forces.

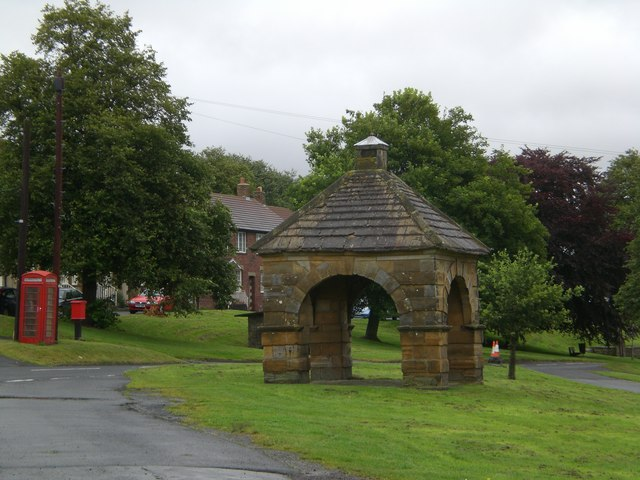
Stamfordham Butter Cross (1785)

The village has a ln Ofsted ‘excellent’ rated primary school, a historic Village Hall (originally the school), and a traditional public house (The Swinburne Arms). There is an annual fête (Stamfordham Village Fayre) in May, a tractor show in June, motorcycle show in early August, a car show on the August bank holiday Monday (Stamfordham Classic and Sports Car show), a charity Leek Show at the pub in September, and a number of local social and sports clubs and societies, notably Stamfordham Cricket Club (playing at Grange Park on the southern edge of the village), the first team of which competes in the West Tyne League. The Grade II-listed Bay Horse Inn closed in November 2014. The village is also host to a number of cycling events, including the Cyclone Festival of Cycling and the HSBC UK National Road Race Championships.

== Governance ==
Stamfordham was a parish until 1866. On 1 April 1955 the parish was reformed from Cheeseburn Grange, Dalton, Eachwick, Harlow Hill, Hawkwell, Heugh, Nesbitt, and Ouston.

== Notable people ==
- Sir Thomas Widdrington, judge and politician, and founder of the school in Stamfordham in 1663.
- William Dixon, the compiler of the oldest collection of bagpipe music in the British Isles, lived in nearby Ingoe; many of the family are buried in Stamfordham.
- Arthur Bigge, 1st Baron Stamfordham, Royal Artillery officer and Private Secretary to Queen Victoria and King George V.
- Henry Twizel, first class cricketer who played for Stamfordham Cricket Club.

== Sources ==
- Pevsner, Nikolaus; Richmond, Ian A (1957). Northumberland. The Buildings of England. Harmondsworth: Penguin Books. pp. 292–294.
