= Listed buildings in Blymhill and Weston-under-Lizard =

Blymhill and Weston-under-Lizard is a civil parish in the district of South Staffordshire, Staffordshire, England. It contains 61 listed buildings that are recorded in the National Heritage List for England. Of these, five are listed at Grade I, the highest of the three grades, and the others are at Grade II, the lowest grade. The parish contains the villages of Blymhill, Weston-under-Lizard, Brineton, Great Chatwell, and Orslow, and the surrounding countryside. Much of the parish is occupied by the country house Weston Hall and its estate, Weston Park. The house and many structures within the estate are listed. Most of the other listed buildings are houses, cottages, farmhouses and farm buildings, the earlier of which are timber framed or have timber famed cores. The other listed buildings include churches, memorials in the churchyards, and a public house

== Key ==
Grade	Criteria
I	Buildings of exceptional interest, sometimes considered to be internationally important
II	Buildings of national importance and special interest

== Buildings ==
Name and location	Photograph	Date	Notes	Grade
St Andrew's Church, Weston Park; 52.69318°N 2.28834°W		14th century	The oldest surviving part of the church is the east wall, the rest being rebuilt to a design by Lady Elizabeth Wilbraham in 1700–01. The church was restored in 1869–70 by G. E. Street, and a family chapel and vestry were added in 1876–77 by Ewan Christian. The church is built in red sandstone with dressings in white sandstone, and it has a brown tile roof. The church is built in red sandstone with dressings in white sandstone, and it has a brown tile roof, a chancel with a south chapel and a north vestry, and a west tower. The tower has five stages, diagonal buttresses, a west doorway with a round head, a moulded surround, and a keystone, a string course, and an embattled parapet with crocketed pinnacles. The windows on the sides of the church are round-headed with keystones, and the bays are divided by pilasters. The east window has three pointed lights, with a shaped gable above it.	I
St Mary's Church, Blymhill; 52.70746°N 2.28480°W		14th century	The oldest part of the church is the chancel. the tower dates from the 15th century, most of the rest of the church was rebuilt by G. E. Street in Early English style in 1856–59, and dormer windows were added in 1876. The church is built in red sandstone with dressings in white sandstone, and it has a brown tile roof. It consists of a nave, north and south aisles, a north porch, a chancel with a south vestry, and a west tower. The tower has four stages, angle buttresses, string courses, gargoyles, and an embattled parapet with small corner crocketed pinnacles. There is a large lion gargoyle between the south aisle and the vestry.	I
The Old Barn, Great Chatwell; 52.72728°N 2.30621°W	—	Late 16th century	The barn was partly refaced in the 17th century, and in the 20th century it was extended and converted into a house. It is timber framed with cruck construction on a brick plinth, and has a red tile roof. There is one storey and three bays, and the windows are casements. There is an exposed cruck truss to the southeast, and two more internally.	II
2 Beigherton Cottages; 52.70169°N 2.28895°W	—	17th century	The cottage, which has a timber framed core, was refaced in the 19th century. It is in red brick with a red tile roof, and there is exposed timber framing at the rear. There is one storey and an attic, and two bays. On the front are two gabled dormers, and at the rear there are two dormers, one of which is flat-topped.	II
2 Rectory Cottages, Blymhill; 52.70830°N 2.28327°W	—	17th century	The cottage, which was later refaced, has a timber framed core, with infill and refacing in brick, and a brown tile roof. There is one storey and an attic, and three bays. The windows are casements, and there are three gabled dormers. The doorway is at the rear and has a segmental head.	II
Black and White Cottage and attached cottage, Blymhill; 52.70905°N 2.28465°W		17th century	The original cottage is timber framed and has infill and refacing in brick and a brown tile roof. There is one storey and an attic, and two bays. On the front is a blocked gabled porch, the windows are casements, and there is an eyebrow dormer. Attached to the right is a later cottage in brick, with two storeys, two bays, and a gabled porch.	II
Gatherwynde; 52.71177°N 2.29666°W	—	17th century	The house was refaced and extended in the 19th century. The original part is timber framed, the infill, refacing and extension are in painted brick, and the roof has brown tiles. There is one storey and an attic, an L-shaped plan, and a front of three bays. The windows are casements, and there are gabled dormers.	II
Weston Hall and service wings 52.69293°N 2.28797°W		1670s	A country house that was altered in the 19th century. It is in red brick with stone dressings, quoins and bands, and has a lead-covered roof behind parapets. There are three storeys and cellars, and a U-shaped plan, later filled by additions. The south front has eleven bays, the middle and outer two bays projecting, the latter bays under segmental broken pediments, between which is a balustraded parapet. The middle bay is in stone and contains a doorway, and the windows have surrounds of various designs. The east front has nine bays, the middle three bays projecting under a pediment, and containing a porte-cochère with Tuscan columns. Attached to the house are two service wings.	I
High Hall, Blymhill; 52.70413°N 2.27518°W	—	Late 17th century	A farmhouse in red brick on a chamfered stone plinth, it has stone quoins, a floor band, a coved eaves cornice and a brown tile roof. There are two storeys and four bays. The doorway has reeded pilasters, a fanlight and a hood on brackets, and the windows are mullioned and transomed casements.	II
Brineton Grange Farmhouse; 52.72186°N 2.28743°W	—	1678	The farmhouse is in painted brick, with a floor band, a dentilled eaves band, and a red tile roof with verge parapets. Three are two storeys and three bays. On the front is a gabled porch, and the windows are casements, those in the ground floor with segmental heads.	II
Stable block, Weston Hall; 52.69290°N 2.28650°W		1688	The stable block, which was later extended, is in red brick with stone dressings, a coved eaves cornice, and a hipped Westmorland slate roof. There are two storeys and a U-shaped plan around the stable yard. The front range has eleven bays, the middle three bays projecting under a pediment containing a sundial, flanked by quoins, and surmounted by a wrought iron finial. The central doorway has quoins, a cornice, and a pediment, and above it is a cartouche. In the two outer bays at each end are arches, and the windows are casements. The doors on the sides have massive lintels.	II
Brockton Grange Farmhouse; 52.71992°N 2.29653°W	—	Early 18th century	The farmhouse, which was altered in the 19th century, is in red brick on a plinth, with bands, pilaster strips, a moulded eaves cornice, and a cedar shingle roof. There are two storeys and an attic, and three bays. On the front is a timber porch, the doorway has a rectangular fanlight, and the windows are sashes, those in the ground floor are tripartite.	II
Chatwell Lodge, Great Chatwell; 52.72681°N 2.30648°W		Early 18th century	The house, at one time an inn, was altered in the 19th and 20th centuries. It is in red brick on a plinth, with a sill band, quoins, a moulded eaves cornice, and a brown tile roof. There are two storeys and three bays. The central doorway has a flat hood, to the right is a bay window, and to the left is a casement window with a moulded surround and a segmental head with a keystone. The upper floor contains two casement windows, between which is a blocked window.	II
The Curatage, Weston Park; 52.69392°N 2.29001°W	—	Early 18th century	The house has a sandstone ground floor with red brick above, floor bands, and a brown tile roof with verge parapets. There are two storeys and an attic, five bays, and a smaller wing on the left. In the centre is a trellis porch, and the windows are casements.	II
Grove Farmhouse and railings, Blymhill; 52.70814°N 2.28145°W	—	Mid 18th century	The farmhouse is in painted brick with floor bands, dentilled eaves, and a brown tile roof. There are two storeys, two parallel ranges, a front of three bays, and two single-storey bays on the garden front. The central doorway has pilasters, a fanlight, a triglyph frieze, and a flat hood on horizontally-reeded scrolled consoles. The windows are casement cross-windows with segmental heads. In front of the garden are cast iron railings on a stone plinth and a gate.	II
Stables and Granary, Weston Hall; 52.69372°N 2.28607°W		18th century (probable)	The building is in red brick on a plinth and with dressings in sandstone, a sill band, a dentilled eaves course, a moulded cornice, and a roof of Westmorland slate. There are three storeys and a U-shaped plan. On the corners are pavilions with blind lunettes and oculi, corbelled dove ledges, and pyramidal hipped roofs with weathervanes. On the front are two projecting gabled archways, and in the roof are three louvred granary dormers.	II
Gateway, Stable block, Weston Hall; 52.69294°N 2.28680°W	—	18th century	The gateway is to the southwest of the stable block. It has stone gate piers about 3 metres (9.8 ft) high, each with a moulded string course, and a pine cone finial. The gates are in cast and wrought iron, and have vertical bars, four with finials.	II
Urn at SJ 814104, Weston Park; 52.69089°N 2.27646°W	—	18th century	The urn is in stone, and has a pedestal and a moulded surbase. The urn has a stem, a fish-scaled bowl, a leaf frieze, and a garlanded festooned top with a finial.	II
Urn at SJ 814105, Weston Park; 52.69191°N 2.27657°W	—	18th century	The urn is in stone, and has a pedestal and a moulded surbase. The urn has a stem, an acanthus bowl with crossed palm fronds on the sides, egg and dart decoration on the rim, and a domed top.	II
Walled garden, lodges and gates, Weston Hall; 52.69479°N 2.28796°W	—	18th century	The walls surround a vegetable garden, they are in red brick with stone dressings, and the heated wall runs through the centre. There are wrought iron entrance gates on the south, and lodges in the west section, each with a single storey, a pedimented front, an oculus in the tympanum, and casement windows with keystones.	II
Stafford Gateway, Weston Park; 52.69425°N 2.26531°W		Mid 18th century	The entrance to the drive is flanked by square stone piers with moulded capping. Outside these are stone screen walls with a balustrade and similar end piers. The gates are in wrought iron.	II
Stafford Lodge, Weston Park; 52.69417°N 2.26542°W		Mid 18th century	The entrance lodge is in red sandstone, with a floor band and a hipped slate roof. There are two storeys and three bays, the middle bay projecting under a pediment. In the centre bay is a porch with Tuscan columns and a pediment, above it is a large blind arched recess, and in the outer bays are sash windows.	II
Shrewsbury Gates, piers and walls, Weston Park; 52.69528°N 2.30065°W	—	Mid 18th century	The entrance to the drive is flanked by square stone piers about 2 metres (6 ft 7 in) high, with a moulded string course and capping. Outside these are stone screen walls with a balustrade and similar end piers. The gates are in wrought iron.	II
Shrewsbury Lodge, Weston Park; 52.69534°N 2.30031°W		Mid 18th century	The entrance lodge is in red sandstone, with a floor band and a hipped slate roof. There are two storeys and three bays, the middle bay projecting under a pediment. In the centre bay is a porch with Tuscan columns and a pediment, above it is a large blind arched recess, and in the outer bays are sash windows.	II
Temple of Diana, Weston Park; 52.69133°N 2.28188°W		c. 1760	An orangery and garden house designed by James Paine, it is in stone with roofs of lead and slate. The orangery has three bays on a podium, with engaged Ionic columns, paired at the angles with niches between and blind panels above. The bays contain large round-headed windows, and above them is a patera frieze, a cornice, and a balustraded parapet. Behind is the garden house that has five bays and a cellar and contains sash windows. In the centre is a two-storey projecting octagon with a pediment, a cornice, and surmounted by a semi-spherical dome.	I
Bridge at SJ 813104, Weston Park; 52.69082°N 2.27777°W		1760s	An ornamental bridge crossing Temple Pool in Weston Park, it was designed by James Paine. It is in stone, and consists of a single arch rising from a rusticated plinth flanked by abutments containing niches and with open pediment finials. The carriageway is cambered, and has a balustraded parapet with a modillioned cornice edge, and is splayed down to blocks at the ends.	I
The Old Rectory, Blymhill; 52.70725°N 2.28398°W	—	1770s	The rectory, later a private house, was substantially rebuilt in about 1824 and altered in about 1908. It is in rendered brick on a plinth, with floor bands, widely projecting eaves, and a hipped slate roof. There are two storeys, and the entrance front has four bays. The doorway has pilasters, a fanlight and a flat hood on scrolled corbels, and the windows are sashes. The garden front has seven bays, the middle three bays forming a two-storey angled bay window.	II
Great Chatwell House Farmhouse and shed 52.72820°N 2.30796°W	—	Late 18th century	The farmhouse, which was extended in the 19th century, is in red brick with a brown tile roof. There are three storeys and four bays. The doorway has pilasters, a fanlight, and an open pediment. The windows in the lower two floor are sashes, and in the top floor they are casements. To the west is a single-storey shed with four elliptical arches on the yard side.	II
Obelisk, Weston Park; 52.68519°N 2.28103°W		Late 18th century	The obelisk in Weston Park is in sandstone. It has a square plan, it is on a plinth, and is about 10 metres (33 ft) high.	II
Pendrill's Cave, Weston Park; 52.69409°N 2.29105°W		Late 18th or early 19th century	The cave or grotto is in sandstone and has a vault enclosure about 2 metres (6 ft 7 in) high and 3 metres (9.8 ft) deep.	II
Fowler Memorial, Blymhill; 52.70728°N 2.28505°W	—	1801	The memorial is in the churchyard of St Mary's Church, and is to the memory of John Fowler. It is a pedestal tomb in stone, it has a moulded plinth, and is surmounted by an urn with a gadrooned base.	II
Yates Memorial, Blymhill; 52.70762°N 2.28463°W	—	1807	The memorial is in the churchyard of St Mary's Church, and is to the memory of Francis Yates. It is a pedestal tomb in stone, it has a moulded plinth, and is surmounted by a fluted and reeded urn.	II
Stockley Memorial, Blymhill; 52.70733°N 2.28467°W	—	1814	The memorial is in the churchyard of St Mary's Church, and is to the memory of Joshua Stockley. It is a pedestal tomb in stone, it has a moulded plinth, and is surmounted by a plain urn.	II
Beigherton House Farmhouse; 52.70035°N 2.28698°W	—	Early 19th century	The farmhouse is in red brick, stuccoed on the front, and has giant pilaster strips with moulded heads on the angles, and a blue tile roof. There are three storeys, two parallel ranges, and a front of three bays. In the centre is a large flat-roofed porch with a moulded frieze and a blocking course, and the windows are a mix of sashes and casements.	II
Bradford Arms, Ivetsey Bank; 52.69416°N 2.24712°W		Early 19th century	The public house, which has an earlier core, is in red brick with a rendered front, a floor band, a hipped tile roof at the front, and a parapet at the rear. There are two storeys, an L-shaped plan, and a front of six bays. In the centre is a pedimented doorway, and the windows are small-pane casements with Gothic-style glazing. The side door has an arched hood.	II
Brineton Farm; 52.72084°N 2.28407°W	—	Early 19th century	The farmhouse is in red brick with a band, and a red tile roof with verge parapets. There are two storeys, two bays, and a lower wing at the rear. The doorway and the windows, which are casements, have segmental heads.	II
Limekiln, Dawford Brook; 52.73100°N 2.30830°W	—	Early 19th century	The structure, probably a limekiln, is in red brick and has a flat roof covered in earth. It has a circular plan and two arched entrances.	II
Orslow Manor Farmhouse; 52.73527°N 2.28871°W	—	Early 19th century	A red brick farmhouse with a blue tile roof. There are two storeys and three bays. The central doorway has a fanlight and a cornice, and the windows are sashes, those in the ground floor are tripartite.	II
Pauslip's Tunnel and gate, Weston Park; 52.69281°N 2.28596°W	—	Early 19th century	The tunnel connects the two parts of the grounds. It consists of a stone vault about 10 metres (33 ft) long and 1.8 metres (5 ft 11 in) high. At the west end are wrought iron gates with wavy vertical bars.	II
Sundial, Weston Park; 52.69258°N 2.28442°W	—	Early 19th century	The sundial in the grounds of the hall is in Coade stone, and is 1 metre (3 ft 3 in) high. It has a triangular plan with concave sides. At the bottom is a plinth with meander decoration on a circular base, the sides are moulded with festoons at the top, in the angles are caryatids, and at the top is a fluted frieze and an egg and dart cornice.	II
Two urns and planting basin, Weston Park; 52.69121°N 2.28204°W	—	Early 19th century	The urns and planting basin are in Coade stone, and are to the southwest of the Temple of Diana. The basin has a diameter of 2 metres (6 ft 7 in), with a cabled rim to the kerb. The urns are on a base, and each has a short stem, and a wide body with guilloché decoration and carvings of lions' heads.	II
Brick Kiln Cottage, Great Chatwell; 52.73124°N 2.30638°W	—	Mid 19th century	The cottage and brick kiln are in red brick with red tile roof. The cottage has two storeys and two bays, and at the east end is the building containing the kiln, which is incorporated into the structure. The cottage has casement windows with segmental heads and a doorway with a stone head. The kiln has cast iron casement windows, and the east end is circular with cone-shaped openings.	II
Workshop adjacent to Brick Kiln Cottage, Great Chatwell; 52.73115°N 2.30617°W	—	Mid 19th century	The workshop is in red brick with a tile roof, and has one storey and four bays. The south gable end contains blind arcading with a circular window above. The furnace stack is near the southeast corner, at the west are open sheds, and at the east is an entry with a dormer above.	II
Screen and entrance wall, Chatwell Court drive 52.72689°N 2.30688°W		Mid 19th century	The wall and arched entrance are in stone. The entrance has a Tudor arch flanked by gabled pilaster buttresses. The wall has a U-shaped form, the front is about 3.5 metres (11 ft) high, the sides are lower, and it has a pitched moulded ridge.	II
Blymhill Gates, gatepiers and walls, Weston Park; 52.69518°N 2.28479°W	—	Mid 19th century	At the entrance to the drive are two pairs of stone gate piers, outside which are quadrant walls with balustrading and ending in piers. The gates are in wrought iron.	II
Boathouse at SJ 812105, Weston Park; 52.69094°N 2.27911°W		Mid 19th century	The boathouse is in sandstone and has a Westmorland slate roof with a projecting verge and rusticated timber bargeboards. The doorway is arched, with a projecting keystone.	II
Brewood Lodge, Weston Park; 52.68562°N 2.27112°W	—	Mid 19th century	The lodge is in sandstone with a band and a brown tile roof. There is one storey and an attic, two parallel ranges, a front of two gabled bays, and a later lean-to to the north. In the centre is a gabled porch with carved bargeboards, the windows are casements with arched heads, and there are two gabled half-dormers on the south front.	II
Garden features south and west of Weston Hall; 52.69268°N 2.28877°W	—	Mid 19th century	The features in the gardens to the west and south of the hall, which are laid out in terraces at four levels, are in stone, and include boundary and retaining walls, steps, a basin and a fountain, and wrought iron gates. The urns have gadrooned bases and egg and dart rims. The fountain has a quatrefoil shape and includes putti.	II
The Cottage, Weston Park; 52.69098°N 2.27624°W	—	Mid 19th century	A cottage orné, it is in red brick and stone, and has a tile roof, hipped at the front and gabled at the rear. There is a single storey, an L-shaped plan, and a three-bay front. On the front is a French casement window, a semicircular bay window with a central gablet, and a trellised verandah.	II
The Garden House, Weston Hall; 52.69438°N 2.28921°W	—	Mid 19th century	The cottage, with possibly an earlier timber framed core, is pebbledashed with a dentilled cornice, and a tile roof. There is one storey and an attic, and six bays. The doorway has a hood, the windows are casements, there are gabled dormers, and the gable end has shaped bargeboards and a finial.	II
The Pheasantry, Weston Park; 52.69460°N 2.29074°W	—	Mid 19th century	An estate cottage, it is timber framed on a stone plinth, and has a red tile roof. There is one storey and an attic, and three bays, the middle bay gabled. On the front are two doors, the windows are casements, those in the central bay with trefoil heads, in the attic are dormers, and at the left end are cusped bargeboards.	II
Weston Gates and piers, Weston Park; 52.69489°N 2.28935°W	—	Mid 19th century	There are four stone piers flanking the main drive and the pedestrian entrances. They have moulded string courses and copings. On the outer piers are ball finials, and on the inner piers are lions holding wreaths. The gates are in wrought iron.	II
Weston Lodge (East), Weston Park; 52.69495°N 2.28902°W	—	Mid 19th century	The lodge is in red sandstone, with a floor band and a brown tile roof. There is one storey and an attic, two parallel ranges, and a front of two bays. The gabled porch has carved bargeboards, the windows are casements with Gothic heads, and in the right return are gabled dormers.	II
Weston Lodge (West), Weston Park; 52.69500°N 2.28941°W	—	Mid 19th century	The lodge is in red sandstone, with a floor band and a brown tile roof. There is one storey and an attic, two parallel ranges, and a front of two bays. The gabled porch has carved bargeboards, the windows are casements with Gothic heads, and in the right return are gabled dormers.	II
School and school house, Blymhill; 52.70783°N 2.28499°W		1855–57	The school and school house were designed by G. E. Street in Gothic style, and are in stone with red tile roofs and decorated ridge tiles. The school has one storey, and two gables on the front containing four-light pointed windows. The house has two storeys and four bays, a two-storey porch, and the windows are casements.	II
Churchyard wall, gate piers and gates, St Mary's Church; 52.70774°N 2.28453°W	—	1856–59	The churchyard wall is in stone, and has steeply pitched coping and a moulded ridge. The gateway to the church has gabled stone pillars, and a wrought iron overthrow and lantern. The gateway to the school has rusticated pillars with pyramidal caps, and cast iron gates.	II
Orangery and passage, Weston Hall; 52.69317°N 2.28861°W	—	1865	The orangery is in sandstone with a glazed roof, it is on a rusticated podium, and has a balustraded parapet. There are seven bays, the middle three bays projecting and angled with quoins and ball finials. The glazing on the front is arched with keystones and hood moulds. A screen passage leads from the orangery to the church and the house. This has six bays, a niche and quoin bands. The openings have pilasters, and in the spandrels are blind circles.	II
Mortuary Chapel and vault, Weston Park; 52.69511°N 2.29084°W		1870	The mortuary chapel in Weston Park is in sandstone with a lead roof, and is in Beaux-Arts Grecian style. It is on a plinth, and steps lead up to a portico with two pairs of Tuscan columns, a plain frieze, and a pediment, behind which is a central doorway. There are three bays divided by pilasters, and at the end is a tripartite window. Behind the chapel is a cast iron vault surrounded by railings.	II
Blymhill Lodge, Weston Park; 52.69517°N 2.28535°W	—	Late 19th century	The estate lodge is in red brick with a tile roof. There are two storeys and a gabled front. In the ground floor is a seven-light casement window, on the left return is a timber framed porch, and the gables have carved fretted bargeboards and finials. On the sides are lean-to outbuildings.	II
Boathouse and Cottage at SJ 799102, Weston Park; 52.68843°N 2.29766°W	—	Late 19th century	The boathouse and cottage are adjacent to New Park Pool, and are in rusticated sandstone with slate roofs. The boathouse has a L-shaped plan with a gabled end towards the lake, containing an arched entrance with a quatrefoil in the apex. The cottage has casement windows and a hipped angled end.	II
Lych gate, Weston Cemetery; 52.69536°N 2.29067°W	—	Late 19th century	The lych gate at the entry to the cemetery has a timber frame on a stone plinth, and a red tile roof with triangular lucarnes. The front is gabled and has bargeboards with a trefoil pattern, and the gates have trefoil heads.	II
