= Florence Yeldham =

British mathematician (1877–1945)

- Born: Florence Annie Yeldham; 30 October 1877; Brightling, Battle, Sussex, England
- Died: 10 January 1945 (aged 67); Metropolitan Convalescent Home, Walton-on-Thames, Surrey, England
- Occupations: School teacher, historian of arithmetic
- Known for: Supporting the idea of following history of mathematics as a motive to teach arithmetic

Florence Annie Yeldham (30 October 1877 – 10 January 1945) was a British school teacher and historian of arithmetic. She supported the idea of following the history of mathematics as a motive to teach arithmetic.

== Early life and education ==
Florence Yeldham was born at School House, Brightling, Battle, East Sussex, on 30 October 1877, the daughter of school teacher Thomas Yeldham, who later became a school inspector, and his wife, Elizabeth Ann Chesterfield. She was the second daughter and second of at least seven children. She was not originally from London but moved there from Sussex and studied in James Allen's Girls' School, Dulwich.

James Allen's Girls' School awarded her an exhibition to go to Bedford College, University of London, from where she matriculated in 1895. Yeldham graduated with a BSc (division two) in 1900, having chosen papers in pure mathematics, experimental physics, and zoology. Whilst she is listed as having gained honours, which one would have expected, no details have been found.

== Career ==
Although she did not enjoy a remarkable teaching career, Yeldham wrote books herself. She produced her first printed work in 1913. Her works include The Story of Reckoning in the Middle Ages, The Teaching of Arithmetic Through 400 Years, 1535–1935, A Study of Mathematical Methods in England to the Thirteenth Century and Percentage Tables. Her books were well regarded and included reference material which was not easily available.

Yeldham fell victim to chronic arthritis, which made her final years uncomfortable. She died while staying at Metropolitan Convalescent Home, Walton-on-Thames, Surrey, where she spent the last six months of her life.
