= Brockhurst, Staffordshire =

Hamlet in Staffordshire, England

Coordinates: 52.704°N 2.261°W

Brockhurst
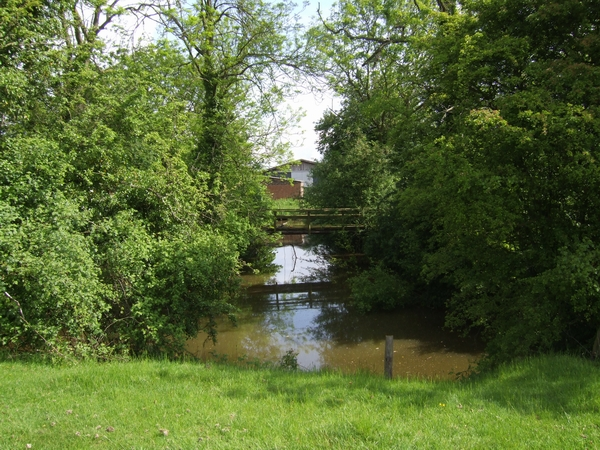
- The medieval moat at Brockhurst Farm

- Location within Staffordshire
- OS grid reference: SJ824118
- Civil parish: Blymhill and Weston-under-Lizard
- District: South Staffordshire
- Shire county: Staffordshire
- Region: West Midlands
- Country: England
- Sovereign state: United Kingdom
- Police: Staffordshire
- Fire: Staffordshire
- Ambulance: West Midlands
- UK Parliament: Stafford

Brockhurst is a hamlet in Staffordshire, England, 1 mile sorth-west of Blymhill. It is part of Blymhill and Weston-under-Lizard civil parish within South Staffordshire district.

Today the hamlet consists of Brockhurst farm, a red brick 18th farmhouse, and two blocks of semi-detached houses built in 1954. The buildings rest on the site of a much earlier settlement, as evidenced by medieval earthworks. These include a square moat to the south-eastern side of the farmhouse, with raised mound within, and the line of a second moat seventy-five yards to the south-west.

Raven speculates on the origin of the name 'Brockhurst':

'Broc' in a place name usually means either stream or badger. 'Hurst' can mean either a wood or a hill, or a wooded hill or even a sandbank in a river. As there are no streams, hills or sandbanks here it might be fair to interpret the name 'Brockhurst' as meaning 'the wood (or clearing in the wood) which has a badger sett'.
