= Outwood =

Outwood may refer to:

== Places in the United Kingdom ==
- Outwood, Greater Manchester, formerly a civil parish
- Outwood, Somerset, a UK location
- Outwood, Surrey
- Outwood, Wakefield
- Outwood, Worcestershire, a neighbourhood in Chaddesley Corbett

== See also ==
- Outwood Grange Academies Trust, including a list of schools
