= Eachwick =

Hamlet in Northumberland, England

Coordinates: 55.034374°N 1.8172136°W

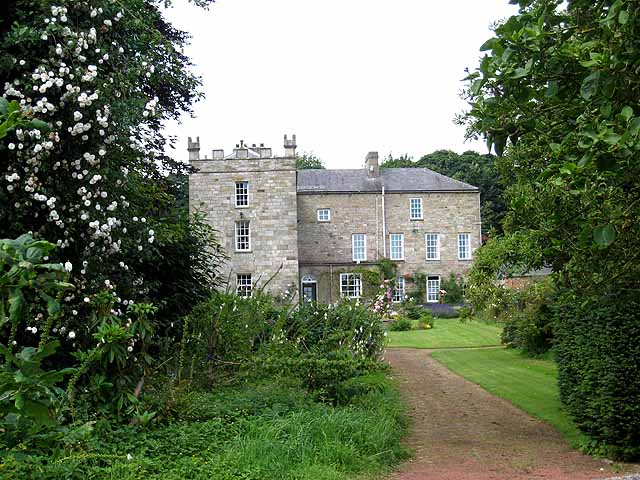
- Eachwick Hall

- Location within Northumberland
- Civil parish: Stamfordham
- Unitary authority: Northumberland
- Ceremonial county: Northumberland
- Region: North East
- Country: England
- Sovereign state: United Kingdom
- Police: Northumbria
- Fire: Northumberland
- Ambulance: North East

Eachwick is a hamlet in the civil parish of Stamfordham, in the county of Northumberland, England. It is 11 miles (18 km) from Morpeth.

== History ==
The name "Eachwick" is uncertain and may mean 'Oak-tree specialized-farm' or 'Aeca's specialized-farm'. Eachwick was formerly a township in Heddon-on-the-Wall parish, from 1866 Eachwick was a civil parish in its own right until it was abolished and merged to create Stamfordham on 1 April 1955. In 1951 the parish had a population of 69. There are earthworks of Eachwick medieval village, that existed in AD 1296.
