= Great Chatwell =

Village in Staffordshire, England

Coordinates: 52.72775°N 2.30647°W

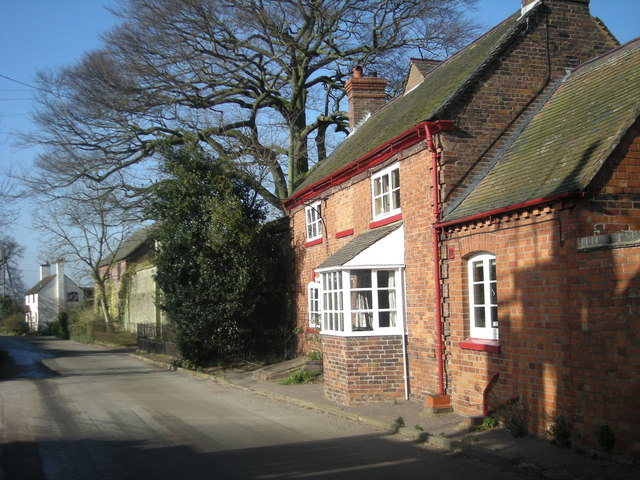
- Cottages in Great Chatwell

- Location within Staffordshire
- OS grid reference: SJ794145
- Civil parish: Blymhill and Weston-under-Lizard
- District: South Staffordshire
- Shire county: Staffordshire
- Region: West Midlands
- Country: England
- Sovereign state: United Kingdom
- Post town: NEWPORT
- Postcode district: TF10
- Dialling code: 01952
- Police: Staffordshire
- Fire: Staffordshire
- Ambulance: West Midlands
- UK Parliament: Stafford

Great Chatwell is a small village within the civil parish of Blymhill and Weston-under-Lizard, in the South Staffordshire district of Staffordshire, England. It lies on the border with Shropshire, around 1 mile (1.6 km) north-west of Blymhill.

The name presumably derives either from nearby St. Chad's well at Chadwell or from the Old English for 'Ceatta's well or stream'.

The village contains a number of notable buildings. A white cottage was formerly a telephone exchange, reputedly the last manual exchange in England. Opposite the Red Lion public house is the former Cock Inn, the back wall of which is ancient and thought locally to have once formed part of a monastery. Beside this is the grand 19th-century arched entrance to Chatwell Court. A short distance to the north-east of the village can be found the well-preserved remains of a brick kiln. At the south of the village are the sheds of a substantial factory farm.

== See also ==
- Listed buildings in Blymhill and Weston-under-Lizard
