= St Mary's Church, Blymhill =

Church in Staffordshire, England

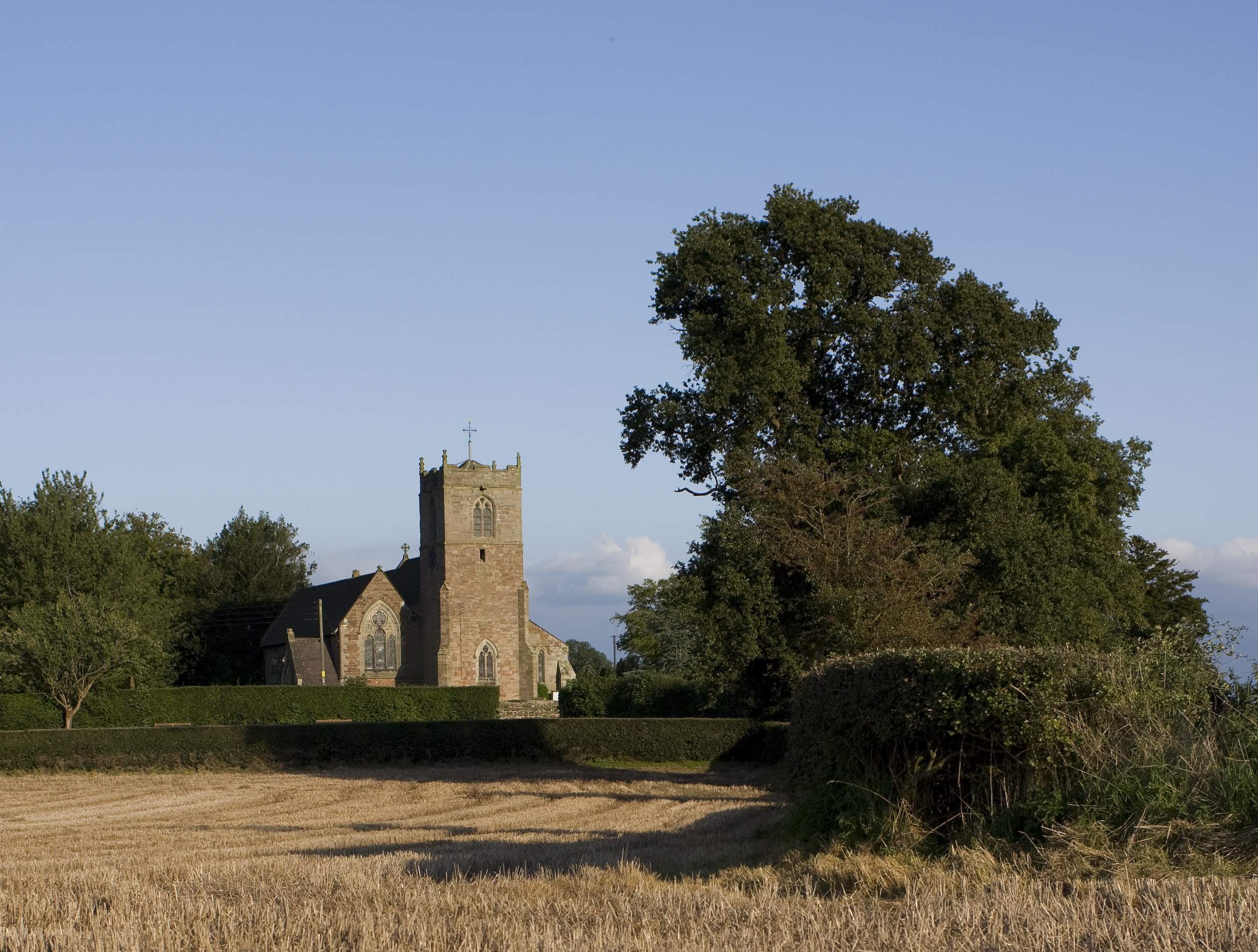
- View of St. Mary's Church, Blymhill from the north.

- Location within Staffordshire

Religion
- Affiliation: Anglican
- District: Diocese of Lichfield
- Ecclesiastical or organizational status: Parish church
- Leadership: Linda Beech, Curate

Location
- Location: Blymhill, Staffordshire, England
- Interactive map of St Mary's Church, Blymhill
- Coordinates: 52.7074°N 2.2849°W

Architecture
- Architect: George Edmund Street
- Type: Church
- Completed: 1859
- Materials: Sandstone

St. Mary's Church, Blymhill is an Anglican church in the village of Blymhill, Staffordshire, England (grid reference SJ808122). The building, which is a Grade I listed building, was constructed in the 14th century and restored and extended in the 18th and 19th centuries. It features an Early English south aisle, a Decorated Gothic chancel and a Perpendicular Gothic tower.

== History ==
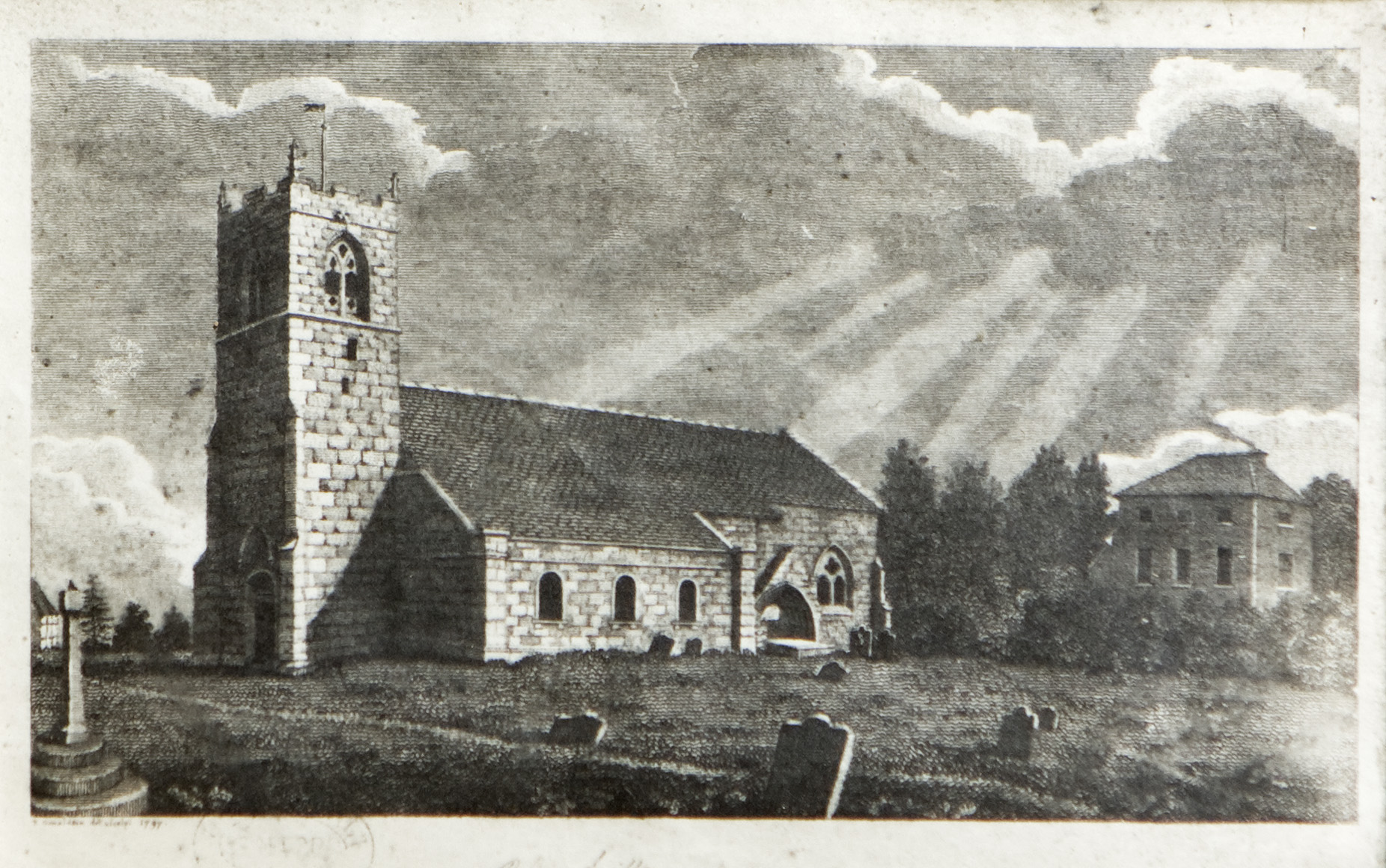
A drawing of St. Mary's in 1797 showing the old rectory building (right) and a black and white cottage that still exists (left).

There has been a church at Blymhill from an early date. Until the end of the 11th century it was attached to the collegiate church of Gnosall, which it served as a chapel of ease. In c. 1200 a separate rectory was established at Blymhill when William, son of John Bagot, the then Lord of Blymhill, acquired the right of presentation of himself and his heirs. A full list of rectors from that date is extant.

The present church dates from the mid 14th century and it probably lies on the same site as the former chapel of ease. It is thought to have been built during the incumbency of Stephen de Bromley who was rector between 1349 and c. 1379. There is an arched recess outside the south wall of the chancel (a position often occupied by the founders tomb) containing a weathered stone coffin that is thought to be Bromley's.

The church underwent significant alterations in c. 1719 during which the Gothic windows of the nave and south aisle were replaced by large and fashionable round-headed windows. A view of the church in 1797, after these alterations, is shown on this page. The Gothic windows were re-introduced during a substantial Early English restoration in 1858–59 by the architect George Street along with the present vestry and new oak choir stalls, oak pews, pulpit and font. The sentences below, from the work authorisation, explain the other major changes:

George Thomas Orlando Bridgeman Clerk Rector ... are authorised and empowered to take down the gallery on the West side (Tower end) and the wall on the north side of the said Church, to widen and extend the same on the North side, to make an aisle on the same side, to stop up the present entrance (through the Tower) and to erect a Porch on the North side, and to erect new roofs over the whole Church.

Street's restoration left the interior too dark so, in 1861, two new plain diamond windows were added to the south wall and in 1876 dormer windows, rarely seen in churches, were built into the south aisle roof.

St. Chad's chapel, at the east end of the north aisle, was constructed in 1936 as a gift of the Rev. E.R.O. Bridgeman. St. Chad is traditionally supposed to have preached in the vicinity of Blymhill in the 7th century and consecrated a well at nearby Chadwell.

== Notable incumbents ==
Dates of incumbency are in parentheses.

- Samuel Dickenson (9 January 1777 – 15 May 1823) – botanist
- George Thomas Orlando Bridgeman (12 November 1853 – 1865) – antiquary

== See also ==
- List of Grade I listed buildings in Staffordshire
- Grade I listed churches in Staffordshire
- Listed buildings in Blymhill and Weston-under-Lizard
