= White Sitch =

Lake in Staffordshire, England

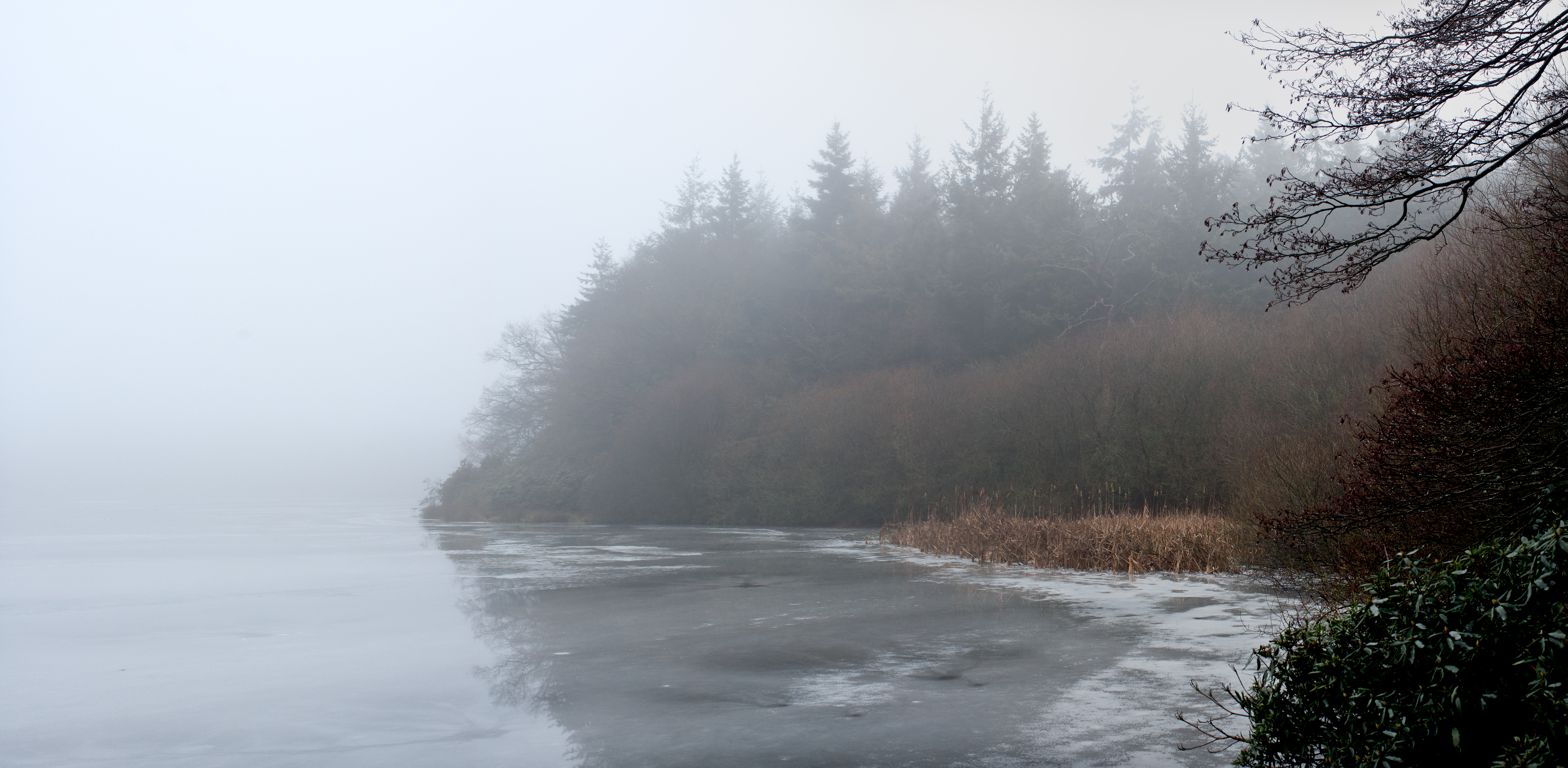
- White Sitch, frozen in winter

- Location within Staffordshire
- Location: Blymhill, Staffordshire
- Coordinates: 52°42′32″N 2°18′40″W
- Type: Reservoir
- Basin countries: England
- Surface area: 0.041 sq mi (0.11 km^{2})
- Islands: 1

White Sitch is a 19th Century designed landscape by John Webb containing a picturesque reservoir in the middle, one mile west of Blymhill in Staffordshire, England. It is situated in a tract of cropped and mixed woodland currently owned by Bradford Estates. The woods are used for commercial plantation forestry and the reservoir for commercial carp fishing.

== Etymology ==
The element 'sytch' is derived from the Old English síc ("siche" in the midlands Middle English dialect). It means a "small stream of water, a rill or streamlet, esp. one flowing through flat or marshy ground, and often dry in summer; a ditch or channel through which a tiny stream flows" and is frequently used in the sense of a boundary. White Sytch lies close to the boundary of the parish.
