= Ornsby Hill =

Village in County Durham, England

Coordinates: 54.82657°N 1.74626°W

Ornsby Hill is a village in County Durham, in England.

Ornsby Hill is situated immediately to the north of Lanchester at the junction of the A691 and A6076 roads. Administratively it forms part of the civil parish of Lanchester.
