= Oxen End =

Hamlet in Essex, England

Coordinates: 51.9353°N 0.417°E

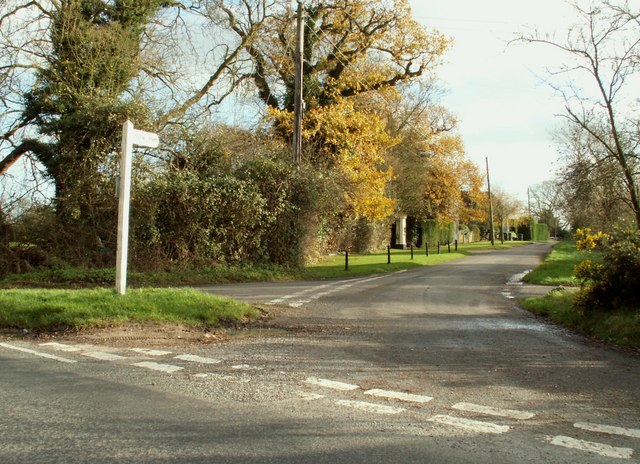
- Oxen End

- Location within Essex
- Civil parish: Little Bardfield
- District: Uttlesford
- Shire county: Essex
- Region: East
- Country: England
- Sovereign state: United Kingdom
- Post town: BRAINTREE
- Police: Essex
- Fire: Essex
- Ambulance: East of England

Oxen End is a hamlet on the B1057 road, in the civil parish of Little Bardfield, in the Uttlesford district, in the English county of Essex. It is located a few miles from the village of Great Bardfield.
