= Orslow =

Hamlet in Staffordshire, England

Coordinates: 52.735°N 2.288°W

- Location within Staffordshire
- OS grid reference: SJ806152
- District: South Staffordshire
- Shire county: Staffordshire
- Region: West Midlands
- Country: England
- Sovereign state: United Kingdom
- Post town: NEWPORT
- Postcode district: TF10
- Police: Staffordshire
- Fire: Staffordshire
- Ambulance: West Midlands
- UK Parliament: Stafford

Orslow is a hamlet in the South Staffordshire district of Staffordshire, England, 1 mile (1.6 km) north-east of Great Chatwell. Its Anglo-Saxon name means 'Horsa's burial mound'. Of note in Orslow is the site of a 13th-century windmill (close to SJ 818156) and Orslow Manor, a red brick farmhouse of about 1800.

== See also ==
- Listed buildings in Blymhill and Weston-under-Lizard
