= Oversland =

Coordinates: 51.277°N 0.947°E

- Location within Kent
- Civil parish: Boughton under Blean
- District: Swale
- Shire county: Kent
- Region: South East
- Country: England
- Sovereign state: United Kingdom
- Post town: Faversham
- Postcode district: ME13 9
- Police: Kent
- Fire: Kent
- Ambulance: South East Coast

Oversland is a hamlet in the Swale district of Kent, England. It is located about 1 mile (1.6 km) to the west of Selling and is situated near Selling railway station. It is in that of the civil parish of Boughton under Blean.
