= Blymhill and Weston-under-Lizard =

Civil parish in Staffordshire, England

- Civil parish
- Blymhill and Weston-under-Lizard
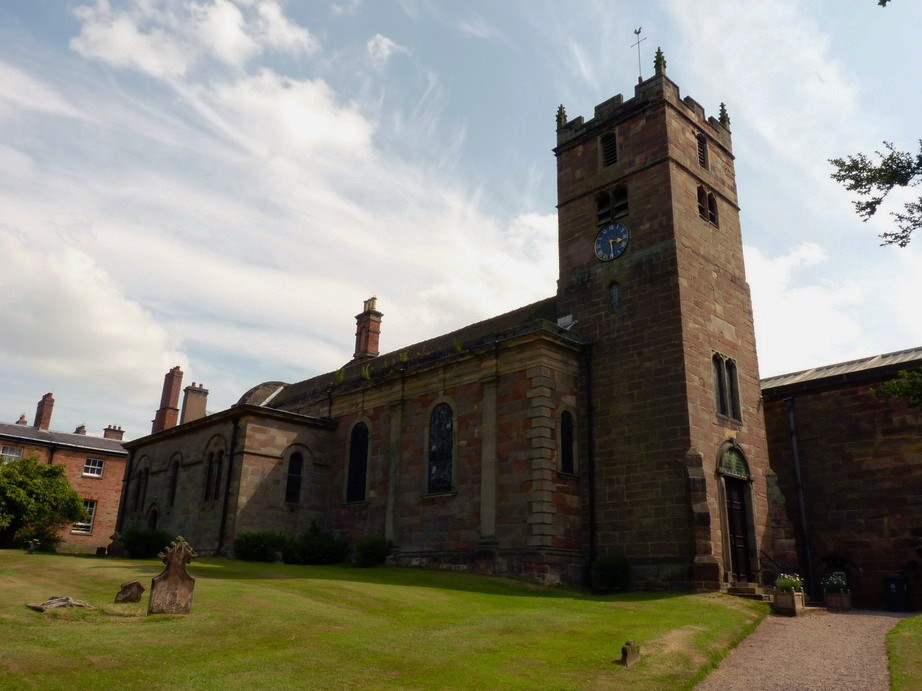
- St Andrew's parish church, Weston-under-Lizard, Staffordshire, seen from the northwest
- Interactive map of Blymhill and Weston-under-Lizard
- Country: England
- County: Staffordshire
- District: South Staffordshire

Population (2011)
  - Total: 823

Blymhill and Weston-under-Lizard is a civil parish in the South Staffordshire district of Staffordshire in England. According to the 2001 census, it had a population of 654, increasing to 823 at the 2011 census. The parish includes Blymhill, Weston-under-Lizard, Brineton, Brockhurst and Orslow. It lies close to the border with the county of Shropshire.

In medieval times, the manor was held by the Brereton family, baronets of Handforth, Cheshire. Charles Brereton, the grandson of Sir William Brereton, 1st Baronet and son of William Brereton, the 2nd Baronet, lived at Blymhill and died without direct heirs in 1674. He was succeeded by his niece Mary Levett, daughter of his sister Susanna and husband of John Levett, barrister of the Inner Temple.

The parish was formed on 1 April 1986 from "Blymhill" and "Weston-under-Lizard".

== See also ==
- Listed buildings in Blymhill and Weston-under-Lizard
