= Willingford Meadows =

Coordinates: 50.976°N 0.357°E

- Site of Special Scientific Interest
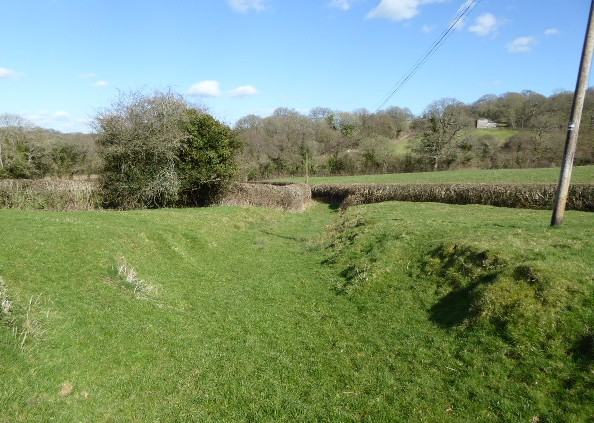
- Location of Willingford Meadows.
- Area of search: East Sussex
- Grid reference: TQ 656 223
- Interest: Biological
- Area: 10.5 hectares (26 acres)
- Notification date: 1990
- Location map: Magic Map

Willingford Meadows is a 10.5-hectare (26-acre) biological Site of Special Scientific Interest south-west of Burwash in East Sussex.

These species-rich meadows are traditionally managed by grazing and mowing. Grassland types range from calcareous to acid and they are the only unimproved pastures on Jurassic limestone in the county. There is also a stream, a marsh, an area of overgrown hornbeam coppice and a mature hazel and hawthorn hedge.

The meadows are crossed by footpaths.
