= Ownham =

Hamlet in Berkshire, England

Coordinates: 51.429992°N 1.395145°W

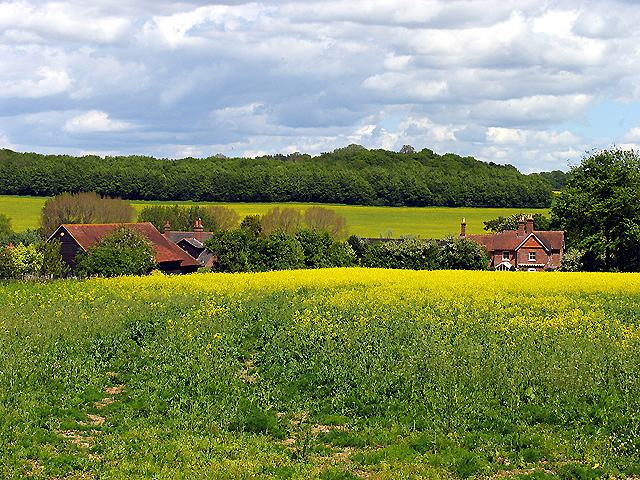
- Coombesbury Farm

- Location within Berkshire
- OS grid reference: SU420704
- Metropolitan borough: West Berkshire
- Metropolitan county: Berkshire
- Region: South East
- Country: England
- Sovereign state: United Kingdom
- Post town: NEWBURY
- Postcode district: RG20
- Dialling code: 01635
- Police: Thames Valley
- Fire: Royal Berkshire
- Ambulance: South Central
- UK Parliament: Newbury

Ownham is a hamlet in Berkshire, England, and part of the civil parish of Boxford (where according to the Grid Ref at the 2011 Census the majority of the hamlet's population was included).

The settlement lies south of the M4 motorway, and is located approximately 4 miles (6.4 km) north-west of Newbury.

Located at the top of a hill above Boxford, the hamlet has views over the Lambourn Valley.

== Archaeology ==
A Roman road Ermin Way that linked Corinium Dobunnorum (Cirencester) and Calleva Atrebatum (Silchester) ran from southeast to northwest through Ownham. It is no longer accessible but is visible from aerial archaeology near William's Copse.

Early man was drawn to settle here because of the clear water supply and river ford in Boxford. Neolithic flints have been found in Ownham.

== Social and economic history ==
Ownham (which has seven dwellings) is formed by a triangle of three historic farmhouses: Ownham Farm (also known as Upper Farm), Old Farm (also known as Ownham Old Farmhouse) and Lower Farm. Other notable historic buildings are a farm tenant's thatched cottage, a chapel of ease and a merchant house. All buildings are now residential. Two of the buildings in Ownham are Grade II listed.

The road through Ownham does not have a name and most dwelling addresses are three digit numbers corresponding to historic farm plot numbers ("xxx Ownham").

Much of the surrounding farmland is part of Sir Richard Sutton's Settled Estates. The 6,500-acre property is given over to a variety of arable crops including wheat, barley, peas and beans, as well as a beef herd and sheep.

The area around Ownham has a higher proportion of forestry than elsewhere in the Parish.

On 12 June 2016 a civic street ceremony and party took place in Ownham to celebrate the Queen's 90th birthday.

== Transport ==
Ownham lies on an unnamed road between Coombesbury Lane and Lambourn Road with a short no through road spur. The unnamed road was resurfaced in August 2013 by West Berkshire council.

Before the resurfacing the unnamed road was one continuous road with the spur giving right of way. At the end of the works road markings were applied that made the spur and the lower part of the unnamed road one continuous road. The upper part of the unnamed road which runs from Coombesbury Lane now gives right of way at the spur. The change in road layout is likely to be a mistake as no record of a planned change exists.

Ownham has two footpaths that historically were functional rights of way for the farming community. One footpath (Boxford Parish Path 14) links Ownham to the Wickham Heath bus stop for route 4 Newbury to Lambourn. The other footpath (Boxford Parish Path 17) runs from the heart of Ownham to an isolated section of the B4000.
