= Oxley College =

Oxley College can refer to either one of two schools in Australia:

- Oxley College (Burradoo), in New South Wales
- Oxley College (Chirnside Park), in Victoria
