= Outlands, Staffordshire =

Hamlet in Staffordshire, England

Coordinates: 52.86698°N 2.34310°W

Outlands is a hamlet in the English county of Staffordshire. It lies 1 km east of Bishop's Offley.
