= Oxley's Green =

Hamlet in East Sussex

Coordinates: 50.9686°N 0.4082°E

- Location within East Sussex
- Civil parish: Brightling
- District: Rother
- Shire county: East Sussex
- Region: South East
- Country: England
- Sovereign state: United Kingdom
- Police: Sussex
- Fire: East Sussex
- Ambulance: South East Coast

Oxley's Green is a hamlet in the civil parish of Brightling, in the Rother district, in the county of East Sussex, England. It lies in the High Weald, approximately 5 miles north-west of Battle and 4 miles west of Robertsbridge.

== Geography ==
Oxley's Green lies within the High Weald, a landscape characterised by wooded hills, small fields, ancient hedgerows and scattered settlements. The hamlet is located approximately 5 miles north-west of Battle and 11 miles north-west of Hastings. The settlement has the postcode TN32 5HD and uses Robertsbridge as its post town.

== History ==
Oxley's Green developed as a small rural settlement within the parish of Brightling. Its name is recorded in historical sources as Oxley's Green, and the area has traditionally been associated with agriculture and woodland.

One of the best-known historical connections to the hamlet is the former Fuller's Arms Inn. The inn, which dates from around the early 19th century, was situated in the hamlet and later operated as a public house and restaurant. Its associated stables survive as a Grade II listed building.

== Listed buildings ==
Several historic buildings in and around Oxley's Green are included on the National Heritage List for England. The Glebe House, on Oxley's Green Lane, is a Grade II listed building. The oldest part of the house is a timber-framed structure dating from the 17th century or earlier. The Stables of the Fuller's Arms Inn are also Grade II listed. The building dates from the 18th century and is constructed principally of red brick with grey headers and a tiled roof.
