= Weston-under-Lizard =

Village in Staffordshire, England

Coordinates: 52.695°N 2.286°W

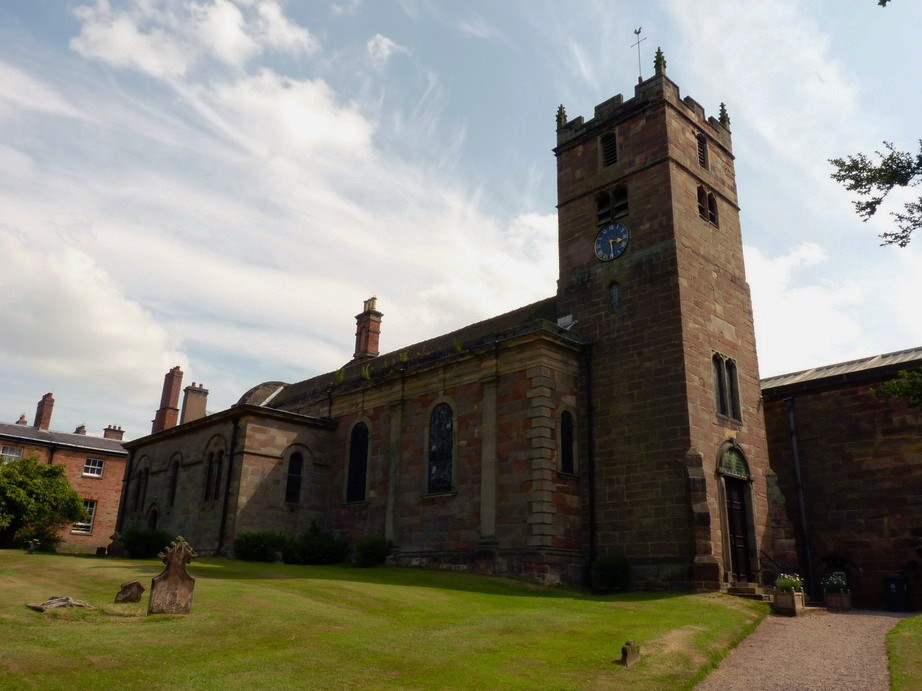
- St Andrew's Church, Weston-under-Lizard

- Location within Staffordshire
- Civil parish: Blymhill and Weston-under-Lizard
- District: South Staffordshire
- Shire county: Staffordshire
- Region: West Midlands
- Country: England
- Sovereign state: United Kingdom
- Post town: Shifnal
- Postcode district: TF11
- Police: Staffordshire
- Fire: Staffordshire
- Ambulance: West Midlands
- UK Parliament: Stone, Great Wyrley and Penkridge

Weston-under-Lizard is a village and former civil parish, now in the parish of Blymhill and Weston-under-Lizard, in the South Staffordshire district of Staffordshire, England. It is known as Weston-under-Lizard (the name of a hill in nearby Shropshire) to distinguish it from Weston-on-Trent. It should not be confused with the village of Weston, to the north east of Stafford. In 1961 the parish had a population of 294. On 1 April 1986 the parish was abolished and merged with Blymhill to form "Blymhill and Weston-under-Lizard".

The village is on the A5 (here following the course of Watling Street), and is very close to the county boundary with Shropshire. Nearby places are Blymhill, within Staffordshire, and Tong in Shropshire. To the south of the village is Weston Park, the ancestral home of the Earls of Bradford and, until 2017, the venue for the V Festival.

A variation in the spelling of the village name may be seen in an old Law record.

== Church of St Andrew ==
Associated with and within the grounds of Weston Park, the Church of St Andrew is a Grade I listed Anglican church. Its origins are medieval, but it was largely rebuilt in the very early 18th century by Elizabeth Wilbraham of Weston Park, and restored in the 19th century, firstly by George Edmund Street and then by Ewan Christian. It remains an active parish church in the Diocese of Lichfield. Writer Honora Sneyd was buried here.

== See also ==
- Listed buildings in Blymhill and Weston-under-Lizard

== Bibliography ==
- The William Salt Archaeological Society, ed. (1899). Collections for a history of Staffordshire Volume XX New Series Volume II History of the Manor and Parish of Weston-under-Lizard, in the County of Stafford. London: Harrison and Sons.
