= Oxley Green =

Hamlet in Essex, England

Coordinates: 51.7942°N 0.7707°E

- Location within Essex
- Civil parish: Tolleshunt D'arcy
- District: Maldon
- Shire county: Essex
- Region: East
- Country: England
- Sovereign state: United Kingdom
- Police: Essex
- Fire: Essex
- Ambulance: East of England

Oxley Green is a hamlet on the B1023 road, in between the villages of Tiptree and Tolleshunt D'Arcy, in the civil parish of Tolleshunt D'arcy, in the Maldon District of Essex, England.
