= Blymhill =

Village in Staffordshire, England

Coordinates: 52.7011°N 2.2836°W

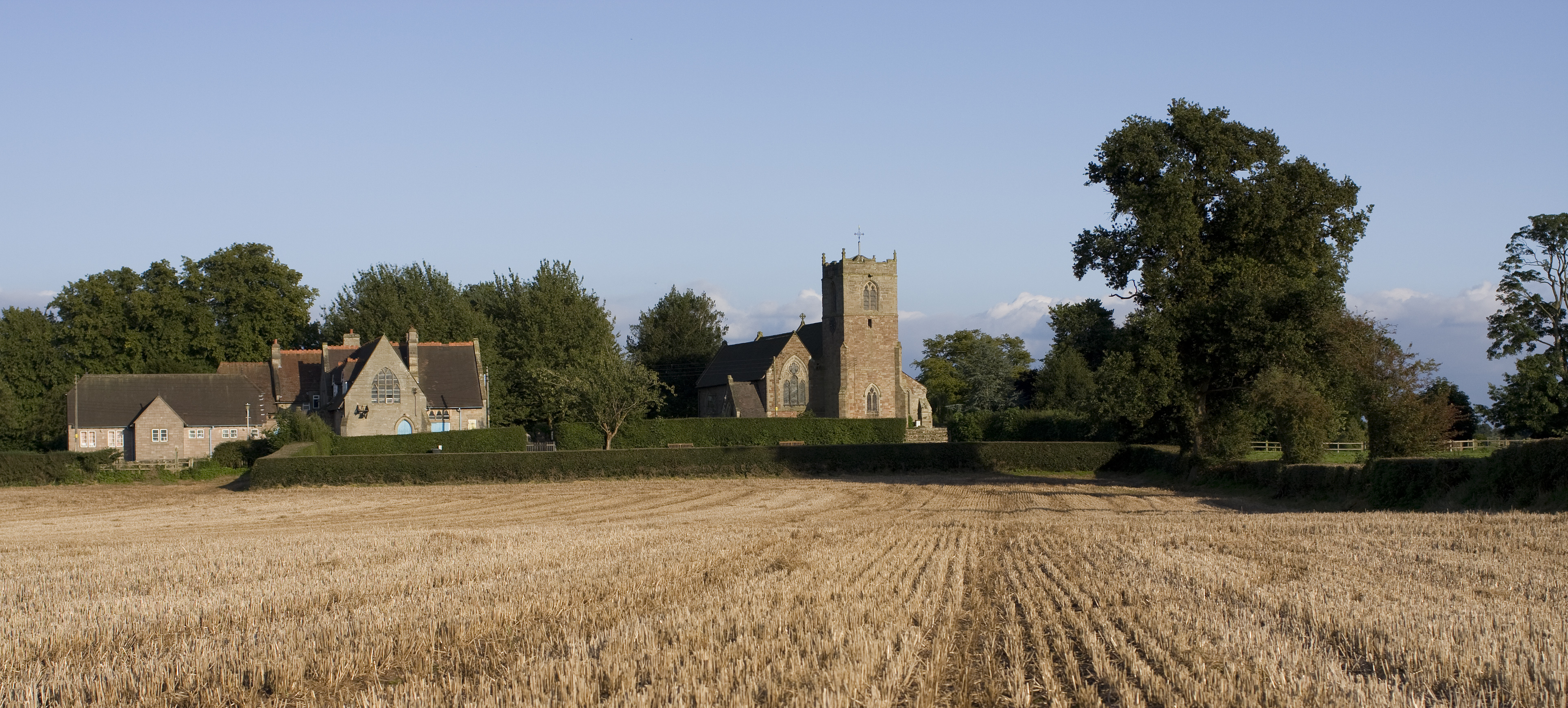
- View of Blymhill from the north showing the old school (left) and church (right).

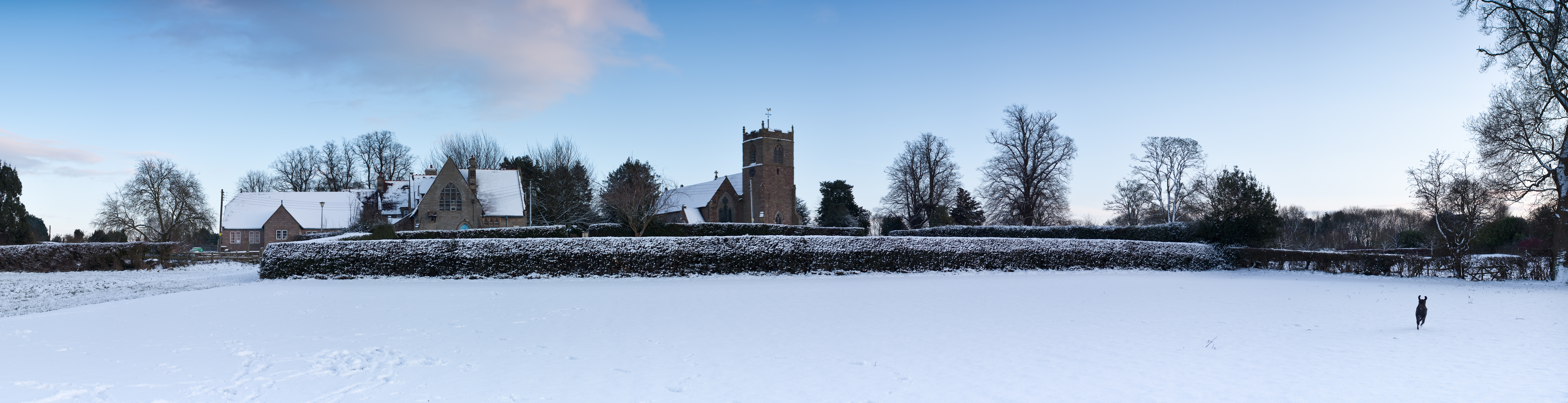
- A similar view in winter

- Location within Staffordshire
- OS grid reference: SJ808121
- Civil parish: Blymhill and Weston-under-Lizard
- District: South Staffordshire
- Shire county: Staffordshire
- Region: West Midlands
- Country: England
- Sovereign state: United Kingdom
- Post town: Shifnal
- Postcode district: TF11
- Dialling code: 01952
- Police: Staffordshire
- Fire: Staffordshire
- Ambulance: West Midlands
- UK Parliament: Stone, Great Wyrley and Penkridge

Blymhill is a village and former civil parish, now in the parish of Blymhill and Weston-under-Lizard, in the South Staffordshire district, in the county of Staffordshire, England. It has a church called St Mary's Church. In 1961 the parish had a population of 459. On 1 April 1986 the parish was abolished and merged with Weston-under-Lizard to form "Blymhill and Weston-under-Lizard".

== See also ==
- Listed buildings in Blymhill and Weston-under-Lizard
- White Sitch
