= TF postcode area =

Postcode area within the United Kingdom

Telford
- Postcode area
- Coordinates: 52.717°N 2.461°W
- Country: United Kingdom
- Postcode area: TF
- Postcode area name: Telford
- Post towns: 6
- Postcode districts: 13
- Postcode sectors: 43
- Postcodes (live): 6,978
- Postcodes (total): 9,230
- Statistics as at May 2020

The TF postcode area, also known as the Telford postcode area, is a group of thirteen postcode districts in England, within six post towns. These cover north-east Shropshire, including Telford, Broseley, Market Drayton, Much Wenlock, Newport and Shifnal, plus a small part of west Staffordshire.

== Coverage ==
The approximate coverage of the postcode districts:

Postcode district	Post town	Coverage	Local authority area(s)
TF1	TELFORD	Wellington, Leegomery, Hadley, Ketley, Arleston, Hortonwood	Telford & Wrekin
TF2	TELFORD	Oakengates, Priorslee, St. Georges, Donnington, Wrockwardine Wood, Muxton	Telford & Wrekin
TF3	TELFORD	Telford Town Centre and Park, Hollinswood, Randlay, Stirchley, Brookside, Stafford Park	Telford & Wrekin
TF4	TELFORD	Dawley, Malinslee, Lawley, Horsehay	Telford & Wrekin
TF5	TELFORD	Admaston, Bratton, Shawbirch	Telford & Wrekin
TF6	TELFORD	The Wrekin, Wrockwardine, Longden-upon-Tern, High Ercall	Telford & Wrekin
TF7	TELFORD	Madeley, Woodside, Sutton Hill, Halesfield	Telford & Wrekin
TF8	TELFORD	Ironbridge, Coalbrookdale, Coalport, Jackfield	Telford & Wrekin
TF9	MARKET DRAYTON	Market Drayton, Loggerheads, Hodnet, Ternhill	Shropshire, Newcastle-under-Lyme
TF10	NEWPORT	Newport, Lilleshall, Edgmond, Moreton, Great Chatwell, Orslow	Telford & Wrekin, Stafford, South Staffordshire
TF11	SHIFNAL	Shifnal, Tong, Weston-under-Lizard	Shropshire, South Staffordshire
TF12	BROSELEY	Broseley	Shropshire
TF13	MUCH WENLOCK	Much Wenlock	Shropshire

== Map ==
TF postcode area map, showing postcode districts in red and post towns in grey text, with links to nearby CW, ST, SY and WV postcode areas.

== See also ==
- Postcode Address File
- List of postcode areas in the United Kingdom
