= Ouston, Stamfordham =

Village in Northumberland, England

Coordinates: 55.0289°N 1.8842°W

Ouston
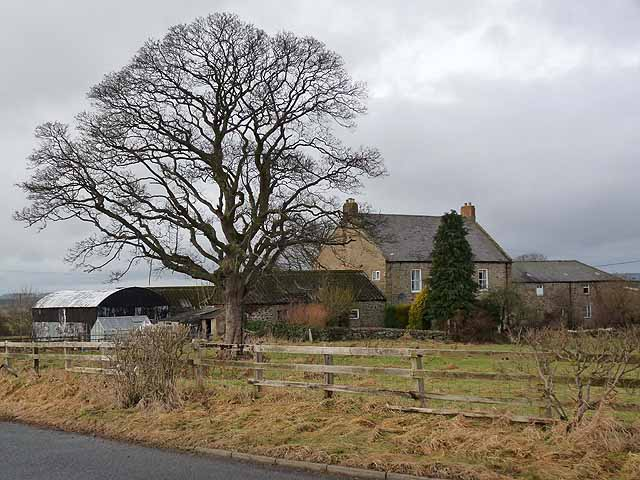
- Ouston Farm

- Location within Northumberland
- OS grid reference: NZ075705
- Civil parish: Stamfordham
- Unitary authority: Northumberland
- Ceremonial county: Northumberland
- Region: North East
- Country: England
- Sovereign state: United Kingdom
- Post town: Newcastle-upon-Tyne
- Postcode district: NE18
- Dialling code: 01661
- Police: Northumbria
- Fire: Northumberland
- Ambulance: North East
- UK Parliament: Hexham

Ouston is a village and former civil parish, now in the parish of Stamfordham, in the county of Northumberland, England. In 1951 the parish had a population of 13.

Ouston lies near the course of Hadrian's Wall, probably the most noted Roman monument in Britain.

== Governance ==
Ouston was formerly a township in Stamfordham parish, from 1866 Ouston was a civil parish in its own right until it was abolished on 1 April 1955 to form Stamfordham.

== See also ==
- RAF Ouston
