= Ouston, Ninebanks =

Coordinates: 54.8667°N 2.3520°W

Ouston
- Location within Northumberland
- OS grid reference: NY775525
- Civil parish: Plenmeller with Whitfield
- Unitary authority: Northumberland
- Ceremonial county: Northumberland
- Region: North East
- Country: England
- Sovereign state: United Kingdom
- Post town: Hexham
- Postcode district: NE47
- Police: Northumbria
- Fire: Northumberland
- Ambulance: North East
- UK Parliament: Hexham

Ouston is a small settlement in south west Northumberland, England in the North Pennines Area of Outstanding Natural Beauty 8 miles (13 km) north-east of Alston by road, and just west of Ninebanks.
