= Outwoods, Stafford =

Hamlet in Staffordshire, England

Coordinates: 52.76007°N 2.32003°W

Outwoods is a hamlet in the English county of Staffordshire.

Outwoods is located in the extreme west of the county near to the town of Newport, Shropshire. It forms part of the civil parish of Gnosall and the borough of Stafford.
