= List of new churches by G. E. Street =

List of churches

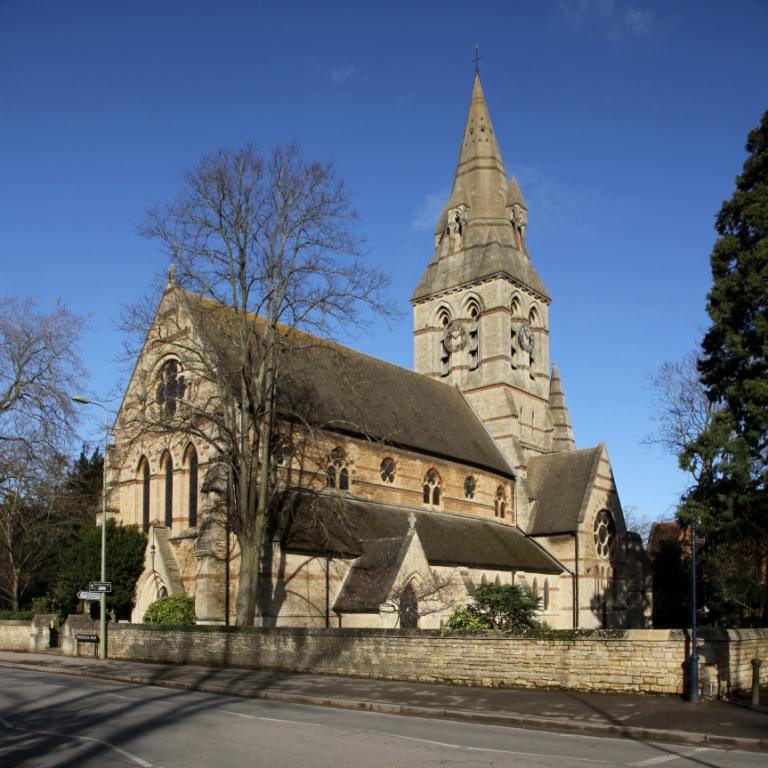
Former parish church of SS Philip and James, Oxford

G. E. Street (1824–81) was an English architect and architectural writer, whose designs were mainly in High Victorian Gothic style. Born the son of a solicitor, he first worked in a law office, but was then articled to the architect Owen Browne Carter in Winchester. Two years later, in 1844, he moved to London and worked in the office of George Gilbert Scott. Here he also worked with George Frederick Bodley and William White. Street established his own architectural practice in 1849, initially in London, and later in Wantage (then in Berkshire). He was appointed as architect to the diocese of Oxford in 1850, and retained this position until his death. He married in 1852 and in that year moved to Oxford. He returned to London in 1856 and maintained an office there for the remainder of his career. He travelled extensively, visiting the Continent of Europe frequently. Street was also a prolific writer on architectural subjects. He was a member of the Royal Academy, and in 1874 was awarded the Royal Gold Medal of the Royal Institute of British Architects, being its president in 1881.

Most of Street's works were in relation to churches; designing new churches, restoring and making additions and alterations to existing churches, and designing fittings and furnishings for them. He also designed domestic buildings, especially vicarages, and schools with houses for the schoolmaster. He designed little in the way of public buildings, although towards the end of his life he designed what has been described as his "greatest commission", the Royal Courts of Justice in London. Most of his works were in England, especially within and close to the diocese of Oxford, where he built or restored 113 churches, but examples of his work can be found throughout England, Wales and Ireland. He also designed some buildings abroad, including a church in Constantinople. Almost all his designs are in Gothic Revival style, in particular, in what is known as the High Victorian style. This style came chronologically after the use of "pure" and "correct" use of features of English Gothic architecture, which had been championed by A. W. N. Pugin and the Ecclesiological Society. High Victorian incorporated the use of polychromy, and elements of Continental forms of Gothic architecture. Street died in 1881, and was buried in Westminster Abbey.

This list contains new churches designed by Street and built in England, Scotland and Wales. He also designed churches elsewhere (seven on the Continent, of which three in Switzerland), as well as the Crimea Memorial Church in Istanbul, Turkey, built between 1858 and 1868, and St Paul's American Church in Rome, designed between 1872 and 1876.

== Key ==
Grade (England)	Criteria
Grade I	Buildings of exceptional interest, sometimes considered to be internationally important.
Grade II*	Particularly important buildings of more than special interest.
Grade II	Buildings of national importance and special interest.
Category (Scotland)	Criteria
Category A	Buildings of national or international importance, either architectural or historic, or fine little-altered examples of some particular period, style or building type.
Category B	Buildings of regional or more than local importance, or major examples of some particular period, style or building type which may have been altered.
Category C(S)	Buildings of local importance, lesser examples of any period, style, or building type, as originally constructed or moderately altered; and simple traditional buildings which group well with others in categories A and B.
"—" denotes a work that is not graded.

== Churches ==
Name	Location	Photograph	Date	Notes	Grade
St Mary's Church	Par, Cornwall, Cornwall; 50.3502°N 4.7310°W		1848		II*
St Peter's Church	Treverbyn, Cornwall; 50.3802°N 4.7910°W		1848–50		II
St Mary's Church	Colton, Staffordshire; 52.7813°N 1.9309°W		1850–52	A new church incorporating a 13th-century tower and chapel. Street also designed two of the monuments.	II*
St James' Church	Eastbury, Berkshire; 51.4926°N 1.5028°W		1851–53		II
St John's Mission Church	Bournemouth, Dorset; 50.7548°N 1.8746°W		1853	Originated as a mission church, later known as Old St John's Buildings, and used commercially.	II
St John the Evangelist's Church	Little Tew, Oxfordshire; 51.9540°N 1.4420°W		1853		II
St Michael's Church	Sandhurst, Berkshire; 51.3499°N 0.8156°W		1853		II*
St Simon and St Jude's Church	Milton-under-Wychwood, Oxfordshire; 51.8661°N 1.6168°W		1853–54		II
All Saints Church	Maidenhead, Berkshire; 51.5199°N 0.7367°W		1854–57	Additions made in 1907–11.	I
St. Peter's Church	Bournemouth, Dorset 50.7205°N 1.8755°W		1855-1879	A new town-centre church incorporating part of the previous church building.	I
St Peter's Church	Filkins, Oxfordshire; 51.7359°N 1.6579°W		1855–57		II
St Mary's Church	Wheatley, Oxfordshire; 51.7476°N 1.1366°W		1855–57		II*
St Andrew's Church	Firsby, Lincolnshire; 53.1410°N 0.1739°E		1856		II
Chapel	Cotshill Hospital, Chipping Norton, Oxfordshire; 51.9448°N 1.5386°W		1856–57		II
All Saints Church	Roydon, Norfolk; 52.7837°N 0.5180°E		1857	A new church incorporating 12th-century doorways and a 13th-century tower.	II*
All Saints Church	Nash, Buckinghamshire; 51.9990°N 0.8635°W		1857–58		II
St Thomas' Church	Watchfield, Oxfordshire; 51.6107°N 1.6467°W		1857–58		II
St James' Church	New Bradwell, Milton Keynes, Buckinghamshire; 52.0654°N 0.7932°W		1857–60	The north aisle, also designed by Street, was added in 1897.	II*
St Paul's Church	Herne Hill, Southwark, Greater London; 51.4548°N 0.0994°W		1858		II*
St James' Church	Pokesdown, Bournemouth, Dorset; 50.7329°N 1.8218°W		1858	Originally consisted of a nave, chancel and south porch; north aisle added in 1870 to Street's design. The church was further extended in 1928–31.	II
All Saints Church	Winterbourne, Gloucestershire; 51.5150°N 2.5047°W		1858		II
St John the Evangelist's Church	Whitwell-on-the-Hill, North Yorkshire; 54.0838°N 0.8945°W		1858–60		II*
St Anne's Church	Wycombe, Buckinghamshire; 51.6191°N 0.7172°W		1859		II
St John's Church	Howsham, North Yorkshire; 54.0567°N 0.8750°W		1859–60	For Hannah Cholmley.	I
Church of St James the Less	City of Westminster, Greater London; 51.4907°N 0.1353°W		1859–61	The railings at the sides of the porch leading into the church were also designed by Street and are listed at Grade II*.	I
St John's Church	Hollington, Staffordshire; 52.9467°N 1.9131°W		1859–61	Built as a chapel of ease.	II
Convent Chapel	All Saints House, Westminster, Greater London; 51.5169°N 0.1384°W		1860		II
St Peter's Church	Chalvey, Slough, Berkshire; 51.5068°N 0.6083°W		1860–61		II*
St John's Church	Kingstone, Staffordshire; 52.8628°N 1.9116°W		1860–61	The south aisle was designed by Street.	II
St John the Evangelist's Church	Stourbridge, West Midlands; 52.4554°N 2.1423°W		1860–61		II
All Saints Church	Denstone, Staffordshire; 52.9653°N 1.8521°W		1860–62	For Sir Thomas Percival Heywood.	II*
All Saints Church	Coleshill, Buckinghamshire; 51.6471°N 0.6321°W		1861		II*
St George's Church	St George's, Telford, Shropshire; 52.6953°N 2.4319°W		1861		II
St John the Evangelist's Church	Torquay, Devon; 50.4627°N 3.5247°W		1861–73	Tower completed by A. E. Street in 1884–85 to his father's design.	I
All Saints Church	Brightwalton, Berkshire; 51.5120°N 1.3863°W		1862	Upgraded from Grade II to Grade II* status in December 2017.	II*
SS Philip and James Church	Oxford; 51.7644°N 1.2640°W		1862	A new church considered to be one of Street's best. Since 1983 the building has been used as the Oxford Centre for Mission Studies.	I
Church of St Elldeyrn	Capel Llanilltern, Pentyrch, Cardiff		1862	A small and simple chapel, Street had previously restored the nearby St Mary's in St Fagans.	II
St Barnabas' Church	Hurn, Dorset; 50.7742°N 1.8201°W		1862–63	A small chapel.	II
St Anne's Church	Whelford, Gloucestershire; 51.6885°N 1.7573°W		1863–64	A chapel of ease.	II
St Editha's Church	Amington, Tamworth, Staffordshire; 52.6379°N 1.6537°W		1864		II
St Saviour's Church	Branston, Staffordshire; 52.7876°N 1.6678°W		1864	A new church, later enlarged.	
St John the Evangelist's Church	Warminster, Wiltshire; 51.2005°N 2.1662°W		1864–65	Later additions by other architects.	II*
St Michael's Church	Waters Upton, Shropshire; 52.7713°N 2.5439°W		1864–65	Replacing a Georgian church, a new church in Early English style.	II
St Nicholas' Church	Whiston, Merseyside; 53.4069°N 2.8030°W		1864–68		II
St Peter's Church	Malvern, Worcestershire; 52.1260°N 2.3381°W		1865		II
Chapel	Uppingham School, Rutland; 52.5876°N 0.7246°W		1865	With later alterations.	II*
St Saviour and St Peter's Church	Eastbourne, East Sussex; 50.7659°N 0.2829°E		1865–66	New church; tower added 1870–72. Later additions by different architects.	II*
Workhouse chapel	Shipmeadow, Suffolk; 52.4543°N 1.500°E		1865–66	A chapel for the Wangford Hundred workhouse. Later used as a farm store.	II
St James the Great's Church	Blakedown, Worcestershire; 52.4042°N 2.1767°W		1866		II
St Mary's Church	Fawley, Berkshire; 51.5300°N 1.4374°W		1866	Upgraded from Grade II to Grade II* status in December 2017.	II*
All Saints Church	Monkland, Herefordshire; 52.2146°N 2.7913°W		1866	Rebuilding, incorporating some earlier fabric.	II*
Chapel	Royal National Hospital, Bournemouth, Dorset; 50.7226°N 1.8827°W		1866–67		II
St Andrew's Church	Church Aston, Shropshire; 52.7577°N 2.3817°W		1866–67	A new church replacing an earlier church.	II
St Benedict Biscop Church	Wombourne, Staffordshire; 52.535623°N 2.182913°W		1866–67	A new church replacing an earlier church, retaining 14th century west tower.	II
St Mary's Church	Westcott, Buckinghamshire; 51.8483°N 0.9609°W		1867		II*
St Mary's Church	Whixall, Shropshire; 52.9090°N 2.7182°W		1867		II
St Mary Magdalene's Church	Paddington, Westminster, Greater London; 51.5225°N 0.1890°W		1867–78	Crypt Chapel added in 1895 by Sir Ninian Comper.	I
Church of the Resurrection and All Saints	Caldy, Merseyside; 53.3584°N 3.1641°W		1868	Built originally as a school. Converted into a church in 1906–07 by Douglas and Minshull.	II
St Mary the Virgin's Church	Wansford, East Yorkshire; 53.9950°N 0.3813°W		1868	For Sir Tatton Sykes, 5th Baronet of Sledmere.	II*
Church of the Resurrection	Eastleigh, Hampshire; 50.9713°N 1.3512°W		1868–69	Later additions by different architects.	II
Holy Trinity Church	Eltham, Greenwich, Greater London; 51.4483°N 0.0645°E		1868–69	New church, since extended.	II
St Cynbryd's Church	Llanddulas, Conwy, Wales; 53.2896°N 3.6389°W		1868–69	New church replacing an older one of 1732.	II*
St Margaret's Church	Liverpool, Merseyside; 53.3956°N 2.9661°W		1868–69		II*
St James' Church	Milnrow, Greater Manchester; 53.6122°N 2.1092°W		1868–69		II
St Stephen's Church	Robin Hood's Bay, North Yorkshire; 54.4341°N 0.5390°W		1868–70		II*
St Mary's Church	Thixendale, North Yorkshire; 54.0388°N 0.7154°W		1868–72	For Sir Tatton Sykes, 5th Baronet of Sledmere.	II*
All Saints Church	Clifton, Bristol; 51.4623°N 2.6161°W		1868–72	Severely damaged by a bomb in 1940, since rebuilt retaining Street's surviving tower.	II
St Michael and All Angels Church	Frosterley, County Durham; 54.7268°N 1.9602°W		1869	The gate piers to the northeast of the church are also listed at Grade II.	II
St Andrew's Church	Kettering, Northamptonshire; 52.4029°N 0.7260°W		1869		II
St Peter's Church	Swinton, Greater Manchester; 53.5119°N 2.3414°W		1869	Built to replace a chapel of ease, for Revd H. R. Heywood.	II*
All Saints Church	Bolton, Greater Manchester; 53.5819°N 2.4271°W		1869–71		II
St John the Evangelist's Church	Lyneal, Shropshire; 52.8907°N 2.8370°W		1870	Built for Marian, Viscountess Alford, as a memorial for her son the second Earl Brownlow.	II*
St Mary's Church	Purley on Thames, Berkshire; 51.4795°N 1.0404°W		1870		II*
Holy Trinity Church	Thurgoland, South Yorkshire; 53.5059°N 1.5663°W		1870		II
Christ Church	Barnston, Merseyside; 53.3409°N 3.0821°W		1870–71		II
St Andrew's Waterside Chapel	Gravesend, Kent; 51.4447°N 0.3716°E		1870–71	Built as a mission for seamen. Later used as an arts centre.	II
St Mary on the Rock's Episcopal Church	Ellon, Aberdeenshire, Scotland; 57.3617°N 2.0716°W		1870–71		A
St John the Evangelist's Episcopal Church	New Pitsligo, Aberdeenshire, Scotland; 57.5931°N 2.1975°W		1870–71		A
St John the Divine's Church	Kennington, Greater London; 51.4776°N 0.1062°W		1870–74	The tower and spire were added by his son A. E. Street in 1888–89.	I
St Mary's Church	Fimber, East Yorkshire; 54.0339°N 0.6361°W		1871	For Sir Tatton Sykes, 5th Baronet of Sledmere.	II
St James' Church	West Malvern, Worcestershire; 52.1128°N 2.3470°W		1871	Rebuilding of a previous church.	II
All Saints Church (former)	Darlaston, West Midlands; 52.5694°N 2.0261°W		1871–72	All Saints was destroyed by enemy action in July 1942, the only church in the diocese of Lichfield to be so destroyed. It was replaced by a new church on the same site in 1951–52.	
St Mary's Church	Towyn, Conwy, Wales; 53.3018°N 3.5419°W		1872–73	New church. Street also designed the stained glass in one of the windows, and altar frontals.	II*
St John the Baptist's Church	Bettisfield, Wrexham, Wales; 52.9189°N 2.8026°W		1872–74	New church. Street also designed the lychgate.	II*
St John the Baptist's Church	Withington, Shropshire; 52.7128°N 2.6278°W		1872–74	A new church on the site of a 12th-century church.	II
St Peter's Church	Helperthorpe, North Yorkshire; 54.1207°N 0.5437°W		1872–75	For Sir Tatton Sykes. Later additions by other architects. The churchyard wall and gates were also designed by Street, and are listed at Grade II.	II
St Peter's Church	Highfields, Leicester; 52.6300°N 1.1164°W		1872–79		II
St John the Evangelist's Church	Ashley Green, Buckinghamshire; 51.7371°N 0.5873°W		1873		II*
St John the Baptist's Church	Bournemouth, Dorset; 50.7499°N 1.8780°W		1873–74	The nave, south aisle and tower base were built by Street. Additions were made in 1886–87, and in 1923.	II
St Peter's Church	Little Aston, Staffordshire; 52.6011°N 1.8654°W		1873–74	A chapel of ease for Edward Swynfen Parker-Jervis of Little Aston Hall. Fittings, including the reredos, pulpit, stalls, seats, organ case, and font, were also designed by Street.	II
All Saints' Church	Middlesbrough, North Yorkshire; 54.5742°N 1.2368°W		1873–78		II*
St Andrew's Church	Toddington, Gloucestershire; 51.9962°N 1.9505°W		1873–79	For Lord Sudeley.	I
St James' Church	Kingston, Dorset; 50.6157°N 2.0642°W		1873–80	For the 3rd Earl of Eldon at a cost of £70,000 (equivalent to £6,970,000 in 2023). Clifton-Taylor describes it as "the most perfect Victorian church", and "a cathedral in miniature".	I
St John's Church	Cotebrook, Cheshire; 53.1855°N 2.6430°W		1874–75		II
St Mary's Church	West Lutton, North Yorkshire; 54.1105°N 0.5780°W		1874–75	For Sir Tatton Sykes.	II*
Chapel	Luton Hoo, Bedfordshire; 51.8546°N 0.3977°W		1875	Chapel added in Byzantine style.	I
St Michael's Church	Wigan, Greater Manchester; 53.5540°N 2.6299°W		1875–78		II*
Royal Military Chapel	Wellington Barracks, City of Westminster, Greater London; 51.5004°N 0.1354°W		1875–79	Built as a replacement for an earlier chapel. Other than the apse, it was destroyed in 1944.	II
St Andrew's Church	East Heslerton, North Yorkshire; 54.1773°N 0.5826°W		1877	A new church for Sir Tatton Sykes of Sledmere House on the site of earlier churches. It is now redundant, and is under the care of the Churches Conservation Trust.	I
Christ Church	Lausanne, Switzerland; 46.5143°N 6.6305°E		1877-78	New church.	II
St Andrew's Church	Minehead, Somerset; 51.2051°N 3.4789°W		1877–80	The walls, gates and gatepiers were also designed by Street, and are listed at Grade II.	II*
St Giles' Church	Blaston, Leicestershire; 52.5509°N 0.8176°W		1878		II
Anglican Church	Mürren, Switzerland; 46.5667°N 7.8833°E		1878		
St Mary's Church	Southampton, Hampshire; 50.9028°N 1.3952°W		1878–84	Severely damaged in the Second World War; rebuilt in 1954–56 retaining Street's steeple.	II
St John's Church	Carlton, South Yorkshire; 53.5867°N 1.4483°W		1879		II
St Mary's Church	Holmbury St Mary, Surrey; 51.1883°N 0.4132°W		1879	Extended to the west in 1966.	I
St Lawrence's Church	Tinsley, Sheffield, South Yorkshire; 53.4111°N 1.3932°W		1879		II
Rake Mission Church	Rake, West Sussex; 51.0422°N 0.8587°W		1879	Built as a chapel of ease to the contemporary church at Milland. Deconsecrated and converted for residential use.	
St Luke's Church	Milland, West Sussex; 51.0477°N 0.8244°W		1879–80	^{[A]}	II
St Saviour's Church	Erlestoke, Wiltshire; 51.2845°N 2.0516°W		1880	For Lady Hannah Watson-Taylor of Erlestoke Park.	II
St Mary's Church	Long Ditton, Surrey; 51.3805°N 0.3169°W		1880		II
All Saints Church	Vevey, Switzerland; 46.6000°N 6.85°E		1880–1882	New church	
St James' Church	Paddington, Westminster, Greater London; 51.5130°N 0.1765°W		1881	New church incorporating the chancel of an 1841–43 church as a chapel.	II*
All Saints Church	Ffynnongroyw, Flintshire, Wales; 53.3300°N 3.2975°W		1881–82	New church, completed posthumously. Street also designed the font.	II
All Saints Church	Rome, Italy; 41.9085°N 12.4790°E		1882	New church, completed posthumously.	
American Cathedral in Paris	Paris, France; 48.8671°N 2.3004°E		1881-1886	New church, completed posthumously.	

== See also ==
- List of church restorations and alterations by G. E. Street
- List of domestic buildings by G. E. Street
- List of miscellaneous works by G. E. Street

== Notes ==
^{A} There is disagreement about the attribution to G. E. Street; the architect may have been the unrelated W. C. Street.
