= List of domestic buildings by G. E. Street =

G. E. Street (1824–81) was an English architect and architectural writer, whose designs were mainly in High Victorian Gothic style. Born the son of a solicitor, he first worked in a law office, but was then articled to the architect Owen Browne Carter in Winchester. Two years later, in 1844, he moved to London and worked in the office of George Gilbert Scott. Here he also worked with George Frederick Bodley and William White. Street established his own architectural practice in 1849, initially in London, and later in Wantage (then in Berkshire). He was appointed as architect to the diocese of Oxford in 1850, and retained this position until his death. He married in 1852 and in that year moved to Oxford. He returned to London in 1856 and maintained an office there for the remainder of his career. He travelled extensively, visiting the Continent of Europe frequently. Street was also a prolific writer on architectural subjects. He was a member of the Royal Academy, and in 1874 was awarded the Royal Gold Medal of the Royal Institute of British Architects, being its president in 1881.

Most of Street's works were in relation to churches; designing new churches, restoring and making additions and alterations to existing churches, and designing fittings and furnishings for them. He also designed domestic buildings, especially vicarages, and schools with houses for the schoolmaster. He designed little in the way of public buildings, although towards the end of his life he designed what has been described as his "greatest commission", the Royal Courts of Justice in London. Most of his works were in England, especially within and close to the diocese of Oxford, but examples of his work can be found throughout England, Wales and Ireland. He also designed some buildings abroad, including a church in Constantinople. Almost all his designs are in Gothic Revival style, in particular, in what is known as the High Victorian style. This style came chronologically after the use of "pure" and "correct" use of features of English Gothic architecture, which had been championed by A. W. N. Pugin and the Ecclesiological Society. High Victorian incorporated the use of polychromy, and elements of Continental forms of Gothic architecture. Street died in 1881, and was buried in Westminster Abbey.

This list contains details of Street's work on domestic buildings in England and Scotland.

== Key ==
Grade	Criteria
Grade I	Buildings of exceptional interest, sometimes considered to be internationally important.
Grade II*	Particularly important buildings of more than special interest.
Grade II	Buildings of national importance and special interest.
"—" denotes a work that is not graded.
Category (Scotland)	Criteria
Category A	Buildings of national or international importance, either architectural or historic, or fine little-altered examples of some particular period, style or building type.
Category B	Buildings of regional or more than local importance, or major examples of some particular period, style or building type which may have been altered.
Category C(S)	Buildings of local importance, lesser examples of any period, style, or building type, as originally constructed or moderately altered; and simple traditional buildings which group well with others in categories A and B.
"—" denotes a work that is not graded.

== Works ==
Name	Location	Photograph	Date	Notes	Grade
White Lodge	Monken Hadley, Barnet, Greater London		c. 1849–50	Street made additions to a rectory built in 1824.	II
Vicarage	Sulgrave, Northamptonshire; 52.1033°N 1.1911°W		c. 1850	A house dating from the 17th or 18th century, remodelled by Street.	II
Vicarage	Wantage, Oxfordshire; 51.5889°N 1.4292°W		c. 1850	A new building for Revd William John Butler.	II
1–5 Church Street	Hatford, Oxfordshire; 51.6519°N 1.5120°W		1853	Row of six cottages, since reduced to three.	II
St Thomas' Vicarage	Colnbrook, Berkshire; 51.4853°N 0.5216°W		1853–54		II
Vicarage	Ripon College, Cuddesdon, Oxfordshire; 51.7238°N 1.1338°W		1853–54	Later part of the college.	II*
Vicarage	Kidlington, Oxfordshire; 51.8255°N 1.2804°W		1853–54	Extension of a 16th-century vicarage.	II*
Vicarage	West Challow, Oxfordshire; 51.5931°N 1.4728°W		1853–54	Later used as a house, and called Church Croft.	II
All Saints Cottage	Maidenhead, Berkshire; 51.5196°N 0.7365°W		1854–57	Adjoining the parish centre.	II*
All Saints Vicarage	Maidenhead, Berkshire; 51.5200°N 0.7363°W		1854–57		II*
Rectory	Upton Magna, Shropshire; 52.7078°N 2.6613°W		c. 1856		II
St James' Vicarage	Stantonbury, Milton Keynes, Buckinghamshire; 52.0622°N 0.7860°W		1857–59		II
Vicarage	Bloxham, Oxfordshire; 52.0184°N 1.3750°W		1858	Enlargement of a vicarage built in 1811–15.	II
School house	Colnbrook, Berkshire; 51.4844°N 0.5215°W		1858		II
Rectory	Laverstoke, Hampshire; 51.2347°N 1.3017°W		1858		II
5 Boyn Hill Road	Maidenhead, Berkshire; 51.5193°N 0.7371°W		1858	Built as almshouses.	II
The Grange	Little Tew, Oxfordshire; 51.9550°N 1.4470°W		c. 1858	A vicarage for Revd F. Garrett. Later extended by different architects.	II
North Moreton House	North Moreton, Oxfordshire; 51.6019°N 1.1901°W		c. 1858	Restoration of a former vicarage dating from the 16th century.	II
3 and 3a Boyn Hill Road	Maidenhead, Berkshire; 51.5196°N 0.7369°W		1859	Built as a clergy house.	II
5 Bachelor's Acre	Windsor, Berkshire; 51.4807°N 0.6089°W		1859		II
7 Bachelor's Acre	Windsor, Berkshire; 51.4804°N 0.6090°W		1859		II
Headmaster's house	Burton upon Trent, Staffordshire; 52.8102°N 1.6329°W		1860	A house for the headmaster of Holy Trinity School.	II
St Andrew's Vicarage	Leeds, West Yorkshire; 53.8008°N 1.5633°W		c. 1860	Since used as offices.	II
Vicarage	North Muskham, Nottinghamshire; 53.1279°N 0.8152°W		1863	Built as a vicarage for Revd Winstanley Hall; since used as a hotel.	II
Bayfield House	Lydford, Devon; 50.6427°N 4.1082°W		1870	Built as a vicarage at a cost of £5,000 (equivalent to £510,000 in 2025).	II
Frognall Grove	Frognal, Camden, Greater London; 51.5580°N 0.1820°W		1871–72	A large house inherited by Street, who made additions to it. Later subdivided into four semi-detached houses.	II*
Cotton House	Marlborough, Wiltshire; 51.4179°N 1.7433°W		1871–72	New house.	II
Littlefield	Marlborough, Wiltshire; 51.4180°N 1.7418°W		1871–72	New house involving the early use of concrete in its construction.	II
Vicarage	Wansford, East Yorkshire; 53.9950°N 0.3813°W		1872	For Sir Tatton Sykes, 5th Baronet of Sledmere.	II
Vicarage	Helperthorpe, North Yorkshire; 54.1210°N 0.5431°W		1873		II
Holmdale	Holmbury St Mary, Surrey; 51.1827°N 0.4122°W		1873	A country house built by Street for himself and his son. It has since been extended and divided.	I
Tor Ridge	Holmbury St Mary, Surrey; 51.1835°N 0.4097°W		1873	A lodge to Holmdale.	II
Vicarage	Thixendale, North Yorkshire; 54.0385°N 0.7148°W		c. 1874	For Sir Tatton Sykes, 5th Baronet of Sledmere.	II
Wigan Hall	Wigan, Greater Manchester; 53.5482°N 2.6363°W		1875–76	Built as a rectory for the Bridgeman family. The gatehouse and attached wall, and the terrace walls and steps, are all listed at Grade II.	II
Dunecht House	Dunecht estate, Aberdeenshire, Scotland; 57.1610°N 2.4134°W		1877	Additions.	A
The Grange and Orchard Hall	Melksham, Wiltshire; 51.3721°N 2.1416°W		1877	A house dating from the late 17th century remodelled by Street. Originally a vicarage, later a children's home.	II
Former priest's house	Dunster, Somerset; 51.1830°N 3.4456°W		c. 1877	Restoration of a medieval house.	II
The Gables	Carlton, South Yorkshire; 53.5862°N 1.4492°W		c. 1879	Built as the vicarage for St John's Church.	II
4 Cadogan Square	Kensington and Chelsea, Greater London; 51.4960°N 0.1605°W		c. 1880	A five-storey building, and "one of his [Street's] rare domestic buildings in London".	II*
Vicarage	Kingston, Dorset; 50.6150°N 2.0649°W		c. 1880	With a stable and coach house. Later known as Kingston House.	II
Old Rectory	Blymhill, Staffordshire; 52.7072°N 2.2840°W		Undated	Street added a wing to the rectory, which has since been demolished.	II
Vicarage	Christ Church, Lambeth, Greater London; 51.4725°N 0.1322°W		Undated		II

== See also ==
- List of new churches by G. E. Street
- List of church restorations and alterations by G. E. Street
- List of miscellaneous works by G. E. Street
