= Listed buildings in Heswall =

Heswall is a town in Wirral, Merseyside, England. It contains nine buildings that are recorded in the National Heritage List for England as designated listed buildings. Of these, one is listed at Grade II*, the middle of the three grades, and the others are at Grade II, the lowest grade. The list includes those in the adjacent villages of Barnston, Thingwall and Pensby. The listed buildings consist of two churches, houses, a bank, a sundial, and a war memorial.

== Key ==
Grade	Criteria
II*	Particularly important buildings of more than special interest
II	Buildings of national importance and special interest

== Buildings ==
Name and location	Photograph	Date	Notes	Grade
St Peter's Church; 53.32277°N 3.10362°W		14th century	The oldest part of the church is the lower part of the tower, the upper part being added in the late 15th century. The body of the church was rebuilt in 1739, and rebuilt again by J. P. Doyle in 1879 following damage by lightning. The church is built in sandstone with a slate roof, and consists of a nave with a clerestory, aisles, a chancel with a north vestry and a south chapel, and a southwest tower. The tower has buttresses, a stair turret, a cornice, and an embattled parapet.	II*
Oldfield Farmhouse; 53.33712°N 3.12004°W		1604	A farmhouse, later divided into two houses, in stone with a slate roof. It has two storeys and an attic, and a front of six bays, the first and second bays projecting forward. The windows are mullioned, some containing sashes and others casements. There are also gabled roof dormers.	II
The Cottage, Thingwall; 53.35297°N 3.09767°W		17th century (probable)	A roughcast house with a slate roof. Most windows are mullioned, and there is a casement window and a horizontally-sliding sash window. A blocked window is inscribed with initials and the 1786. There are two entrances on the front.	II
Benty Heath Farmhouse, Thingwall; 53.35242°N 3.09720°W		18th century	Farmhouse with datestone reading 'RWK/1732'. Stone with slate roof and brick stacks. 2 storeys, 3 bays, the 1st bay later. Windows have horizontally sliding sashes. C20 porch has single light to left. Cross axial and gable-end stacks.	II
Pensby Hall; 53.33913°N 3.10381°W		1688	A house that was later extended, it is in stone with a slate roof. The house has a six-bay front and, other than a single story end bay, is in two storeys with an attic. At the rear is a projecting garage and stable. The windows are a mix of casements and sashes, some of which are mullioned.	II
Sundial; 53.32262°N 3.10396°W		1726	The sundial is in the churchyard of St Peter's Church. It consists of a stone baluster on two circular steps with an octagonal plate and a gnomon.	II
Beech Farmhouse, Barnston; 53.34223°N 3.08314°W		Late 18th century	A brick farmhouse, partly stuccoed, with a Welsh slate roof. The main block has three storeys and two bays, there is a two-storey two-bay wing to the left, and a single-storey one-bay extension beyond that. The windows are sashes, apart from a 20th-century casement window in the extension.	II
Christ Church, Barnston; 53.34087°N 3.08211°W		1870–71	A church designed by G. E. Street in stone with a tiled roof. It consists of a nave, a chancel, and two vestries. At the west end is an octagonal bellcote.	II
Lloyd's Bank; 53.32832°N 3.09893°W		1907	The bank was designed by George Hastwell Grayson, and is in stone and brick, with some timber-framing at the rear, and with Cumbrian slate roofs. It stands on a corner site, has an L-shaped plan, and is in two storeys. The banking hall faces Telegraph Road, it has three bays and three gables. On the corner is a canted entrance turret that has a pyramidal roof and a lead finial. Along The Mount is the manager's house. The windows are mullioned.	II
War memorial 53.32527°N 3.10017°W		1924	The war memorial stands in a walled garden, and is in red sandstone. It consists of a three-stepped square base on which is a square plinth, and a short tapering square column with a pedimented capital. This is surmounted by a plain Celtic cross. On the front of the column is a carved wreath. The sides of the plinth contain panels with inscriptions and the names of those who died in the First World War. Within the garden are two stones with plaques inscribed with those lost in the Second World War.	II
