= Christ Church, Barnston =

Coordinates: 53.3409°N 3.0821°W

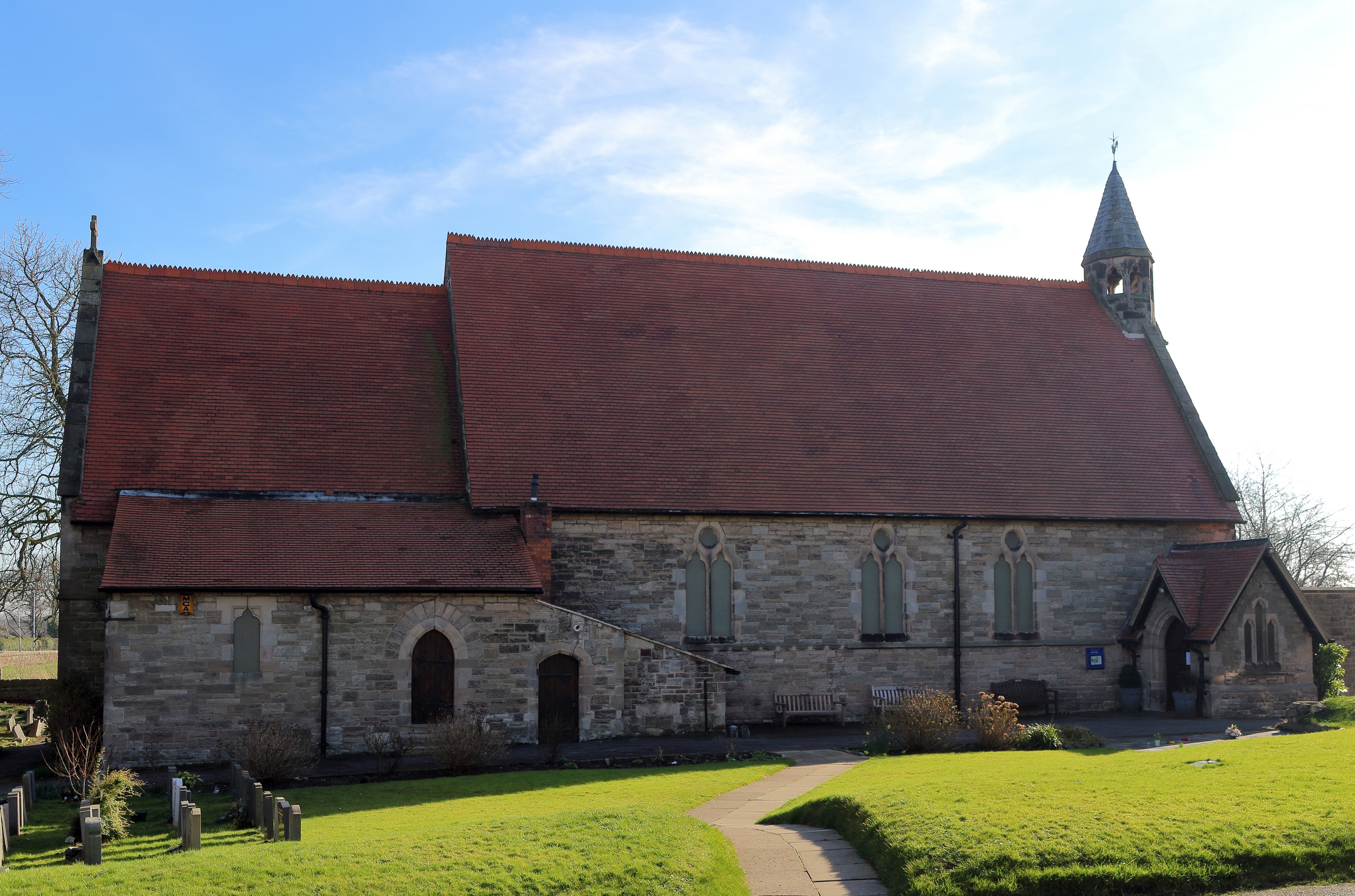
- Christ Church, Barnston, from the north

- Location in Merseyside
- OS grid reference: SJ 281 832
- Location: Barnston, Wirral, Merseyside
- Country: England
- Denomination: Anglican
- Churchmanship: Conservative Evangelical
- Website: Christ Church, Barnston

History
- Status: Parish church

Architecture
- Functional status: Active
- Heritage designation: Grade II
- Designated: 2 December 1986
- Architect: G. E. Street
- Architectural type: Church
- Style: Gothic Revival
- Groundbreaking: 1870
- Completed: 1871

Specifications
- Materials: Stone, tiled roof

Administration
- Province: York
- Diocese: Chester
- Archdeaconry: Chester
- Deanery: Wirral, North
- Parish: Barnston

Clergy
- Vicar: Revd Peter Froggatt

Christ Church is in the village of Barnston, near Heswall, Wirral, Merseyside, England. The church was built in 1870–71, and designed by G. E. Street. It is an active Anglican parish church in the diocese of Chester. The church is recorded in the National Heritage List for England as a designated Grade II listed building.

== History ==
The church was built in 1870–71, and was designed by G. E. Street. A west vestry was added later.

== Architecture ==
Christ Church is constructed in rock-faced stone with ashlar dressings, and has a tiled roof. Its plan consists of a nave, a chancel, a northwest porch, and north and west vestries. At the west end there are buttresses that rise to terminate in an octagonal bell-turret. The windows are cusped lancets, those in the nave have varying designs. The east window has three lights and contains Geometrical tracery. Inside the church is a 20th-century octagonal font, a pulpit with traceried panels, and a timber screen on a stone base with a trefoil frieze and Tudor roses. The choir stalls have large fleur-de-lys poppyheads. The stained glass includes windows by Powells and by Clayton and Bell.

== Appraisal ==
The church was designated as a Grade II listed building on 2 December 1986. Grade II is the lowest of the three grades of listing and is applied to buildings that are "nationally important and of special interest".

== Present day ==
Christ Church is an active Anglican parish church in the deanery of Wirral, North, the archdeaconry of Chester, and the diocese of Chester. Its benefice is combined with that of St Michael and All Angels, Pensby. Its style of worship is Conservative Evangelical, and its patron is the Bishop of Chester.

== See also ==
- Listed buildings in Heswall
