= List of church restorations and alterations by G. E. Street =

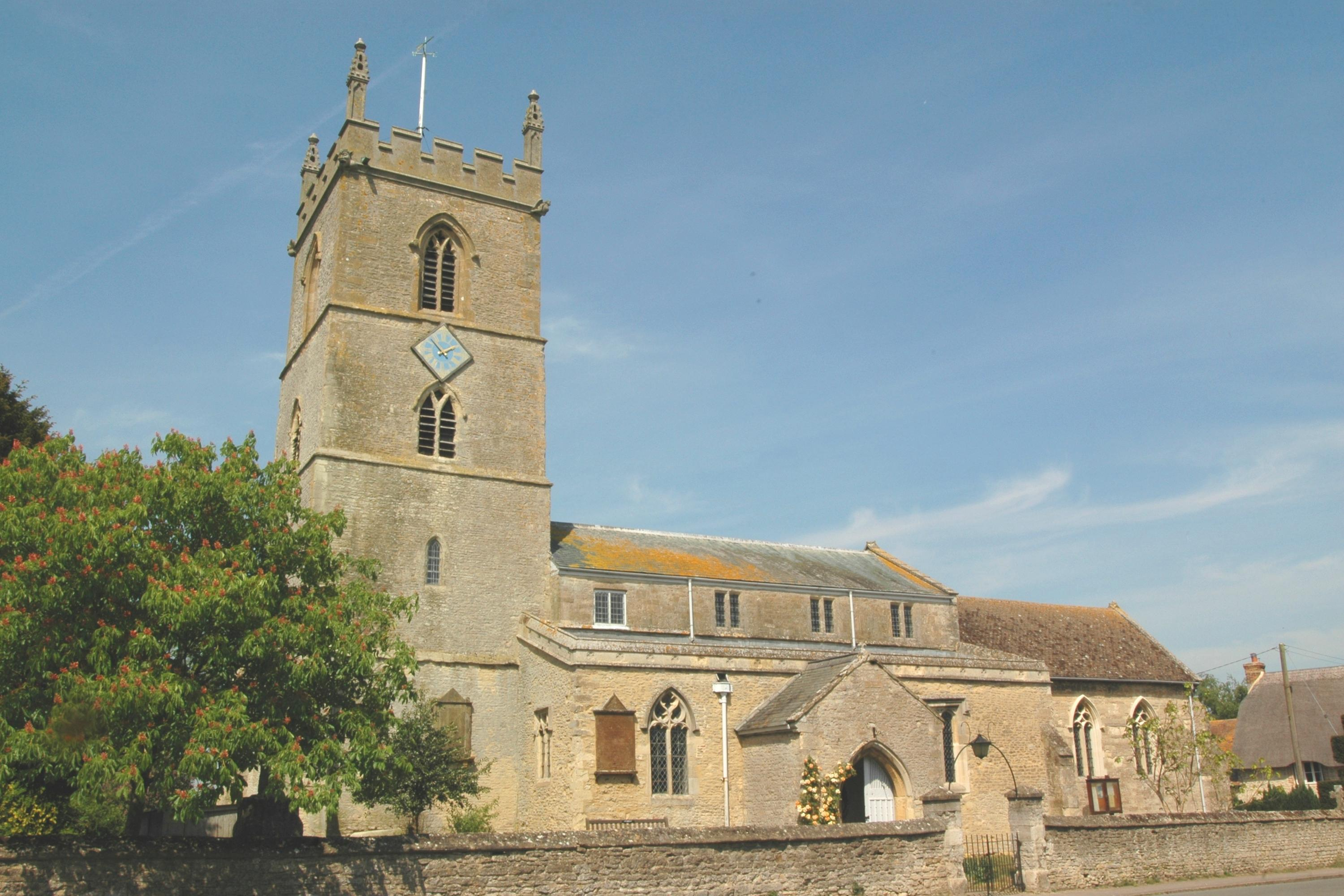
St Mary's Church, Charlton-on-Otmoor, a church restored by Street in 1857

G. E. Street (1824–81) was an English architect and architectural writer, whose designs were mainly in High Victorian Gothic style. Born the son of a solicitor, he first worked in a law office, but was then articled to the architect Owen Carter in Winchester. Two years later, in 1844, he moved to London and worked in the office of George Gilbert Scott. Here he also worked with George Frederick Bodley and William White. Street established his own architectural practice in 1849, initially in London, and later in Wantage (then in Berkshire). He was appointed as architect to the diocese of Oxford in 1850, and retained this position until his death. He married in 1852 and in that year moved to Oxford. He returned to London in 1856 and maintained an office there for the remainder of his career. He travelled extensively, visiting the Continent of Europe frequently. Street was also a prolific writer on architectural subjects. He was a member of the Royal Academy, and in 1874 was awarded the Royal Gold Medal of the Royal Institute of British Architects, being its president in 1881.

Most of Street's works were in relation to churches; designing new churches, restoring and making additions and alterations to existing churches, and designing fittings and furnishings for them. He also designed domestic buildings, especially vicarages, and schools with houses for the schoolmaster. He designed little in the way of public buildings, although towards the end of his life he designed what has been described as his "greatest commission", the Royal Courts of Justice in London. Most of his works were in England, especially within and close to the diocese of Oxford, where he built or restored 113 churches, but examples of his work can be found throughout England, Wales and Ireland. He also designed some buildings abroad, including a church in Constantinople. Almost all his designs are in Gothic Revival style, in particular, in what is known as the High Victorian style. This style came chronologically after the use of "pure" and "correct" use of features of English Gothic architecture, which had been championed by A. W. N. Pugin and the Ecclesiological Society. High Victorian incorporated the use of polychromy, and elements of Continental forms of Gothic architecture. He stated that the main aim of his restorations was to create churches that encouraged "the hearty, loyal and reverent setting forth of the Prayer Book" rather than to preserve historic forms or to adopt architecturally correct designs. Street died in 1881, and was buried in Westminster Abbey.

This list contains details of the restorations and alterations of churches in England, Scotland and Wales. He also worked on churches in Ireland, including restoration and rebuilding at Christ Church Cathedral in Dublin between 1871 and 1878, and the restoration of Kildare Cathedral from 1875.

== Key ==
Grade	Criteria
Grade I	Buildings of exceptional interest, sometimes considered to be internationally important.
Grade II*	Particularly important buildings of more than special interest.
Grade II	Buildings of national importance and special interest.
"—" denotes a work that is not graded.
Category (Scotland)	Criteria
Category A	Buildings of national or international importance, either architectural or historic, or fine little-altered examples of some particular period, style or building type.
Category B	Buildings of regional or more than local importance, or major examples of some particular period, style or building type which may have been altered.
Category C(S)	Buildings of local importance, lesser examples of any period, style, or building type, as originally constructed or moderately altered; and simple traditional buildings which group well with others in categories A and B.
"—" denotes a work that is not graded.

== Works ==
Name	Location	Photograph	Date	Notes	Grade
St Cubert's Church	Cubert, Cornwall; 50.3779°N 5.1152°W		1846–49	Restoration of a church dating from the 13th century.	I
St Mary the Virgin's Church	Monken Hadley, Barnet, Greater London; 51.6616°N 0.1939°W		c. 1848–50	Restoration of a church dating from the 15th century.	II*
St Peter's Church	Stonehouse, Plymouth, Devon; 50.3732°N 4.1544°W		1849–50	Added the chancel.	II
St Probus' Church	Probus, Cornwall; 50.2920°N 4.9510°W		1850	Restoration of a church dating from the 15th century.	I
St Andrew's Church	Chaddleworth, Berkshire; 51.4988°N 1.4086°W		1851	Added the chancel.	I
St Mewan's Church	St Mewan, Cornwall; 50.3325°N 4.8138°W		c. 1851	Restoration of a church dating from the 12th century.	II*
St Giles' Church	Barrow, Shropshire; 52.5965°N 2.5065°W		1851–52	Restoration of a church dating from the 8th (or 11th) century.	I
All Saints Church	Cuddesdon, Oxfordshire; 51.7230°N 1.1317°W		1851–53	Restoration of a church dating from the 12th century.	I
St Andrew's Church	Rollright, Oxfordshire; 51.9810°N 1.5255°W		1852	Restoration of a church dating from the 12th century.	I
St Mary's Church	Lichfield, Staffordshire; 52.6835°N 1.8274°W		1852–54	Street added the steeple to the tower. The rest of the church was rebuilt in 1868–70 by James Fowler. In 1979–81 the church was adapted to form a heritage centre.	II*
St John the Baptist's Church	Shottesbrooke, Berkshire; 51.4867°N 0.7895°W		1852–54	Restoration of a church dating from the 14th century.	I
St Nicholas' Church	Abbots Bromley, Staffordshire; 52.8185°N 1.8837°W		1852–55	Restoration and partial rebuilding of a church dating from about 1300.	II*
St Peter's Church	Chalfont St Peter, Buckinghamshire; 51.6078°N 0.5567°W		1853–54	Altered and extended. Street's first use of polychromatic brick.	II*
St Michael's Church	Oxford; 51.7537°N 1.2584°W		1854	Restoration of a church dating from the 11th century.	I
St Lucia's Church	Upton Magna, Shropshire; 52.7081°N 2.6625°W		1854	Restoration with some partial rebuilding of a church dating from the Norman era.	II*
St Mary's Church	Salford, Oxfordshire; 51.9504°N 1.5847°W		1854–55	A church dating from the 12th century that was largely rebuilt.	II
St Mary the Virgin's Church	Upton Scudamore, Wiltshire; 51.2281°N 2.1951°W		1855	Restoration of a church dating from the 12th century.	II*
St Edmund's Church	Shipston on Stour, Warwickshire; 52.0635°N 1.6232°W		1855	Other than the 15th-century tower, the church was rebuilt in 14th-century style.	II*
St Peter's Church	Bournemouth, Dorset; 50.7205°N 1.8756°W		1855–79	The south aisle was built in 1851, and the rest of the church was designed by Street.	I
St Mary's Church	Charlbury, Oxfordshire; 51.8723°N 1.4849°W		1856	Restoration of a church dating from the 12th century.	I
St Andrew's Church	Collingbourne Ducis, Wiltshire; 51.2817°N 1.6541°W		1856	Restoration of a church dating from the 12th century.	II*
St Kenelm's Church	Enstone, Oxfordshire; 51.9233°N 1.4493°W		1856	Restoration of a church dating from the 12th century.	II*
St Martin's Church	Sandford St. Martin, Oxfordshire; 51.9372°N 1.3901°W		1856	Restoration of a church dating from the 13th century.	II*
St Michael's Church	Tilehurst, Reading, Berkshire; 51.4514°N 1.0320°W		1856	Built by Street, other than the 14th-century south aisle, and the 1737 tower.	II
St Edward the Confessor's Church	Westcott Barton, Oxfordshire; 51.9280°N 1.3747°W		1856	Restoration of a church dating from the 12th century.	II*
St Mary's Chapel	Arley Hall, Arley, Cheshire; 53.3246°N 2.4886°W		1856–57	Added the north aisle.	II*
St Michael's Church	Garton on the Wolds, East Yorkshire; 54.0206°N 0.5027°W		1856–57	With John Loughborough Pearson, restoration and internal decoration of a church dating from the 12th century for Sir Tatton Sykes, 5th Baronet of Sledmere.	I
St Michael's Church	Finmere, Oxfordshire; 51.9930°N 1.0743°W		1856–58	Restoration of a church dating from the 14th century.	II
St Mary's Church	Blymhill, Staffordshire; 52.7074°N 2.2849°W		1856–59	Other than the west tower and the chancel, much of the rest of the church is by Street. He also designed the school, and partly designed the rectory.	I
St Mary's Church	Addington, Buckinghamshire; 51.9500°N 0.9209°W		1857	Restoration and rebuilding of a church dating from the 14th century.	II*
Holy Trinity Church	Ascott-under-Wychwood, Oxfordshire; 51.8657°N 1.5649°W		1857	Restoration of a church dating from the 14th century.	II*
St Mary the Virgin's Church	Charlton-on-Otmoor, Oxfordshire; 51.8382°N 1.1859°W		1857	Restoration of a church dating from the 13th century.	I
St Michael and All Angel's Church	Fringford, Oxfordshire; 51.9574°N 1.1190°W		1857	South aisle rebuilt.	II
St Michael's Church	Gussage St Michael, Dorset; 50.9015°N 2.0215°W		1857	Restoration of a church dating from the 12th century.	I
St Peter and St Paul's Church	Wantage, Oxfordshire; 51.5887°N 1.4285°W		1857	Restoration of a church dating from the 13th century.	I
St Leonard's Church	Waterstock, Oxfordshire; 51.7453°N 1.0808°W		1857	Restoration of a church dating from the 15th century.	II*
St Mary's Church	Hanley Castle, Worcestershire; 52.0756°N 2.2367°W		1858	Restoration of a church dating from the 14th century.	II*
St Leonard's Church	Pitcombe, Somerset; 51.0928°N 2.4687°W		1858	Church rebuilt, other than the 15th-century tower.	II
St Mary the Virgin's Church	Kempsford. Gloucestershire; 51.6670°N 1.7681°W		c. 1858	Restoration of a church dating from the 12th century.	I
All Saints Church	North Moreton, Oxfordshire; 51.6022°N 1.1898°W		c. 1858	Restoration of a church dating from the 13th century and addition of the south porch.	I
St John the Baptist's Church	Hagley, Worcestershire; 52.4248°N 2.1180°W		1858–65	Partial rebuilding and remodelling of a church dating from the 13th century.	II*
St Peter and St Paul's Church	Deddington, Oxfordshire; 51.9818°N 1.3208°W		1858–68	Restoration of a church dating from the 13th century.	II*
St Peter's Church	Derby; 52.9203°N 1.4762°W		1859	Restoration of a church dating from the 12th century.	II*
St Thomas a Beckett's Church	Elsfield, Oxfordshire; 51.7859°N 1.2178°W		1859	Restoration of a church dating from the 12th century.	II*
St Mary the Virgin's Church	Headley, Surrey; 51.2801°N 0.2736°W		1859	Street added a tower to the 1855 church designed by Anthony Salvin.	II
St Edmund and St George's Church	Hethe, Oxfordshire; 51.9605°N 1.1384°W		1859	Restoration of a church dating from the 12th century.	II
St Lawrence's Church	Milcombe, Oxfordshire; 52.0083°N 1.4036°W		1859	Restoration of a church dating from the 13th century.	II
St Mary's Church	Shipton-under-Wychwood, Oxfordshire; 51.8597°N 1.5953°W		1859	Restoration of a church dating from the 13th century, with virtual rebuilding of the chancel.	I
St Michael's Church	St Michael Penkevil, Cornwall; 50.2405°N 5.0055°W		1859	Mainly rebuilt incorporating some earlier material.	I
St Leonard's Church	Drayton St. Leonard, Oxfordshire; 51.6640°N 1.1387°W		c. 1859	Restoration of a church dating from the 12th century and partial rebuilding.	II
St Mary's Church	Stone, Kent; 51.4503°N 0.2673°E		c. 1859–60	Restoration of a church dating from the 13th century.	I
St Leonard's Church	Blithfield, Staffordshire; 52.8134°N 1.9359°W		1860	Street added the south porch.	I
Holy Trinity Church	Sunningdale, Berkshire; 51.3989°N 0.6305°W		1860	Street rebuilt the chancel and added the south chapel to a church originating in 1839.	II
St Mary the Virgin's Church	Hanbury, Worcestershire; 52.2777°N 2.0685°W		c. 1860	Restoration of a church dating from the 13th century.	I
St John's Church	Barford St. John, Oxfordshire; 51.9955°N 1.3622°W		1860s	Restoration of a church dating from the 12th century.	II*
St Peter and St Paul's Church	Wymering, Portsmouth, Hampshire; 50.8458°N 1.0777°W		1860–61	Restoration, rebuilding and additions to a medieval church.	II*
All Saints' Church	Banstead, Surrey; 51.3220°N 0.2007°W		1861	Restoration of a church dating from the late 12th and early 13th century.	II*
St John the Baptist's Church	Pewsey, Wiltshire; 51.3379°N 1.7664°W		1861	Added the south chapel and designed the chancel fittings.	I
St Andrew's Church	Wootton Rivers, Wiltshire; 51.3653°N 1.7188°W		1861	Restoration of a church dating from the 14th century.	II*
St John the Baptist's Church	Garboldisham, Norfolk; 52.3960°N 0.9444°E		1862	Restoration of a church dating from the 13th century, and reconstruction of the chancel.	I
St Eloy's Church	Great Smeaton, North Yorkshire; 54.4343°N 1.4647°W		1862	A church dating from the 13th century, largely rebuilt.	II
St Michael's Church	Stewkley, Buckinghamshire; 51.9269°N 0.7622°W		1862	Restoration of a church dating from the 12th century.	I
St Mary the Virgin's Church	Wiggenhall St Mary the Virgin, Norfolk; 52.7042°N 0.3409°E		1862	Restoration of a church dating from the 15th century.	I
St James' Church	Cowley, Oxfordshire; 51.7305°N 1.2198°W		1862–65	Work carried out on a church originating in the 12th century.	II*
St Ebbe's Church	Oxford; 51.7506°N 1.2597°W		1862–66	Added a south aisle.	II*
St Andrew's Church	Isleham, Cambridgeshire; 52.3432°N 0.4115°E		1863	Rebuilt the west tower.	I
St Mary's Church	Longfleet, Poole, Dorset; 50.7227°N 1.9717°W		1863	Added the chancel to a church of 1830–33 by Edward Blore. Steeple added 1883 by G. R. Crickmay and Son.	II
St Bartholomew's Church	Otford, Kent; 51.3123°N 0.1917°E		1863	Restoration and rebuilding of the south arcade in a church dating from the 11th century.	I
All Saints Church	Soulbury, Buckinghamshire; 51.9348°N 0.7183°W		1863	Restoration of a church dating from the 14th century.	II*
St Mary's Church	Turweston, Buckinghamshire; 52.0348°N 1.1263°W		1863	Restoration and the addition of a saddleback roof to the tower.	II*
St Botolph's Church	Bradenham, Buckinghamshire; 51.6668°N 0.8038°W		1863–65	Chancel rebuilt.	II*
St Mary's Church	Bloxham, Oxfordshire; 52.0179°N 1.3747°W		1864	Restoration of a church dating from the 12th century.	I
St Ladoca's Church	Ladock, Cornwall; 50.3211°N 4.9590°W		1864	Restoration of a church dating from the 15th century.	I
St Mary's Church	North Leigh, Oxfordshire; 51.8202°N 1.4395°W		1864	Restoration of a church dating from the 11th century.	I
St Mary's Church	Prestbury, Gloucestershire; 51.9144°N 2.0451°W		1864–68	Restoration of a church dating from the 13th century.	II*
St Olave's Church	Fritwell, Oxfordshire; 51.9597°N 1.2380°W		1865	Restoration and partial rebuilding of a church dating from the 12th century.	II*
St Michael's Church	High Ercall, Shropshire; 52.7522°N 2.6021°W		1865	Restoration of a church dating from the late 12th century, with the addition of a south porch and vestry.	I
St Michael's Church	Shepton Beauchamp, Somerset; 50.9508°N 2.8513°W		1865	Restoration of a church dating from the 13th century.	I
St Mary's Church	Walsgrave, West Midlands; 52.4246°N 1.4440°W		1865	Restoration of a church dating from the about 1300.	II*
St James' Church	Aston Abbotts, Buckinghamshire; 51.8743°N 0.7705°W		1865–66	Rebuilding of the church, other than the tower.	II*
St Swithin's Church	Headbourne Worthy, Hampshire; 51.0852°N 1.3055°W		c. 1865–66	Restoration of a church dating from the 11th century.	I
All Saints' Church	Gresford, Wrexham, Wales; 53.0880°N 2.9773°W		1865–67	Restoration, including a new pulpit.	I
St Mary the Virgin's Church	Witney, Oxfordshire; 51.7808°N 1.4850°W		1865–69	Restoration of a church dating from the late 12th century. Street also designed the piscina, sedilia, pulpit, lectern, pews, and font.	I
St Mary's Church	Luton, Bedfordshire; 51.8787°N 0.4102°W		1865–85	Restoration of a church dating from the 14th century.	I
All Saints Church	Low Catton, East Yorkshire; 53.9772°N 0.9269°W		1866	Added the chancel.	I
St Mary's Church	Tutbury, Staffordshire; 52.8590°N 1.6878°W		1866	Replacement of the chancel and apsidal sanctuary. The reredos, pulpit, stalls and font were also designed by Street.	I
St Benedict Biscop's Church	Wombourne, Staffordshire; 52.5363°N 2.1832°W		1866–67	Other than the tower and the north aisle, the church is by Street.	II
Royal Garrison Church	Portsmouth, Hampshire; 50.7890°N 1.1039°W		1866–68	Restoration of a church dating from the 13th century. Damaged by an incendiary bomb in 1941.	II
Holy Trinity Church	Eccleshall, Staffordshire; 52.8598°N 2.2577°W		1866–69	Restoration of a church dating from the 13th century.	I
St Mary's Church	Hayling Island, Hampshire; 50.7955°N 0.9769°W		1866–69	Restoration and re-seating of the nave of this mid-13th-century church.	II*
St Barnabas' Church	Peasemore, Berkshire; 51.4908°N 1.3417°W		c.1866	Street rebuilt (or added) the chancel.	II
St Helen's Church	West Keal, Lincolnshire; 53.1534°N 0.0435°E		1867	Chancel by Street.	II*
St Edward the Confessor's Church	Leek, Staffordshire; 53.1068°N 2.0266°W		1867	Restoration of a church dating from the 13th century, and rebuilding of the chancel.	II*
St Lawrence's Church	Weston under Penyard, Herefordshire; 51.9064°N 2.5373°W		1867	Restoration of a church dating from the 14th century.	II*
All Saints Church	Wotton Underwood, Buckinghamshire; 51.8379°N 1.0024°W		1867	Chancel rebuilt for the Duke of Buckingham.	II*
St Andrew's Church	Freckenham, Suffolk; 52.3187°N 0.4429°E		1867–69	Alterations.	II*
St Paul's Church	Bedford; 52.1354°N 0.4675°W		1868	Rebuilding of the steeple.	I
St Britius' Church	Brize Norton, Oxfordshire; 51.7663°N 1.5668°W		1868	Restoration and partial rebuilding of a church dating from the 12th century.	II*
St George's Church	Hampnett, Gloucestershire; 51.8398°N 1.8557°W		1868	Restoration and partial rebuilding of a church dating from the 12th century.	I
St Mary's Church	High Halden, Kent; 51.1029°N 0.7149°E		1868	Restoration of a church dating from the Norman era.	I
St Nicholas' Church	Lillingstone Dayrell, Buckinghamshire; 52.0523°N 0.9729°W		1868	Restoration of a church dating from the Norman era.	I
St Lawrence's Church	Long Eaton, Derbyshire; 52.8988°N 1.2707°W		1868	Rebuilding, using the former nave and chancel as a new south aisle and chapel, and adding a new nave, south aisle, chancel and vestry.	II*
All Saints Church	Middleton Stoney, Oxfordshire; 51.9053°N 1.2295°W		1868	Restoration and partial rebuilding of a church dating from the 12th century.	II*
St Genwys' Church	Scotton, Lincolnshire; 53.4811°N 0.6598°W		1868	Restoration of a church dating from the 12th century.	I
St Nicholas' Church	Tackley, Oxfordshire; 51.8781°N 1.3102°W		1868	Restoration and addition of a porch to a church dating from the 11th century.	II*
St Margaret of Antioch's Church	Yatton Keynell, Wiltshire; 51.4861°N 2.1941°W		1868	Restoration of a church dating from the 13th century.	I
St Lawrence's Church	Eyam, Derbyshire; 53.2843°N 1.6748°W		1868–69	Restoration of the north aisle and chancel in a church dating from the 12th century.	II*
St James' Church	Staple, Kent; 51.2637°N 1.2515°E		1868–69	Restoration of a church dating from the 12th century.	I
St Augustine's Church	Hedon, East Yorkshire; 53.7415°N 0.1997°W		1868–76	Restoration of a church dating from the 13th century.	I
Bristol Cathedral	Bristol; 51.4517°N 2.6007°W		1868–77	Designed the nave and west towers.	I
St John the Baptist's Church	Chipping Sodbury, Gloucestershire; 51.5390°N 2.3943°W		1869	Restoration of a church dating from the 13th century.	I
College chapel	Jesus College, Oxford; 51.7536°N 1.2566°W		1869	Restoration.	I
St Editha's Church	Polesworth, Warwickshire; 52.6190°N 1.6126°W		1869	Restoration of a church dating from the 12th century.	II*
St Peter and St Paul's Church	Shiplake, Oxfordshire; 51.4980°N 0.8959°W		1869	Restoration of a church dating from the 13th century.	II*
St Mary's Church	Wendover, Buckinghamshire; 51.7579°N 0.7390°W		1869	Restoration of a church dating from the 14th century.	II*
St James' Church	Acton Trussell, Staffordshire; 52.7547°N 2.0943°W		1869–70	Restoration of a church dating from about 1300.	II*
Christ Church	Chorleywood, Hertfordshire; 51.6584°N 0.5037°W		1869–70	Street rebuilt the body of the church, adding it to a tower of 1845. In 1880–82 the tower was buttressed and the spire added using Street's design.	II*
St Peter's Church	Elford, Staffordshire; 52.6928°N 1.7275°W		1869–70	The south aisle and south chapel were added to a medieval church.	II*
All Saints Church	Hilgay, Norfolk; 52.5566°N 0.3918°E		1869–70	The nave and chancel are by Street; the tower dates from 1794 and the south aisle from the 14th century.	II*
St Andrew's Church	Weston-under-Lizard, Staffordshire; 52.6932°N 2.2883°W		1869–70	Restoration of a church dating from 1700–01.	I
St Bartholomew and All Saints Church	Wootton Bassett, Wiltshire; 51.5415°N 1.9060°W		1869–71	Restoration of a church dating from the 14th century.	II*
St. George's Church	Bloomsbury, Camden, Greater London; 51.5177°N 0.1247°W		1870	Restoration of a church dating from 1716–31 designed by Nicholas Hawksmoor.	I
St Cynfraen's Church	Llysfaen, Conwy, Wales; 53.2828°N 3.6615°W		1870	Restoration, including a full set of furnishings.	II*
St Andrew's Church	South Warnborough, Hampshire; 51.2194°N 0.9682°W		1870	Addition of a south aisle.	II*
All Saints Church	Thrumpton, Nottinghamshire; 52.8759°N 1.2440°W		1870	Restoration of a church dating from the 14th century.	II*
St Peter's Church	East Lavington, West Sussex; 50.9381°N 0.6547°W		c. 1870	Restoration of a church dating from the 13th century.	II*
All Saints Church	Kirby Underdale, East Yorkshire; 54.0170°N 0.7677°W		1870–71	Added the chancel and south porch.	I
St John the Baptist's Church	Burford, Oxfordshire; 51.8097°N 1.6343°W		1870s	Restoration of a church dating from the 12th century, or earlier.	I
St Nicholas' Church	Winterborne Kingston, Dorset; 50.7778°N 2.1968°W		1870s	Restoration of a church dating from the 14th century.	II*
St Margaret's Church	Downham, Essex; 51.6295°N 0.4983°E		1871	Nave and chancel rebuilt. The church was damaged by fire in 1977, and of Street's interior, only the reredos has survived.	II
St Mary's Church	Ivinghoe, Buckinghamshire; 51.8362°N 0.6291°W		1871	Restoration and expansion of a church dating from the 13th century.	I
St Mary's Church	Sheviock, Cornwall; 50.3731°N 4.2933°W		1871	Restoration and expansion of a church dating from the 13th century.	I
All Saints Church	Thrumpton, Nottinghamshire; 52.8755°N 1.2441°W		1871	Restoration of a church dating from the 13th century.	II*
York Minster	York, North Yorkshire; 53.9622°N 1.0821°W		1871	Restoration of south transept.	I
All Saints Church	Brantingham, East Yorkshire; 53.7586°N 0.5700°W		1872	A church originating the 12th century, largely rebuilt using old materials.	II*
St Peter's Church	Britford, Wiltshire; 51.0552°N 1.7690°W		1872	Restoration of a church dating from the 9th century.	I
St Mary's Church	Glympton, Oxfordshire; 51.8937°N 1.3853°W		1872	Rebuilding of the chancel, and addition of a porch and vestry.	II
All Saints Church	Kirkby Overblow, North Yorkshire; 53.9381°N 1.5069°W		1872	Restoration of a church dating from the 14th century.	II
St Mary's Church	Leckhampstead, Buckinghamshire; 52.0349°N 0.9425°W		1872	Restoration of a church dating from the Norman era.	I
St Michael and All Angels Church	Warfield, Berkshire; 51.4420°N 0.7352°W		1872	Restoration of a church dating from the 14th century.	II*
St Andrew's Church	Weaverthorpe, North Yorkshire; 54.1267°N 0.5222°W		1872	Restoration of a church dating from the 12th century for Sir Tatton Sykes, 5th Baronet of Sledmere. The lychgate, churchyard walls, and footgate were also designed by Street, and are listed at Grade II.	I
St Mary's Church	Yatton, Somerset; 51.3849°N 2.8187°W		1872	Restoration of a church dating from the 13th century.	I
St Oswald's Church	Oswestry, Shropshire; 52.8571°N 3.0578°W		1872–74	Restoration and extension of a medieval church that had been reconstructed after extensive damage in the Civil War.	II*
St Andrew's Church	Farlington, Hampshire; 50.8478°N 1.0272°W		1872–75	Street's parents had married in 1815 at this rural church which later became part of the Portsmouth conurbation. Street's restoration, for which the design was carried out in 1858, created a "delightful small Victorian village church ... rich in detail".	II
All Saints Church	Hutton, Brentwood, Essex; 51.6241°N 0.3609°E		1873	A church dating from the 14th century, largely rebuilt by Street.	II*
Church of St James the Less	Huish, Devon; 50.8806°N 4.0857°W		1873	Other than the tower, rebuilt by Street.	II*
St Mary's Church	Bathwick, Bath, Somerset; 51.3843°N 2.3509°W		c. 1873	Addition of the chancel.	II*
St Mary's Church	Beachampton, Buckinghamshire; 52.0267°N 0.8784°W		1873–74	Restoration of a 14th century church.	II*
All Saints Church	Wycombe, Buckinghamshire; 51.6299°N 0.7509°W		1873–75	Restoration of a 13th century church.	I
St Mary's Church	Marlborough, Wiltshire; 51.4219°N 1.7294°W		1874	Added the chancel.	I
Church of St Asaph and St Kentigern	Llanasa, Flintshire, Wales; 53.3222°N 3.3429°W		1874–77	Restoration.	II*
St Mary's Church	Chartham, Kent; 51.2559°N 1.0181°E		1875	Restoration of a church dating from the 13th century.	I
St Giles' Church	Graffham, West Sussex; 50.9428°N 0.6795°W		1875	Church largely rebuilt in memory of Bishop Samuel Wilberforce, whose brother-in-law Revd Henry Edward Manning was at the time rector of the parish. The tower was added later.	II
St John the Baptist's Church	Bere Regis, Dorset; 50.7522°N 2.2177°W		c.1875	Restoration of a church dating from the 12th century.	I
Priory Church of St George	Dunster, Somerset; 51.1832°N 3.4459°W		1875–77	Restoration of a church dating mainly from the 15th century.	I
St Mary's Church	Henbury, Bristol; 51.5063°N 2.6306°W		1875–77	Restoration of a church dating from about 1200.	II*
St Mary's Church	Bolton Abbey, North Yorkshire; 53.9838°N 1.8887°W		1875–80	Restoration of the church that had been created in the nave of the former priory.	I
St Michael's Church	Hinton, Hampshire; 50.7624°N 1.7003°W		1875–83	Church rebuilt, other than the 18th-century tower.	II
St Andrew's Church	Blickling, Norfolk; 52.8096°N 1.2312°E		1876	West tower by Street.	II*
St Andrew's Church	Milborne St Andrew, Dorset; 50.7758°N 2.2833°W		c. 1876	Addition of a chancel, vestry, south aisle and chapel to a church originating in the 12th century.	II*
Church of the Holy Cross	Bignor, West Sussex; 50.9232°N 0.6036°W		1876–78	Restoration of a church dating mainly from the 13th century.	I
St Peter's Church	Claybrooke Parva, Leicestershire; 52.4869°N 1.2707°W		1876–78	Restoration of a church dating from about 1300.	I
St Mary's Church	Burwell, Cambridgeshire; 52.2698°N 0.3282°E		1877	Restoration of a church dating from the 15th century.	I
St George's Church	Clun, Shropshire; 52.4186°N 3.0301°W		1877	Restoration and additions to a church dating from the 15th century.	II*
St Mary's Church	Thirsk, North Yorkshire; 54.2349°N 1.3459°W		1877	Restoration of a church dating from the 15th century.	I
St Michael and All Angels Church	Thornhill, Dewsbury, West Yorkshire; 53.6656°N 1.6180°W		1877	Street designed the nave and vestry and carried out some restoration elsewhere in a church dating probably from the 15th century.	I
St Peter's Church	Edgmond, Shropshire; 52.7705°N 2.4161°W		1877–78	Restoration of a church originating in the 10th century.	I
St Giles' Church	South Mimms, Hertfordshire; 51.6962°N 0.2328°W		1877–78	Restoration of a church dating from the 13th century. Street also designed the rood screen, the pulpit, and the lectern.	I
St Mary the Virgin's Church	Rye, East Sussex; 50.9501°N 0.7342°E		1877–82	Restoration of a church dating from the 12th century.	I
St James' Church	Fulmer, Buckinghamshire; 51.5613°N 0.5602°W		1877–84	Addition of a chancel and south aisle.	II*
St Andrew's Church	Kirby Grindalythe, North Yorkshire; 54.0956°N 0.6196°W		1878	Rebuilding incorporating a 12th-century tower with a 14th-century belfry. For Sir Tatton Sykes, 5th Baronet of Sledmere.	II*
St Mary and St Chad's Church	Brewood, Staffordshire; 52.6755°N 2.1738°W		1878–80	Restoration of a church dating from the 13th century.	I
St Laurence's Church	Hilmarton, Wiltshire; 51.4770°N 1.9726°W		1879–81	Restoration of a church dating from the 12th century.	I
St Andrew's Cathedral	Aberdeen, Scotland; 57.3617°N 2.0930°W		1880	Added the chancel.	A
Fratry to former Priory of St Mary	Carlisle Cathedral, Cumbria; 54.8943°N 2.9391°W		1880–81	Restoration, re-creating the upper room.	I
St Margaret's Church	Leicester; 52.6404°N 1.1363°W		1881	Restoration of a church dating mainly from the 15th century.	I
St Boniface's Church	Nursling, Hampshire; 50.9466°N 1.4899°W		1881	Restoration of a church dating mainly from the 14th century.	II*
St Mary's Church	Upham, Hampshire; 50.9825°N 1.2341°W		1881	Restoration of a church dating from the 13th century.	II
St Mary's Priory Church	Monmouth, Monmouthshire, Wales; 51.8132°N 2.7139°W		1882	Restoration.	II*
St James's Sussex Gardens	Paddington, London	St James's Paddington	1882	Rebuilding of an 1843 church, realised after his death	II*
St Andrew's Church	Ashburton, Devon; 50.5143°N 3.7570°W		1882–83	Restoration of a church dating from the 15th century.	I
All Saints Church	Pickhill, North Yorkshire; 54.2483°N 1.4686°W		Undated	Restoration of a church dating from the 12th century.	II*
St Mary's Church	Winkfield, Berkshire; 51.4437°N 0.7004°W		Undated	Restoration of a church dating from the 14th century.	II*

== See also ==
- Buildings of Jesus College, Oxford
- List of new churches by G. E. Street
- List of domestic buildings by G. E. Street
- List of miscellaneous works by G. E. Street
