= List of miscellaneous works by G. E. Street =

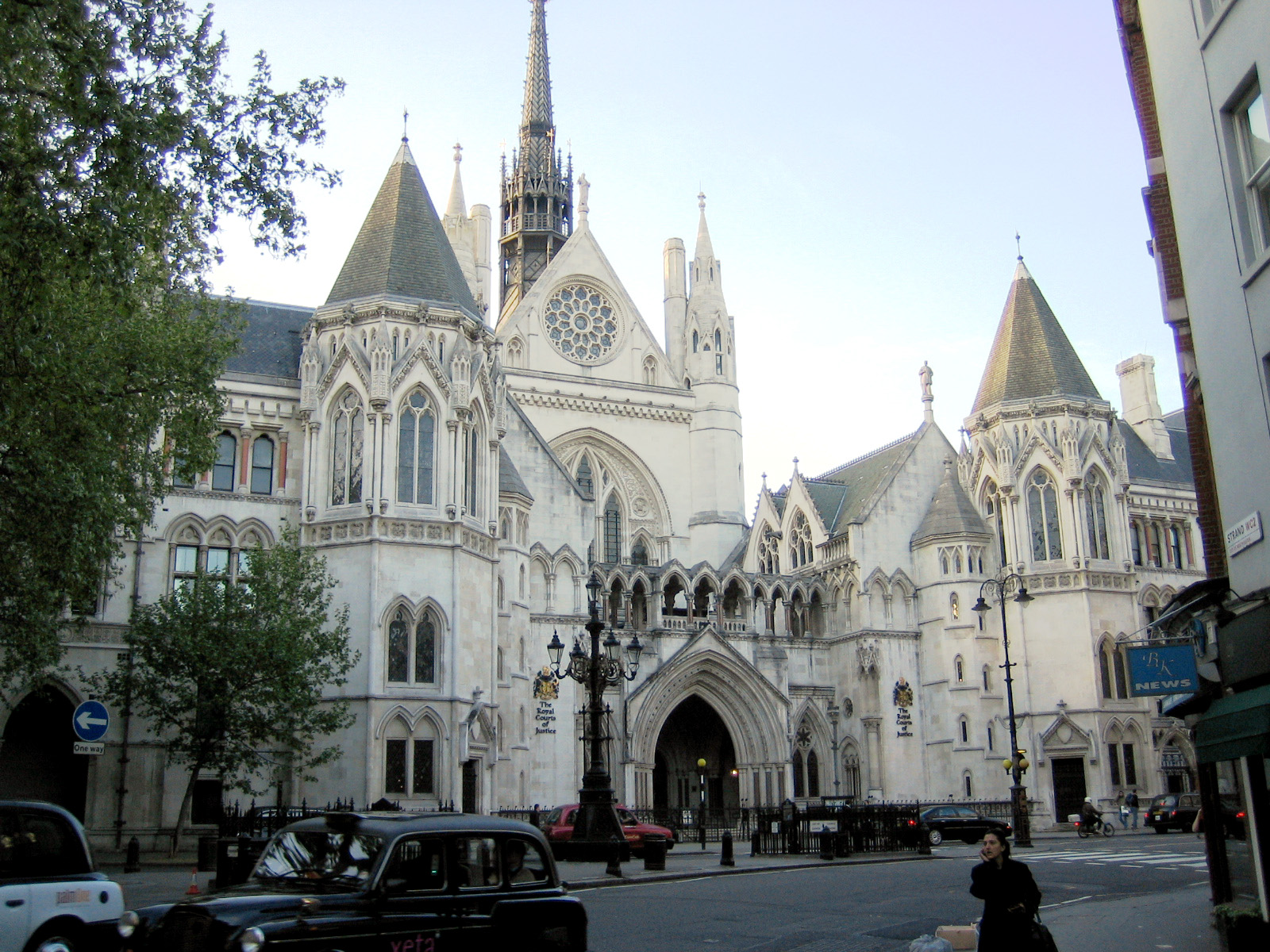
Royal Courts of Justice

G. E. Street (1824–81) was an English architect and architectural writer, whose designs were mainly in High Victorian Gothic style. Born the son of a solicitor, he first worked in a law office, but was then articled to the architect Owen Browne Carter in Winchester. Two years later, in 1844, he moved to London and worked in the office of George Gilbert Scott. Here he also worked with George Frederick Bodley and William White. Street established his own architectural practice in 1849, initially in London, and later in Wantage (then in Berkshire). He was appointed as architect to the diocese of Oxford in 1850, and retained this position until his death. He married in 1852 and in that year moved to Oxford. He returned to London in 1856 and maintained an office there for the remainder of his career. He travelled extensively, visiting the Continent of Europe frequently. Street was also a prolific writer on architectural subjects. He was a member of the Royal Academy, and in 1874 was awarded the Royal Gold Medal of the Royal Institute of British Architects, being its president in 1881.

Most of Street's works were in relation to churches; designing new churches, restoring and making additions and alterations to existing churches, and designing fittings and furnishings for them. He also designed domestic buildings, especially vicarages, and schools with houses for the schoolmaster. He designed little in the way of public buildings, although towards the end of his life he designed what has been described as his "greatest commission", the Royal Courts of Justice in London. Most of his works were in England, especially within and close to the diocese of Oxford, where he built or restored 113 churches, but examples of his work can be found throughout England, Wales and Ireland. He also designed some buildings abroad, including a church in Constantinople. Almost all his designs are in Gothic Revival style, in particular, in what is known as the High Victorian style. This style came chronologically after the use of "pure" and "correct" use of features of English Gothic architecture, which had been championed by A. W. N. Pugin and the Ecclesiological Society. High Victorian incorporated the use of polychromy, and elements of Continental forms of Gothic architecture. Street died in 1881, and was buried in Westminster Abbey.

This list contains buildings and structures not included in the See also section (below).

== Key ==
Grade	Criteria
Grade I	Buildings of exceptional interest, sometimes considered to be internationally important.
Grade II*	Particularly important buildings of more than special interest.
Grade II	Buildings of national importance and special interest.
"—" denotes a work that is not graded.

== Works ==
Name	Location	Photograph	Date	Notes	Grade
School	Ide Hill, Kent; 51.2465°N 0.1269°E		1852		II
School and schoolmaster's house	Goosey, Oxfordshire; 51.6236°N 1.4854°W		1853		II
School	Stanford in the Vale, Oxfordshire; 51.6378°N 1.5044°W		1853		II
Font	St Peter and St Paul's Church, Uppingham, Rutland; 52.5874°N 0.7221°W		1853	Originally designed for All Saints, Cottesbrooke.	II*
School and schoolmaster's house	Denchworth, Oxfordshire; 51.6229°N 1.4514°W		c. 1853		II
Ripon College	Cuddesdon, Oxfordshire; 51.7251°N 1.1342°W		1853–54	A theological college, extended in 1873–78 by Street, and later by different architects.	II*
Lychgate and churchyard walls	Milton-under-Wychwood, Oxfordshire; 51.8658°N 1.6173°W		1853–54		II
School and schoolmaster's house	Milton-under-Wychwood, Oxfordshire; 51.8664°N 1.6171°W		1853–54		II
Bloxham School	Bloxham, Oxfordshire; 52.0226°N 1.3733°W		1854	A new school with subsequent additions.	II
Parish centre	Maidenhead, Berkshire; 51.5196°N 0.7367°W		1854–57	Adjoining All Saints Church.	II*
Coach house	Maidenhead, Berkshire; 51.5195°N 0.7363°W		1854–57	Since converted into a house.	II
Primary school	Laverstoke, Hampshire; 51.2369°N 1.3031°W		1855		II
School and schoolmaster's house	East Challow, Oxfordshire; 51.5906°N 1.4526°W		1855–56	Since converted into a house.	II
St Mary's Convent	Wantage, Oxfordshire; 51.5914°N 1.4341°W		1855–72	Built in phases with additions later by other architects. The gateway and flanking walls are also designated at Grade II.	II
Threefold	Castle Ashby, Northamptonshire; 52.2233°N 0.7432°W		1856	Built as a school and school house. Extended later in the 19th century, and since converted into offices.	II
St Barnabas' School	Oxford; 51.7577°N 1.2684°W		1856		II
Wayside cross	Sandford St. Martin, Oxfordshire; 51.9363°N 1.3904°W		1856	Restoration of a medieval cross.	II
Blithfield House	Admaston, Staffordshire; 52.8080°N 1.9283°W		1856–57	Built as a school and schoolmaster's house. Later used as the village hall.	II
School and schoolmaster's house	Blymhill, Staffordshire; 52.7078°N 2.2850°W		1856–59		II
School and schoolmaster's house	Church Leigh, Staffordshire; 52.9220°N 1.9668°W		1857		II
East window and pulpit	St Nicholas' Church, Cuddington, Buckinghamshire; 51.7947°N 0.9323°W		1857	Window made by Powells.	II*
School	Little Gaddesden, Hertfordshire; 51.8114°N 0.5605°W		1857–58	Consisting of two schoolrooms in an L-shape.	
School	Colnbrook, Berkshire; 51.4845°N 0.5219°W		1858	Later used as Colnbrook Youth Centre.	II
St James' school and church hall	New Bradwell, Milton Keynes, Buckinghamshire; 52.0650°N 0.7927°W		1858		II
St Mary's Primary School	Shipton-under-Wychwood, Oxfordshire; 51.8605°N 1.5962°W		1858		II
East window	St Nicholas' Church, Baydon, Wiltshire; 51.5009°N 1.5962°W		1859		II*
Royal Free Schools	Bachelor's Acre, Windsor, Berkshire; 51.4806°N 0.6091°W		1859		II
Churchyard walls	Shipton-under-Wychwood, Oxfordshire; 51.8595°N 1.5952°W		c. 1859 (?)		II
All Saints Church Hall	Denstone, Staffordshire; 52.9646°N 1.8517°W		c. 1860		II
School	Banbury, Oxfordshire; 52.0638°N 1.3256°W		1860–61	Built as a school, since used as offices.	II
All Saints Church of England Primary School	Denstone, Staffordshire; 52.9646°N 1.8516°W		1860–62		II
All Saints Vicarage	Denstone, Staffordshire; 52.9658°N 1.8526°W		1860–62		II*
Parish rooms and school	St James the Less, City of Westminster, Greater London; 51.4907°N 0.1349°W		1861	The railings surrounding the playground were also designed by Street and are listed at Grade II*.	I
School room	Uppingham School, Rutland; 52.5878°N 0.7247°W		1861–63		II*
Lychgate	All Saints Church, Denstone, Staffordshire; 52.9653°N 1.8516°W		1862		II
Churchyard cross	All Saints Church, Denstone, Staffordshire; 52.9652°N 1.8520°W		1862		II
School and schoolmaster's house	Brightwalton, Berkshire; 51.5110°N 1.3867°W		1863		II
School	Cleobury Mortimer, Shropshire; 52.3808°N 2.4817°W		1863	Since converted for residential use.	II
Memorial	St Michael and All Angels Church, Lyndhurst, Hampshire; 50.8723°N 1.5778°W		1863	Memorial on the north wall in the form of an Easter Sepulchre in memory of the founders of the church, Mr and Mrs Hargreaves.	I
Pulpit	All Saints Church, Marlow, Buckinghamshire; 51.5680°N 0.7730°W		1863	Street designed the stone and marble pulpit that is integral with the stone chancel screen.	II*
Mausoleum	West Norwood Cemetery, Greater London; 51.4339°N 0.0965°W		c. 1863	Mausoleum to J. P. Ralli in the Greek Orthodox enclosure.	II*
School	Amington, Tamworth, Staffordshire; 52.6364°N 1.6577°W		1863–64	Since used as a community centre.	II
Pewsey National School	Pewsey, Wiltshire; 51.3373°N 1.7614°W		1863–64	A school and schoolmaster's house.	II
Porny School	Eton, Berkshire; 51.4896°N 0.6089°W		1863–73	A school and schoolmaster's house.	II
Coach House	Edgefield House, North Muskham, Nottinghamshire; 51.1280°N 0.8155°W		1865	Built for Revd Winstanley Hall.	II
St Margaret's Convent	East Grinstead, West Sussex; 51.1330°N 0.0116°W		1865–	Building commenced in 1865 with additions continuing throughout the rest of Street's life, and then were continued by his son, A. E. Street.	I
Reredos	St Mary's Church, Chiddingstone, Kent; 51.1863°N 0.1462°E		1866	Reredos with an alabaster Crucifixion relief carved by Earp.	II*
Reredos	St George's Church, Pontesbury, Shropshire; 52.6492°N 2.8887°W		1866	Marble reredos depicting events around the Crucifixion with a mosaic background in grey, red and gold.	II*
Reredos	St Andrew's Church, Swavesey, Cambridgeshire; 52.3057°N 0.0027°W		1866		I
School	Chapmanslade, Wiltshire; 51.2295°N 2.2514°W		1866–67		II
Village school and schoolmaster's house	High Halden, Kent; 51.1025°N 0.7143°E		1868		II
Lychgate and churchyard walls	St Mary the Virgin's Church, Wansford, East Yorkshire; 53.9949°N 0.3808°W		1868	For Sir Tatton Sykes, 5th Baronet of Sledmere.	II
School Hall	Dover College, Dover, Kent; 51.1267°N 1.3077°E		1868-	Originally the refectory of Dover Priory; converted into the school hall by Street.	II*
Reredos	St Mary's Church, Bletchingley, Surrey; 51.2414°N 0.0995°W		1870		I
Lychgate	St Mary's Church, Thixendale, North Yorkshire; 54.03900°N 0.7154°W		c. 1870	For Sir Tatton Sykes, 5th Baronet of Sledmere.	II
Gazebo and walls	Bayfield House, Lydford, Devon; 50.6427°N 4.1077°W		1870	Gazebo and terrace wall in the garden of Bayfield House.	II
Churchyard cross	St Peter's Church, Bournemouth, Dorset; 50.7203°N 1.8755°W		1871	Designed by Street, carved by T. W. Earp.	II
School and house	Warminster, Wiltshire; 51.2009°N 2.1667°W		1871		II
School	Ashbury, Oxfordshire; 51.56423°N 1.6202°W		c. 1872	Later used as the village hall.	II
Coach house and stables	Helperthorpe, North Yorkshire; 54.1212°N 0.5433°W		1873		II
Stable block	Holmdale, Holmbury St Mary, Surrey; 51.1830°N 0.4118°W		1873	Adjacent to a house Street built for himself and his son. Since converted into a house.	II
Bradleian Building	Marlborough College, Wiltshire; 51.4176°N 1.7363°W		1873	The arcade between the Bradleian Building and the Museum Block is also listed at Grade II.	II
Churchyard cross	Thixendale, North Yorkshire; 54.03890°N 0.7153°W		c. 1874	For Sir Tatton Sykes, 5th Baronet of Sledmere.	II
School and schoolmaster's house	Thixendale, North Yorkshire; 54.0390°N 0.7161°W		1874–75	Originally a school and schoolmaster's house, later used as a village hall and youth hostel. For Sir Tatton Sykes, 5th Baronet of Sledmere.	II
Royal Courts of Justice	Strand, Greater London; 51.5136°N 0.1132°W		1874–82	Completed after Street's death by his son A. E. Street, and by Arthur Blomfield. The screen walls, gates, railings and lamps associated with the building are also listed at Grade I.	I
School and schoolmaster's house	Sledmere, East Yorkshire; 54.0702°N 0.5707°W		1875	Later additions and alterations.	II
Footbridge, lychgate, and churchyard walls.	St Mary's Church, West Lutton, North Yorkshire; 54.1105°N 0.5775°W		1875	For Sir Tatton Sykes, 5th Baronet of Sledmere.	II
Porter's lodge	Marlborough College, Wiltshire; 51.4178°N 1.7372°W		1876–77		II
Gatepiers, gates and railings	Marlborough College Chapel, Wiltshire; 51.4177°N 1.7375°W		1876–77		II
Churchyard cross	St Andrew's Church, East Heslerton, North Yorkshire; 54.1773°N 0.5829°W		1877		II
Lychgate	St Andrew's Church, East Heslerton, North Yorkshire; 54.1774°N 0.5830°W		1877		II
School and schoolmaster's house	Wansford, East Yorkshire; 53.9957°N 0.3806°W		1877	For Sir Tatton Sykes, 5th Baronet of Sledmere. Later converted into a single house.	II
Churchyard cross, steps and platform	St Andrew's Church, Kirby Grindalythe, North Yorkshire; 54.0955°N 0.6195°W		1878	For Sir Tatton Sykes, 5th Baronet of Sledmere.	II
Lychgate, footgate and churchyard walls	St Andrew's Church, Kirby Grindalythe, North Yorkshire; 54.0953°N 0.6197°W		1878		II
School	Melksham, Wiltshire; 51.3736°N 2.1404°W		1878	Originated as a tithe barn; remodelled by Street into a school; since converted into dwellings.	II
Chancel	St Mary's Church, Down St Mary, Devon; 50.8260°N 3.7862°W		1878–80	Design and decoration of the chancel, and its furnishings.	I
Library	Dover College, Dover, Kent; 51.1263°N 1.3067°E		1880	Originally the gatehouse of Dover Priory, it was later converted into a library, and restored by Street.	II*
Barrow Deep and old school	Eastbury, Berkshire; 51.4924°N 1.5026°W		Undated	Later houses.	II
School	Lambourn, Berkshire; 51.5076°N 1.5315°W		Undated	Originally a school, later a house.	II
Reredos	St Peter's Church, Leeds, West Yorkshire; 53.7952°N 1.5360°W		Undated	Marble and alabaster reredos representing Christ in His Glory.	I

== See also ==
- List of new churches by G. E. Street
- List of church restorations and alterations by G. E. Street
- List of domestic buildings by G. E. Street
