= St Peter's Church, Heswall =

Coordinates: 53.3228°N 3.1036°W

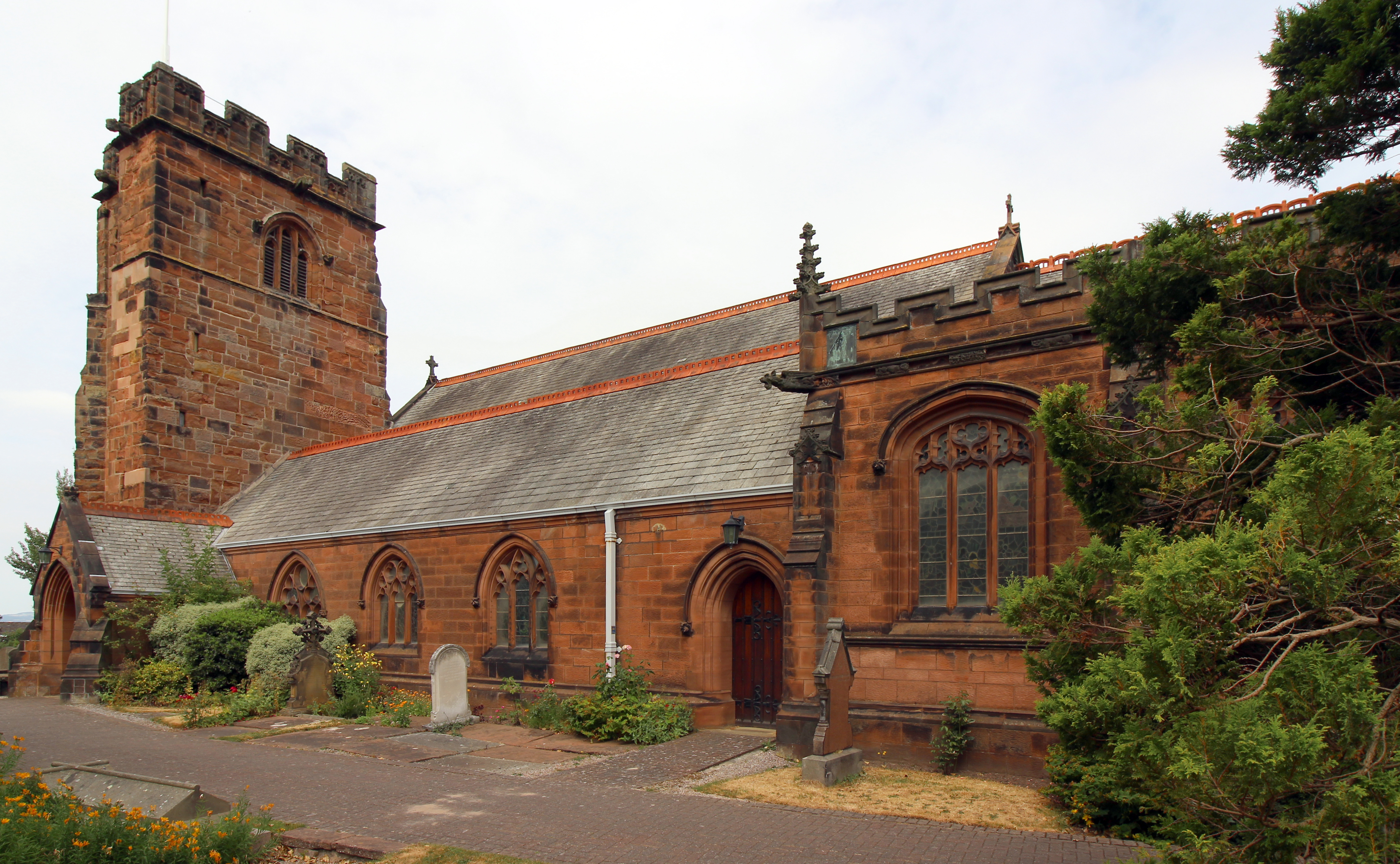
- St Peter's Church, Heswall, from the south

- Location in Merseyside
- OS grid reference: SJ 266 812
- Location: Heswall, Wirral, Merseyside
- Country: England
- Denomination: Anglican
- Churchmanship: Open Evangelical
- Website: Parish of Heswall

History
- Status: Parish church
- Dedication: St Peter

Architecture
- Functional status: Active
- Heritage designation: Grade II*
- Designated: 15 November 1962
- Architect: J. Francis Doyle
- Architectural type: Church
- Style: Gothic, Gothic Revival
- Groundbreaking: 1306
- Completed: 1893

Specifications
- Materials: Sandstone, slate roof

Administration
- Province: York
- Diocese: Chester
- Archdeaconry: Chester
- Deanery: Wirral North
- Parish: Heswall

Clergy
- Rector: Rev. Martin Cannam

St Peter's Church is in the town of Heswall, Wirral, Merseyside, England. The church is recorded in the National Heritage List for England as a designated Grade II* listed building. It is an active Anglican parish church in the diocese of Chester, the archdeaconry of Chester and the deanery of Wirral North.

== History ==
The oldest part of the church is the base of the tower which dates from 1306. The upper parts were added in the late 15th century. The rest of the church was rebuilt in 1739 in Neoclassical style. In 1875, the church was struck by lightning and seriously damaged. In 1879 the church, other than the tower, was completely rebuilt by J. Francis Doyle. In 1893 the south chancel chapel was built, also by Doyle.

== Architecture ==
=== Exterior ===
The church is built in sandstone with a slate roof. Its plan consists of a nave with clerestory, north and south aisles, a tower at the southwest, and a chancel with a north vestry and a south chapel. The tower has diagonal west buttresses and a three-light west window. The bell stage has three-light louvred bell openings and is in Perpendicular style. Above this is a cornice and an embattled parapet. At the southeast is a square stair turret.

=== Interior ===
After the 19th-century restoration, some of the memorials were moved to the base of the tower. These include a black marble tablet to John Glegg, who died in 1619, depicting his kneeling figure, a white and grey marble tablet in memory of Katherine Glegg who died in 1666, and an alabaster plaque with the seal of William de Hesele Wele who lived in the early 14th century. The baluster font dates from the 18th century. The chandelier under the tower is from the late 17th century. The reredos and much of the stained glass is by Kempe. At the west end of the church are the Royal arms of George III. The organ was built in 1947 by Rushworth and Dreaper. There is a ring of eight bells, all of which were recast in 1978 by John Taylor and Company. The parish registers begin in 1539 and churchwardens' accounts in 1778.

== External features ==
In the churchyard is a stone sundial dated 1726 consisting of a baluster-shaped shaft on two circular steps. On the top of this is an octagonal plate and a gnomon. The churchyard also contains the war graves of fourteen Commonwealth service personnel of World War I (the oldest being 74-year-old Lieutenant-Colonel W. Alexander of the Royal Army Medical Corps) and ten of World War II.

== See also ==
- Grade II* listed buildings in Merseyside
- Listed buildings in Heswall
