= William Rushworth (organ builder) =

William Rushworth (born 1807) was an English organ builder and the founder of the musical instrument firm Rushworth and Dreaper. The firm was noted for the manufacture of organs at The Queen's College, Oxford, the Royal Military College, Sandhurst, Goldsmiths' College, Guilford Cathedral and Liverpool Philharmonic Hall.

== Biography ==
Rushworth was born in 1807 in Honley, West Yorkshire, and baptised on 23 October. He had three children: Edwin, Alfred and Walter. His wife, Sarah, died in 1844.
