= List of organs by Rushworth and Dreaper in Cheshire =

Rushworth and Dreaper was a company based in Liverpool, England, that built, renovated and restored pipe organs. It was founded in 1828 by William Rushworth and closed in 2002. This list contains the organs associated with Rushworth and Dreaper in the county of Cheshire.

== New organs ==
Location	Date	Condition	Manuals	Stops	Couplers	Notes
St John the Evangelist's Church, Winsford; 53.1922°N 2.5480°W	c. 1885	Playable	2	21/19	6	The organ was built for Holy Trinity Church, Hoylake. It was rebuilt in 1919 by E. Wadsworth, and there were further alterations in the 1940s. The organ was moved to Winsford by Rushworth and Dreaper in about 1975 when Holy Trinity was about to be demolished.
St Thomas' Church, Widnes; 53.3712°N 2.7757°W	c. 1900	Playable (exported)	2	7	3	In 2004 the organ was removed and sold to a patron in Germany.
Little Neston Methodist Church; 53.2847°N 3.0528°W	1909	Maintained	1	6	1	
St James' Church, Latchford; 53.3830°N 2.5911°W	1914	Playable	2	14	4	The organ was renovated, also by Rushworth and Dreaper in 1981.
St Mary's Church, Warrington; 53.3897°N 2.5888°W	1927	Playable	2	33	10	The organ replaced an earlier organ. In 1963 Henry Willis & Sons reduced it from three manuals to two, and made other alterations.
St Michael and All Angels Church, Crewe Green; 53.0947°N 2.4093°W	1939	Destroyed or broken up	2	19	3	The organ received attention from Leonard Reeves in 1983. It was broken up and replaced by an electronic organ in about 1995.
St Mary's Church, Hale; 53.3325°N 2.7952°W	1939	Destroyed	2	15	6	The organ was destroyed by fire in 1977, and was replaced by a larger organ by Leonard Reeves.
Methodist Church, Antrobus; 53.3207°N 2.5329°W	1948	Maintained	2	19	3	The organ received attention from Leonard Reeves in 1986.
St John's Church, Hartford; 53.2458°N 2.5442°W	1962	Replaced	2	21	3	This organ replaced one possibly by Henry Willis, and was itself replaced by a digital organ in 1993.
St Mary's Church, Upton	Unknown	Not known	2	16	6	Date and other details not known.
Bewsey Road Methodist Church, Warrington	Unknown	Not known	2	23	7	Rebuilt by Rushworth and Dreaper. The church was demolished in 1966.
St Thomas' Church, Whitby; 53.2757°N 2.9070°W	Unknown	Replaced	2	12	4	The organ was replaced by one from St Michael's Church, Chester in about 1978.

== Repairs and rebuilding ==
Location	Date	Condition	Manuals	Stops	Couplers	Notes
St Oswald's Church, Winwick; 53.4308°N 2.5979°W	c. 1838	Superseded	2	18	3	The organ was moved from a private chapel in Powis Castle and was probably installed here by Rushworth and Dreaper. They carried out work on the organ in the succeeding years. This organ was replaced in 1997 by a digital organ.
St Luke's Church, Lower Whitley; 53.3054°N 2.5802°W	1907	Playable	2	19	4	The organ was built in about 1880 by Henry Willis & Sons, and additions were made by Rushworth and Dreaper. Furrher alterations were made in 1950 by Kingsgate Davidson.
St Patrick's Church, Widnes	1913	Transferred	2	14	4	The organ was transferred here from another site and installed by Rushworth and Dreaper. It received attention in 1985 from J. T. Molineux. The church was demolished in 1999, and the organ was moved into the crypt of the Liverpool Metropolitan Cathedral.
St John the Evangelist's Church, Sandiway; 53.2359°N 2.5920°W	1939	Playable	2	16	6	The organ was built by Wadsworth and moved here from Burnley. It was cleaned in 1917, again by Wadsworth, and then rebuilt by Rushworth and Dreaper.
St John's Church, Northwich; 53.2575°N 2.5192°W	1939	Playable	2	16	5	The organ was rebuilt by Rushworth and Dreaper. The date and original builder are not known.
St Mary Magdalene's Church, Alsager; 53.0960°N 2.3071°W	1945	Playable	3	34	8	Built in 1905 by Steele and Kay, It received attention from Rushworth and Dreaper in 1945, further attention was given in 1978 by Ward and Shutt, and the pedal action was changed to electric in 1979.
Chester College Chapel; 53.1989°N 2.8965°W	c. 1945	Superseded	2	24	7	The organ was built in about 1889 by Casson of Denbigh, and rebuilt by Rushworth and Dreaper. By 2005 it has been rebuilt again by George Sixsmith.
St Luke's Church, Goostrey; 53.2267°N 2.3071°W	1947	Destroyed or broken up	2	13	5	Built by Wadsworth and Company in 1876, the organ was moved by Rushworth and Dreaper to the west gallery and a new console was provided. By 2008 it was in "an advanced stage of dilapidation".
St Oswald's Church, Malpas; 53.0196°N 2.7671°W	c. 1962	Playable	2	19	3	The organ was built at an uncertain date by Holdich of London and enlarged in 1897 by Lewis and Company, also of London. Rushworth and Dreaper overhauled it, and it was later renovated by Peter Collins. The organ was awarded a Historic Organ Certificate in 1999.
St Thomas' Church, Stockton Heath; 53.3724°N 2.5824°W	1963	Not known	2	23	5	Built by Young and Sons in about 1880, it was rebuilt by Rushworth and Dreaper.
St Michael and All Angels, Middlewich; 53.1925°N 2.4447°W	1964	Playable	2	22	5	Built in 1908 by Conacher, it was later moved from the south aisle to the west end. Rushworth and Dreaper radically rebuilt it, and since then there have been further alterations.
Chester Cathedral (main organ); 53.1919°N 2.8905°W	1969	Playable	4	72	12	The organ was built in 1908 by William Hill & Sons, and it was rebuilt by Rushworth and Dreaper. The case was designed by George Gilbert Scott.
St Nicholas' Church, Burton; 53.2616°N 3.0250°W	1985	Playable	2	25	3	The organ was built in about 1935 by the John Compton Organ Company of London. Rushworth and Dreaper renovated it and provided a new case.
St Mary's Church, Disley; 53.3575°N 2.0395°W	1985	Playable	3	28	6	The organ was built in 1882 by A. Young of Manchester, and renovations and alterations were carried out in 1949 by Jardine and in 1977 by Church and Company of Stamfordham. Rushworth and Dreaper made mainly minor repairs. The organ has a case by Samuel Renn.
St James' Church, Christleton; 53.1856°N 2.8384°W	c. 1990	Not known	2	15	3	The organ was built at an unknown date by Holdich, and was rebuilt by Rushworth and Dreaper.
St Mary's Church, Nantwich; 53.0670°N 2.5206°W	1994	Playable	3	38	9	Built by Forster and Andrews in 1890, it was partly rebuilt in about 1925, and further works was carried out by Charles Whiteley and Company of Chester in 1946, 1973, and 1985. Rushworth and Dreaper restored and expanded it.
St Thomas' Church, Norbury; 53.0217°N 2.6597°W	Unknown	Not known	2	20	7	The organ was built by F. W. Jardine of Manchester. The date and details of the work carried out by Rushworth and Dreaper are not recorded.
St Leonard's Church, Warmingham; 53.1460°N 2.4366°W	Unknown	Not known	2	13	3	The organ was built by Edward Wadsworth of Manchester. The date and details of the work carried out by Rushworth and Dreaper are not recorded.
St Elphin's Church, Warrington; 53.3910°N 2.5799°W	Unknown	Not known	3	47	12	The organ was built by Gray and Davison in 1876 and expanded by them in 1881. At a later date it was rebuilt by Young. After this it received attention from Rushworth and Dreaper but the date and details of the work carried out is not known. In 1946 it was rebuilt again, but the name of the builder is not recorded.
