= Septimus Francom =

British long-distance runner

Personal information
- Nationality: British
- Born: 14 September 1882 Thingwall, Cheshire, England
- Died: 15 March 1965 (aged 82) Barnston, Cheshire, England

Sport
- Sport: Long-distance running
- Event: Marathon

Septimus Francom (14 September 1882 – 15 March 1965) was a British long-distance runner. He specialised in cross country running and the marathon. He won several marathons (Hull 1912, 1913, 1914) and cross country races (Liverpool and District cross-country champion, 1912–23). He competed in the marathon at the 1912 Summer Olympics, but did not finish the race.

He worked at Prenton Golf Club and later the railways. He practiced running along the track because the spacing of the railway sleepers suited his racing stride. He had a son who also raced competitively. Francom was also successful with racing pigeons.
