= Rushworth and Dreaper =

English organ builders

Coordinates: 53°24′50.7″N 2°58′36.8″W

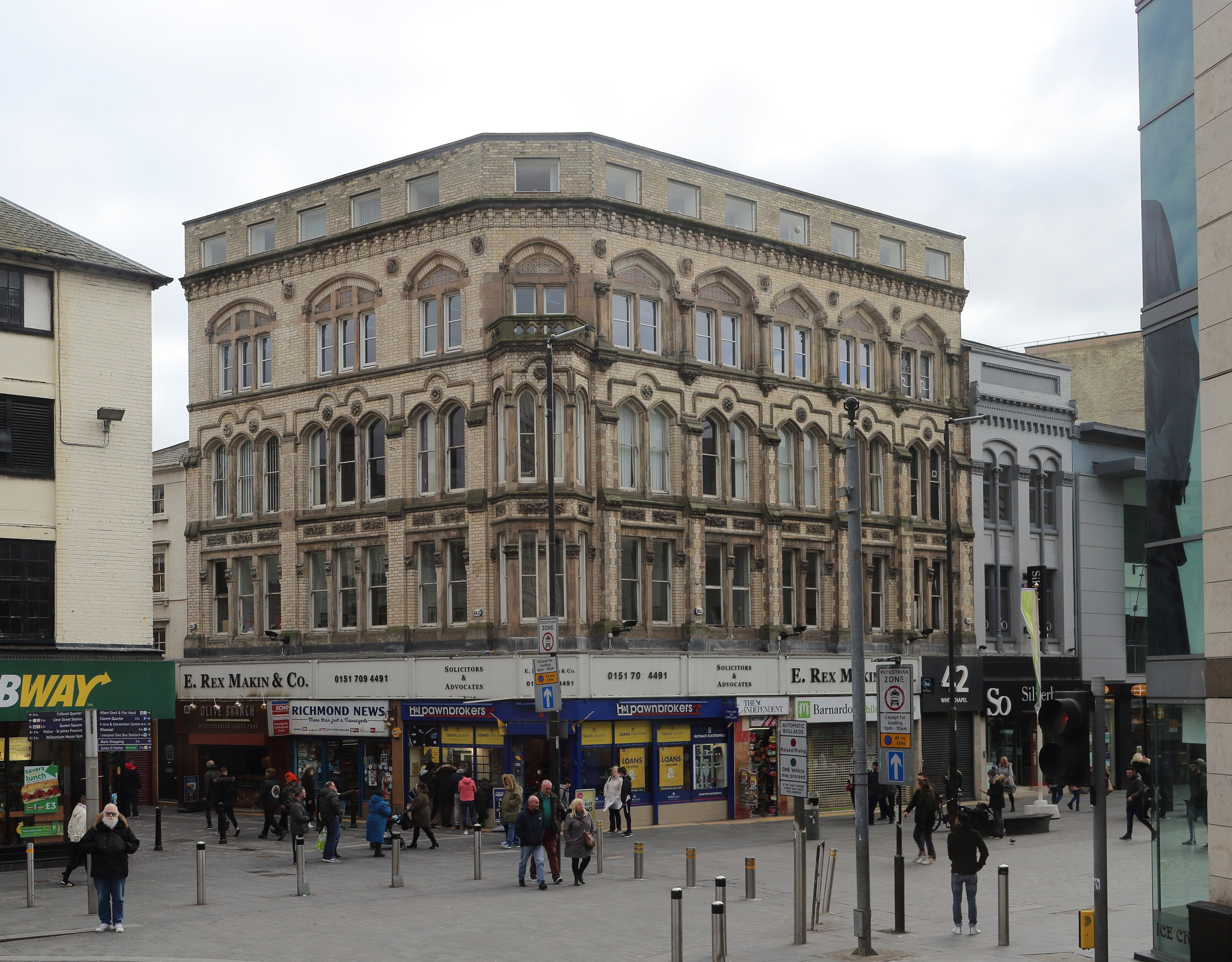
The old Rushworth and Dreaper instrument shop

Rushworth and Dreaper was a firm of organ builders, and later general instrument suppliers associated with Paul McCartney, based in Liverpool.

The manufacturer was founded in 1828 by William Rushworth. In the 1950s it absorbed Wilkinson, the Kendal organ builders. It operated until 2002. Upon its liquidation, its archives were mostly destroyed, and the Victorian clock in the works tower was removed. The premises are now occupied by Henry Willis & Sons, which was previously based in Hampshire.

== Organs built by the company (ordered by year) ==
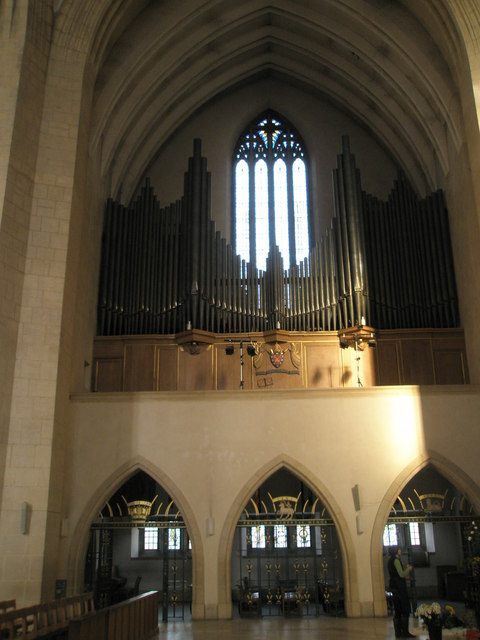
- The organ in Guildford Cathedral
  St Oswald's Church, Winwick, 1838.
- All Saints' Church, Bradbourne Derbyshire 1866
- St Mary's Church, Knowsley, 1913.
- Liverpool Collegiate School, 1913.
- Eastcliffe Congregational Church, Bournemouth, 1914.
- Our Lady & St Alphege, Bath, 1915.
- St Anne's Church, Stanley, 1916
- St Germain's Church, Edgbaston, Birmingham, 1922.
- St Barnabas' Church, Bromborough, 1923.
- St Hildeburgh's Church, Hoylake, 1924 (?)
- St Andrew's Church, West Kirby, 1925.
- St. Laurence and All Saints Church, Eastwood, Essex, 1925
- St Michael's & All Angels Church, Windmill Hill, Bedminster, Bristol, 1927 – Opening recital by Mr W. Maynard Rushworth.
- Malvern Priory, 1927.
- Stowe School Chapel, 1928.
- The Queen's College, Oxford, 1931.
- Christ's Hospital School chapel - 5 manual organ, Horsham, 1931/2023.
- St Mary's Church, Northop Hall, 1931
- Manchester Grammar School, 1931
- Howden Minster, East Riding of Yorkshire, 1933.
- All Hallows Church, Whitchurch, Hampshire, 1935
- St. Joseph's Church, Penarth, 1935.
- St. Margaret's Church, Aspley, 1936.
- St. Cuthberts Church Brislington Bristol, 1937.
- St. Michael and All Angels Church, Bassett, Hampshire, 1937.
- Holy Cross Church, Woodchurch, 1938.
- St John's Church, Wainfelin, 1938.
- Church of the Holy Rude, Stirling 1940.
- All Saints Church, Clifton, Bristol, 1946 (the previous organ built by "Harrison & Harrison" was destroyed by German bombing in 1940).
- St Peter's Church, Heswall, 1947.
- Heathfield Road Welsh Presbyterian Church, Liverpool – largely demolished 2011. Installed by Rushworth & Dreaper in 1950. Dismantled November 2010 by Jardines for a private owner and moved in several lorries to another former Welsh Presbyterian chapel in Mid Wales for restoration along with some contemporary contents from the since demolished Liverpool Church. Evidence uncovered by Jardines and new owner indicates that this tubular pneumatic instrument was probably rebuilt from a much earlier 19th-century Hope-Jones Organ. There are traces of some tracking, the feet and detail of the wooden pipes are typical of Hope-Jones and have the same paint colours as Hope-Jones examples observed elsewhere. Several cast iron weights from the regulators are cast with the words HOPE JONES and two others have N & L (?) castings. More details on National Pipe Organ Register.
- Royal Memorial Chapel, Royal Military Academy Sandhurst 1950
- Christ Church Thornton le Fylde 1950
- Stockport Grammar School, 1951.
- The Great Hall, Goldsmiths College, London.
- St Saviour's Church, Oxton.
- Church of Our Lady and Saint Nicholas, Liverpool 1952
- St Michael's Church, Blundellsands, Liverpool 1952
- St Catherine's Church, Westonbirt, 1953
- Albion Congregational Church, 1953
- St Mark's Church, Bromley, 1954.
- St Mary the Virgin, Hennock, Devon, 1954.
- Tyndale Baptist, Clifton, Bristol, 1956. 6 Ranks Extension – Fully enclosed in 2 boxes – Detached tab console. More details on National Pipe Organ Register.
- St Andrew's Church, Plymouth, 1957.
- St.Martin's Baguley, Manchester, 1960.
- Guildford Cathedral, 1961.
- Liverpool Philharmonic Hall, 1961.
- St John the Evangelist RC Church, Portobello, 1961
- Victoria Hall, Halifax, 1963 (rebuild of 1901 William Hill instrument
- Avenue Methodist Church, Sale, 1963 – 4 unit extension organ.
- St Michael and All Angels Church, Hawkshead, Cumbria. 1965.
- Ealing Abbey, St Benedict's School, London 1967.
- Cathedral of Our Lady Assumed into Heaven and Saint Nicholas (Galway Cathedral), Galway, Ireland, 1966
- Keele University, chapel, 1966
- Church of the Ascension, Kenton, Newcastle upon Tyne, 1966
- Leeds Trinity University Chapel, Horsforth, 1968
- Allerton Presbyterian Church (now Allerton United Reformed Church), Liverpool, (rebuilt from Norman & Beard, ex Merton Road, Bootle), 1969
- St Mary's Church, Mold, 1972.
- Holy Trinity Brompton Church, London, 1974 (formerly the organ was at St. Mark's Church, North Audley Street, London).
- Parish of St Benedict Ealing Abbey, London, 1974.
- The Chapel of the Resurrection, University of Ibadan, Ibadan, Nigeria 1978
- Hoarse Memorial Methodist Cathedral, Yaba, Lagos, Nigeria 1978
- The Cathedral of St David, Kudeti, Ibadan, Nigeria 1984
- Chapel of Liverpool Blue Coat School (1906)
- Chapel of Wrekin College, Wellington 1937

== See also ==
- List of organs by Rushworth and Dreaper in Cheshire
