= Sykes baronets of Kingsknowes (1921) =

Escutcheon of the Sykes baronets of Kingsknowes

The Sykes Baronetcy, of Kingsknowes in Galashiels in the County of Selkirk, was created in the Baronetage of the United Kingdom on 17 June 1921 for Charles Sykes, a woollen manufacturer and Member of Parliament for Huddersfield from 1918 to 1922.

== Sykes baronets, of Kingsknowes (1921) ==
- Sir Charles Sykes, 1st Baronet (1867–1950)
- Sir (Benjamin) Hugh Sykes, 2nd Baronet (1893–1974)
- Sir John Charles Anthony le Gallais Sykes, 3rd Baronet (1928–2001)
- Sir David Michael Sykes, 4th Baronet (born 1954)

The heir apparent is Stephen David Sykes (born 1978), eldest son of the 4th Baronet.
