= Barnston, Merseyside =

Village on the Wirral Peninsula, in the county of Merseyside, England

Coordinates: 53.344°N 3.076°W

Barnston
- Village
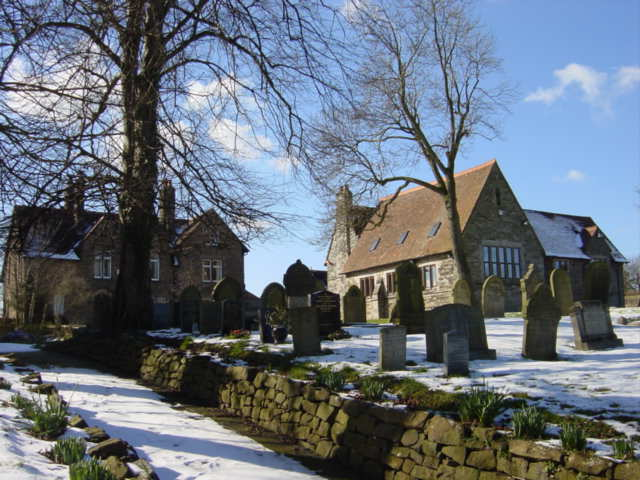
- The churchyard of Christchurch, during winter 2006

- Location within Merseyside
- Population: 947 (2011 Census)
- OS grid reference: SJ284835
  - London: 178 mi (286 km) SE
- Metropolitan borough: Wirral
- Metropolitan county: Merseyside
- Region: North West
- Country: England
- Sovereign state: United Kingdom
- Post town: WIRRAL
- Postcode district: CH61
- Dialling code: 0151
- ISO 3166 code: GB-WRL
- Police: Merseyside
- Fire: Merseyside
- Ambulance: North West
- UK Parliament: Wirral West

Barnston is a village and former civil parish in the Wirral district, in the county of Merseyside, England, situated on the Wirral Peninsula to the north east of Heswall. The village is in the Pensby & Thingwall Ward and the parliamentary constituency of Wirral West. At the 2001 Census, Barnston had a population of 3,620 (1,700 males, 1,920 females) At the 2011 Census, the population was 947 (501 males, 441 females).

== History ==
Barnston is mentioned in the Domesday Book as Bernestone and comprised two mills, a manor house and a hospital. It was part of the Wirral Hundred.

Barnston was formerly a township in the parish of Woodchurch, from 1866 Barnston was a civil parish in its own right, on 1 April 1974 the parish was abolished. The civil parish's population was 129 in 1801, 239 in 1851, 522 in 1901 and 2578 in 1951.

On 24 March 1962, The Beatles performed at the Barnston Women's Institute. It is noted that this was the first time that Brian Epstein put The Beatles into suits for their performances. John Lennon regarded this as the first, and perhaps the ultimate, sellout of their career. The Beatles played here again on Saturday 30 June and Tuesday 25 September 1962.

On 1 April 1974, local government reorganisation in England and Wales resulted in most of Wirral, including Barnston, being transferred from the county of Cheshire to Merseyside.

== Geography ==
Barnston is in the central part of the Wirral Peninsula, approximately 8.5 km (5.3 mi) south-south-east of the Irish Sea at Meols, about 3 km (1.9 mi) east-north-east of the Dee Estuary at Heswall and 6 km (3.7 mi) west-south-west of the River Mersey at New Ferry. Barnston is situated between Poll Hill in Heswall and Storeton Hill, with the village at an elevation of around 67 m (220 ft) above sea level.

== Community ==
Village landmarks include Christchurch parish church, which was opened in 1871, a primary school and the Fox & Hounds public house.

The Barnstondale Centre, originally Scott's Field and known locally as 'The Camp', is set on a 15-acre (6.1 ha) site which includes woodland. It is an all-weather activity centre and charitable trust.

== Transport ==
=== Rail ===
Heswall railway station on the Borderlands Line is located approximately 1.1 miles (1.8 km) from Barnston and provides services between Wrexham and Bidston.

== People ==
- E. Chambré Hardman, Irish photographer, lived in Barnston.
- Septimus Francom, English athlete, died in Barnston.
- Leslie Williams, English Anglican priest, incumbent in Barnston.

== See also ==
- Listed buildings in Heswall

== Bibliography ==
- Mortimer, William Williams (1847). The History of the Hundred of Wirral. London: Whittaker & Co. pp284-285.
