= George Edmund Street =

English architect (1824–1881)

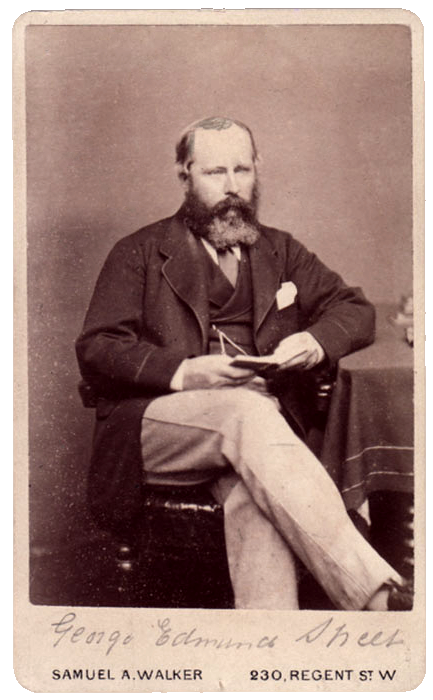
- Born: 20 June 1824; Woodford, Essex
- Died: 18 December 1881 (aged 57); London
- Occupation: Architect
- Awards: Royal Gold Medal (1874)
- Buildings: Royal Courts of Justice, The Strand, London

George Edmund Street RA (20 June 1824 – 18 December 1881), also known as G. E. Street, was an English architect, born at Woodford in Essex. Stylistically, Street was a leading practitioner of the Victorian Gothic Revival. Though mainly an ecclesiastical architect, he is perhaps best known as the designer of the Royal Courts of Justice on the Strand in London.

== Early life ==
Street was the third son of Thomas Street, a solicitor, by his second wife, Mary Anne Millington. He went to school at Mitcham in about 1830, and later to the Camberwell Collegiate School, which he left in 1839. For a few months he worked in his father's business in Philpot Lane, but on his father's death he went to live with his mother and sister at Exeter. There his thoughts first turned to architecture, and in 1841 his mother obtained a place for him as a pupil in the office of Owen Browne Carter at Winchester. Afterwards he worked for five years as an "improver" with George Gilbert Scott in London.

Street's first commission – undertaken while still working for Scott – was for the design of Biscovey church in Cornwall. In 1849 he set up in practice in an office of his own. Much of his earliest work, which included many church restorations, was in Cornwall.

== Career ==
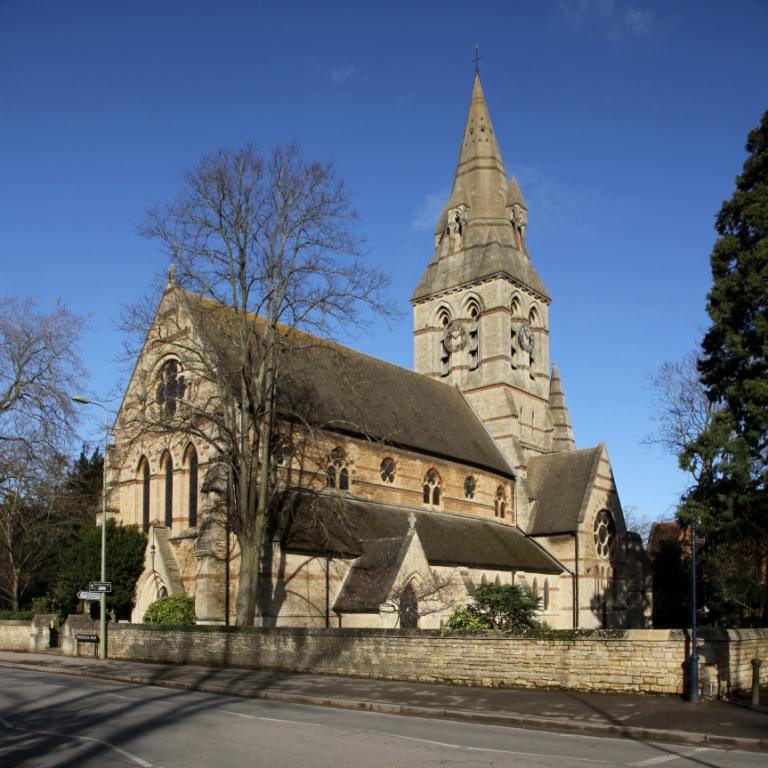
Former parish church of SS Philip and James in North Oxford, now the Oxford Centre for Mission Studies

In November 1850, having been appointed architect to the diocese of Oxford by Bishop Samuel Wilberforce, he left London, and moved to Wantage, where he had already designed a vicarage, and was working on some schools. In May 1852 he went to live in Beaumont Street, Oxford. He designed the parish church of SS Philip and James in the city, and another at Summertown, as well as restoring many others. Street built or restored 113 churches in the diocese of Oxford. However, his only work for the university was the reordering of Jesus College Chapel. His son Arthur Edmund Street suggested that:

Possibly my father's very decided adherence to the earlier phase of Gothic, and the eagerness with which he argued that Oxford already had enough of debased types, and should revert to the purity of the early forms, may have frightened the authorities.

During this period he developed his use of constructional polychromy, in churches such as All Saints, Boyne Hill. Maidenhead .

Early in his career, he advocated the idea that architects should have a practical involvement with the decoration of their buildings, and painted murals at Boyne Hill church himself. However, with his increasing amount of business, he soon realised the difficulties of such an approach. He remained in Oxford until late in 1855, when he moved back to London, taking a house in Montagu Place, Bloomsbury. At around this time he entered the competition to design the new cathedral at Lille, winning second prize, behind a design by Henry Clutton and William Burges. He came second to Burges in another competition, to design the Crimea Memorial Church in Constantinople, but eventually received the commission. He also submitted, unsuccessfully, Gothic schemes for the new Foreign Office in Whitehall, and for a projected rebuilding of the National Gallery.

=== Gothic Revival ===
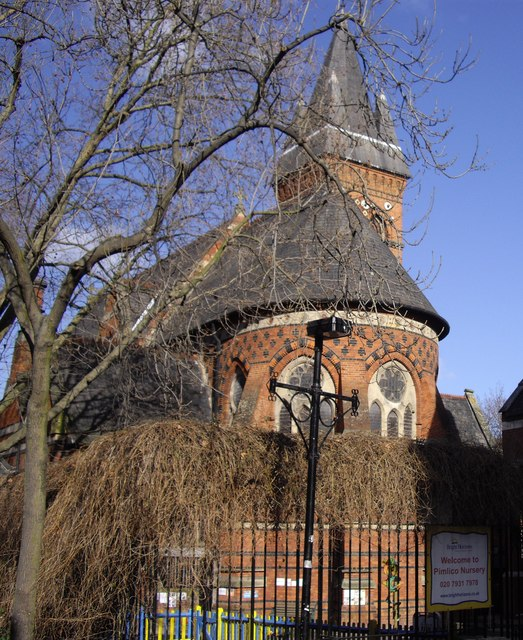
The church of St. James the Less, Westminster; completed to Street's design in 1861

Street was an active member of the Ecclesiological Society. From an early age he had been interested in the principles of Gothic architecture, and made frequent tours to study and draw Gothic architecture across Europe. He was an exceptional draughtsman, and in 1855 he published a very careful and well illustrated work on The Brick and Marble Architecture of Northern Italy, and in 1865 a book on The Gothic Architecture of Spain. These works inspired the wider use of constructional polychromy by British architects, sometimes mocked as "The Streaky Bacon Style".

At St James the Less, in Thorndike Street, Westminster (1858–61), Street used red brick, with black brick decoration both inside and out, and gave the church a tall, square campanile-like tower, its roof based on a Genoese model. Charles Locke Eastlake, writing in 1872, saw this as a prime example of the "revolt from [English] national style" that was occurring amongst Gothic Revival architects at this time, at least in part inspired by John Ruskin's enthusiasm for the medieval architecture of Northern Italy, and by the publication of Viollet-le-Duc's exhaustive Dictionnaire raisonné de l'Architecture Française du XIe au XVIe Siècle:

Here the whole character of the building, whether we regard its plan, its distinctive features, its external or internal decoration is eminently un-English. Even the materials used in its construction and the mode by which it is lighted were novelties. The detached tower with its picturesquely modelled spire, its belfry stage rich in ornamental brick-work and marble bosses, the semicircular apse and quasi-transepts, the plate tracery, the dormers inserted in the clerestory, the quaint treatment of the nave arcade, the bold vigour of the carving, the chromatic decoration of the roof—all bear evidence of a thirst for change which Mr. Street could satisfy without danger, but which betrayed many of his contemporaries into intemperance.

Two features Street was particularly fond of using were the round apse and the louvred belfry windows. Street was commissioned by Alexander Lindsay, 25th Earl of Crawford in 1867 to design several aspects of the extension work undertaken at Dunecht House, Aberdeenshire. These included the Library and a Chapel. In 1868 Street was made Diocesan Architect of Ripon, in addition to the similar posts which he already held in the dioceses of York and Oxford, and to which Winchester was subsequently added. He was also appointed Architect to York Minster at around this time, and, later on, to Salisbury and Carlisle Cathedrals.

== Works ==
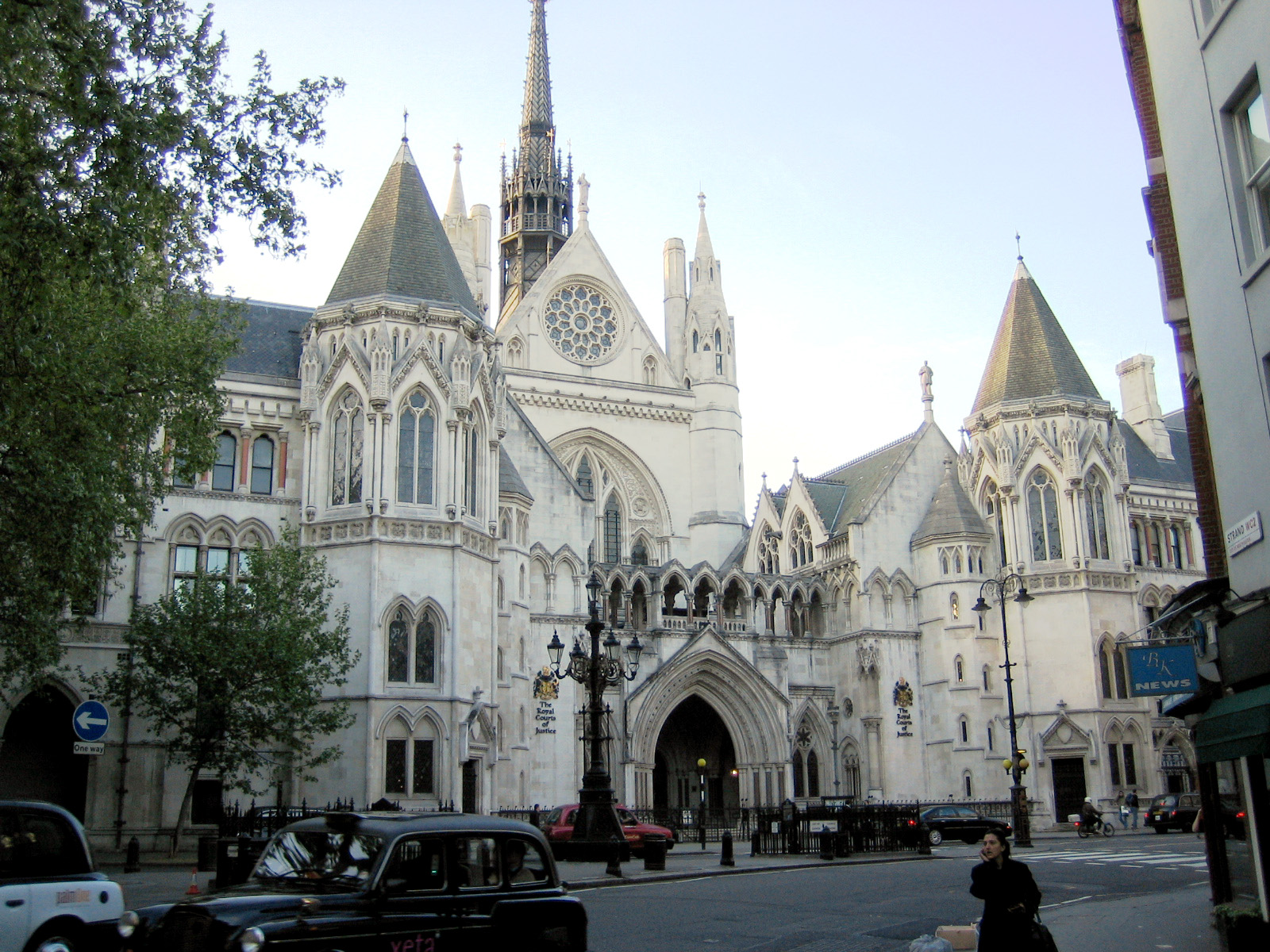
The Royal Courts of Justice in The Strand, London

Street's most recognisable building is probably the Law Courts (now the Royal Courts of Justice) in the Strand in London. The competition for this was prolonged, and much diversity of opinion was expressed. The judges wanted Street to make the exterior arrangements and Charles Barry the interior, while a special committee of lawyers recommended the designs of Alfred Waterhouse. In June 1868, however, Street was appointed sole architect; but the building was not complete at the time of his death in December 1881.

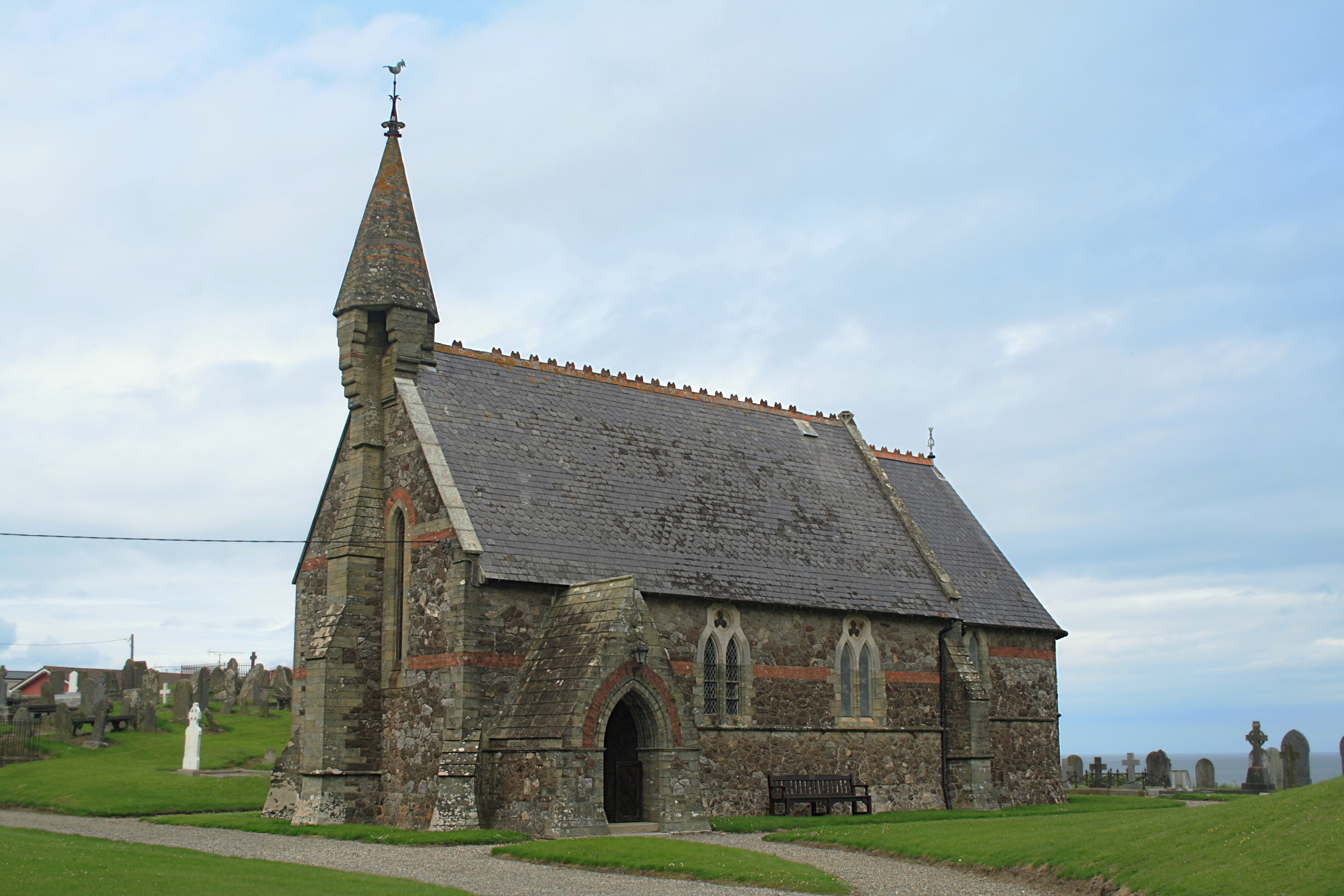
Church of St John the Evangelist, Ardamine, County Wexford

Apart from the Law Courts, by far the majority of Street's output was for ecclesiastical uses, the largest being the nave of Bristol Cathedral and the restoration of Christ Church Cathedral, Dublin. Chief amongst his complete works include St Margaret's convent, East Grinstead, and the theological college at Cuddesdon. Other churches of which he was the architect include All Saints' (Church of England), St Paul's Within The Walls (American Episcopal) in Rome, and, also for the American Episcopal Church, the American Cathedral in Paris, completed posthumously by Arthur E Street in 1886. His work was not exclusively in the Gothic Revival manner, as is demonstrated by Ralli's dramatic Lycian-Byzantine temple at Norwood Cemetery, the Romanesque reworking of the nearby church of St Luke and the rebuilding of All Saints' at Roydon, in West Norfolk, in a style to match its two Norman doorways. Street also designed the family chapel at Gwrych Castle in Abergele. Denbighshire.

=== Ireland ===
Street carried out a number of new works in Ireland, including the small clifftop church of St. John the Evangelist at Ardamine, Co. Wexford, and Piltown Church, Co. Kilkenny. His most significant work was the controversial re-edification of the historic Christ Church Cathedral, Dublin, in the course of which he was responsible for demolishing the choir which he considered to be of "no historic significance". Street designed the adjacent Synod Hall around the existing 12th-century St Michael's Church. He also restored St. Brigid's Cathedral, Kildare Town, which was a roofless ruin when he started work. The Cathedral reopened in 1896. He succeeded in rebuilding the lost walls to match the remnants which remained of the original walls and square tower.

== Societies and honours ==
Street was elected an associate of the Royal Academy in 1866, and a fellow in 1871; at the time of his death he was professor of architecture to the Royal Academy, where he had delivered a course of lectures on the development of medieval architecture. He was also president of the Royal Institute of British Architects. He was a member of the Royal Academy of Vienna, and in 1878, in reward for drawings sent to the Paris Exhibition, he was made a knight of the Legion of Honour.

== Pupils ==
In 1856–57, Philip Webb was Street's senior clerk and the young William Morris one of his apprentices. These two designers worked together on the Red House that became a memorial to William Morris's design principles and includes work by many of his now-famous friends. Another apprentice in the early 1870s was the Canadian architect Frank Darling.

== Personal life ==
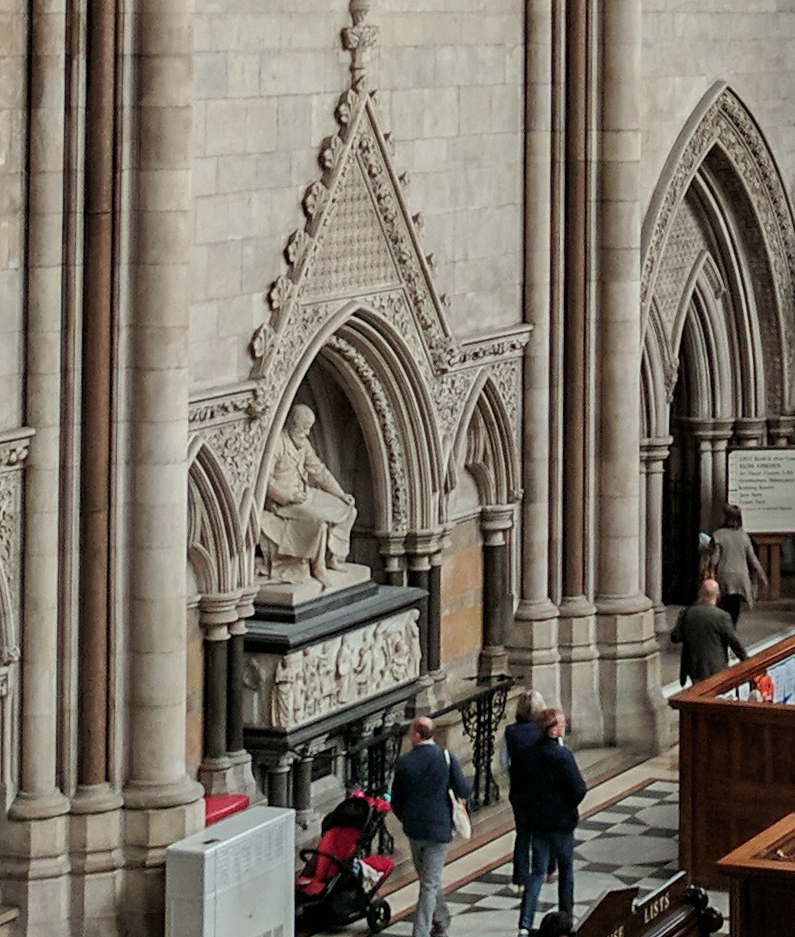
Monument to Street in the main hall of the Royal Courts of Justice

Street was twice married, first on 17 June 1852 to Mariquita Proctor, second daughter of Robert Proctor, who died in 1874 aged 44. They met when Street was employed to restore the Church of St James the Less in Hadleigh, Essex, where the rector was Mariquita's uncle. His second wife was Jessie Holland, second daughter of William Holland. They married on 11 January 1876, but she died eight weeks after the wedding, having contracted a fever on their honeymoon in Rome.

Street was an adherent of the high church tradition of the Church of England. He designed the Convent House for the Community of St Mary the Virgin in 1850 in Wantage. In 1847 Street had visited Edward Everard Blencowe, rector of West Walton in Norfolk, and met his sister Agnes Blencowe. Agnes and Street's sister, Mary Ann, later founded the Ladies' Ecclesiastical Embroidery Society in support of the Gothic Revival. The society promoted Street's designs, along with those of William Morris and George Frederick Bodley. Mary Ann and Agnes both joined the Wantage community as nuns. For many years Street was a churchwarden of All Saints, Margaret Street in London, built in the 1850s as a "model church" under the supervision of the Ecclesiological Society. He was particularly insistent that all seats in churches should be free of charge, rather than subject to pew rent.

Street's death, on 18 December 1881 aged 57, was hastened by overwork and professional worries connected with the building of the law courts. He was buried on 29 December in the nave of Westminster Abbey, adjacent to the tombs of Sir George Gilbert Scott and Sir Charles Barry. A monument to Street by Henry Hugh Armstead was sponsored by the Prince of Wales and Sir Frederic Leighton and is sited in the central hall of the Royal Courts; it was unveiled on 24 March 1886 by Lord Herschell, the Lord Chancellor. His son by his first wife, Arthur Edmund Street, was born in Oxford in 1855. He joined his father's office in 1878 and after his father's death completed the projects which were in the course of construction. He later wrote a biography of his father which was published in 1888.

== See also ==
- List of new churches by G. E. Street
- List of church restorations and alterations by G. E. Street
- List of domestic buildings by G. E. Street
- List of miscellaneous works by G. E. Street

== Sources ==
- Brownlee, David (1984). The Law Courts: The Architecture of George Edmund Street. Cambridge, MA: MIT Press.
- Davey, Peter (1995) [1980]. Arts and Crafts Architecture. Oxford: Phaidon Press. ISBN 0714837113.
- Eastlake, Charles Locke (1872). A History of the Gothic Revival. London: Longman, Green & Co.
- Historic Environment Scotland. "Dunecht House (Category A Listed Building LB3133)".
- Hitchcock, Henry-Russell (1977). Architecture: Nineteenth and Twentieth Centuries. The Pelican History of Art (4th (2nd integrated) ed.). Harmondsworth: Penguin Books. ISBN 0140561153.
- Savorra, M (May 2005). "George Edmund Street e i disegni di Brick and Marble". Il Disegno di Architettura (in Italian) (30): 39–47.
- Savorra, M (2006). "Città descritte, città illustrate. L'Italia nei disegni di George Edmund Street". In Iachello, E (ed.). I saperi della città (in Italian). Palermo: L'Epos. pp. 385–394.
- Street, Arthur Edmund (1888). Memoir of George Edmund Street, R.A., 1824–1881. London: John Murray.
- Street, George Edmund (1855). "St John's Church". Transactions of the Worcester Diocesan Architectural Society: 348. Archived from the original on 9 July 2015.
- Lopez-Ulloa, Fabian (2016). Las teorías del gótico y su representación gráfica en España el último tercio del siglo XIX. Un estudio sobre: Some Account of Gothic Architecture in Spain, de George Edmund Street (phd). E.T.S. Arquitectura (UPM). Archivo Digital UPM..
