= Sykes baronets =

Set index for Sykes baronets

There have been four baronetcies created for persons with the surname Sykes, two in the Baronetage of Great Britain and two in the Baronetage of the United Kingdom. As of 2026 three of the creations are extant.

- Sykes baronets of Basildon (1781)
- Sykes baronets of Sledmere (1783)
- Sykes baronets of Cheadle (1918): see Sir Alan John Sykes, 1st Baronet (1868–1950)
- Sykes baronets of Kingsknowes (1921)
