= List of United Kingdom locations: Lf-Litm =

The United Kingdom

This is part of the list of United Kingdom locations: a gazetteer of place names in the United Kingdom showing each place's locality and geographical coordinates.

== Lh ==
Location	Locality	Coordinates (links to map & photo sources)	OS grid reference
Lhanbryde	Moray	57.63°N 03.22°W	NJ2761

== Li ==
=== Lia–Lim ===
Location	Locality	Coordinates (links to map & photo sources)	OS grid reference
Lianamul	Western Isles	56.81°N 07.66°W	NL546836
Libanus	Powys	51.91°N 03.46°W	SN9925
Libberton	South Lanarkshire	55.67°N 03.62°W	NS9843
Libbery	Worcestershire	52.19°N 02.07°W	SO9555
Liberton	City of Edinburgh	55.90°N 03.16°W	NT2769
Liceasto	Western Isles	57.82°N 06.85°W	NG1292
Lichfield	Staffordshire	52.67°N 01.83°W	SK1109
Lickey	Worcestershire	52.37°N 02.01°W	SO9975
Lickey End	Worcestershire	52.34°N 02.04°W	SO9772
Lickfold	West Sussex	51.01°N 00.68°W	SU9225
Lickhill	Worcestershire	52.34°N 02.29°W	SO8072
Liddaton	Devon	50.61°N 04.19°W	SX4582
Liddeston	Pembrokeshire	51.71°N 05.05°W	SM8906
Liddington	Swindon	51.52°N 01.71°W	SU2081
Liden	Swindon	51.54°N 01.74°W	SU1883
Lidgate	Derbyshire	53.28°N 01.55°W	SK3077
Lidgate	Suffolk	52.18°N 00.51°E	TL7257
Lidget	Doncaster	53.49°N 01.02°W	SE6500
Lidget Green	Bradford	53.78°N 01.78°W	SE1432
Lidgett	Nottinghamshire	53.17°N 01.07°W	SK6265
Lidgett Park	Leeds	53.83°N 01.51°W	SE3238
Lidham Hill	East Sussex	50.91°N 00.61°E	TQ8416
Lidlington	Bedfordshire	52.04°N 00.57°W	SP9839
Lidsey	West Sussex	50.81°N 00.68°W	SU9303
Lidsing	Kent	51.32°N 00.55°E	TQ7862
Lidstone	Oxfordshire	51.91°N 01.49°W	SP3524
Liff	Angus	56.48°N 03.08°W	NO3333
Lifford	Birmingham	52.40°N 01.92°W	SP0579
Lifton	Devon	50.64°N 04.29°W	SX3885
Liftondown	Devon	50.64°N 04.32°W	SX3685
Lightcliffe	Calderdale	53.72°N 01.78°W	SE1425
Lighteach	Shropshire	52.90°N 02.68°W	SJ5434
Lightfoot Green	Lancashire	53.79°N 02.74°W	SD5133
Lighthorne	Warwickshire	52.19°N 01.51°W	SP3355
Lighthorne Heath	Warwickshire	52.19°N 01.48°W	SP3555
Lighthorne Rough	Warwickshire	52.19°N 01.53°W	SP3255
Lightmoor	Shropshire	52.64°N 02.48°W	SJ6705
Light Oaks	Staffordshire	53.04°N 02.12°W	SJ9250
Lightpill	Gloucestershire	51.72°N 02.23°W	SO8403
Lightwater	Surrey	51.34°N 00.68°W	SU9262
Lightwood	Derbyshire	53.33°N 01.44°W	SK3782
Lightwood (Ditton Priors)	Shropshire	52.51°N 02.53°W	SO6491
Lightwood (Hinstock)	Shropshire	52.85°N 02.46°W	SJ6929
Lightwood	Staffordshire	52.97°N 01.98°W	SK0142
Lightwood	City of Stoke-on-Trent	52.96°N 02.12°W	SJ9241
Lightwood Green	Cheshire	52.97°N 02.55°W	SJ6342
Lightwood Green	Wrexham	52.95°N 02.92°W	SJ3840
Lilbourne	Northamptonshire	52.37°N 01.17°W	SP5676
Lilford	Wigan	53.49°N 02.51°W	SD6600
Lillesdon	Somerset	51.00°N 02.99°W	ST3023
Lilleshall	Shropshire	52.73°N 02.40°W	SJ7315
Lilley	Berkshire	51.50°N 01.36°W	SU4479
Lilley	Hertfordshire	51.92°N 00.38°W	TL1126
Lilliesleaf	Scottish Borders	55.51°N 02.74°W	NT5325
Lillingstone Dayrell	Buckinghamshire	52.04°N 00.98°W	SP7039
Lillingstone Lovell	Buckinghamshire	52.05°N 00.96°W	SP7140
Lillington	Dorset	50.90°N 02.54°W	ST6212
Lillington	Warwickshire	52.30°N 01.53°W	SP3267
Lilliput	Poole	50.70°N 01.94°W	SZ0489
Lilstock	Somerset	51.18°N 03.20°W	ST1644
Lilybank	Inverclyde	55.92°N 04.72°W	NS3074
Lilyhurst	Shropshire	52.71°N 02.38°W	SJ7413
Lilyvale	Kent	51.11°N 00.97°E	TR0839
Limbrick	Lancashire	53.63°N 02.60°W	SD6016
Limbury	Luton	51.90°N 00.46°W	TL0624
Limebrook	Herefordshire	52.28°N 02.92°W	SO3766
Limefield	Bury	53.60°N 02.30°W	SD8012
Limehillock	Moray	57.55°N 02.82°W	NJ5152
Limehouse	Tower Hamlets	51.51°N 00.04°W	TQ3681
Limehurst	Tameside	53.49°N 02.10°W	SD9300
Limekilnburn	South Lanarkshire	55.72°N 04.07°W	NS7050
Limekiln Field	Derbyshire	53.23°N 01.29°W	SK4771
Limekilns	Fife	56.03°N 03.49°W	NT0783
Limerigg	North Lanarkshire	55.90°N 03.84°W	NS8570
Limerstone	Isle of Wight	50.63°N 01.37°W	SZ4482
Lime Side	Oldham	53.51°N 02.13°W	SD9102
Limestone Brae	Northumberland	54.83°N 02.32°W	NY7949
Lime Street	Gloucestershire	51.96°N 02.27°W	SO8130
Lime Tree Park	Coventry	52.39°N 01.57°W	SP2978
Limington	Somerset	50.99°N 02.65°W	ST5422
Limpenhoe	Norfolk	52.57°N 01.52°E	TG3903
Limpenhoe Hill	Norfolk	52.56°N 01.53°E	TG4002
Limpers Hill	Wiltshire	51.07°N 02.25°W	ST8231
Limpley Stoke	Wiltshire	51.33°N 02.31°W	ST7860
Limpsfield	Surrey	51.25°N 00.01°W	TQ3953
Limpsfield Chart	Surrey	51.24°N 00.03°E	TQ4251
Limpsfield Common	Surrey	51.24°N 00.01°E	TQ4152

=== Lin ===
Location	Locality	Coordinates (links to map & photo sources)	OS grid reference
Linbriggs	Northumberland	55.34°N 02.17°W	NT8906
Linburn	West Lothian	55.89°N 03.40°W	NT1268
Linby	Nottinghamshire	53.05°N 01.21°W	SK5351
Linchmere	West Sussex	51.07°N 00.77°W	SU8631
Lincluden	Dumfries and Galloway	55.07°N 03.63°W	NX9677
Lincoln	Lincolnshire	53.22°N 00.54°W	SK9771
Lincomb	Worcestershire	52.31°N 02.26°W	SO8268
Lincombe	Devon	51.19°N 04.16°W	SS4946
Lindale	Cumbria	54.21°N 02.90°W	SD4180
Lindal-in-Furness	Cumbria	54.16°N 03.15°W	SD2575
Lindean	Scottish Borders	55.57°N 02.81°W	NT4931
Linden	Gloucestershire	51.84°N 02.26°W	SO8216
Lindfield	West Sussex	51.00°N 00.09°W	TQ3425
Lindford	Hampshire	51.11°N 00.85°W	SU8036
Lindley	Kirklees	53.65°N 01.83°W	SE1118
Lindley	North Yorkshire	53.93°N 01.66°W	SE2249
Lindores	Fife	56.33°N 03.19°W	NO2616
Lindow End	Cheshire	53.29°N 02.28°W	SJ8178
Lindrick Dale	Rotherham	53.33°N 01.19°W	SK5482
Lindridge	Worcestershire	52.31°N 02.48°W	SO6769
Lindsell	Essex	51.91°N 00.38°E	TL6427
Lindsey	Suffolk	52.05°N 00.87°E	TL9744
Lindsey Tye	Suffolk	52.06°N 00.88°E	TL9845
Lindwell	Calderdale	53.68°N 01.86°W	SE0921
Lineholt	Worcestershire	52.29°N 02.26°W	SO8266
Lineholt Common	Worcestershire	52.30°N 02.26°W	SO8267
Liney	Somerset	51.11°N 02.93°W	ST3535
Linfitts	Oldham	53.56°N 02.04°W	SD9708
Linford	Essex	51.48°N 00.40°E	TQ6779
Linford	Hampshire	50.85°N 01.74°W	SU1806
Linga (Bluemull Sound)	Shetland Islands	60.66°N 00.98°W	HU556983
Linga (Busta Voe)	Shetland Islands	60.35°N 01.36°W	HU352637
Linga (Scalloway Islands)	Shetland Islands	60.14°N 01.35°W	HU361396
Linga (Vaila Sound)	Shetland Islands	60.21°N 01.57°W	HU236478
Linga (Yell Sound)	Shetland Islands	60.44°N 01.15°W	HU465732
Linga Holm	Orkney Islands	59.13°N 02.67°W	HY616273
Lingarabay	Western Isles	57.75°N 06.94°W	NG0685
Lingarabay Island	Western Isles	57.75°N 06.93°W	NG066844
Lingards Wood	Kirklees	53.60°N 01.91°W	SE0612
Lingay / Lingeigh (Barra)	Western Isles	56.87°N 07.57°W	NL603898
Lingay (Fiaray)	Western Isles	57.08°N 07.36°W	NF754115
Lingay (Killegray)	Western Isles	57.70°N 07.01°W	NG012789
Lingay / Lingeigh (North Uist)	Western Isles	57.68°N 07.25°W	NF870781
Lingay (Wiay)	Western Isles	57.38°N 07.22°W	NF859448
Lingbob	Bradford	53.81°N 01.86°W	SE0935
Lingdale	Redcar and Cleveland	54.53°N 00.98°W	NZ6616
Lingen	Herefordshire	52.29°N 02.94°W	SO3667
Lingfield	Darlington	54.52°N 01.52°W	NZ3114
Lingfield	Surrey	51.16°N 00.02°W	TQ3843
Lingfield Common	Surrey	51.17°N 00.02°W	TQ3844
Lingley Green	St Helens	53.39°N 02.67°W	SJ5589
Lingwood	Norfolk	52.61°N 01.48°E	TG3608
Linhope	Northumberland	55.43°N 02.06°W	NT9616
Linhope	Scottish Borders	55.29°N 02.94°W	NT4001
Linicro	Highland	57.61°N 06.37°W	NG3967
Link	North Somerset	51.32°N 02.76°W	ST4759
Linkend	Worcestershire	51.97°N 02.24°W	SO8331
Linkenholt	Hampshire	51.32°N 01.48°W	SU3658
Linkhill	Kent	51.02°N 00.57°E	TQ8128
Linkinhorne	Cornwall	50.53°N 04.38°W	SX3173
Linklater	Orkney Islands	58.76°N 02.95°W	ND4587
Linklet	Orkney Islands	59.37°N 02.42°W	HY7654
Linksness	Orkney Islands	58.97°N 02.81°W	HY5310
Linktown	Fife	56.09°N 03.17°W	NT2790
Linley (Barrow)	Shropshire	52.57°N 02.47°W	SO6898
Linley (More)	Shropshire	52.52°N 02.95°W	SO3592
Linley Brook	Shropshire	52.57°N 02.47°W	SO6897
Linleygreen	Shropshire	52.57°N 02.47°W	SO6898
Linley Green	Herefordshire	52.17°N 02.45°W	SO6953
Linlithgow	West Lothian	55.96°N 03.60°W	NT0076
Linlithgow Bridge	Falkirk	55.97°N 03.63°W	NS9877
Linney Head	Pembrokeshire	51.62°N 05.05°W	SR885962
Linnie	Highland	57.52°N 04.35°W	NH5951
Linns	Angus	56.81°N 03.32°W	NO1970
Linnyshaw	Salford	53.52°N 02.39°W	SD7403
Linshader	Western Isles	58.18°N 06.74°W	NB2131
Linsidemore	Highland	57.95°N 04.46°W	NH5499
Linslade	Bedfordshire	51.91°N 00.67°W	SP9125
Linstock	Cumbria	54.91°N 02.90°W	NY4258
Linthorpe	Middlesbrough	54.55°N 01.25°W	NZ4818
Linthurst	Worcestershire	52.34°N 02.01°W	SO9972
Linthwaite	Kirklees	53.62°N 01.85°W	SE1014
Lintmill	Moray	57.67°N 02.82°W	NJ5165
Linton	Cambridgeshire	52.09°N 00.27°E	TL5646
Linton	Derbyshire	52.74°N 01.60°W	SK2716
Linton	Herefordshire	51.92°N 02.49°W	SO6625
Linton	Kent	51.21°N 00.50°E	TQ7549
Linton	Leeds	53.90°N 01.42°W	SE3846
Linton	North Yorkshire	54.05°N 02.01°W	SD9962
Linton	Northumberland	55.21°N 01.59°W	NZ2691
Linton Heath	Derbyshire	52.74°N 01.58°W	SK2816
Linton Hill	Herefordshire	51.91°N 02.49°W	SO6624
Linton-on-Ouse	North Yorkshire	54.03°N 01.25°W	SE4960
Lintridge	Gloucestershire	51.98°N 02.38°W	SO7432
Lintz	Durham	54.89°N 01.75°W	NZ1656
Lintzford	Durham	54.90°N 01.78°W	NZ1457
Lintzgarth	Durham	54.77°N 02.12°W	NY9242
Linwood	Hampshire	50.88°N 01.74°W	SU1809
Linwood	Lincolnshire	53.35°N 00.34°W	TF1086
Linwood	Renfrewshire	55.84°N 04.49°W	NS4464

=== Lio–Lis ===
Location	Locality	Coordinates (links to map & photo sources)	OS grid reference
Lionacleit	Western Isles	57.41°N 07.36°W	NF7849
Lionacuidhe	Western Isles	57.38°N 07.41°W	NF7546
Lionel (or Lìonal)	Western Isles	58.48°N 06.24°W	NB5363
Lions Green	East Sussex	50.94°N 00.20°E	TQ5518
Liphook	Hampshire	51.07°N 00.80°W	SU8431
Lipley	Shropshire	52.87°N 02.40°W	SJ7331
Lippitts Hill	Essex	51.64°N 00.01°E	TQ3996
Lipyeate	Somerset	51.24°N 02.47°W	ST6750
Liquo (Bowhousebog)	North Lanarkshire	55.80°N 03.83°W	NS8558
Lisburn	Co. Antrim, Co. Down	54.51°N 06.03°W	J275644
Liscard	Wirral	53.42°N 03.05°W	SJ3092
Liskeard	Cornwall	50.44°N 04.46°W	SX2564
Lismore	Argyll and Bute	56.50°N 05.50°W	NM842403
Liss	Hampshire	51.03°N 00.88°W	SU7827
Lissett	East Riding of Yorkshire	54.00°N 00.26°W	TA1458
Liss Forest	Hampshire	51.04°N 00.88°W	SU7828
Lissington	Lincolnshire	53.33°N 00.34°W	TF1083
Lisson Grove	City of Westminster	51.52°N 00.17°W	TQ2782
Listerdale	Rotherham	53.41°N 01.30°W	SK4691
Listock	Somerset	51.00°N 02.97°W	ST3223
Listoft	Lincolnshire	53.22°N 00.26°E	TF5172
Liston	Essex	52.06°N 00.69°E	TL8544
Liston Gardens	Essex	52.07°N 00.68°E	TL8445
Lisvane	Cardiff	51.54°N 03.18°W	ST1883
Lliswerry / Liswerry	City of Newport	51.57°N 02.95°W	ST3487

=== Lit ===
==== Lita–Litm ====
Location	Locality	Coordinates (links to map & photo sources)	OS grid reference
Litcham	Norfolk	52.71°N 00.78°E	TF8817
Litchard	Bridgend	51.51°N 03.58°W	SS9081
Litchborough	Northamptonshire	52.18°N 01.07°W	SP6354
Litchfield	Hampshire	51.27°N 01.34°W	SU4653
Litchurch	City of Derby	52.91°N 01.46°W	SK3635
Litherland	Sefton	53.47°N 03.01°W	SJ3398
Litlington	Cambridgeshire	52.06°N 00.09°W	TL3142
Litlington	East Sussex	50.78°N 00.15°E	TQ5201
Litmarsh	Herefordshire	52.13°N 02.70°W	SO5249
