= Lightwood =

Lightwood may refer to:

== Trees ==
- Acacia implexa, Australian tree
- Fatwood, the resinous core of the pine tree, in the Southern United States

== Places ==
=== United Kingdom ===
- Lightwood, Stoke-on-Trent, Staffordshire
- Lightwood, Derbyshire
- Lightwood, Ditton Priors, Shropshire
- Lightwood, Hinstock, Shropshire
- Lightwood, Staffordshire Moorlands, Staffordshire
- Lightwood Reservoir, in Derbyshire

=== United States ===
- Lightwood, Alabama, United States, a place in Elmore County
- Lightwood House, plantation house in Virginia

== People with the name ==
- Ray Lightwood (1922–2001), British medical engineer
- Reginald Cyril Lightwood, writing in 1935, namesake of Lightwood–Albright syndrome
- Simon Lightwood (born 1979/1980), British politician

=== Fictional characters ===
- Alec Lightwood and Isabelle Lightwood, from The Mortal Instruments novels by Cassandra Clare
- Maryse, Max and Robert Lightwood, secondary characters from the same novels

== Other uses ==
- Lightwood, 1939 novel by Brainard Cheney
- Lightwood's law, in paediatric medicine
- Lightwood Hoard, found near Lightwood, Stoke-on-Trent
