= Listed buildings in Sheriffhales =

Sheriffhales is a civil parish in Shropshire, England. It contains 32 listed buildings that are recorded in the National Heritage List for England. Of these, two are listed at Grade II*, the middle of the three grades, and the others are at Grade II, the lowest grade. The parish contains the villages of Sheriffhales and Chadwell and smaller settlements, and is otherwise mainly rural. In the parish is Lilleshall Hall, a country house, later a National Sports Centre. This is listed, together with associated structures. Most of the other listed buildings are houses, cottages, farmhouses and farm buildings, the earliest of which are timber framed or have timber-framed cores. The remainder of the listed buildings include a church, items in the churchyard, a wayside cross, a milestone and a milepost, a watermill, and a war memorial.

== Key ==
| Grade | Criteria |
|---|---|
| II* | Particularly important buildings of more than special interest |
| II | Buildings of national importance and special interest |

== Buildings ==
| Name and location | Photograph | Date | Notes | Grade |
|---|---|---|---|---|
| St Mary's Church; 52.70542°N 2.35954°W | | 12th century | The chancel dates from the 13th century, the north aisle was added in the 14th century, the tower in 1723, and the church was restored in 1884. It is built in stone, the east nave wall is rendered, and the roof is tiled. The church consists of a nave, a north aisle, a chancel, and a west tower. The tower has three stages, a chamfered embattled parapet, and a clock face in the top stage on the east side. Inside is a double-hammerbeam roof. | II* |
| Cross base and sundial 52.70564°N 2.35915°W | — | Medieval | The cross base and sundial are in the churchyard of St Mary's Church, the sundial dating from the 18th century. The structure is in stone and has an octagonal step, a moulded circular base, and a tapered circular shaft. | II |
| Wayside cross 52.72180°N 2.34911°W | | Medieval | The cross is in stone and consists of an octagonal shaft on a chamfered octagonal base with an octagonal step. | II |
| The Old House; 52.70501°N 2.35845°W | — | c. 1500 | The house was later extended and partly refaced. The original part is timber framed with brick infill, the extension and refacing are in brick, and the roof is tiled. The house has an L-shaped plan, with a hall range of 3½ bays and a gabled projecting two-bay cross-wing. The windows are casements, and there is a large half-dormer containing an oriel window with a moulded bressumer. | II |
| Sheene House; 52.70610°N 2.35885°W | — | Late 16th century | A timber framed house that was refaced in brick in the 19th century, and has a tile roof with stepped parapeted gable ends. There is one storey and an attic, and five bays. The doorway has a gabled porch and a rectangular fanlight. To the left are cross-windows with segmental heads, to the right are casement windows, and there are four gabled eaves dormers. | II |
| Sheriffhales Manor; 52.70600°N 2.36166°W | | Late 16th century | The house was altered in the 17th century, and considerably restored in about 1952. It is timber framed with rendered infill panels, much applied timber framing, and a tile roof. The house has two storeys and an attic, and an irregular cruciform plan. There are four bays to the left, a projecting four-bay gabled cross-wing, three bays to the right, and a two-storey gabled porch. The porch and the cross-wing have jettied upper floors, and the gables have bargeboards and pierced finials. Some windows are mullioned and transomed, and others are cross-windows. | II |
| Village Farmhouse; 52.70957°N 2.35609°W | — | Late 16th century | The farmhouse was later extended. The early part is timber framed with brick infill, the extensions are in brick with a dentilled eaves cornice and weatherboarding, and the roof is tiled. There are two storeys, a T-shaped plan consisting of a two-bay range, a three-bay cross-wing, and a later extension in the angle. The windows are casements, and there is a flat-roofed porch. | II |
| 85 Heath Hill; 52.72385°N 2.34906°W | — | Early 17th century | The cottage was later altered and extended. The early part is timber framed with brick infill, the extensions are in brick, and the roof is tiled. There is one storey and an attic, a front of three bays, and a later single-storey extension on the left. The windows are casements, there is a raking eaves dormer, and a gabled porch. | II |
| Byre and Hayloft, Court Farm; 52.72469°N 2.32208°W | — | 17th century | The farm buildings were altered and extended in the 19th century. The early parts are timber framed with red brick infill on a plinth, there is partial refacing, rebuilding and extensions in red brick, and a tile roof. There are two storeys, and three bays and extensions. Most of the windows are casements, there are some sash windows, loft doors, and doorways, many with segmental heads. | II |
| Fallows; 52.70571°N 2.35850°W | — | 17th century | A cottage that was later altered and extended, it is timber framed with brick infill, partial refacing in brick, and a tile roof. There is one storey and an attic, two bays, and a single storey extension on the right. The doorway has a segmental head, the windows are casements, and there are gabled eaves dormers. | II |
| Grange Farmhouse; 52.72598°N 2.32090°W | — | 17th century | A timber framed farmhouse on a stone plinth, refaced and extended in red brick, with bands, a dentilled eaves cornice, and a tile roof. It has an L-shaped plan, with a front range of two storeys and an attic and three bays, and a rear wing of two storeys and two bays. The central doorway has a rectangular fanlight, the windows are sashes, and there are three gabled eaves dormers. | II |
| Hilton Bank Farmhouse; 52.71558°N 2.35198°W | — | 17th century | The farmhouse was refaced and extended in the 19th century. The early part is in rendered timber framing, the refacing and extension is in brick, and the roof is tiled. The house has an irregular U-shaped plan with a central range and two projecting gabled wings. The left wing has two storeys and an attic and two bays, and the right wing has one storey and an attic. The windows are sashes, and there is a gabled half-dormer. | II |
| Court Farmhouse; 52.72488°N 2.32247°W | — | Late 18th century | The farmhouse was extended in the 19th century. It is in red brick on a stone plinth, with stone dressings, a string course, quoins, and a tile roof. There are three storeys and a basement, two bays, and a two-storey, one-bay extension recessed to the right. The house has two mullioned basement windows, the other windows being sashes. | II |
| Gorser Tomb; 52.70504°N 2.35928°W | — | Late 18th century | The tomb is in the churchyard of St Mary's Church, and is to the memory of members of the Gorser family. It is in stone and has a circular plan, with a wide base, a moulded plinth, a fluted frieze, a dentilled cornice, and a hemispherical top. | II |
| Milestone at NGR SJ7837310905; 52.69540°N 2.32165°W | | Late 18th century | The milestone is on the north side of the A5 road. It is in stone, and has a rectangular section and a segmental top. The milestone is inscribed with the distance in miles to "SALOP" (Shrewsbury). | II |
| Glover Tomb; 52.70524°N 2.35924°W | — | c. 1804 | The tomb is in the churchyard of St Mary's Church, and is to the memory of Robert Glover. It is a chest tomb in stone, and has fluted corner pilasters, semicircular panelled sides, raised oval ends, and a moulded top. | II |
| Atwell Park Farmhouse; 52.71188°N 2.36276°W | — | 1820 | The farmhouse is in red brick on a plinth, with a dentilled eaves cornice and a tile roof. There are two storeys and an attic, an L-shaped plan, and a front of three bays. Steps lead up to a central doorway that has pilasters and a rectangular fanlight, and the windows are sashes. To the rear is a 19th-century pump. | II |
| Glover Tomb; 52.70530°N 2.35935°W | — | Early 19th century | The tomb is in the churchyard of St Mary's Church, and is to the memory of a member of the Glover family. It is a chest tomb in stone, and has fluted corner pilasters, semicircular panelled sides, raised oval ends, and a moulded top. | II |
| Lilleshall Hall; 52.72721°N 2.37376°W | | 1826–30 | A country house, later a National Sports Centre, it was designed by Jeffry Wyatville in Tudor style. The house is built in limestone and sandstone with slate roofs, and has a square plan with two storeys, a basement and an attic, and a two-storey service wing. The main block has a moulded plinth, a coped parapet with corner pinnacles, and gables with finials. The windows are mullioned and transomed with hood moulds. In the centre is a projecting porch tower with 3½ storeys, octagonal corner buttresses, string courses, and parapeted gables with corner pinnacles and finials. | II* |
| Hughes Tomb; 52.70519°N 2.35920°W | — | c. 1827 | The tomb is in the churchyard of St Mary's Church, and is to the memory of Robert Hughes. It is a chest tomb in stone, and has a chamfered base and top, fluted corner pilasters, and panelled sides and ends. | II |
| Archway, Lilleshall Hall; 52.72745°N 2.37389°W | — | c. 1829 | The archway was designed by Jeffry Wyatville in Tudor style. It is in limestone, and consists of a four-centred arch flanked by gabled buttresses. The arch has moulded coping, and a central gable with a finial. | II |
| Terrace, loggia, and orangery, Lilleshall Hall; 52.72745°N 2.37389°W | — | c. 1829 | The garden features were designed by Jeffry Wyatville in Italianate style. The terrace has an L-shaped plan with an arcaded balustrade, and beneath it is a twelve-bay loggia with a sundial. The orangery has one storey and three bays. | II |
| Gatehouse, Lilleshall Hall; 52.72765°N 2.37270°W | — | c. 1829–32 | The gatehouse was designed by Jeffry Wyatville in Tudor style, and is in sandstone with slate roofs. It has two storeys and an attic, and 1½ storey wings. In the centre is a round-headed carriage arch over which is an oriel window. Flanking the arch to the east are two large stone lions, and to the west are two cast iron eagles. | II |
| Former stable block, Lilleshall Hall; 52.72801°N 2.37289°W | — | c. 1829–32 | The stable block, which has been converted into a gymnasium, was designed by Jeffry Wyatville in Tudor style. It is in sandstone on a plinth, with buttresses, and slate roofs that have coped parapeted gable ends with obelisk finials. There are 1½ storeys, and an irregular polygonal plan with projecting gabled wings. Most of the windows are mullioned or mullioned and transomed with hood moulds, and there are gabled eaves dormers. To the north is a walled entrance court that has two square gate piers with globe finials. | II |
| York Tomb; 52.70546°N 2.35985°W | — | c. 1830 | The tomb is in the churchyard of St Mary's Church, and is to the memory of Rachel York and her husband. It is a chest tomb in stone, and has a square plan. The tomb has a moulded base, a cornice, a faceted top, and incised borders. | II |
| Middle Heath Lodge; 52.72804°N 2.35799°W | — | 1835 | An estate lodge designed by Charles Barry in Tudor style, it is in sandstone on a plinth, and has a tile roof. There is one storey and an attic, and a T-shaped plan. On the front is a gabled porch with a four-centred arch, above which is a carved lion. The porch is flanked by mullioned and transomed windows, on the right in a square bay window with a cornice. In each gable end is a cross-window and a mullioned window above, the gables have bargeboards and shaped finials, and on the front is a gabled dormer. | II |
| Chadwell Mill; 52.72803°N 2.31742°W | — | Mid 19th century | The watermill is in red brick with a dentilled eaves cornice and a tile roof. There are two storeys and a garret, and a single-storey shed recessed to the left. The mill contains windows, doorways, and a wheel opening, all with segmental heads. Inside is an overshot wheel. | II |
| Milepost at SJ7847012578; 52.71042°N 2.32014°W | — | Mid 19th century | The milepost is on the southwest side of the B5314 road. It is in cast iron, and has a triangular section, a chamfered top, and raised edges. The milepost is inscribed with the distances in miles to Newport and to Ivetsey Bank. | II |
| Sheriffhales Lodge; 52.70539°N 2.36023°W | | Late 19th century | The estate lodge is timber framed with some applied timber and rendered infill panels, on a stone plinth, and with a tile roof. There is one storey and an attic, a T-shaped plan, and a front of three bays. In the centre is a projecting porch, above which is a gabled dormer with open bargeboards, a finial and a pendant. In the outer bays are four-light casement windows. | II |
| Balustrade, fountain and retaining walls to pools, Lilleshall Hall; 52.72723°N 2.37522°W | — | c. 1900 | The structures are in the Italian Garden that contains a central octagonal pool and four square surrounding pools. In the middle of the octagonal pool is a fountain in the form of a stone figure. The balustrade is also in stone and has shaped balusters, a square end, intermediate piers with urn finials, and eight steps leading down from it. | II |
| Eyecatcher, Lilleshall Hall; 52.72517°N 2.37263°W | — | c. 1900 | The eyecatcher is in the form of a Neoclssical belvedere in Corinthian style. It is in sandstone with a tile roof, and has a square plan with sides of one bay. The columns support an entablature with arches that have festoons on the spandrels, moulded imposts, and plinths. The building has a saucer dome and a mosaic floor. | II |
| Screen, Lilleshall Hall; 52.72775°N 2.37905°W | — | c. 1900 | The screen in the grounds of the hall consists of a loggia in sandstone with a concealed roof. It is in Corinthian style, and consists of detached columns with an entablature surmounted by urns. In each bay is a saucer dome. | II |
| War memorial 52.70466°N 2.35951°W | — | c. 1920 | The war memorial is in the churchyard of St Mary's Church, and consists of a sandstone cross and base. The base has three steps, two are octagonal and there is a square one above, the shaft is octagonal and tapering, and the cross has octagonal arms. On the steps are inscriptions and the names of those lost in the two World Wars. | II |
