= Brabourne Lees =

Village in Kent, England

Coordinates: 51°7′26″N 0°58′20″E

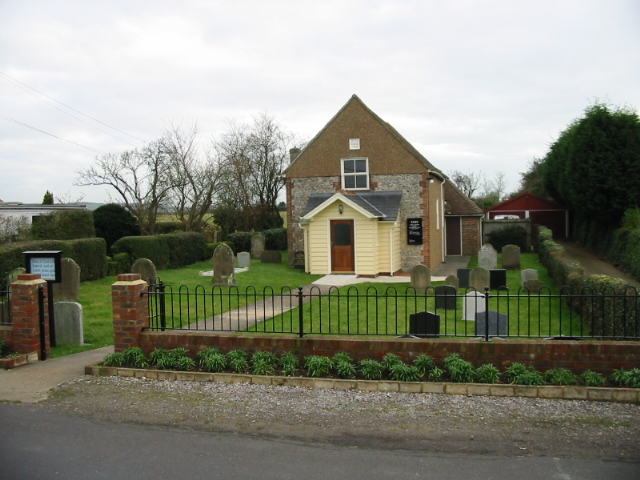
- Zion Strict Baptist Chapel

- Location within Kent
- Area: 0.8628 km^{2} (0.3331 sq mi)
- Population: 1,480 (2021 census)
  - Density: 1,715/km^{2} (4,440/sq mi)
- OS grid reference: TR085405
- Civil parish: Brabourne
- District: Ashford
- Shire county: Kent
- Region: South East
- Country: England
- Sovereign state: United Kingdom
- Post town: ASHFORD
- Postcode district: TN25
- Dialling code: 01303
- Police: Kent
- Fire: Kent
- Ambulance: South East Coast
- UK Parliament: Ashford

Brabourne Lees is a village in the civil parish of Brabourne, within the Ashford borough of Kent, England. The village (centre) is just under 5 miles (8 km) east of Ashford town centre itself geographically. By road this is a journey of about 6 miles (10 km). In 2021 it had a population of 1480.

The village was built on former pasture land ("lees") at the foot of the North Downs. Brabourne Baptist Church is at the junction of Calland and Plain Road; there is also a Zion Strict Baptist Chapel to the northeast of the village, on Canterbury Road.

== See also ==
- Smeeth - village immediately to the south
- Lilyvale, Kent - hamlet to the east
