= Sheriffhales =

Village in Shropshire, England

Coordinates: 52.708°N 2.356°W

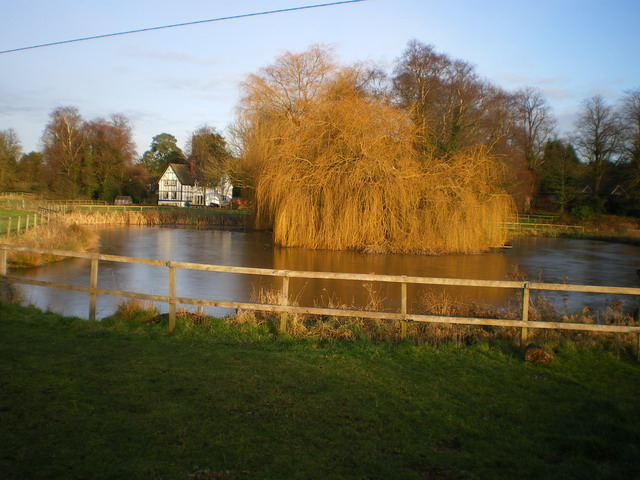
- Pool at Sheriffhales, and lodge of Sherriffhales Manor

- Location within Shropshire
- Population: 722 (2011)
- OS grid reference: SJ759123
- Civil parish: Sheriffhales
- Unitary authority: Shropshire
- Ceremonial county: Shropshire
- Region: West Midlands
- Country: England
- Sovereign state: United Kingdom
- Post town: SHIFNAL
- Postcode district: TF11
- Dialling code: 01952
- Police: West Mercia
- Fire: Shropshire
- Ambulance: West Midlands
- UK Parliament: The Wrekin

Sheriffhales is a scattered village in Shropshire, England, 4 miles (6.4 km) north-east of Telford, 3 miles (4.8 km) north of Shifnal and 4 miles (6.4 km) south of Newport. The name derives from Halh (Anglican) and scīr-rēfa (Old English) which is a combination of Hales (a nook of land, small valley) and Sheriff (a king's executive). At the time of the Domesday Book, it was held by Roger de Balliol the Sheriff of Shropshire.

As well as Sheriffhales itself, the modern civil parish of Sheriffhales includes the smaller settlements of Lilyhurst, Burlington, Heath Hill, Weston Heath, Redhill and Chadwell. The parish has a population of about 700 people, however it reached 1019 people in 1850, when the Duke of Sutherland owned most of it. The village was in Staffordshire until 1895 when the border between Staffordshire and Shropshire was moved. The population of the civil parish at the 2011 census was 722.

Despite being a small village of around 100 people, there is a primary school, St Mary's Church, Sheriffhales, a Church of England place of worship and a local post office, as well as a playing field with football goals and a children's playground. The church is a Grade II listed building that dates back to the 12th century.

Between 1663 and 1697, when its founder moved to London, Sheriffhales was home to a dissenting academy run by nonconformist minister John Woodhouse.

Sheriffhales was the site of the World War II PoW Camp 71, located along the drive to Lilleshall Hall. The camp was intended for Italian Prisoners of War and housed up to 2,000 until Italy surrendered in 1943; thereafter it was used to house German PoW's until 1948 when most were repatriated.

The 2007 Tour of Britain bike race passed through the village on the first of September as part of the Wolverhampton to Birmingham stage.

The main farm within the village, Manor Farm, was a predominantly dairy farm, but has been subsequently converted into an arable farm. It is also the centre for a point to point yard.

Sheriffhales is mentioned (under the name "Hales") in the Ellis Peters novel The Confession of Brother Haluin.

Hope Vere Anderson is Lord of the Manor of Sheriffhales and descends from the senior branch of the Hope Vere's of Lesmahagow, Scotland. The Hope Vere's trace their ancestry to Roger De Vere who was Lord of the Manor of Hales and when he became Sheriff of Shropshire in the 16th century he changed the name of his Manor from that of Hales to Sheriffhales to reflect his importance in being appointed to this additional role.

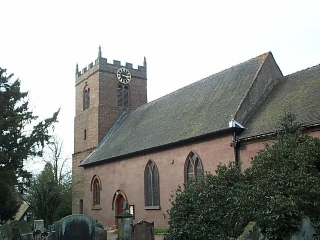
St Mary's Church

== See also ==
- Listed buildings in Sheriffhales
