= Chadwell, Shropshire =

Hamlet in Shropshire, England

Coordinates: 52.725°N 2.322°W

Chadwell
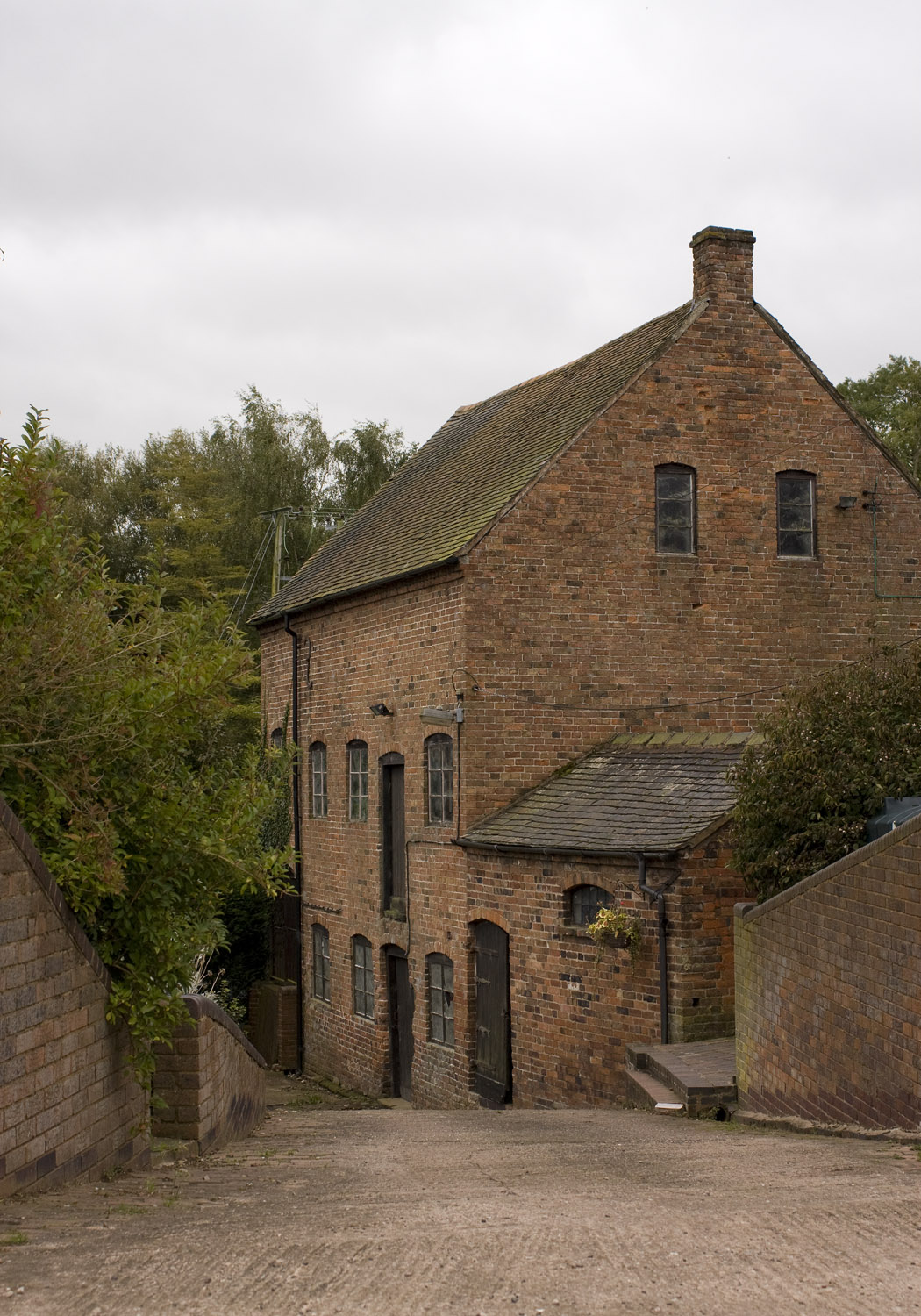
- Some of the buildings of Chadwell water mill

- Location within Shropshire
- OS grid reference: SJ782142
- Civil parish: Sheriffhales
- Unitary authority: Shropshire
- Ceremonial county: Shropshire
- Region: West Midlands
- Country: England
- Sovereign state: United Kingdom
- Post town: NEWPORT
- Postcode district: TF10
- Dialling code: 01952
- Police: West Mercia
- Fire: Shropshire
- Ambulance: West Midlands
- UK Parliament: The Wrekin

Chadwell is a hamlet in the county of Shropshire, England. It lies 1/2 mile west of the village of Great Chatwell over the Staffordshire border and comprises a number of red brick buildings including a converted water mill. The name derives either from the Old English for 'the cold spring' or from St. Chad's well, which can be found in the hamlet. The hamlet falls within the civil parish of Sheriffhales.

== St. Chad's Well ==
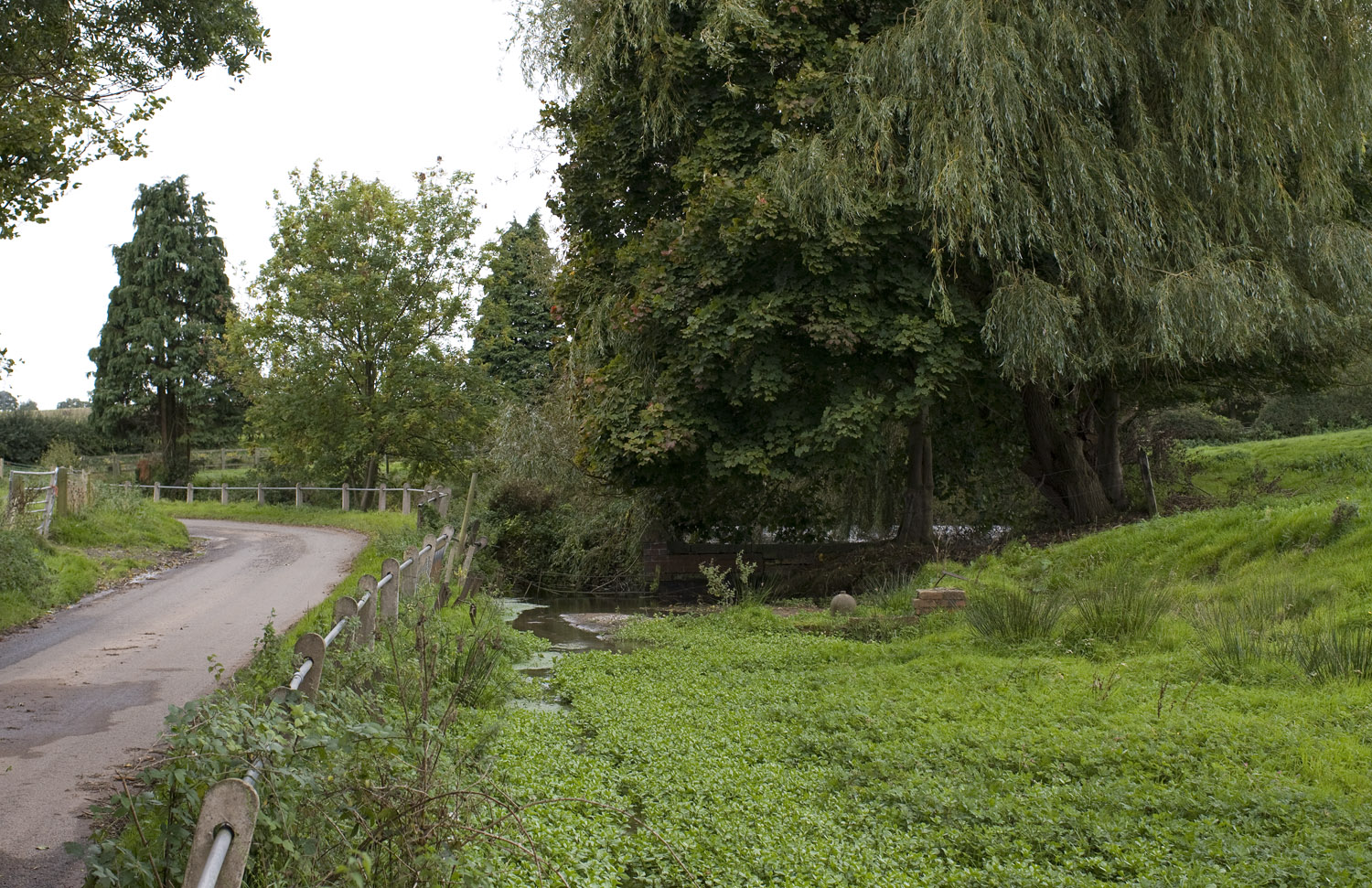
View south-west from the mill pond to the small pond.

St. Chad's well is located at the end of the mill pond, furthest from the mill buildings (grid reference SJ786143). The spring itself appears to originate in the small, clear pond on the other side of the road and the water reaches the mill pond by three entries; two of these are natural (or old) and one, with the greatest flow, was constructed recently. They can be found on either side of a small wooden bridge.

R.C. Hope describes the well as being 'approached by old stone steps' and comments that 'the water ... is of very good quality and highly thought of for tea-making'; Michael Raven refers to a 'circular, stone walled structure'. The remains of a sandstone construction are visible near the entries but are much disturbed.

According to tradition the well was consecrated by St. Chad.

== See also ==
- Listed buildings in Sheriffhales
