= Lilleshall Hall =

Country house in Sheriffhales, Shropshire, England

Coordinates: 52.728°N 2.374°W

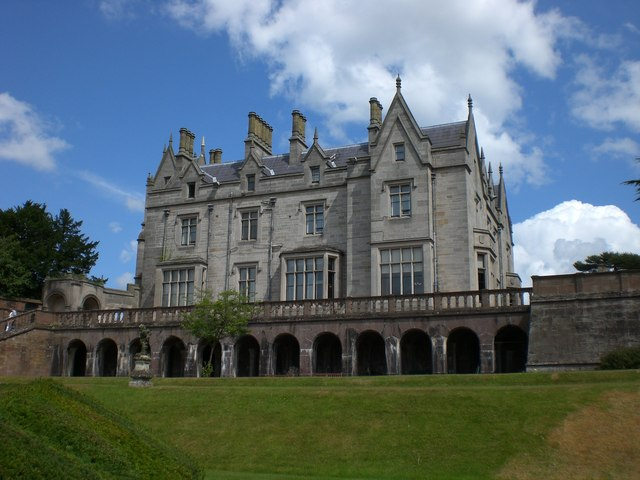
- Lilleshall Hall viewed from the south
- Location: Lilleshall, Shropshire, England, United Kingdom

Lilleshall Hall /lɪl.ʃɔːl/ is a large former country house and estate at Sheriffhales, Shropshire, England.

It is run by Serco Leisure Operating Ltd on behalf of Sport England as one of three National Sports Centres, alongside Bisham Abbey and Plas y Brenin. It lies between Telford and Newport.

== History ==
=== Early history ===
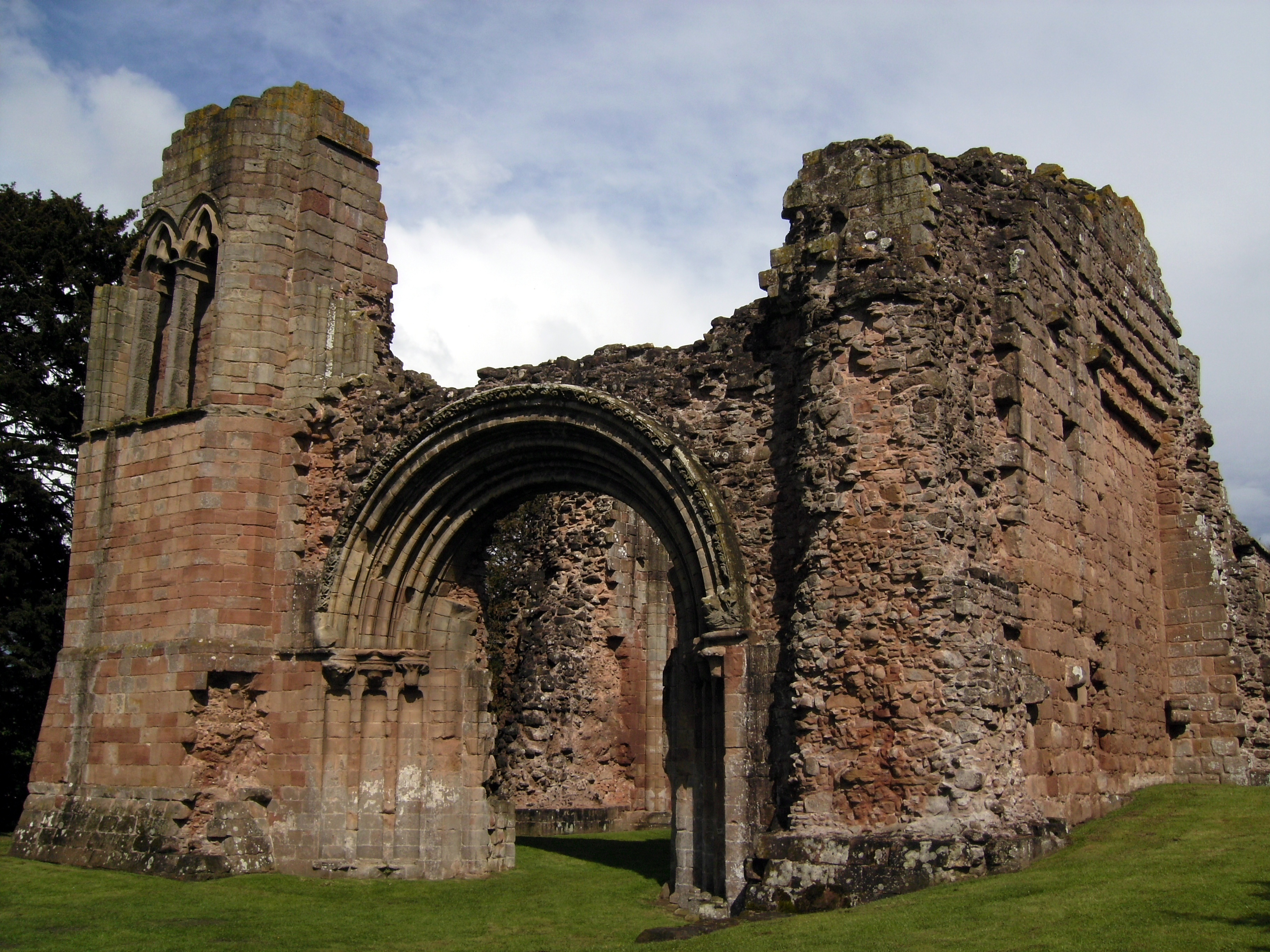
Ruins of the abbey: the west end of the abbey church.

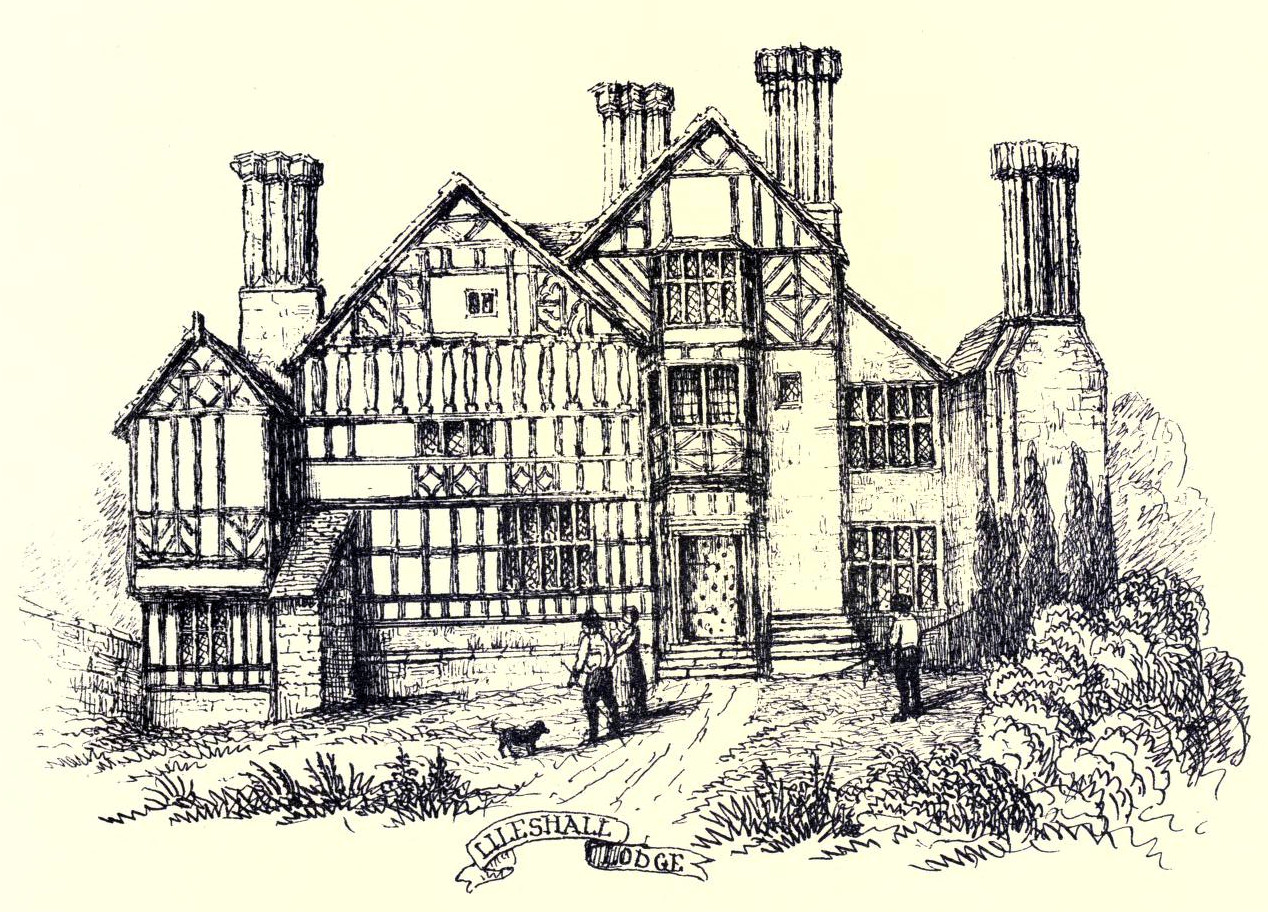
Lodge at Lilleshall Abbey, home of the Leveson family after the Dissolution of the Monasteries.

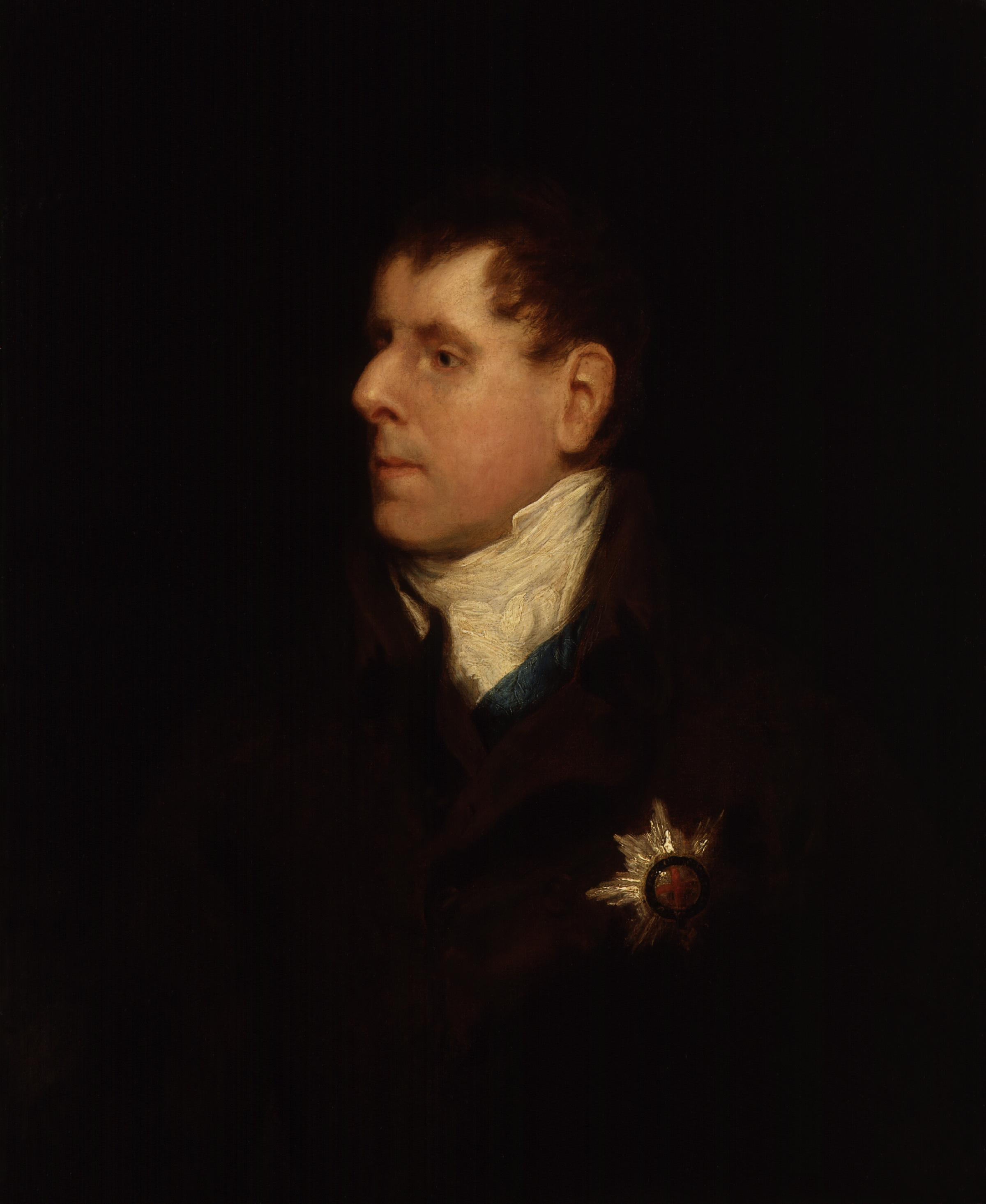
The 1st Duke of Sutherland, under whom the present Hall was built.

The core of the Lilleshall estate, which amounts to 30,000 acres (120 km^{2}), was originally the demesne of Lilleshall Abbey, an Augustinian foundation of the 12th century. The ruins of the original Lilleshall Abbey are protected today by English Heritage. The estate was granted after the Dissolution of the Monasteries to James Leveson, a Wolverhampton wool merchant, in 1539. His family, including Walter Leveson and Vice-Admiral Richard Leveson, the last of his direct line, lived in a lodge in the grounds, although they were only occasionally resident in Lilleshall, as they had many other houses. The estates passed to Richard Leveson, a distant cousin who was a prominent Royalist in the English Civil War and fortified the Abbey, inviting a severe bombardment. As he too failed to produce heirs, Lilleshall then passed to Sir William Leveson-Gower, 4th Baronet, founder of an illustrious political dynasty, who married Lady Jane Granville, daughter of the Earl of Bath.

The first of the family to be ennobled, in 1703, was John Leveson-Gower, 1st Baron Gower. His son and grandson, John Leveson-Gower, 1st Earl Gower, and Granville Leveson-Gower, 1st Marquess of Stafford, progressed further up the ranks of the English peerage and it was probably the latter who converted a 17th-century house, in the village of Lilleshall itself, into a country residence in the late 1750s. The lodge lingered on, in a deteriorating state, until 1818, when it was demolished.

George Granville Leveson-Gower after his marriage in 1785, considered even the mid-18th century Hall too small but it was not until the 1820s that his wife, in her own right Countess of Sutherland, instructed the architect Jeffry Wyatville and local builders to commence work on the present Hall. It was constructed beyond the eastern end of the original estate, in the parish of Sheriffhales, although still called Lilleshall Hall. It was completed in 1829, three years before the newly elevated Duke of Sutherland's death. The Hall was scheduled in 1984 as a Grade II* listed building. The former Lilleshall Hall, in the village, was at first retained by the family, probably as a dower house, before being sold in 1930.

The approach to the estate from the main Wolverhampton to Chester Road is through the "Golden Gates", an exact replica of those adorning Buckingham Palace. The gardens include many bridges, the original canal, an ornamental garden, a Grecian temple, ponds and the Apple Walk (about half its original pergola length). The 70-foot (21 m) high obelisk was built in 1833 in memory of the 1st Duke of Sutherland and designed by G.E. Hamilton.

=== Sir John Leigh ===
Sir John Leigh. Newspaper photograph c. 1922.

In 1914, a year after the 5th Duke succeeded to the seat at the age of 25, he decided on the outbreak of the First World War that it was unwise to have so much of his riches tied up in land and property. He sold the entire estate except the Hall and 50 acres (200,000 m^{2}) of gardens, with less than 100 acres (0.40 km^{2}) being purchased by Wrekin College. He then decided he wanted to live closer to London and sold the remainder of the estate in 1917 to Sir John Leigh.

Leigh had come into a fortune on his father's death in 1916, as both a landowner and a mill owner based in Oldham, with large estates and factories in Lancashire and Cheshire. He made a donation of £50,000 towards treatment for disabled soldiers and, possibly as a consequence, was made a baronet in the New Year Honours for 1918. Leigh established his summer home at Lilleshall Hall and a London home at 6 Carlton House Terrace, one of the most prestigious addresses in the capital. In late 1920 Leigh was rumoured to be seeking a safe Conservative or Unionist seat to become an MP. In May 1922 he was slipped, unopposed, into the previously Conservative seat of Clapham. The Lilleshall purchase brought the traditional landowners' privilege of advowson: Leigh held three local livings Lilleshall, Sheriffhales and Donington. However, with so many new interests, his involvement in his country seat and its surroundings soon waned.

=== Herbert Ford ===
Herbert Ford (1893-1963) was a wealthy local man, added to by his marriage to Marjorie Perrins, daughter of Walter Perrins of Birmingham. In 1927 he bought the estate. An application for an alcohol licence met with fierce opposition from the local community and police, but most vehemently the local clergy, both Anglican and nonconformist, headed by the vicar of Sheriffhales, Robbie Abney Giles. However, a good lawyer successfully steered the application through a hearing before the Newport magistrates. From 1930 until 1939, the Hall had pleasure gardens open for the public, including an amusement park, a narrow gauge railway, tea dances, and children's playgrounds. He added an additional nine holes on the existing nine-hole golf course, designed by the noted golf course architect, Harry Colt, which later became the Lilleshall Hall Golf Club. However, it was not played on for 20 years owing to a rent dispute with farmers that resulted in cattle on the course. He even increased attendance by advertising that the German airship Hindenburg would fly over the estate even when its route was nowhere near; he explained that the lack of an airship was due to bad weather in a self-sent telegram.

=== Second World War ===
At the outbreak of the Second World War the pleasure gardens closed, an air raid bunker was built and wooden classrooms erected. This accommodated both Cheltenham Ladies' College and later Dr Barnardo's charity, who used the facilities as an orphanage. The land and gardens were intensively farmed throughout this period.

=== After World War II ===
Many estates were left in ruin after World War II and Lilleshall was no exception. Repairing them to pre-World War II state was expensive and the social revolution that had occurred meant they were very much more expensive to run. Mr Ford struggled on but in 1949, the Central Council of Physical Recreation were seeking a second National Recreation Centre to serve the North of England to complement Bisham Abbey in the South.

In 1949, a sale was agreed for £30,000 for the Hall and 10 acres (40,000 m^{2}), made possible by a financial gift from the people of South Africa to Clement Attlee's government. Mr Ford then gave another 10 acres (40,000 m^{2}) on condition he and his family could stay in residence for at least another ten years or until his death.

The sports centre was opened in 1951 by Queen Elizabeth II (then the Princess Elizabeth). Jim Lane, a member of the Marylebone Cricket Club became the first warden. He started a number of cricketing courses and the first Conference of cricket coaches was held there in December 1951. Annual summer schools were held from July until September for the governing bodies of many major sports, including cricket, archery, athletics, fencing, judo, weightlifting, basketball, soccer, netball, and tennis.

In 1974 the centre was handed to the Sports Council by the Central Council of Physical Recreation.

== Sports centre ==
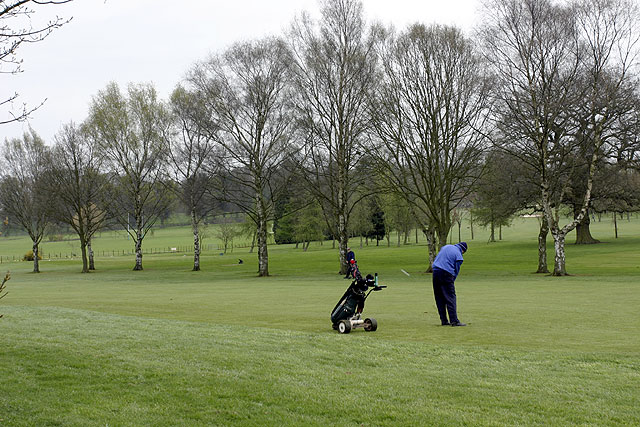
Lilleshall Hall Golf Course

Following the success of the summer schools, sports' governing bodies came to look upon Lilleshall as their own national and regional coaching or squad training centre. In twenty-one years as a National Recreation Centre, the English governing bodies of cricket, Rugby League and Rugby Union, lawn tennis, badminton, hockey, lacrosse, netball, the Professional Golfing Association and Association Football selected Lilleshall for its facilities and convenience for players meeting up from around the country to train:

- The 10-acre (40,000 m^{2}) field purchased in 1949 was extended by a further 10 acres (40,000 m^{2}) and developed as a playing field. Prince Philip opened the Pavilion built with a grant from the South African charitable trust in November 1954
- Originally a gymnasium, movement and dance studio, King George VI Sports Hall was a 120-foot (37 m) square multi-purpose hall. Funded by a grant of £56,000 from the King George VI memorial foundation, it opened on 31 October 1955
- During the 1950s and early 1960s, a new hall of residence was built. It was refurbished in the 1990s to provide ensuite accommodation
- The 1966 England team trained for two weeks prior to their success in World Cup of 1966. Sir Alf Ramsey returned in 1967
- Funded by B.A.G.A, a pitted area for gymnastics was added in 1979
- The Sutherland Hall, with the opening of the National Centre at Crystal Palace becoming the principal athletics facility, was converted in 1983 for cricket, archery and indoor bowls
- In 1985 the King George Hall and the pitted area became the permanent home for British gymnastics
- In 1986 the Football Association took over the gymnasium for use as the International Sports Medicine Institute and Rehabilitation Centre
- Wenlock Hall was opened in 1986, a multi-purpose sports facility, incorporating the William Morgan Development Centre for International Volleyball. The Hall was named after the town of Much Wenlock, where it is believed the idea of the modern day Olympic Games was conceived and where the Wenlock Games are still held annually to this day
- The UK's first Human Performance Centre opened in 1988
- Ford Hall, originally a stable block and then converted by Henry Hall into a ballroom, is now used for table tennis and martial arts

The centre also possesses:

- 10-acre (40,000 m^{2}) floodlit playing field
- Six-lane flat green bowling green
- Two floodlit water-based artificial grass pitches, one is a hockey pitch with the Olympic surface used in Beijing and London 2012, the other a multi-sports pitch.
- A state of the art outdoor archery range
- Five squash courts (two glass backed)

== The Football Association ==
The Football Association's School of Excellence was established at Lilleshall in 1984 and closed in the summer of 1999. During the mid-1980s to mid-1990s the England Team often trained at the centre, however, today most Premiership football clubs have now established their own centres of excellence based on the Lilleshall model. The school came in for some criticism due to its centralist and perceived anti-club agenda but its star pupils included future England internationals Jermain Defoe, Michael Ball, Michael Owen, Joe Cole, Scott Parker, Sol Campbell, Jamie Carragher, Wes Brown, Nick Barmby, Leon Osman, Andy Cole and Ian Walker.

== See also ==
- Grade II* listed buildings in Shropshire Council (H–Z)
- Listed buildings in Sheriffhales
