= Lidsing =

Hamlet in Kent, England

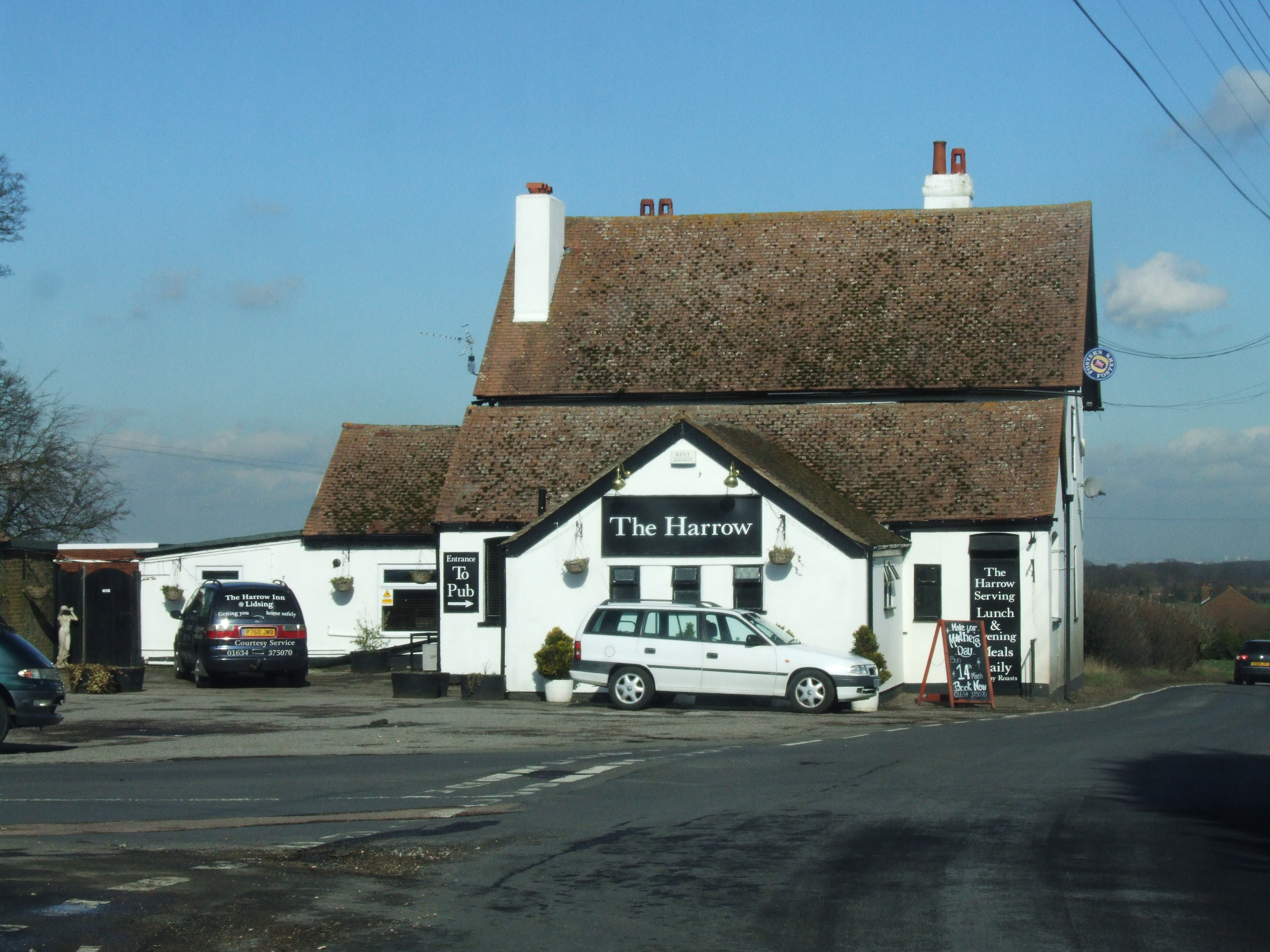
- The Harrow Pub, Lidsing

- Location within Kent
- Civil parish: Boxley
- District: Maidstone
- Shire county: Kent
- Region: South East
- Country: England
- Sovereign state: United Kingdom
- Post town: Gillingham
- Postcode district: ME7
- Police: Kent
- Fire: Kent
- Ambulance: South East Coast
- UK Parliament: Faversham and Mid Kent

Lidsing is a hamlet and former civil parish, now in the parish of Boxley, in the Maidstone district, in the county of Kent, England. It is near the M2 motorway and south of Gillingham, adjacent to Bredhurst. In 1911 the parish had a population of 98.

== History ==
Previously a manor/estate called Lydesinge partially in the parishes of Chatham and Gillingham, including part of the area that is now Hempstead, the district was the site of a chapel of ease, St. Mary Magdalene's, from the 12th Century. The chapel was demolished in the 1880s.

Lidsing was formerly a ville in Medway district, from 1866 Lidsing was a civil parish in its own right, on 1 October 1913 the parish was abolished and merged with Gillingham.
