= National Sports Centre (Sport England) =

National Sports Centres in England

There are three National Sports Centres as part of Sport England's strategy to create elite English world class sporting talent:

- Bisham Abbey
- Lilleshall
- Plas y Brenin

Each centre provides elite athletes with a range of specialist facilities, equipment, expertise and residential accommodation suitable for training and competition. The centres also offer full facilities for the general public including conferencing and banqueting, as well as beginners and improvers programmes in most of the activities that take place at each site.

Former centres were located at Crystal Palace and Holme Pierrepont.

== See also ==
- Sport in England
- St George's Park National Football Centre
