= Linsidemore =

Coordinates: 57.9582°N 4.4615°W

Linsidemore: Scottish Gaelic: Lianasaid Mhòr
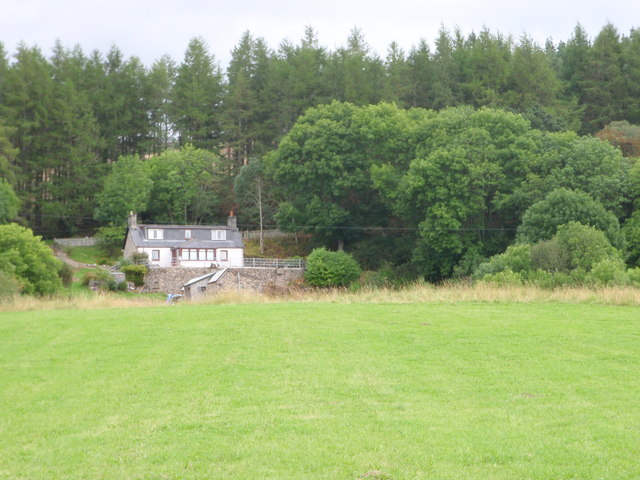
- A house in Linsidemore

- Location within the Sutherland area
- OS grid reference: NH547988
- Council area: Highland
- Lieutenancy area: Sutherland
- Country: Scotland
- Sovereign state: United Kingdom
- Post town: Lairg
- Postcode district: IV27 4
- Police: Scotland
- Fire: Scottish
- Ambulance: Scottish

Linsidemore (Scottish Gaelic: Lianasaid Mhòr) is a tiny township on the north bank of the Kyle of Sutherland in the Scottish Highlands. It is about 3 miles (5 km) northwest of Invershin and is in the Scottish council area of Highland.
