= Lilyhurst =

Hamlet in Shropshire, England

Coordinates: 52.717°N 2.372°W

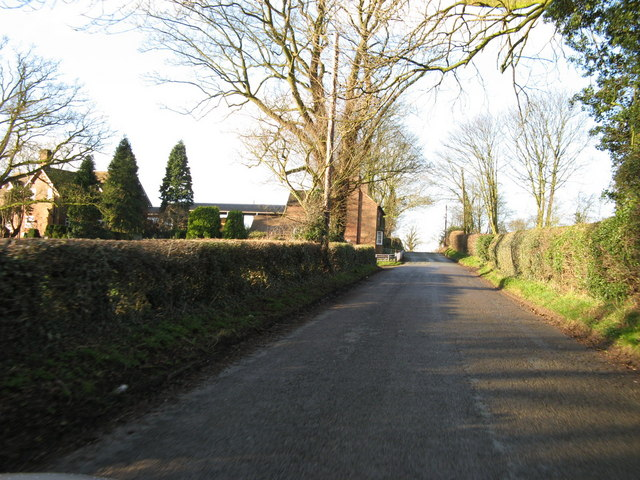
- Lilyhurst

- Location within Shropshire
- OS grid reference: SJ748133
- Civil parish: Sheriffhales
- Unitary authority: Shropshire
- Ceremonial county: Shropshire
- Region: West Midlands
- Country: England
- Sovereign state: United Kingdom
- Post town: SHIFNAL
- Postcode district: TF11
- Dialling code: 01952
- Police: West Mercia
- Fire: Shropshire
- Ambulance: West Midlands
- UK Parliament: The Wrekin

Lilyhurst is a small hamlet 4 miles (6.4 km) south of Newport near Lilleshall and Sheriffhales in Shropshire. It has a population of roughly 20 people. It is part of the parish of Sheriffhales and contains a small industrial estate, holistic centre and garden centre.
