= Lightwood's law =

Observation in medicine

Lightwood's law is the principle that, in medicine, bacterial infections will tend to localise while viral infections will tend to spread. This is based on the observation that while bacterial sepsis tends, despite affecting the whole body, to have a clear site of origin or 'focus', the opposite may be true of viral infections. There may be multiple sites across the body which are affected including dermatological manifestations, respiratory symptoms and gastrointestinal symptoms. It is named for Reginald Cyril Lightwood.

This principle is by no means infallible and in clinical practice a variety of diagnostic tests are used to distinguish between bacterial and viral infections.
