= Liddeston =

Village in Pembrokeshire, Wales

Coordinates: 51.717876°N 5.047767°W

- Location within Pembrokeshire
- OS grid reference: SM895068
- Community: Milford Haven
- Principal area: Pembrokeshire
- Preserved county: Dyfed
- Country: Wales
- Sovereign state: United Kingdom
- Post town: MILFORD HAVEN
- Postcode district: SA73
- Dialling code: 01646
- Police: Dyfed-Powys
- Fire: Mid and West Wales
- Ambulance: Welsh
- UK Parliament: Preseli Pembrokeshire
- Senedd Cymru – Welsh Parliament: Preseli Pembrokeshire

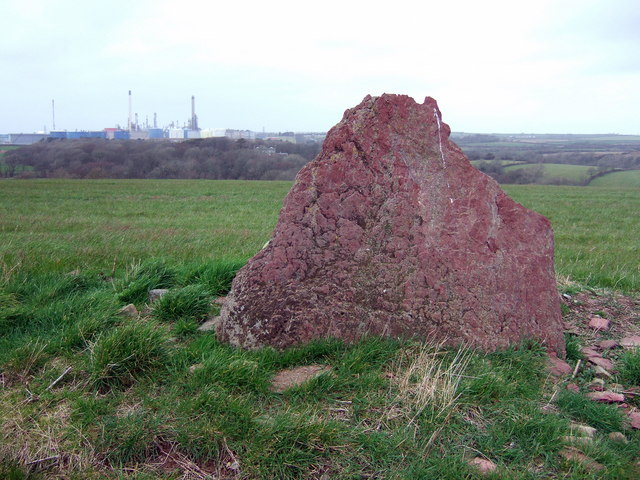
The Liddeston "Long" Stone with refinery in distance

Liddeston is a small coastal village in Pembrokeshire, Wales. It belongs to the Milford North ward of the community of Milford Haven in the historical hundred of Roose. It is located to the north of the town of Milford Haven and the village of Hubberston.

== History ==
The area that became Liddeston was originally a small hamlet or farm that was granted to the nearby Benedictine priory known as Pill Priory in the mid-thirteenth century. The original settlement was recorded as 'Lidden's township'. The settlement, along with the priory, was acquired in the 16th century by the Barlows of Slebech. It formed a main thoroughfare linking the hamlets of Lower Priory where the 12th century Pill Priory ruins are situated and Hubberston. Before the construction of Milford Docks, the waterway at Liddeston, known as Havens Head, provided shelter for vessels and processed unloaded lime. The opening of the docks meant that this trade ceased, and brought unemployment to the community.

To the northwest of Liddeston, on an exposed crest of a nearby hill, is the 'Long Stone', a standing stone. The Long Stone is of redstone, but little of it now remains.
