= Lingeigh, North Uist =

Uninhabited island off North Uist in Scotland

Lingeigh
Lingeigh (Gaelic)

Location
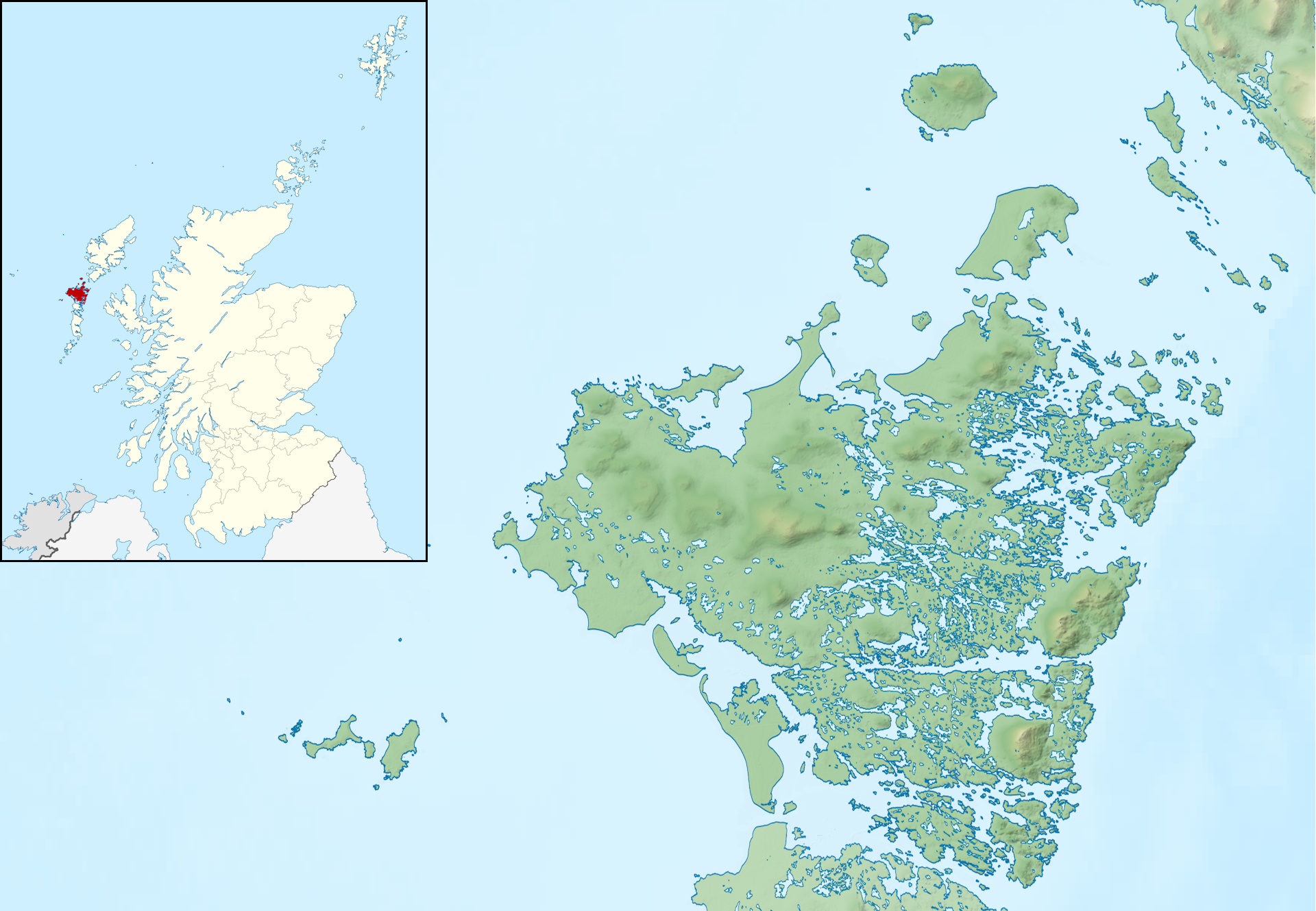
- Lingeigh shown next to North Uist Lingeigh shown within the Outer Hebrides
- OS grid reference: NF869783
- Coordinates: 57.68°N 7.254°W

Name
- Name meaning: heather island

Physical geography
- Island group: Uists and Barra
- Area: 42 hectares (0.16 sq mi)
- Highest elevation: 33 m (108 ft)

Administration
- Council area: Na h-Eileanan Siar
- Country: Scotland
- Sovereign state: United Kingdom

Demographics
- Population: 0
- Population rank: 216

Lingeigh is an uninhabited island off North Uist, south east of Boreray. It is separated from North Uist by Traigh Lingeigh.

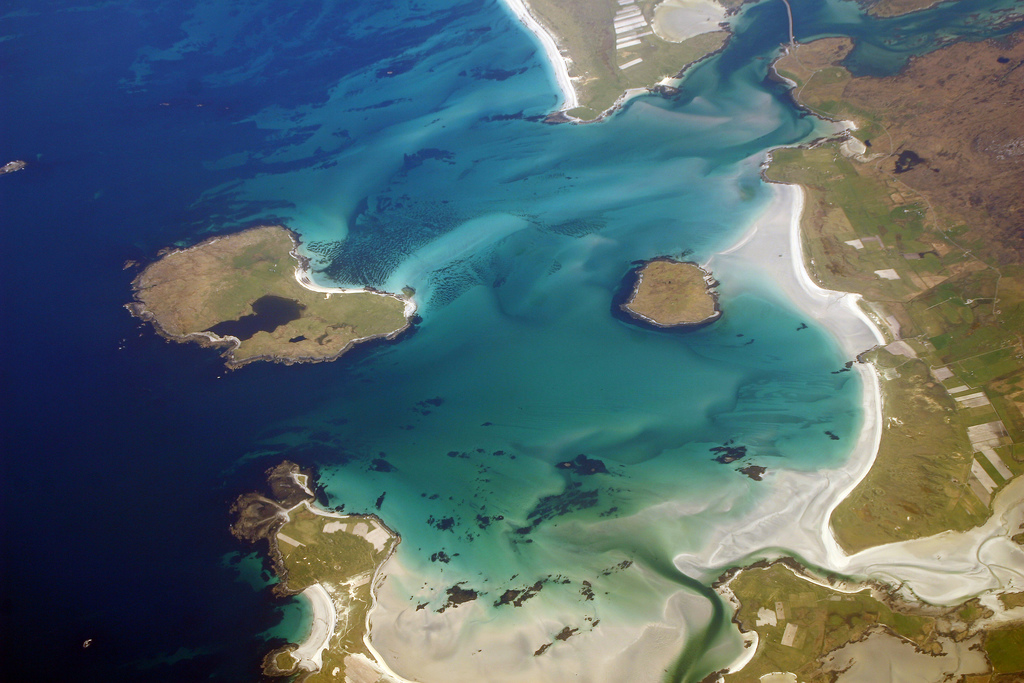
Aerial view of Lingeigh (centre), Boreray (left), and North Uist
