= Lightwood, Stoke-on-Trent =

Suburb in Stoke-on-Trent, England

Coordinates: 52.970°N 2.115°W

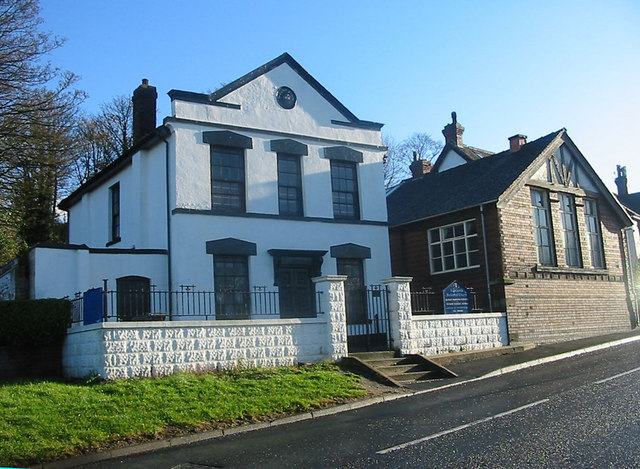
Lightwood Road Methodist Chapel

Lightwood is a suburb of Stoke-on-Trent, Staffordshire, England. It is located to the south of Longton, and Lightwood Road runs from here to Rough Close.

The area gives its name to the Lightwood Hoard, a substantial collection of Roman coins discovered buried in the garden of a house on Lightwood Road in 1960.

Though containing mostly private housing, the area includes a Methodist chapel constructed in 1816 which is a Grade II listed building.
