= Lilyvale, Kent =

Hamlet in Kent, England

Coordinates: 51.11763°N 0.98202°E

Lilyvale is a hamlet in the English county of Kent.

It is located north of the A20 road, south east of the town of Ashford, near the village of Smeeth.
