= Corinna zu Sayn-Wittgenstein-Sayn =

German businesswoman

- Born: Corinna Larsen; 28 January 1964 (age 62); Frankfurt, West Germany
- Occupation: Director of Apollonia Associates
- Known for: Relationship with Juan Carlos I, King of Spain
- Spouses: Philip Adkins (m. 1990; div. 1995) Prince Casimir zu Sayn-Wittgenstein-Sayn (m. 2000; div. 2005)
- Children: 2

Corinna zu Sayn-Wittgenstein-Sayn (née Larsen; born 28 January 1964) is a Danish-German entrepreneur.

== Early life ==
Corinna Larsen was born on 28 January 1964 in Frankfurt, West Germany to a German mother, Ingrid Sauer, and a Danish father, Finn Bønning Larsen. Her father, born in 1920 in Ballerup, Denmark, was the European director of Varig, the national airline of Brazil, from 1961 until 1991.

Larsen is a Danish national by right of birth. She was raised in Frankfurt, Rio de Janeiro, and Switzerland, and graduated from the University of Geneva in 1987.

== Career ==
Zu Sayn-Wittgenstein-Sayn began her career at L'Oréal before moving on to a public relations role at Compagnie Générale des Eaux.

=== Boss Sporting ===
From 2000 until 2006, zu Sayn-Wittgenstein-Sayn organized rare animal hunts at Boss Sporting, a subsidiary of the London-based gun-making firm Boss & Co. It was in this capacity that she was introduced to Juan Carlos I of Spain by Gerald Grosvenor, 6th Duke of Westminster in 2004. The King of Spain subsequently hired her to arrange the honeymoon of his son Felipe, Prince of Asturias and his new bride Princess Letizia. Between 2004 and 2005, the king hired her to organize two hunting safaris, including an elephant hunt at the Duke of Westminster's estate in Botswana in 2012.

=== Apollonia Associates ===
In 2006, zu Sayn-Wittgenstein-Sayn founded a consulting firm called Apollonia Associates that advises businesses and governments. She relocated to Monaco where she became an advisor to Princess Charlene. In 2013, Albert II, Prince of Monaco, appointed her as a global trade envoy for the principality. She is one of the people named in the Paradise Papers disclosure published in the German newspaper Süddeutsche Zeitung.

In 2012, approximately $65 million (€57 million) was allegedly transferred from an account to zu Sayn-Wittgenstein-Sayn. Zu Sayn-Wittgenstein-Sayn told investigators that the money was a donation from the former Spanish monarch, whom Swiss prosecutors name as the first beneficiary of the Mirabaud bank account. Zu Sayn-Wittgenstein-Sayn told investigators that the money paid for the refurbishment work at an Eaton Square apartment in London. These refurbishments cost around £4 million (€4,340,055).

In August 2020, zu Sayn-Wittgenstein-Sayn was part of an investigation regarding a Saudi rail deal during the late-2010s, and a series of financial transactions involving Juan Carlos I of Spain.

For many years zu Sayn-Wittgenstein-Sayn used several offshore companies to move the money around that she received from different sources in order to keep private the purchase of mansions and houses based in places thousands of miles from her residence. The creation of this complicated web of companies or trusts was to hide the name of the real owner of certain properties and accounts with money.

== Personal life ==
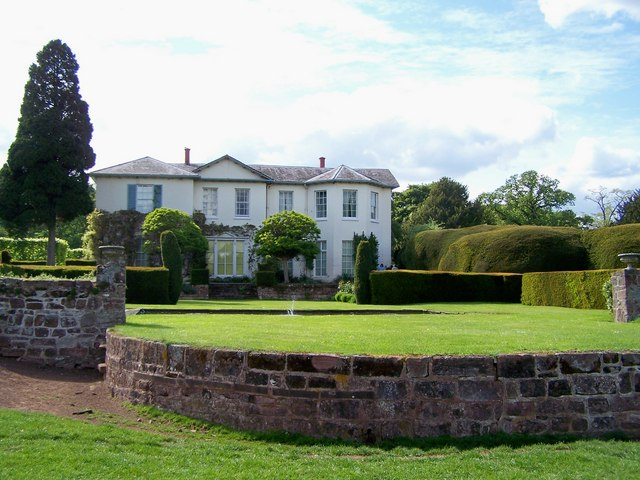
Chyknell Hall, Larsen's home in Claverley, England

In 1989, the then-Corinna Larsen met Philip Adkins, an American businessman based in the UK. They were married in 1990, and in 1992 they had a daughter, Anastasia. They were divorced in 1995. On 26 October 2000, she married Casimir, Prince zu Sayn-Wittgenstein-Sayn (a Princely House in Germany), twelve years her junior, in London. In 2002, she and Prince Casimir had a son, Prince Alexander Kyril. They divorced in 2005, but she retained her married name. In 2015, she purchased Chyknell Hall, an English listed building in Claverley, Shropshire, which had been listed for £7.5 million (equivalent to ￡10 million in 2024); she reportedly told Swiss prosecutors the purchase was for her 13-year-old son, and took up residence there.

=== Relationship with Juan Carlos I ===
It is alleged that zu Sayn-Wittgenstein-Sayn became the mistress of Spanish King Juan Carlos I in 2004. In April 2012, reports about her alleged relationship with the King gained significant media attention. In 2012 she arranged a safari in Botswana for the monarch, and accompanied him, a high-profile event that later attracted media and public scrutiny. The elephant-hunting trip she arranged cost €40,000, which was paid by Mohammed Eyad Kayali, advisor to the Saudi royal family, who like zu Sayn-Wittgenstein-Sayn, was named in the 2016 Panama Papers, as the head of 15 offshore companies. The King fell, breaking his hip and requiring emergency surgery, which brought increased media attention and led to the exposure of their relationship. In 2012, King Juan Carlos transferred around €65m to her as 'a gift'. In 2020, zu Sayn-Wittgenstein-Sayn, resident in the United Kingdom, filed a harassment case in London, claiming that Juan Carlos had sought the return of funds following their break-up in 2012. In 2022, Juan Carlos won an appeal on the grounds that he was king at the time of the 2012–2014 events and consequently immune from prosecution. In 2023, the High Court of England and Wales threw out the case on the grounds that it had no jurisdiction in the matter, making no judgement as to the substance of the allegations.
