= All Saints Church, Claverley =

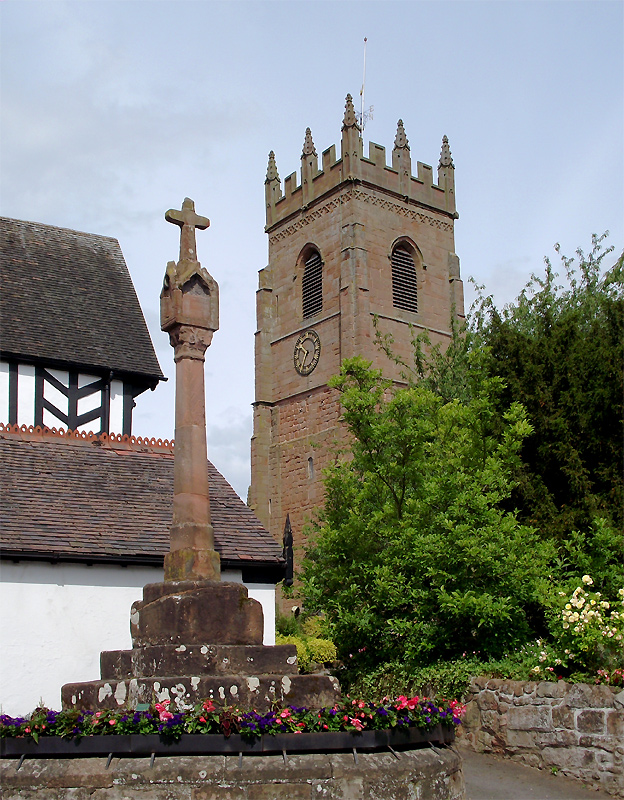
- Tower of All Saints Church, Claverley, and churchyard cross

- Location in Shropshire
- 52.5383°N 2.3072°W
- OS grid reference: SO 793 934
- Location: Claverley, Shropshire
- Country: England
- Denomination: Anglican
- Website: claverley-tuckhill.co.uk

History
- Status: Parish church
- Founder: Roger de Montgomerie

Architecture
- Functional status: Active
- Heritage designation: Grade I
- Designated: 9 March 1970
- Architect(s): W. Wood Bethell (rebuilding of tower)
- Architectural type: Church
- Style: Norman, Gothic

Specifications
- Materials: Sandstone

Administration
- Province: Canterbury
- Diocese: Hereford
- Archdeaconry: Ludlow
- Deanery: Bridgnorth
- Parish: Claverley

Clergy
- Vicar: In Vacancy

All Saints Church is in the village of Claverley, Shropshire, England. It is an active Anglican parish church in the deanery of Bridgnorth, the archdeaconry of Ludlow, and the diocese of Hereford. Its benefice is united with that of Holy Innocents, Tuck Hill. The church is recorded in the National Heritage List for England as a designated Grade I listed building.

== History ==
The church can trace its origins back to the 7th century. The present church was founded by Roger de Montgomerie, 1st Earl of Shrewsbury, who died in 1094. The tower was doubled in height and angle buttresses were added to it towards the end of the 15th century. At about the same time the north chapel was added. In 1902 the top two stages of the tower were rebuilt, faithfully copying the original design, by W. Wood Bethell.

== Architecture ==
=== Exterior ===
All Saints is constructed in local red sandstone. Its plan consists of a nave with a clerestory, north and south aisles, and a three-bay chancel with two-bay chapels to the north and south. In the centre of the south side of the church is a four-stage tower, with a two-storey porch to its west, and the south chapel to its east. On the south side of the tower is a Norman round-headed window. The chancel, with its five-light east window, is Decorated in style, and the south chapel is Perpendicular. The north chapel contains both Decorated and Perpendicular windows, this is now use as a vestry. The windows in side of the north aisle, and the west window of the nave are Decorated. There are Perpendicular windows in the south aisle, in the clerestory, and at the west end of the north aisle. The south porch and the north doorway are also Perpendicular.

=== Interior ===
The north arcade, other than the easternmost arch, is Norman, dating from the early 12th century. It consists of round arches carried on circular piers, with circular capitals. The north tower arch is late Norman, with scalloped capitals. The northwest buttress of the tower, which was added in the 15th century, projects inside the church forming a round-headed niche, known as the 'seat of penitence'. The two-bay arcade to the west of the tower dates from the middle of the 13th century. It is carried on octagonal piers with capitals carved with heads and leaves, and a depiction of "two dragons nibbling a human head". The chancel arch and the two arches leading into the north chapel are Decorated, and the arch into the south chapel is Perpendicular. The nave roof is also Perpendicular, and the chancel has a hammerbeam roof.

The font is Norman, shaped like a tub, and carved with arcades. There is a second font, which is circular, and possibly also Norman. The pulpit is Jacobean, and is carved with rosettes under arcading. The altar rail dates from about 1912, it is in Arts and Crafts style, and was made by F. Waldo Guy, brother of the vicar of the church at that time. In the west arch of the north chapel is the dado of a late medieval screen. On the walls of the nave is a scheme of paintings dating from about 1200, including a frieze of fighting knights, under which is a painting depicting the martyrdom of Saint Margaret of Antioch. The frieze, some 50 feet (15 m) long, shows a series of 15 knights in armour, mostly engaged in single combat. It has been suggested that this portrays scenes from the 5th-century poem Psychomachia, a battle between virtues and vices, by Prudentius. A recent theory is that the knight with the horn is Roland (the only surviving medieval mural of this hero) and that the Holy Cross is the unifying theme of the mural scheme. Between the windows of the clerestory, dating from the 15th century, are paintings of saints or apostles.

The stained glass in the east window dates from 1858, is by Frederick Preedy, and depicts the Te Deum. In the north wall of the north chapel (which in 2014 has been converted into a vestry) is 16th-century glass that has been re-set, including a female head, and angel and vines. The window in the east window of the south chapel, dating from about 1849, is by David Evans, and is based on Raphael's Transfiguration. There are two windows by Hardman; one in the tower depicting Doubting Thomas, and another in the north aisle. In the north chapel is a window of 1879 by W. G. Taylor depicting the Good Shepherd, while in the west wall of the nave and south aisle are two windows in Arts and Crafts style by Archibald John Davies of the Bromsgrove Guild of Applied Arts depicting the Virgin and Child with Angels and the Christ Child. They were installed in 1934 and 1936 respectively.

The oldest monument in the church is a carved slab to Richard Spicer, who died in 1448 and his wife. The monument to Sir Robert Broke, who died in 1558, and his two wives is in alabaster with three recumbent effigies on a tomb-chest, and children standing around the sides. There are also two incised slabs, one to William Gatacre, who died in 1577, and the other to Francis Gatacre, who died in 1599; all these monuments are in the south chapel. Preserved here is a battlefield marker cross from the grave in France of Captain E.G. Gatacre, Duke of Wellington's Regiment (killed in World War I 1916).

The parish war memorial consists of a series of sandstone panels between carved arches in the west end of the church, initially to 30 men who died in World War I with the names from World War II added, while the south porch contains another set of stone panels listing all men from the parish who served in the first war, indicating with stars 42 of the men that were wounded. The latter was built into the wall by Stephen Pickerell, engraved by James Summerell, and erected over 1921–22, according to an accompanying 191-word inscription, claimed to be the longest on a Shropshire war memorial.

The two-manual pipe organ was made in 1906 by J. W. Walker, and rebuilt in 1964 by W. Hawkins. There is a ring of eight bells. The oldest are two bells cast in 1703 by Abraham Rudhall I, followed by a single bell by Thomas Rudhall in 1769. Another single bell is dated 1877 and is by John Taylor and Company. The last four bells were cast in 1929 by Gillett and Johnston.

== Gallery ==
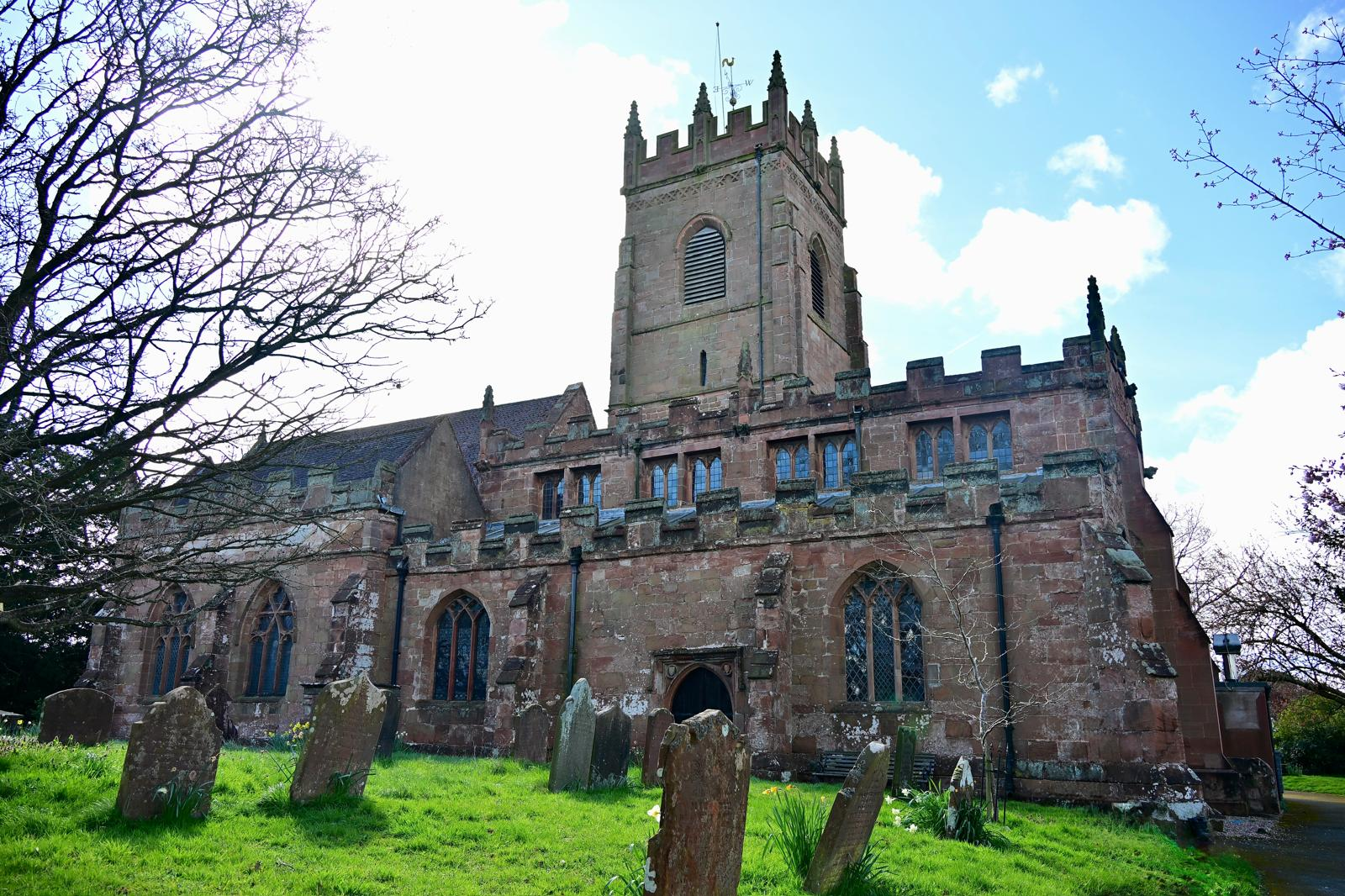
View of church from north-west

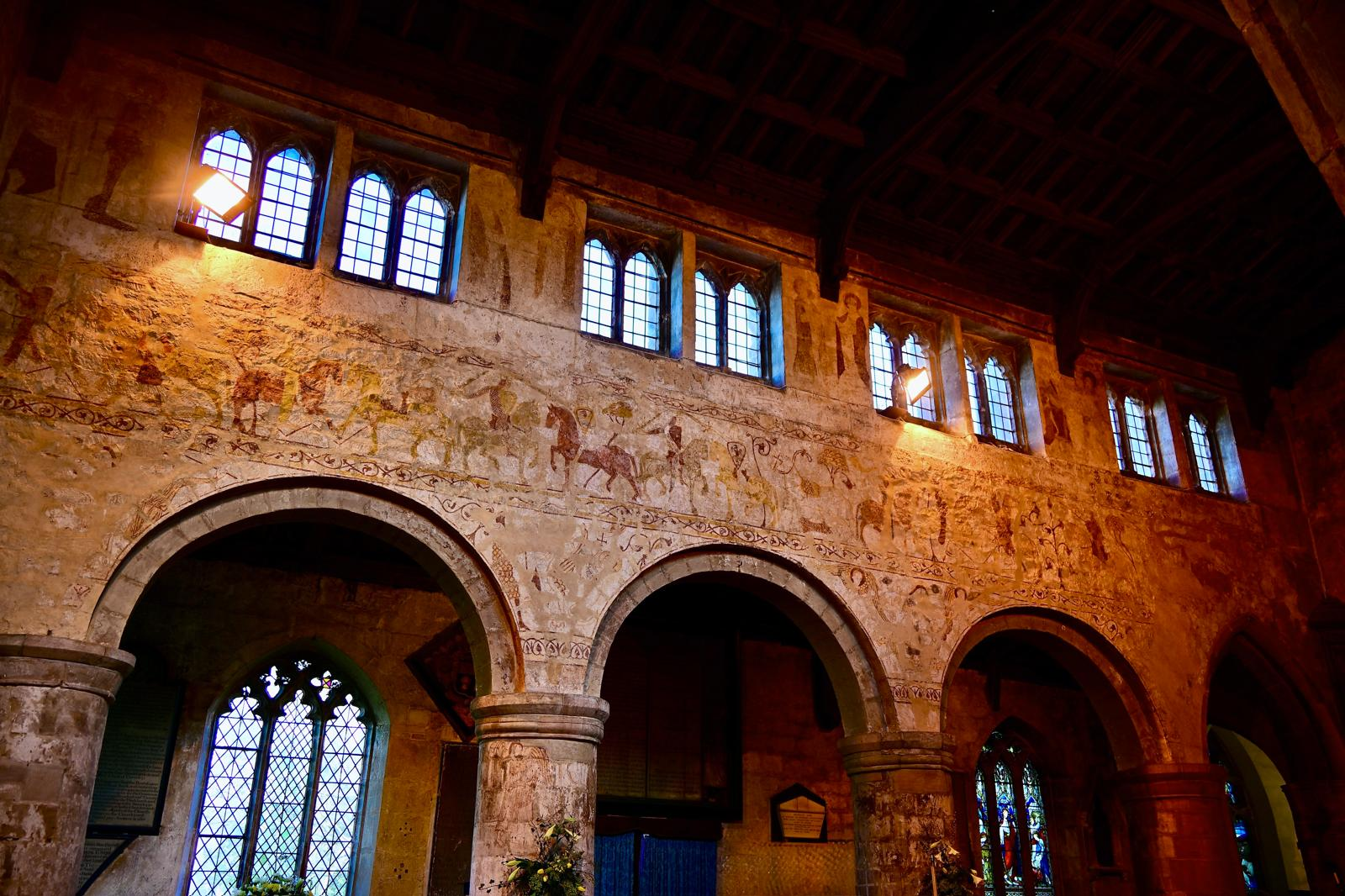
Medieval frieze on north arcade wall

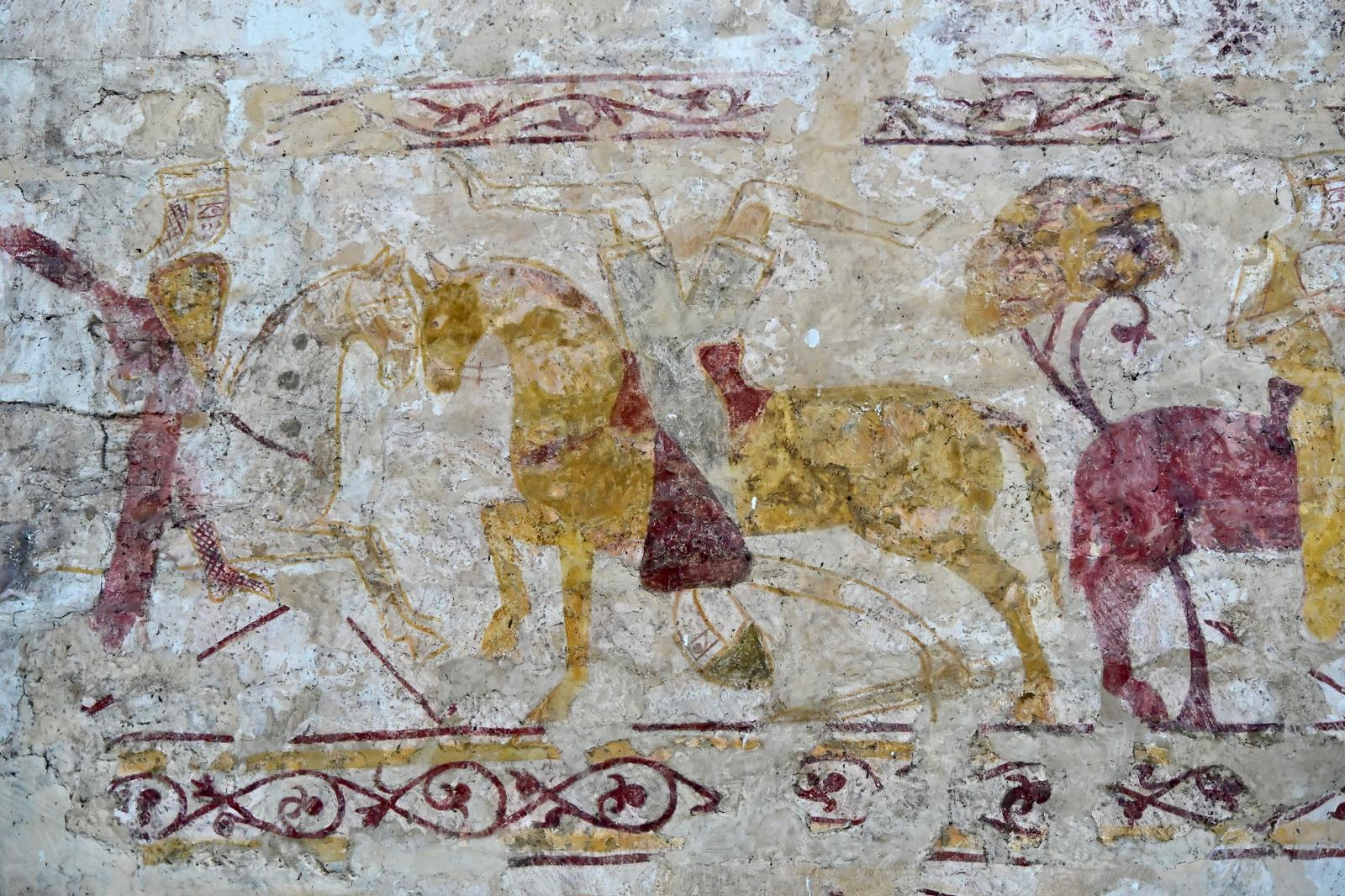
Detail of medieval frieze

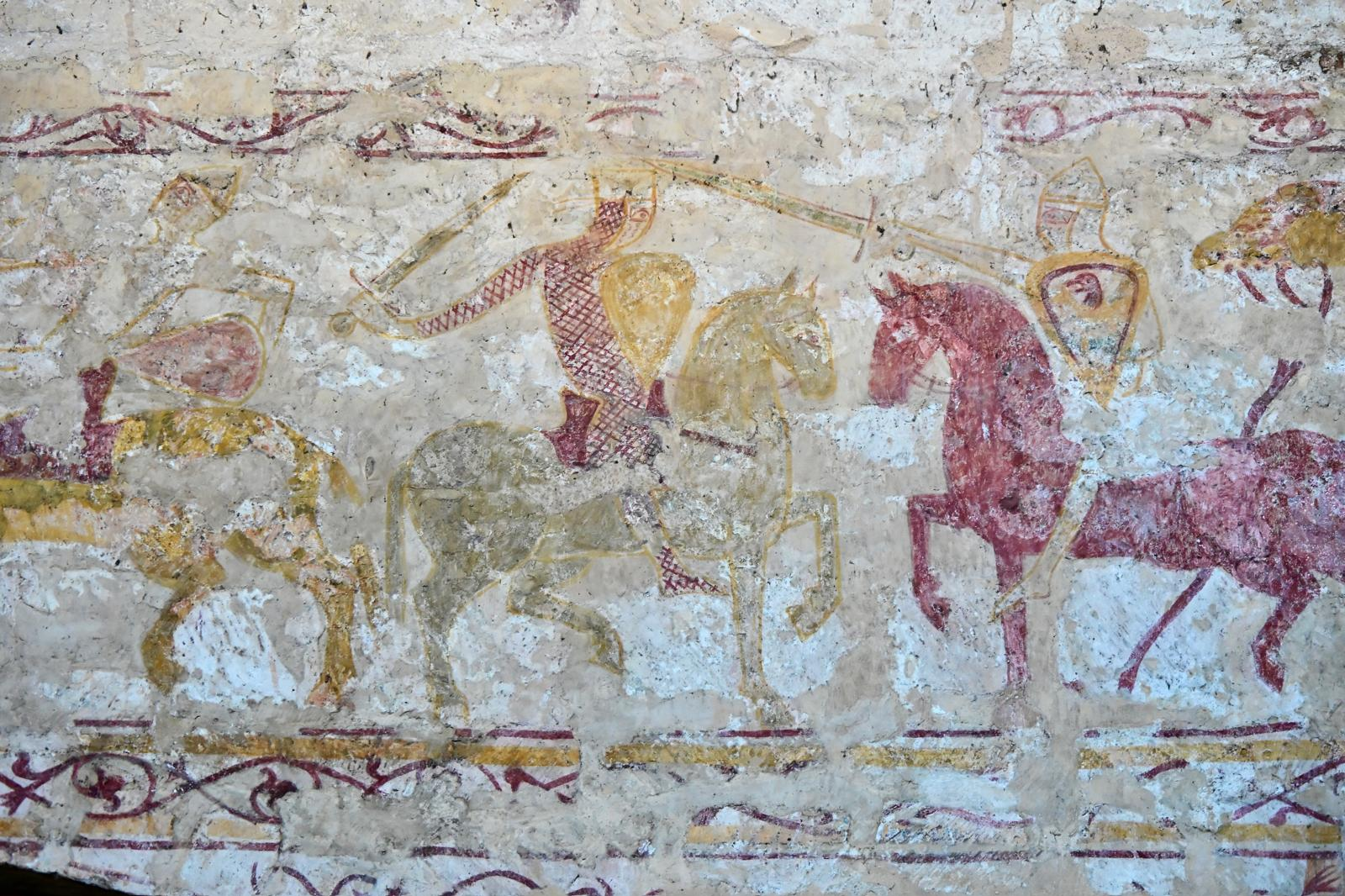
Detail of medieval frieze

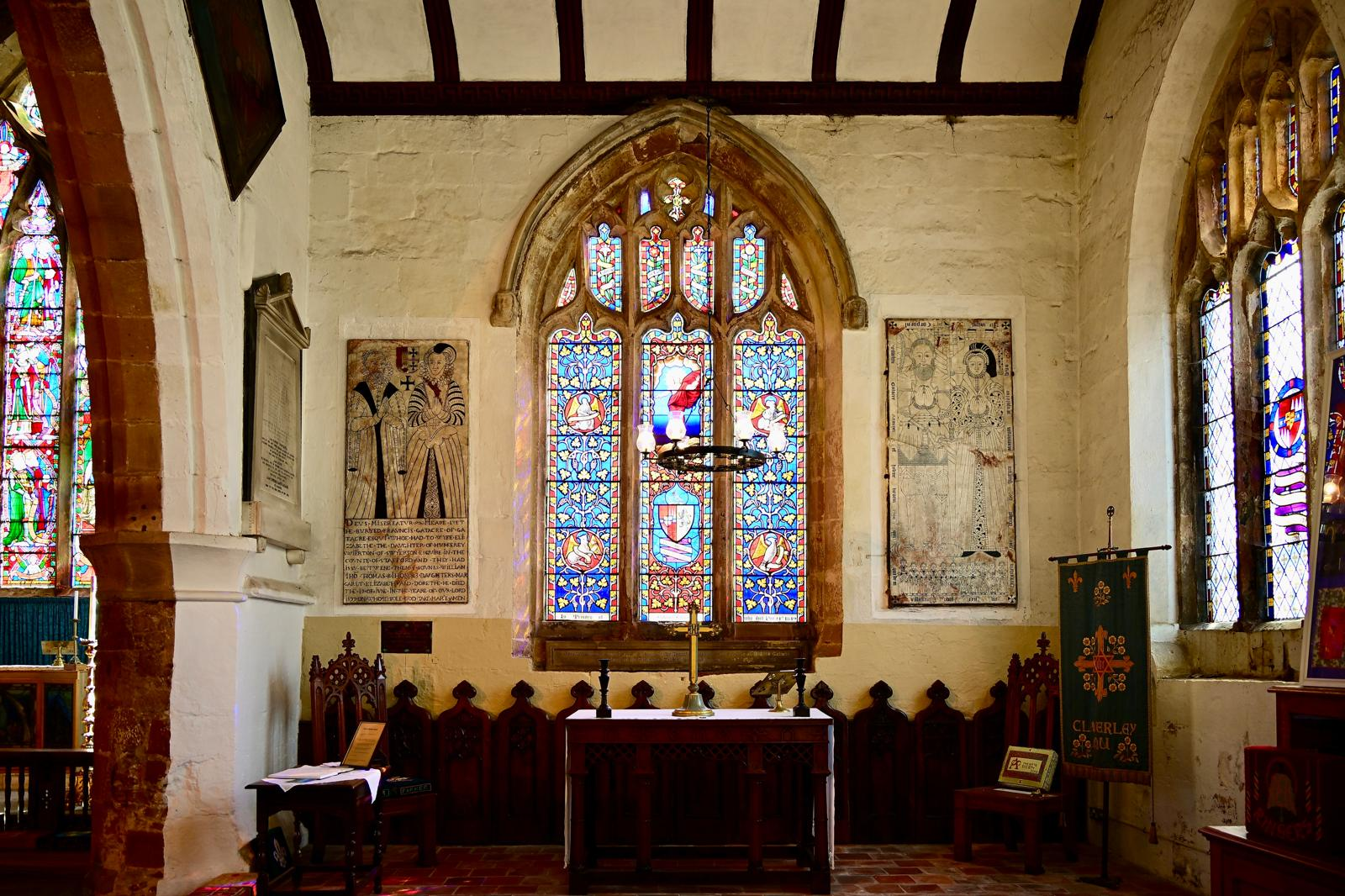
South chapel

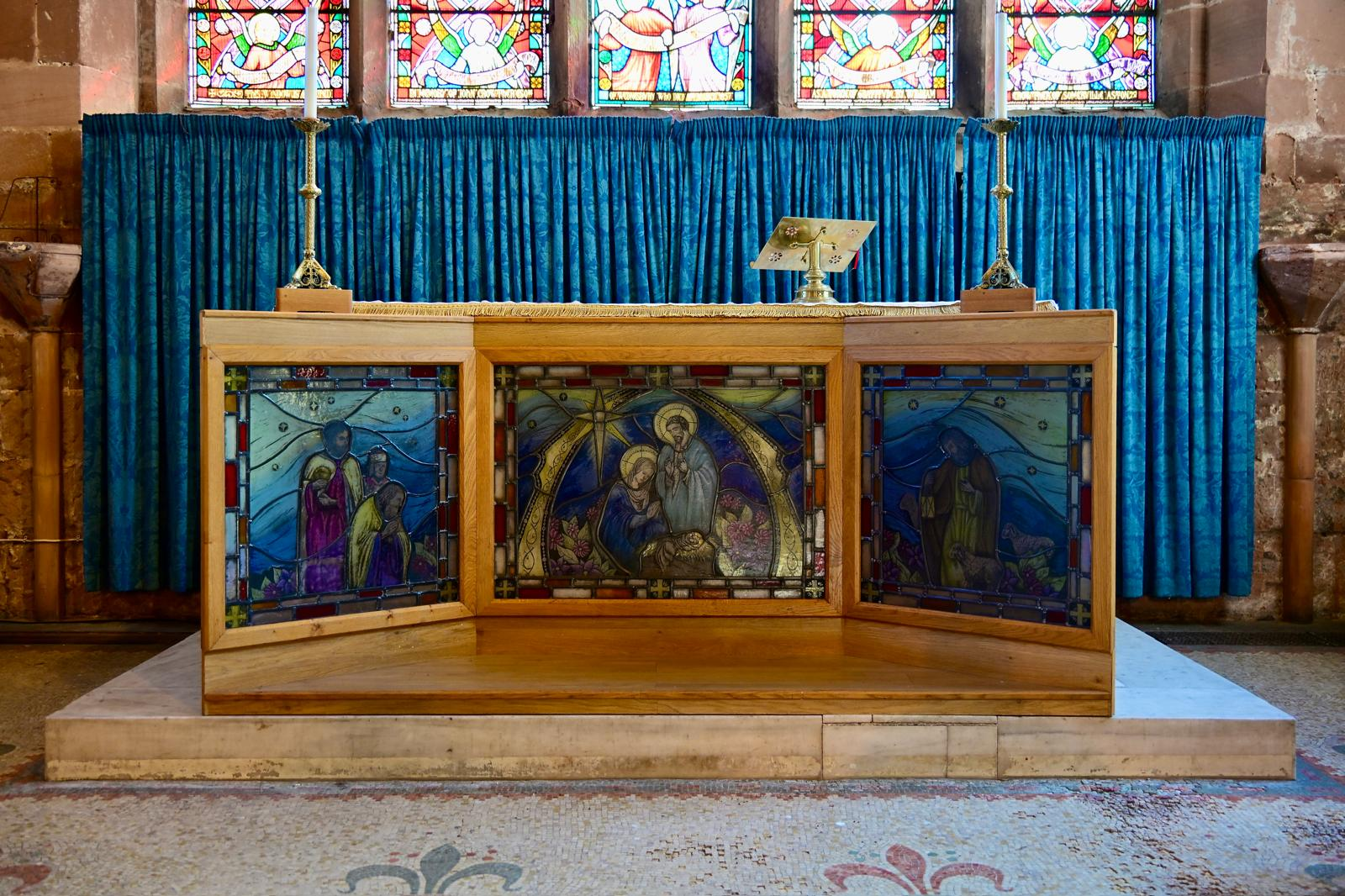
High altar

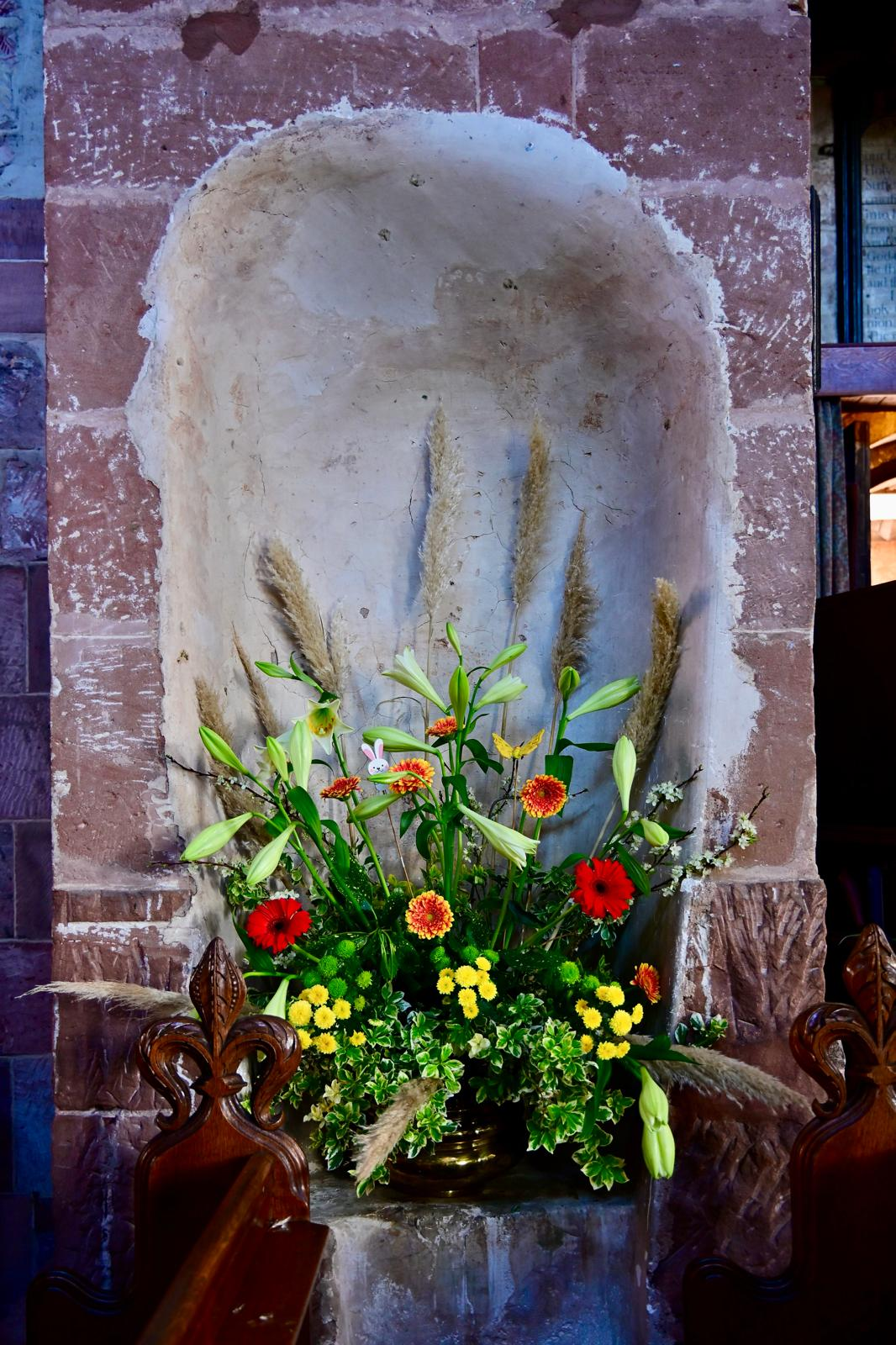
Seat of Penitence

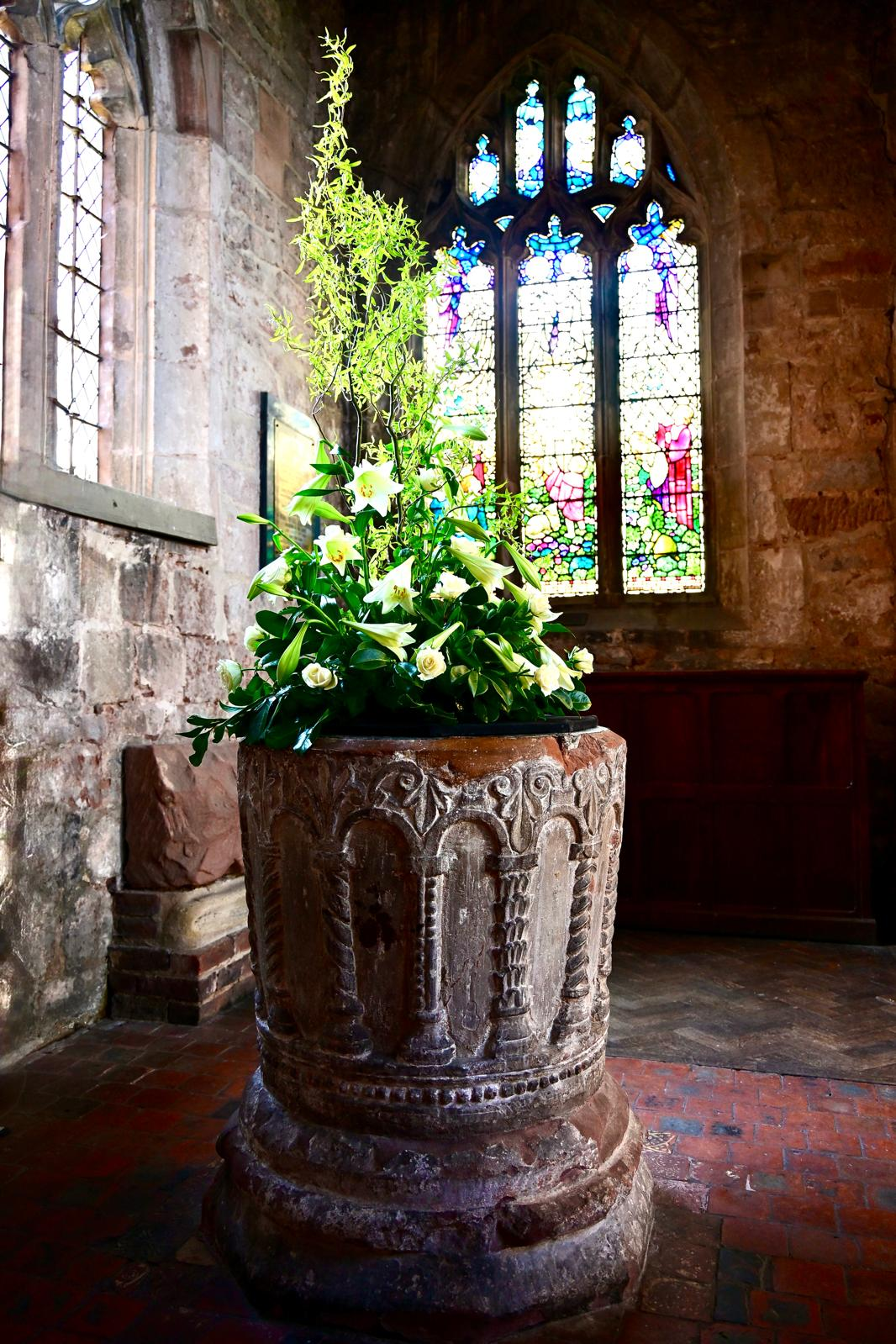
Font

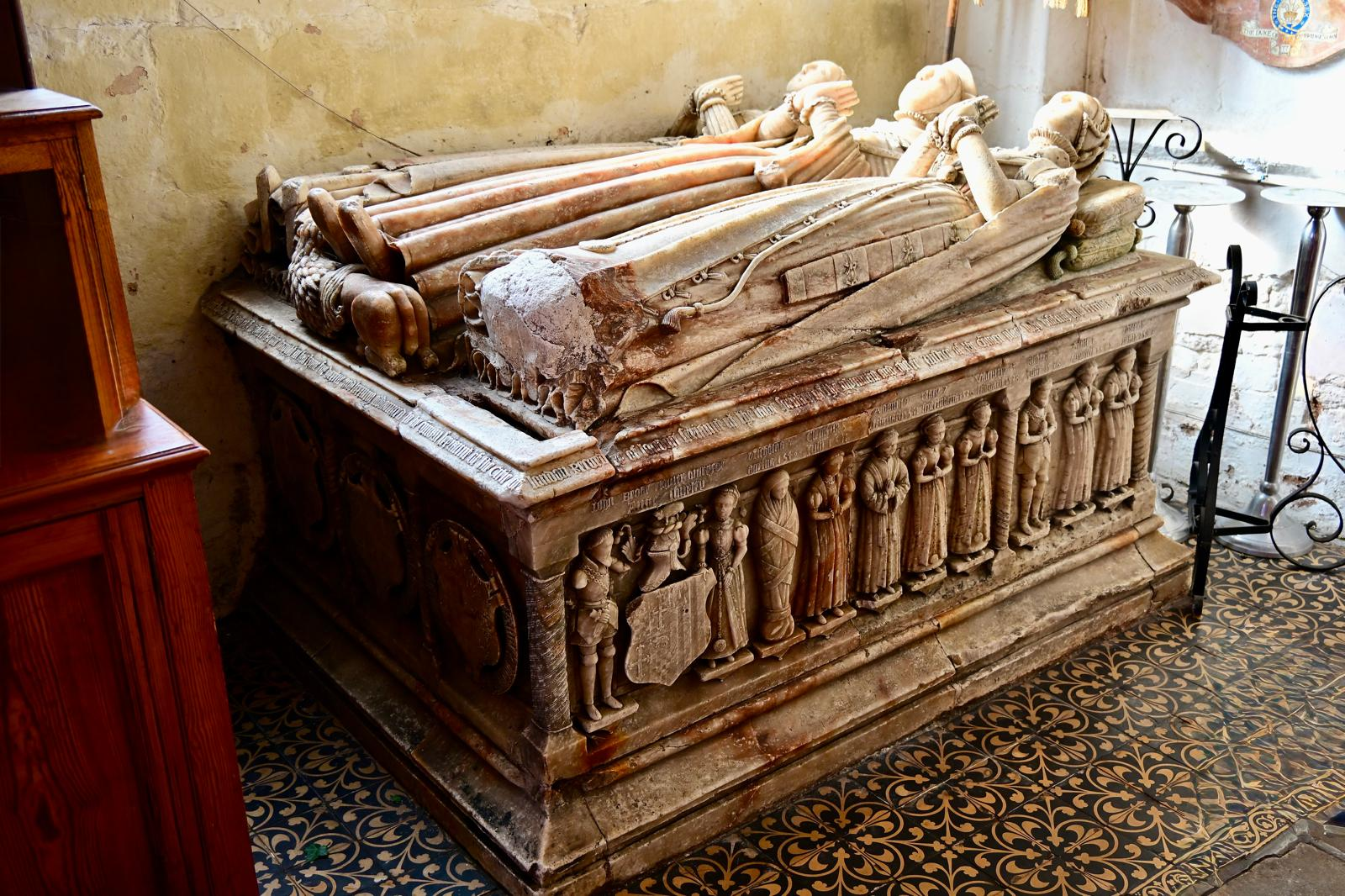
Monument to Sir Robert Broke

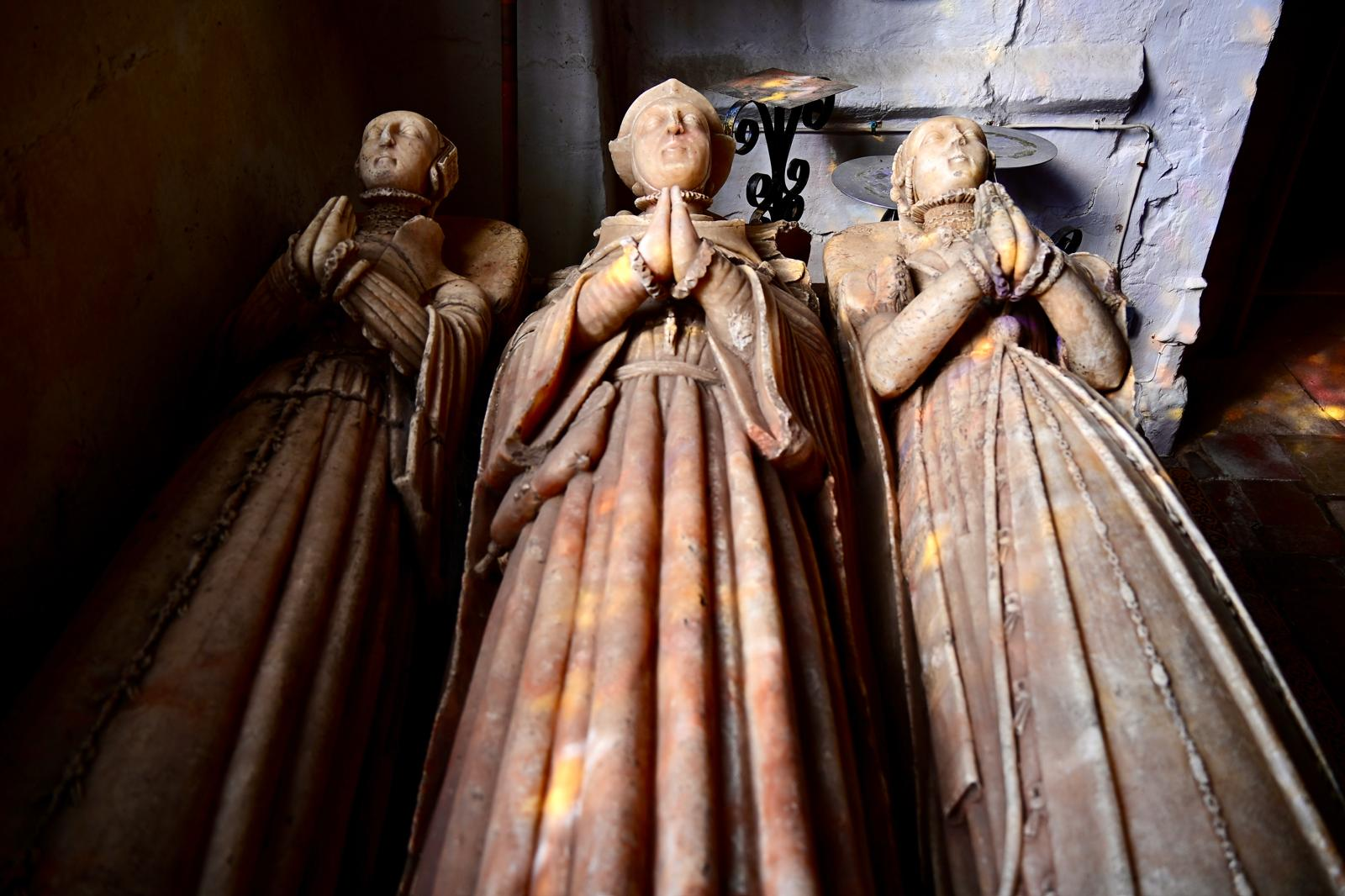
Monument to Sir Robert Broke

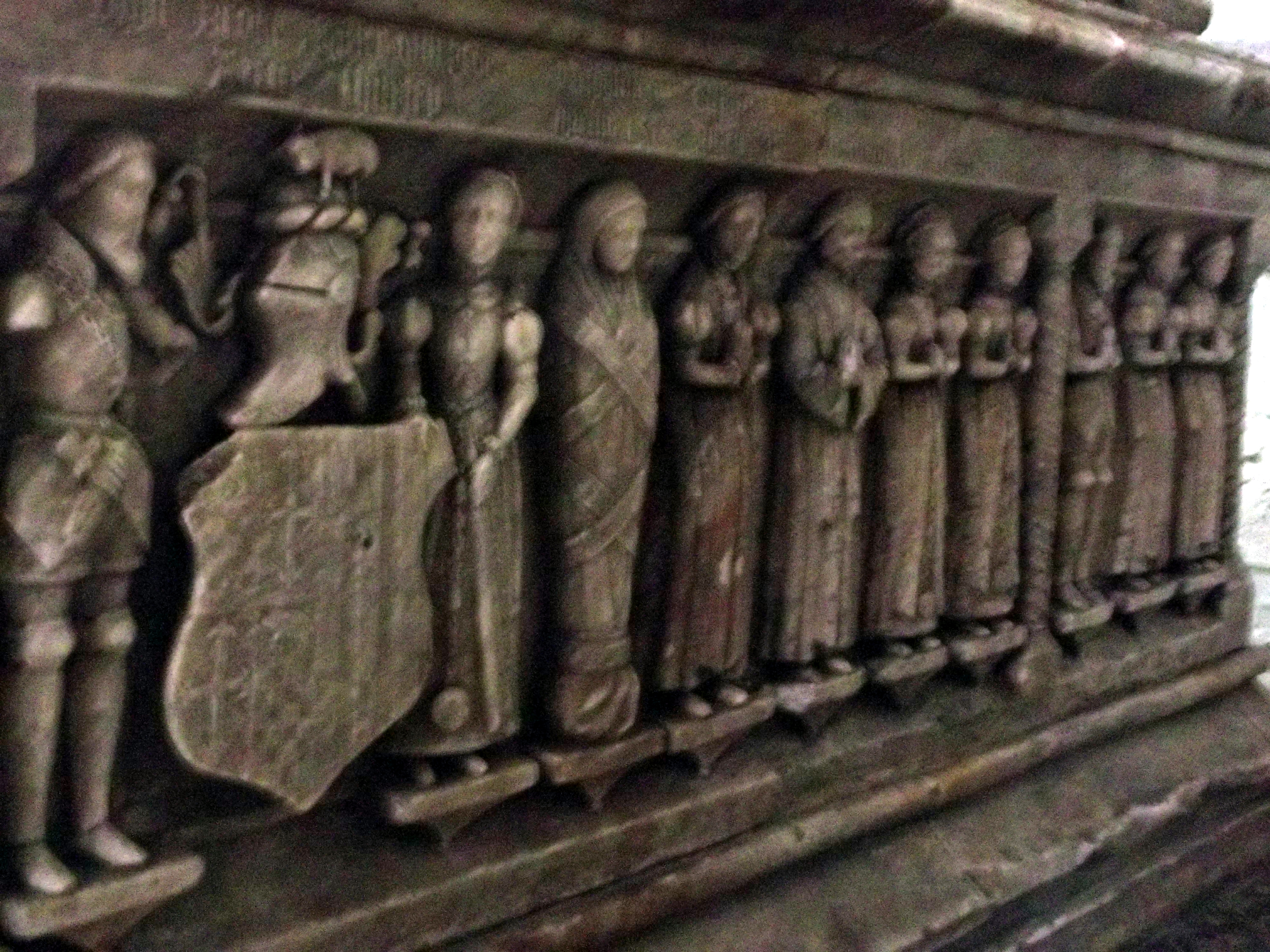
Robert Broke and Anne Waring with children

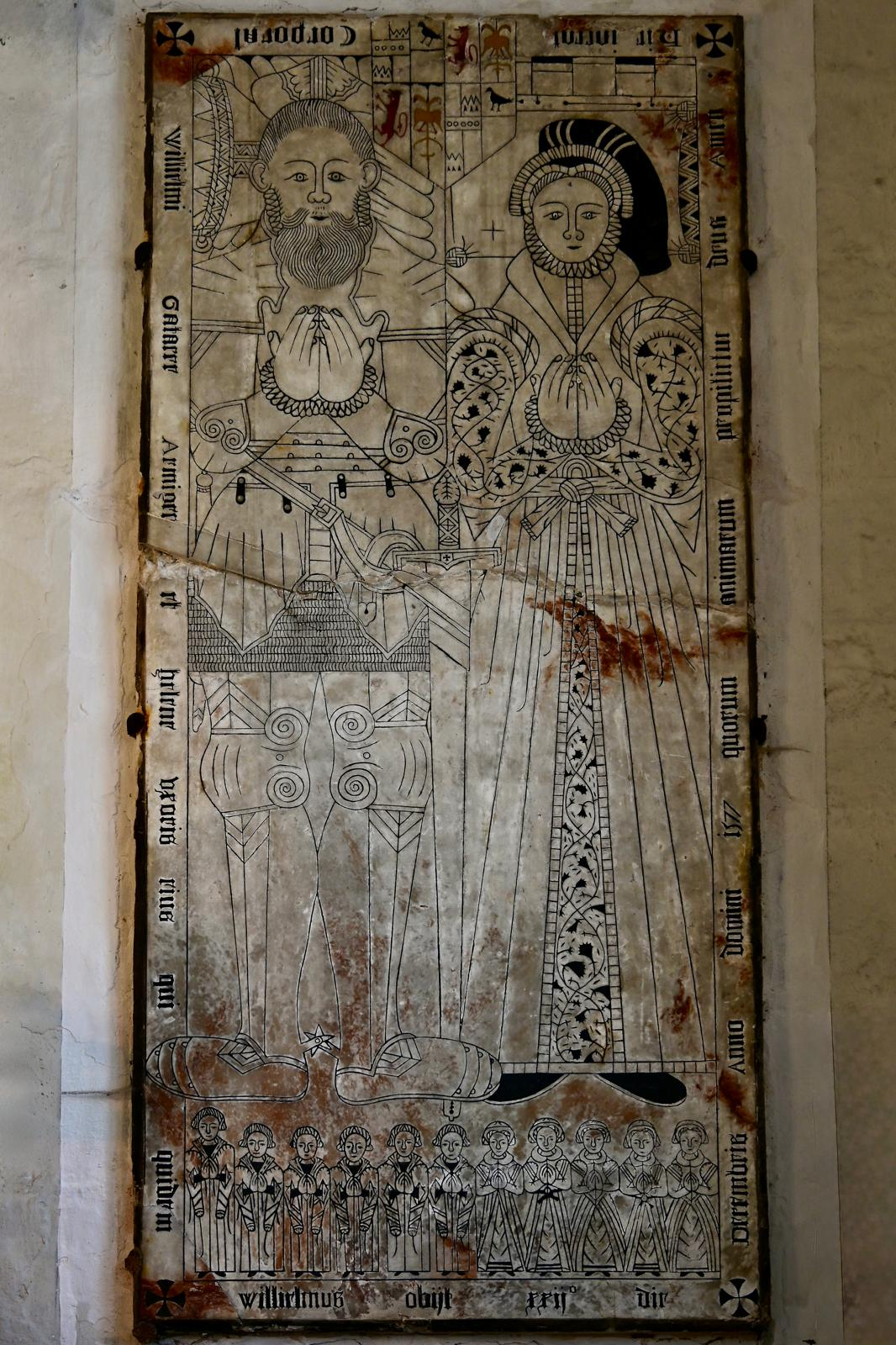
Tombstone of William Gatacre (1499-1577) and Eleanor Mytton

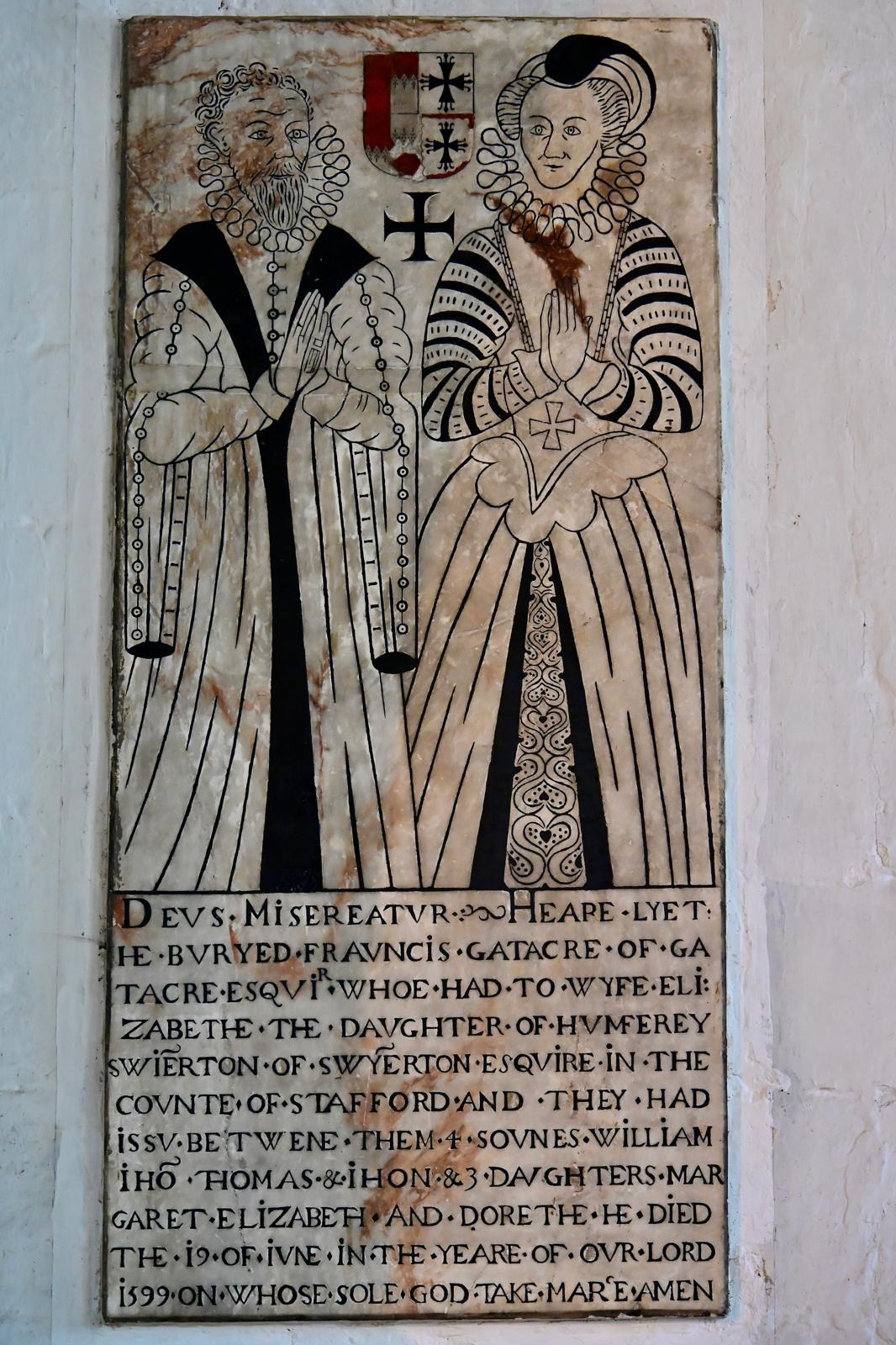
Tombstone of Francis Gatacre (d.1599) and Elizabeth Swynnerton, daughter of Humphrey Swynnerton

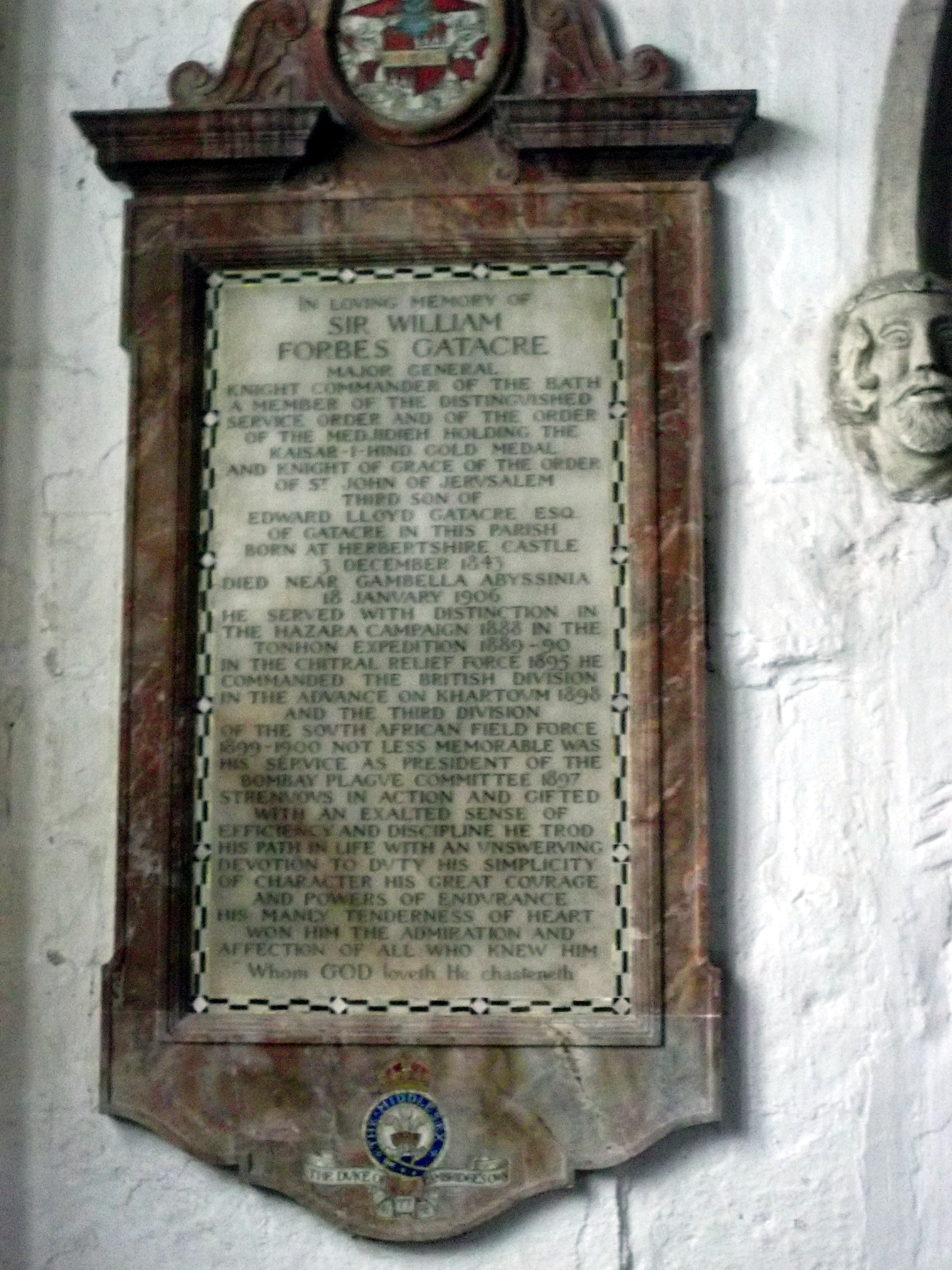
Memorial to Sir William Forbes Gatacre, a distinguished Victorian soldier of the Gatacre family of Claverley

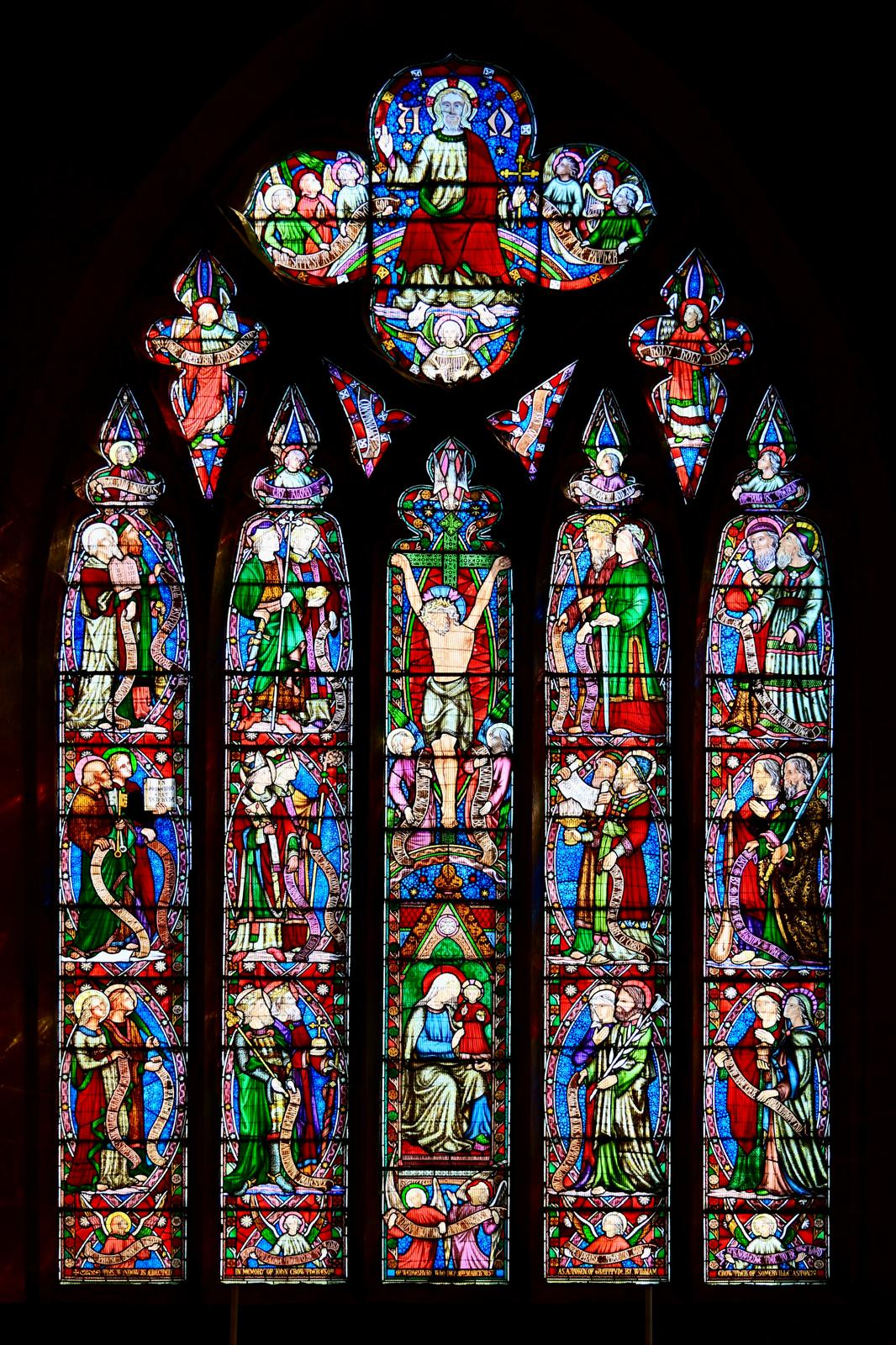
East 'Te Deum' window by Frederick Preedy, 1858

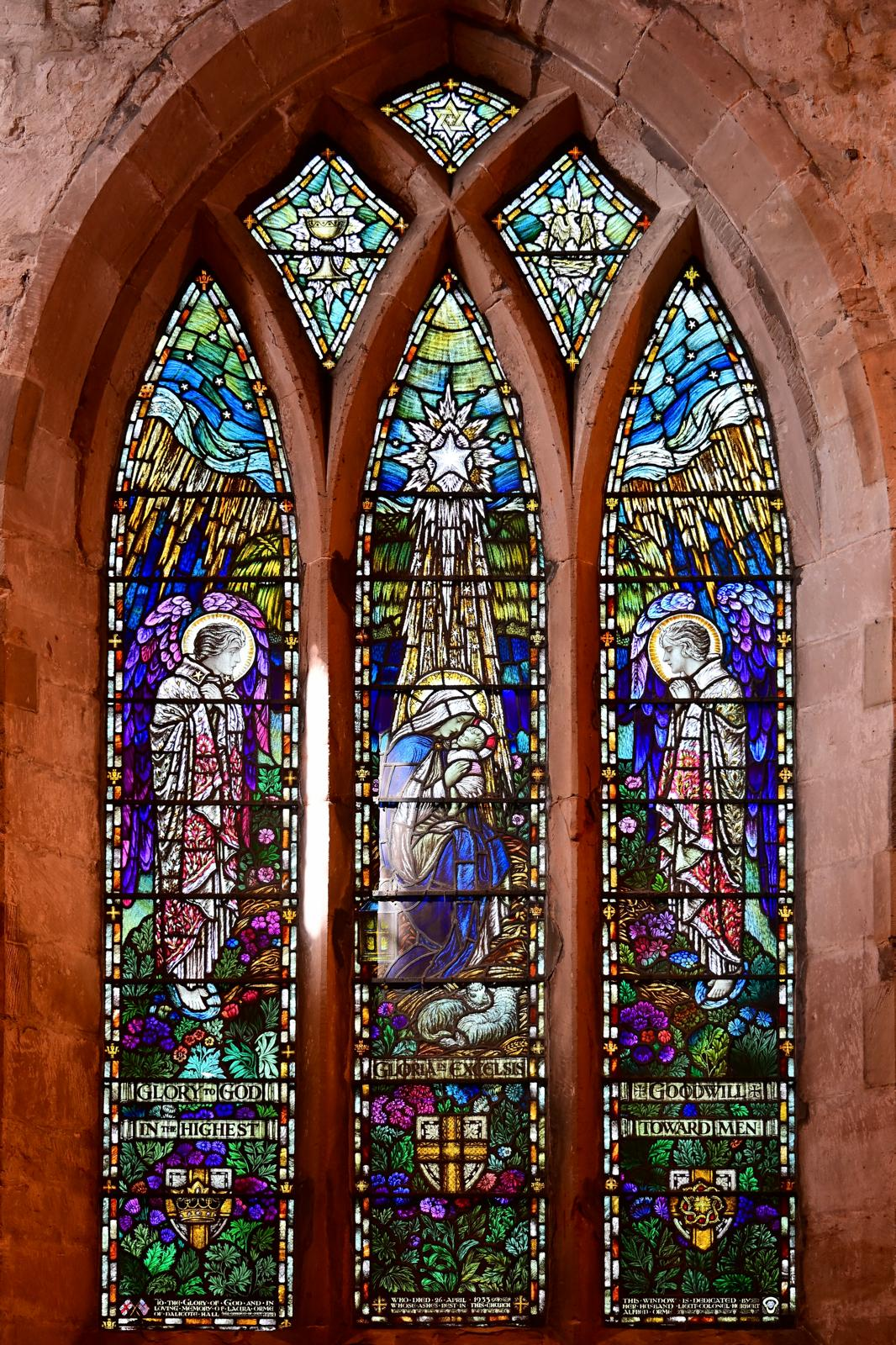
West window by Archibald John Davies, depicting the Virgin and Child with Angels (1934)

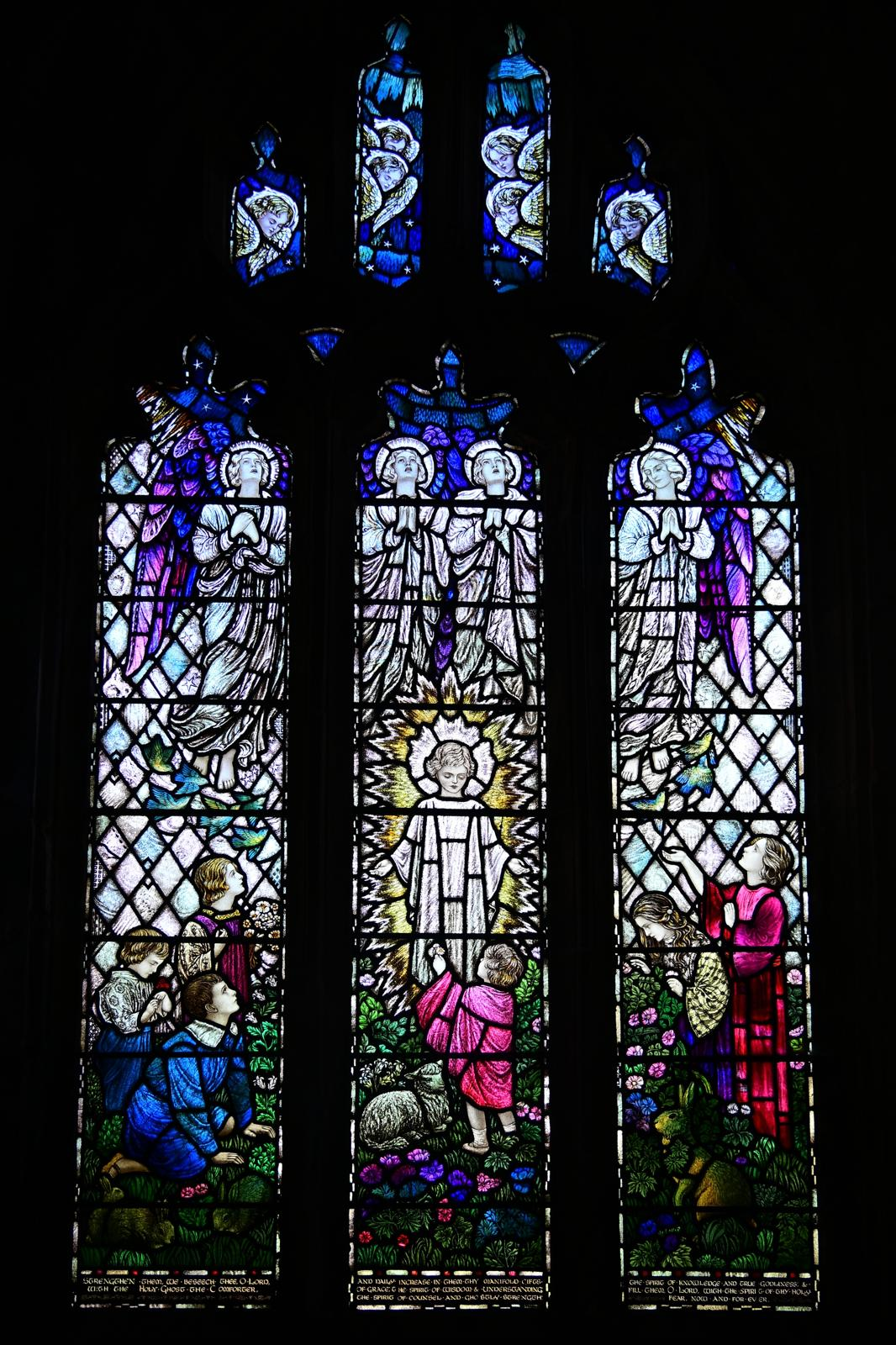
South aisle window by Archibald John Davies, depicting the Christ Child (1936)

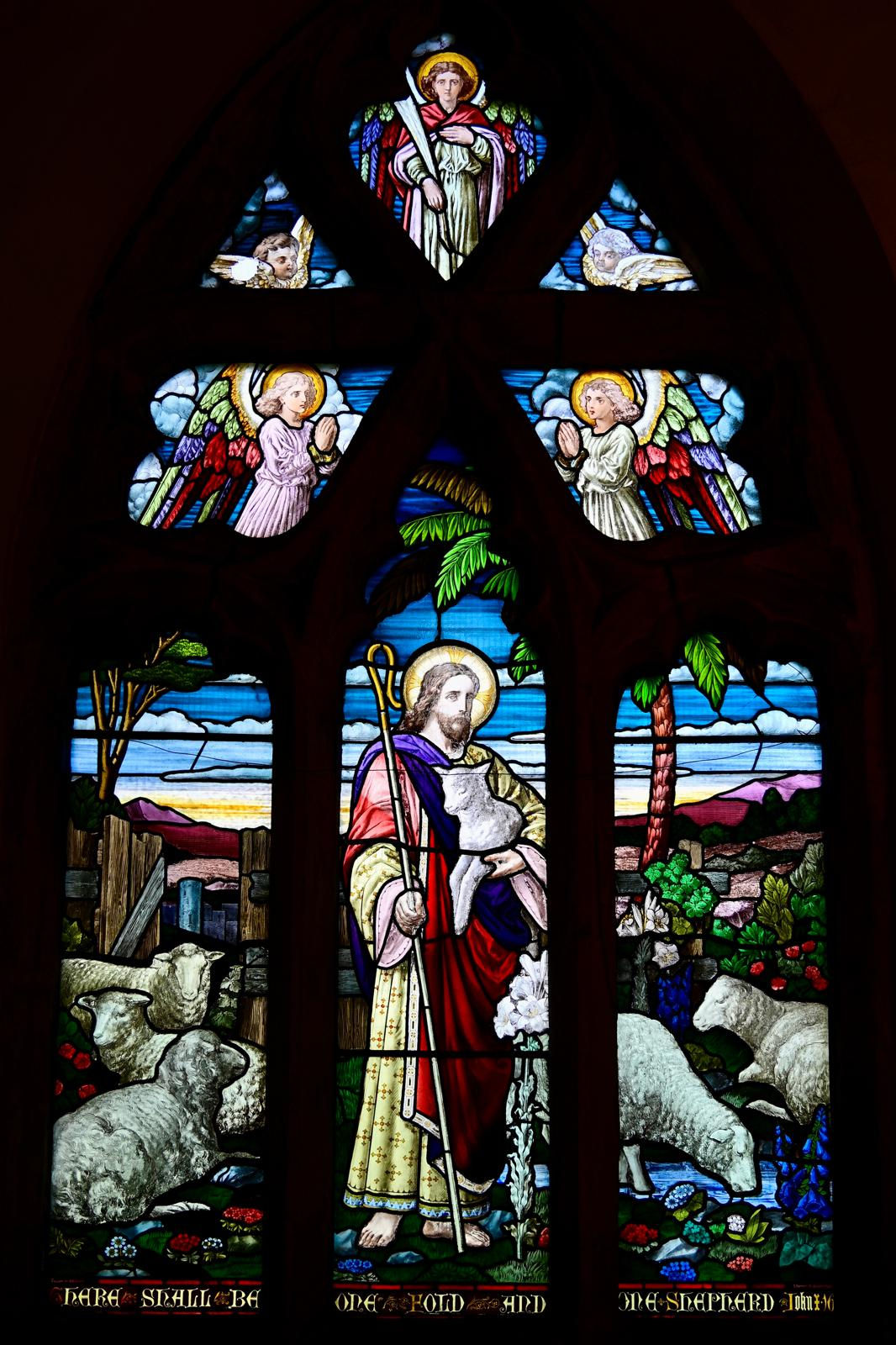
North chapel window by W. G. Taylor depicting the Good Shepherd (1879)

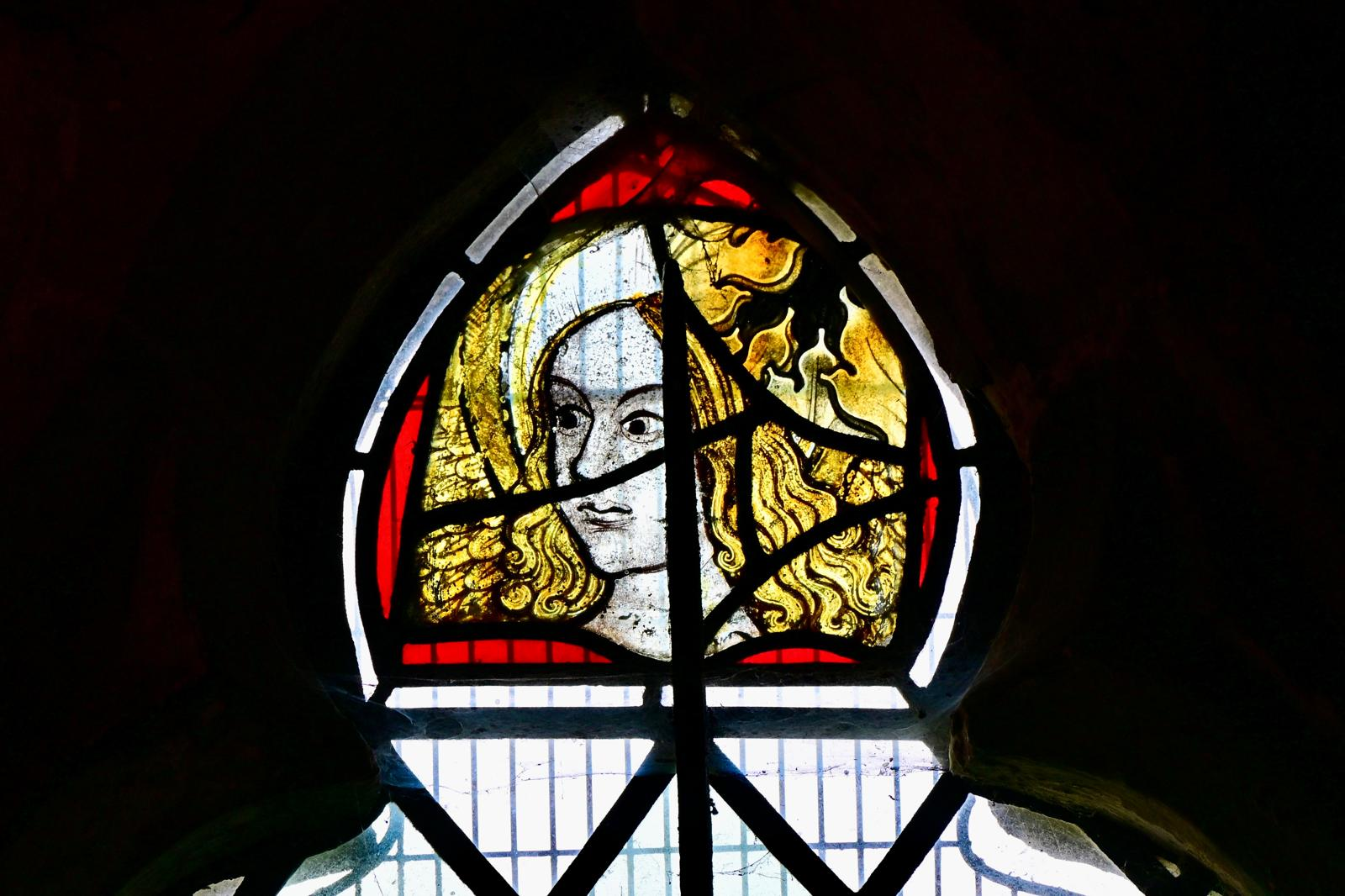
Medieval glass fragment in north chapel

== External features ==
Associated with the church are three structures that are listed at Grade II. At the entrance to the churchyard is a 14th-century cross standing on a plinth with three steps. It was formerly sited in the roadway before it was moved to the churchyard. The lychgate dates probably from the 19th century. It is constructed in brick with a tiled roof and sham timber framing with plastered ends to the gables. The walls at the east side of the churchyard and the gate piers, with their pyramidal caps, probably date from the 18th century. In the churchyard is a yew tree said to be 2,500 years old. There is also the war grave of an airman of World War II.

== Events ==
The church used to hold an exceptional Flower Festival every year, in July. These events occurred annually for around 45 years, but visitor numbers began to wane during the 2010s. The COVID pandemic saw the loss of the event for two years and the loss of many volunteers, following which the flower festival was not revived.

== See also ==
- Grade I listed churches in Shropshire
- Listed buildings in Claverley
