= Beobridge =

Hamlet in Shropshire, England

Coordinates: 52.522°N 2.307°W

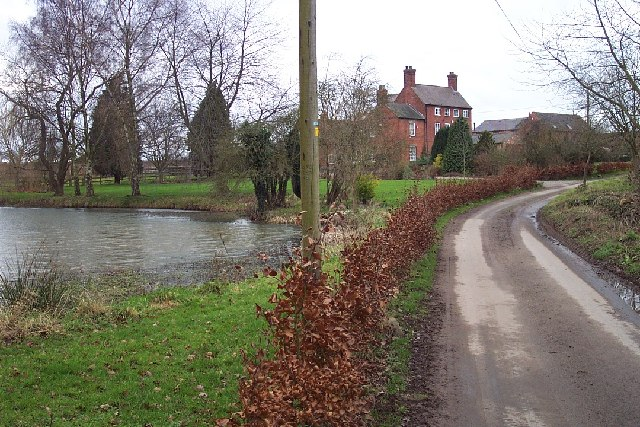
- Beobridge, Shropshire

- Location within Shropshire
- OS grid reference: SO791916
- Civil parish: Claverley
- Unitary authority: Shropshire
- Ceremonial county: Shropshire
- Region: West Midlands
- Country: England
- Sovereign state: United Kingdom
- Post town: WOLVERHAMPTON
- Postcode district: WV5
- Dialling code: 01746
- Police: West Mercia
- Fire: Shropshire
- Ambulance: West Midlands
- UK Parliament: Ludlow

Beobridge is a small, scattered hamlet in Shropshire, England. It is in the civil parish of Claverley.

Its name probably comes from Old English beo, "bee", and bryce, "bridge"; "bridge of the bees".

== See also ==
- Listed buildings in Claverley
