= Listed buildings in Claverley =

Claverley is a civil parish in Shropshire, England. It contains 62 listed buildings that are recorded in the National Heritage List for England. Of these, two are listed at Grade I, the highest of the three grades, three are at Grade II*, the middle grade, and the others are at Grade II, the lowest grade. The parish contains the village of Claverley and smaller settlements, including Beobridge, but is otherwise entirely rural. Most of the listed buildings are houses, cottages, farmhouses and farm buildings, many of which are timber framed and date from the 14th to the 17th century. The other listed buildings include a church and items in the churchyard, country houses and associated structures, public houses, a war memorial and a school.

== Key ==
Grade	Criteria
I	Buildings of exceptional interest, sometimes considered to be internationally important
II*	Particularly important buildings of more than special interest
II	Buildings of national importance and special interest

== Buildings ==
Name and location	Photograph	Date	Notes	Grade
All Saints Church; 52.53829°N 2.30706°W		11th century	The tower was heightened in the late 15th century, and rebuilt in 1902. The body of the church is in Decorated and Perpendicular styles. The church consists of a nave, north and south aisles, a two-storey south porch, a chancel with chapels, and a south tower. The tower has four stages, with a frieze and an embattled parapet.	I
Churchyard Cross; 52.53798°N 2.30672°W		14th century	The cross has been moved from a different site and erected at the entrance to the churchyard. It is in stone and stands on a plinth on three steps.	II
High Grosvenor; 52.54028°N 2.33958°W		Late 14th century	There are two parallel wings, the rear wing being the longer and the older. The house is timber framed with tile roofs, and the rear range has two storeys and is rendered. The shorter front range is taller, with two storeys and an attic, the timber framing is exposed, and the upper storey and the gables are jettied. The windows are later casements.	II
Old Hall; 52.53911°N 2.30574°W	—	15th century (probable}	The house was altered in the 17th century, it is timber framed with brick infill and some stone, and has a tile roof. There is a single storey with an attic and cellar, and a front of four bays. It has two doors, casement windows, and two two-light dormers.	II*
The Vicarage; 52.53795°N 2.30690°W		15th century	The vicarage is timber framed with a tile roof. It has two storeys, the upper storey jettied on three sides. There is a double doorway, one sash window, the other windows being casements. The right gable end also has a jettied gable with a moulded bressumer, ornamental bargeboards, an oriel window, and carved heads and foliage.	II*
Woundale; 52.53398°N 2.33669°W	—	16th century (probable}	A timber framed cottage with brick infill on a stone plinth, with a tile roof. It has two storeys and two bays. The windows are casements, and the gable facing the road has bargeboards.	II
Ludstone Hall; 52.54780°N 2.29636°W		c. 1607	A country house in Jacobean style on a moated site. It is in brick with stone dressings and a tiled roof, and has an H-shaped plan, two storeys and attics. The entrance front has three shaped gables, the central part recessed and containing a two-storey bow window with a balustraded parapet. The windows are mullioned and transomed, and the attic windows have pediments with swags and side scrolled panels.	I
3 Beobridge; 52.51841°N 2.31898°W	—	17th century	A timber framed house with brick infill and a tile roof. It has one storey and an attic, and two bays. The windows are casements, those in the attic in gabled dormers.	II
4 and 5A High Street; 52.53747°N 2.30644°W	—	17th century	A pair of houses, partly timber framed with brick infill, and partly in brick, with a tile roof and one storey with attics. In the ground floor are two doorways, a shop window to the left and two bow windows to the right. In the attic are three gabled dormers.	II
16 and 17 High Street; 52.53661°N 2.30570°W	—	17th century	A pair of timber framed houses with a tile roof, hipped on the left. There are two storeys, a T-shaped plan, and the house is canted on the left corner. It has a gabled porch and on the front most of the windows are small-paned.	II
Bine Farm House; 52.50239°N 2.33416°W		17th century	The farmhouse is built in timber framing and brick, and has a tile roof. There are two storeys, casement windows, and a gabled porch.	II
Cornerways; 52.53726°N 2.30612°W		17th century	A timber framed house on a stone plinth with a tile roof. There are two storeys and four bays. On the front are two doorways and casement windows, and in the left gable end is a corbelled window.	II
Crown Inn; 52.53751°N 2.30625°W		17th century	The public house is timber framed with brick nogging, and has two storeys and attics. In parts the upper floor and the attic are jettied, the gables have ornamental bargeboards, and in the left gable end are carved corner brackets. The windows are casements.	II
Hopstone House; 52.54751°N 2.31813°W	—	17th century	The house is partly timber framed and partly in brick on a stone plinth with a tile roof. The centre part has three storeys, the wings have two storeys, and there is a low projecting wing on the front. The windows are casements, and there are wooden finials on the gables.	II
Powk Hall; 52.53671°N 2.30807°W	—	17th century	A timber framed farmhouse, partly roughcast, with a tile roof, partly hipped. There are two storeys, the upper storey slightly jettied with a moulded fascia. The farmhouse has an L-shaped plan, a low tower with a pyramidal rood in the angle, and a lean-to on the left. Steps lead up to the doorway that has a fanlight, and the windows are casements.	II
Shipley Hall; 52.56022°N 2.28269°W	—	17th century	A brick house that has a tile roof with coped gables. There are two storeys and an attic, and three bays. The windows are mullioned and transomed, and the doorway has moulded jambs and lintel.	II
Outbuilding, The Dairy House; 52.54683°N 2.29663°W	—	17th century	Originally a timber framed cottage with brick nogging on a stone plinth, it has been incorporated into later outbuildings. It has a tiled roof and contains later casement windows.	II
The Mount; 52.54611°N 2.31736°W	—	17th century	The house was extended in the 19th century. It is partly in brick and partly in stone, and has a tile roof. There is an irregular plan, two storeys, and a symmetrical front of three bays. The central round-headed doorway has a fanlight and a bracketed hood, and the windows are sashes with moulded stone lintels and keyblocks.	II
The Old House; 52.54629°N 2.31667°W	—	17th century	The house, which has been restored, is in brick on a stone plinth with stone quoins, a moulded string course, dentil eaves, and a tile roof with coped gables. There are two storeys and an attic, three bays, and a lower wing to the left. The windows are modern and are mullioned.	II
Upper Aston; 52.54278°N 2.27546°W	—	17th century	A cottage, partly timber framed and partly in brick, later incorporated into an outbuilding. It has a single storey, a tile roof, and contains casement windows.	II
Woundale Farm House; 52.53517°N 2.33631°W	—	17th century	The original part of the farmhouse is timber framed with plaster infill, it was extended to the left in brick in the 18th century, and the timber framed porch was added in 1925. There are two storeys and an attic, and the roof is tiled. The right bay is gabled, the upper storey and gable are slightly jettied, and there are moulded bressumers. To the left is a two-storey gabled porch with balustraded sides, and the windows are casements with lattice glazing.	II*
King's Barn; 52.52180°N 2.32760°W	—	1671	A farmhouse with two storeys and an H-shaped plan. The hall range and right cross-wing are in brick, the left cross-wing is timber framed and the roof is tiled. The windows date from the 20th century and are mullioned and transomed, and contain casements.	II
Church House and Upper Church House; 52.53770°N 2.30665°W		Late 17th century (probable)	A pair of houses once used as a workhouse, they are in stone with repairs in brick, and have tile roofs. The houses are set at an angle on a road junction, and have three storeys and a basement, and fronts of three and four bays. The windows are a mix of sashes and casements.	II
Newin House; 52.54409°N 2.27623°W	—	c. 1700	An inn, later a private house, it is in brick with stone dressings, rusticated quoins, a moulded eaves cornice, and a tile roof with coped gables. There are two storeys and an attic and five bays. The windows are a mix of sashes and casements and in the attic are gabled dormers. On one side is a metal verandah.	II
6 and 7 Claverley Bull Ring; 52.53792°N 2.30644°W	—	18th century	A pair of houses at right angles in brick with tile roofs. On the right is a recessed wing with one storey and an attic. It contains two doorways, one window and two gabled dormers. Projecting forward on the left with the gable towards the road, the other house has two storeys, a dentilled brick band, two two-light mullioned casement windows, and a later canted bay window.	II
Church of England School; 52.53775°N 2.30698°W		18th century	Gothic features were added to the school in about 1860. It is in red brick on a stone retaining wall, and has dentilled eaves and a tile roof. There is a symmetrical front with two storeys in the centre and one at the sides. A ramp lead up to the central door which has a pointed arched head. Flanking it and in the upper storey are mullioned and transomed windows. The outer parts contain three tall windows under a gablet, and on the roof is a bellcote with a pyramidal roof.	II
Churchyard wall and gate piers 52.53828°N 2.30662°W	—	18th century	The retaining wall on the east side of the churchyard of All Saints Church is in stone. It contains a pair of gate piers surmounted by pyramidal cornice caps. Steps with a wrought iron handrail lead up to the church.	II
Dalicott Hall; 52.54924°N 2.33503°W	—	Mid 18th century	A country house that was extended in the 19th century. It is in brick with stone dressings, a cornice, a balustraded parapet, and a tile roof. The main block has three storeys and five bays, and is flanked by two-storey wings. The windows are sashes with segmental heads and keystones. On the front is a colonnaded porch, and at the rear is a bow window.	II
Farmcote Hall; 52.52730°N 2.32256°W	—	18th century	A brick house partly on a stone plinth, with a hipped tiled roof. There are three storeys, three bays, and a low wing on the left. The doorway has columns, a fanlight and a pedimented head, and the windows have rusticated lintels.	II
Farmcote House; 52.52859°N 2.32342°W	—	18th century	A brick house with a tile roof, three storeys and a front of four bays. The doorway has fluted pilasters, a fanlight and an open pediment, and the windows are sashes. On the left gable end is a two-storey bay window surmounted by a railed verandah.	II
Gatacre Hall; 52.50979°N 2.30713°W	—	18th century	A brick house that was extended in 1812, abandoned in 1946, and was undergoing restoration in the 2000s. It has a cornice, a parapet and a hipped roof. There is a central range of three storeys and five bays, flanked by projecting two-storey single-bay wings with corner pilasters and returns of four bays. There is a stone porch with Ionic columns, and the windows are sashes with keystones.	II
King's Arms Inn; 52.53768°N 2.30640°W		18th century	The public house is in brick with a tile roof, two storeys and an attic. It has three bays, and a single-storey gabled wing to the left. Steps lead up to a doorway between canted bay windows containing sash windows. The other windows are casements.	II
Linden Lea; 52.53306°N 2.27665°W	—	18th century (probable)	A stone house with a thatched roof, two storeys and two bays. The windows are casements, those in the upper floor in eyebrow dormers. The doorway has a thatched porch.	II
Lower Beobridge; 52.51876°N 2.31727°W	—	18th century	The house has an earlier core, it is in brick, and has a dentilled eaves cornice and a tile roof. There are two storeys and four bays. On the front is a two-storey porch with a segmental-headed entrance, and the windows are sashes.	II
Gate piers and gates, Lower Beobridge; 52.51869°N 2.31753°W	—	18th century	The wrought iron gates are at the entrance to the garden. They are flanked by square brick piers with moulded stone cornice caps and pineapple finials.	II
Garden House, Lower Beobridge; 52.51855°N 2.31662°W	—	18th century	The garden house is in brick with a dentilled eaves cornice, and an ogival lead roof with a weathervane. It has an octagonal plan, two sash windows, and a doorway with a moulded surround, pilasters, and a pediment.	II
Shipley Grange Farmhouse; 52.56116°N 2.28526°W	—	Mid 18th century	The farmhouse is in brick with a corbelled cornice and a tile roof. It has an L-shaped plan with a main range and a double-depth range at the rear. There are two storeys and an attic, and a symmetrical three-bay front. The windows are mullioned and transomed, the central doorway has a rectangular fanlight, and there are two gabled dormers.	II
White House Farm House; 52.54299°N 2.27571°W	—	18th century	The farmhouse is roughcast with a dentilled eaves cornice and a tile roof with coped gables. There are two storeys and two bays. In the centre is a doorway with a moulded surround and a pediment, and the windows are sashes. To the left is a single-storey brick wing with a slate roof and exposed timber framing in the left gable.	II
Thornescroft; 52.55991°N 2.28424°W	—	1771	A brick house with a tile roof, three storeys and a symmetrical front of three bays. Above the central doorway is a rectangular fanlight, and the windows are casements, those in the lower two floors with segmental heads. On the front is a datestone.	II
Heathton House and stable 52.52801°N 2.27583°W	—	Late 18th century	The farmhouse and attached stable wing are in brick with tile roofs. The house has dentilled eaves and a hipped roof, three storeys, a front of three bays, and a two-storey rear wing. Above the doorway is a pediment, and the windows on the front are sashes. To the north is a single-storey stable wing with coped gables.	II
21 High Street; 52.53566°N 2.30489°W	—	1779	A brick house with a tile roof, two storeys and two bays. The central doorway has a bracketed hood, and the windows are sashes with rusticated lintels and keystones.	II
Former Stable Block, Chyknell; 52.53772°N 2.33027°W	—	1792	The former stable block is in brick with dentil eaves and a tile roof, and consists of a single-storey long range with two rear wings forming two stable yards. In the centre is a porte-cochère with a pedimented archway surmounted by a ball-head finial and a lantern. There are two more archways with segmental heads, and in the walls are ventilation holes in lozenge patterns.	II
Broughton Farm House; 52.52130°N 2.28806°W	—	Late 18th to early 19th century	A brick farmhouse with a moulded eaves cornice, and a tile roof with coped gables. It has three storeys and three bays. The doorway has a moulded surround and an entablature, and the windows are sashes.	II
Ivy House; 52.53731°N 2.30623°W	—	Late 18th to early 19th century	A brick house with a sandstone plinth at the rear, a dentil cornice and a hipped tile roof. There are three storeys and a basement, a front of one bay, and at the rear is a staircase tower and a one-storey wing. All the openings have segmental heads, and most of the windows are sashes, with one casement window at the rear.	II
Woodman Inn; 52.54795°N 2.28089°W		Late 18th to early 19th century	The public house is in brick and has a tile roof with coped gables. There are three storeys and a front of three bays. The windows are sashes, and the doorway has reeded jambs and a pedimented hood.	II
Chyknell; 52.53674°N 2.32965°W		1814	A stuccoed country house with a slate roof. It has two storeys and a symmetrical front, with a central range of three bays and projecting outer wings with pedimented gables. Across the front is a colonnade of unfluted Greek Doric columns. The windows are sashes, and on the left return is a full-height canted bay window.	II
2–4 Claverley Bull Ring; 52.53824°N 2.30648°W		Early 19th century	A row of three cottages incorporating earlier material, they are in brick on a stone plinth, and have dentil eaves and tile roofs. They have two storeys and three bays each, and the windows are sashes with segmental heads. Nos. 2 and 3 have a bracketed hood above the doorway, and No. 4 has a pediment. There is exposed timber framing at the rear of No. 3.	II
12 and 13 High Street; 52.53710°N 2.30571°W	—	Early 19th century	A pair of red brick houses that have tiled roofs with coped gables. They have casement windows with cambered heads, a small shop window, and a doorway with a moulded surround and pilasters. In front are wrought iron railings and a gate.	II
Clarecott; 52.53760°N 2.30707°W	—	Early 19th century	A brick house with a tile roof, two storeys and three bays. The doorway has a moulded surround with pilasters, a segmental fanlight, and a gabled hood, and the windows are casements with cambered heads.	II
Clifton Cottage; 52.54810°N 2.28153°W	—	Early 19th century	A brick house with a hipped slate roof. It has two storeys, and a front of three bays. The doorway has a fanlight and a pedimented hood on brackets, and the windows are sashes.	II
Plough Inn; 52.53730°N 2.30564°W		Early 19th century	The public house is in brick with a tile roof, and incorporates earlier timber framing in the left gable end. It has one storey and attics, a central range, and projecting gabled wings at both ends. In the central range are two gabled dormers.	II
Upper Ludstone Farm House; 52.55482°N 2.29341°W	—	Early 19th century	The farmhouse is in brick with a tile roof. There are two storeys, three bays, and a lower left wing. The doorway has a pediment, and the windows are casements.	II
Woodfield House; 52.54260°N 2.30470°W	—	Early 19th century	A brick house with a hipped slate roof. It has two storeys, an L-shaped plan, and a front of three bays. The windows are sashes, and there is a wood and metal verandah.	II
Aston Cottage; 52.54304°N 2.28107°W	—	Early to mid 19th century	A brick house with a slate roof, two storeys, and three bays, the central bay projecting under a gable. The central doorway has a moulded surround and a square fanlight with radial tracery. The windows are sashes. In front of the garden are iron railings and a gate.	II
Aston; 52.53847°N 2.28327°W	—	19th century	A brick house with a timber framed core, it has a band, corbelled eaves, and a tile roof with coped gables. There are two storeys, and the windows are casements, the three in the upper floor being gabled. In the left gable end are exposed ceiling beams and a foliated plaster cornice.	II
Gatacre Park; 52.50126°N 2.31248°W	—	Mid 19th century	A country house in red brick with stone dressings, string courses, and an eaves cornice. It has two storeys and a front of five bays, the outer bays projecting slightly. The porch bay has a parapet, and contains a round-arched doorway with engaged columns and an entablature. The windows are sashes with moulded architraves, those in the ground floor with cornice hoods on consoles. At the rear is a large semicircular bay window, and to the north is a three-storey service wing.	II
Lychgate; 52.53798°N 2.30678°W		19th century (probable)	The lychgate at the entrance to the churchyard of All Saints Church is attached to the vicarage. It has an outer wall of brick and a tile roof. The gable ends have applied timber framing with plaster infill.	II
The Dairy House; 52.54674°N 2.29707°W	—	1854	A brick house with a hipped tile roof, two storeys and a symmetrical front of three bays. The windows are sashes, and there is a small gabled porch.	II
Aston Hall; 52.53971°N 2.28512°W	—	Mid to late 19th century	A red brick house that has a tile roof with coped gables. There are three storeys and a symmetrical front of three bays. In the centre is a porch and a doorway with a plain surround, the outer bays project slightly and are gabled, and the windows are mullioned and transomed.	II
Walls, gates and gate piers, Ludstone Hall; 52.54715°N 2.29634°W		Mid to late 19th century	The walls are in sandstone, they surround the south, east and west sides of the garden, and flank the main drive. At the entrance to the drive are four ashlar piers, each with a cornice cap and an acorn finial. Between them is a balustrade with open strapwork and a pair of wrought iron gates.	II
Lodge, Ludstone Hall; 52.54719°N 2.29614°W		1873	The lodge, in Jacobean style, is in brick with stone dressings, quoins, and a tile roof with shaped coped gables and ball finials. There is one storey, an L-shaped plan, and a porch with arched openings in the angle. In the south gable end is a mullioned and transomed window with an architrave and a moulded cornice surmounted by scrollwork.	II
Chyknell War Memorial and gates 52.53710°N 2.31435°W		Before 1926	The war memorial stands at the entrance to the Chyknell Estate in a small square garden. It consists of a gabled timber triptych with a shingle roof, on a square sandstone plinth, on a square sandstone base. Under the gable is a relief carving of angels holding an inscribed shield. Below this are three hardwood panels, the outer ones folding and inscribed with dates, and on the middle panel are the names of those lost in the First World War. On the reverse are four inscribed metal plaques. The garden is entered by three sandstone steps and through two inscribed wooden gates.	II
