= Claverley =

Village in Shropshire, England

Coordinates: 52.538°N 2.306°W

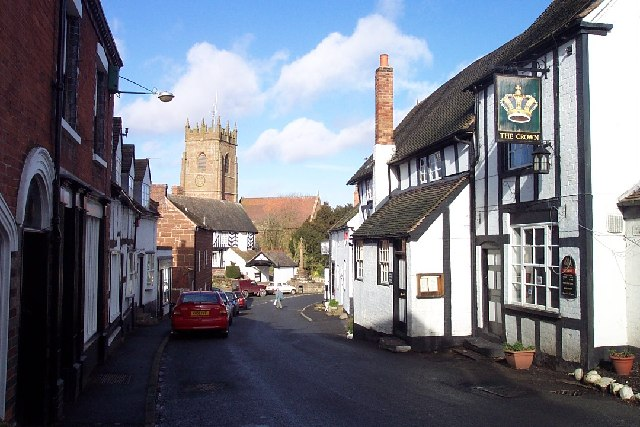
- Claverley, Shropshire

- Location within Shropshire
- Population: 1,620 (2011 Census)
- OS grid reference: SO792934
- Civil parish: Claverley
- Unitary authority: Shropshire
- Ceremonial county: Shropshire
- Region: West Midlands
- Country: England
- Sovereign state: United Kingdom
- Post town: Wolverhampton
- Postcode district: WV5
- Dialling code: 01746
- Police: West Mercia
- Fire: Shropshire
- Ambulance: West Midlands
- UK Parliament: South Shropshire

Claverley is a village and civil parish in east Shropshire, England. The parish also includes the hamlets of Beobridge, Hopstone, Upper Aston, Ludstone, Heathton and a number of other small settlements.

Claverley village is east of the market town of Bridgnorth, near the Staffordshire county boundary. The village has two public houses, The Plough and The Crown. Originally there were three pubs (top middle and bottom) however the bottom pub was converted into apartments after closing in the late 2010s.

On the edge of the village is the Arts and Crafts style mansion, Brook House; it was built in 1937 for the Gibbons family, who made their money as lock and window merchants in Wolverhampton.

== Church ==
The Church of England parish church of All Saints dates from the 11th century and has a rare 13th-century wall painting. On the north side of the nave, and dated to around 1200, a frieze of painted scenes some 50 feet (15 m) long shows a series of 15 knights in armour, mostly engaged in single combat. It has been suggested that this portrays scenes from the 5th-century poem Psychomachia, a battle between virtues and vices, by Prudentius. A recent theory is that the knight with the horn is Roland (the only surviving medieval mural of this hero) and that the Holy Cross is the unifying theme of the mural scheme.

There are also a number of tombs of the Gatacre family, who dominated the parish from the Middle Ages to the early 20th century. In the Tudor period they were closely associated with religiously conservative and recusant circles. The chapels in the church were originally their private preserve.

== Notable people ==
- Sir Robert Broke (died 1558), Tudor-era judge and politician was son of a Claverley family and has tomb in Claverley Church.
- Thomas Gatacre (died 1593), politician, later Protestant cleric, member of family seated at Gatacre in Claverley parish.
- Lieutenant-General Sir William Forbes Gatacre KCB DSO (1843–1906) was a son of the family seated at Gatacre.
- Mary Whitehouse CBE (1910–2001), the TV/radio clean-up campaigner, lived in Claverley at time she set up the National Viewers and Listeners Association in 1965, using her home as its office.
- Gerry Harris (1935–2020), professional footballer for Wolves and Walsall, was born at Claverley.
- Jay Blades MBE (born 1970), furniture restorer and TV presenter, lives in Claverley.

== See also ==
- Listed buildings in Claverley
