= Robert Broke =

English judge and politician (died 1558)

The Right Honourable Sir Robert Broke MP
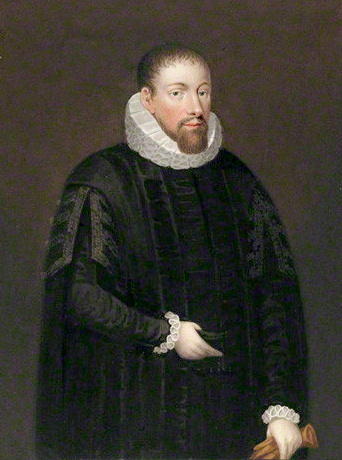

Chief Justice of the Common Pleas
- In office 1554–1558
- Monarch: Mary I
- Preceded by: Richard Morgan
- Succeeded by: Anthony Brown

Speaker of the House of Commons
- In office 2 April 1554 – 5 May 1554
- Monarch: Mary I
- Preceded by: John Pollard
- Succeeded by: Clement Higham

Personal details
- Born: c. 1515
- Died: 5 or 6 September 1558 Patshull Hall
- Resting place: All Saints Church, Claverley
- Parent(s): Thomas Broke; Margaret Grosvenor
- Education: Oxford University

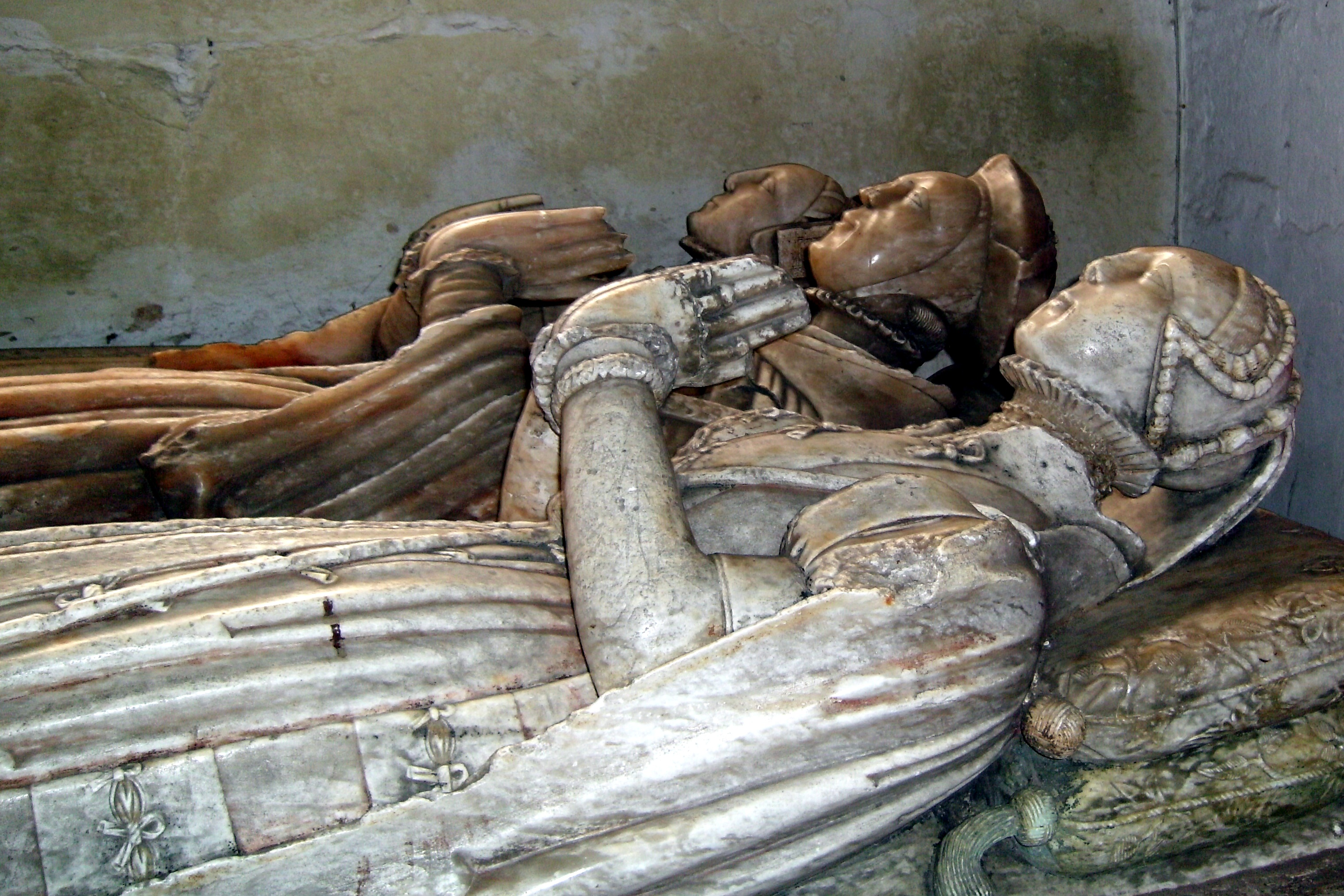
Tomb of Robert Broke and of his wives, Anne Waring and Dorothy Gatacre, in the Gatacre chapel, All Saints Church, Claverley, Shropshire

Sir Robert Broke SL (c. 1515 – 5 or 6 September 1558) was an English judge, politician and legal writer. Although a landowner in rural Shropshire, he made his fortune through more than 20 years' service to the City of London. MP for the City in five parliaments, he served as Speaker of the House of Commons in 1554. He is celebrated as the author of one of the Books of authority. A prominent religious conservative, he founded a notable recusant dynasty. His surname is also rendered Brooke, and occasionally Brook, which are, for modern readers, better indicators of pronunciation.

== Early life and education ==
Robert Broke was born by 1515: his known Oxford University admission date suggests the first decade of the century. He was the eldest son of

- Thomas Broke of Claverley in Shropshire.
- Margaret Grosvenor, daughter of Humphrey Grosvenor of Farmcote, a hamlet to the south-east of Claverley.

Most of early 16th century Shropshire was poor and underdeveloped sheep country, ruled by the Council of Wales and the Marches. Claverley was a large parish, dominated by the Gatacre family, whose seat was at its southern edge.

Broke was admitted to study for a BA at Oxford University in 1521. As a very minor member of the landed gentry, Broke needed to seek sources of income outside his own locality if he were to prosper, and he did so through London and the law. He studied at Strand Inn, and from there was admitted to Middle Temple at some point between 1525 and 1528. He studied pleading with John Jenour, a famous Prothonotary who influenced a whole generation of judges and jurists.

== Judicial career ==
Broke enjoyed considerable power as an official of the City of London before attaining high office in the last four years of his life. He was also the author of several important works on the law.

=== Offices held ===
Broke's judicial career began in 1536 when he was appointed Common Serjeant of London on the recommendation of Henry VIII and the queen, Jane Seymour; how he gained such royal favour is unknown. As Serjeant, Brooke attended court with the Lord Mayor of London, as well as the Court of Aldermen and the Court of Common Council, the city's main deliberative body. One of his tasks was to review, rewrite and put forward parliamentary bills proposed by the city. In 1540, Broke identified and returned a volume of the Letter-Books of the City of London that had been lost for some time. In January 1544, he was directed to intervene in the passage of two bills: one from the secondaries of the compter, aiming to repeal the Act against untrue verdicts; another already put to the house that intended to prevent merchants buying steel and other goods, which Broke was told to forestall. In 1545, it was a bill to bring urban sanctuaries under the control of borough and city authorities.

Among the legal officers, the Common Serjeant was second only to the Recorder of London. When this post became vacant in 1545, a letter from the king to the Aldermen once again proved decisive in securing it for Broke, and he took office on 12 November. On 17 November he was elected to parliament in place of his predecessor as Recorder, Sir Roger Cholmley. On 19 November he was granted Freedom of the City of London, a status tied to his membership of the Worshipful Company of Mercers, the first in order of precedence of London's Livery Companies.

Holding these public offices did not prevent Broke pursuing private practice, and his signature is found on bills in chancery in the 1530s and 1540s. During this time he was also deputy chief steward for the Duchy of Lancaster, and was created a Serjeant-at-law in 1552.

On 8 October 1554 he was appointed Chief Justice of the Common Pleas, probably a reward from Queen Mary for his performance as Speaker of the House of Commons. He was knighted on 27 January 1555 by King Philip. On 26 February, he presided over the trial of Charles Stourton, 8th Baron Stourton, accused of murdering two men, William Hartgill and his son John. Stourton refused to plead and Broke threatened him with the punishment of being pressed to death. He then entered a plea of guilty and was executed on 16 March.

Broke fell into conflict with the court's Puisne Justices when he appointed Thomas Gatacre, his wife's brother, as Chief Prothonotary in 1557. The justices rejected him, and Broke's second choice, William Wheteley, was then allowed to take office despite judicial preference for another candidate.

=== Works ===
In 1542 Broke became a bencher at the Middle Temple. As Autumn Reader that year, his subject was the 1540 Statute of Limitations; the reading circulated in manuscript and was subsequently printed in 1647 (The reading of that famous lawyer Sr. Robert Brook Kt. upon the statute of limitations, 32. H.8.cap.2. ESTC R24091). As Lent Reader in 1551, his subject was Pleas of the Crown, using chapter 17 of Magna Carta as the source: this also circulated in manuscript before being published in 1641, almost one hundred years after his death.

Broke's most important work was La Graunde Abridgement, a classified compendium of law as it then prevailed. Modelled on a work of the same name by Anthony Fitzherbert, with which it is sometimes confused, it closely reflected Broke's own interests and experience. A section is given over to the subject of London, great stress is placed on the role of parliament and it contains numerous cases in which Broke appeared. The book was not published until 1568, a decade after Broke's death, and was in Law French, but it was an immediate success and came to be regarded as one of the Books of authority which courts can use as evidence of the law prevailing at the time. From it Richard Bellewe extracted important cases decided during the reigns of Henry VIII, Edward VI and Mary I and issued them as a separate compilation, soon rendered into English, and often cited as Brook's New Cases. This proved even more popular than the book from which it was extracted.

== Political career ==
Broke served as a Member of Parliament for the City of London from 1545 until 1554, serving as Speaker of the House of Commons of England in 1554.

=== Parliament of 1545 ===
Broke was elected to the Parliament of 1545, the last of Henry VIII's reign, as a replacement for Sir Roger Cholmley. The parliament had been called as long ago as December 1544 and Cholmley was elected to Parliament on 19 January 1545. However, the opening of parliament was delayed until 23 November and Cholmley was appointed an Exchequer Baron in the meantime, and so forced to relinquish both his post as Recorder and his parliamentary seat.

London had four MPs. Two, called knights, were elected by the Aldermen, and one of these was always the Recorder. The other two, called burgesses were elected by the Court of Common Council from a list of twelve proposed by the Aldermen. The Recorder always resigned his seat when he left office: hence Broke's election was automatic. London was second only to the Crown as sponsor of legislation and solid legal acumen was in need at all times among its delegation to the House of Commons.

Broke's colleagues in the 1545 parliament were Sir Richard Gresham, a former Lord Mayor, John Sturgeon, a staunch Protestant, and Paul Withypoll, a wealthy merchant with interests in the Netherlands, Spain and Crete. Much of their work involved defending the City against the claims of its clergy. They were unsuccessful in getting their bill on sanctuaries through the House, but they were able to force a compromise over a bill intended to tighten up tithe collection from the citizens. Such manoeuvring was typical of the concerns of London members in the Tudor period.

=== Parliament of 1547 ===
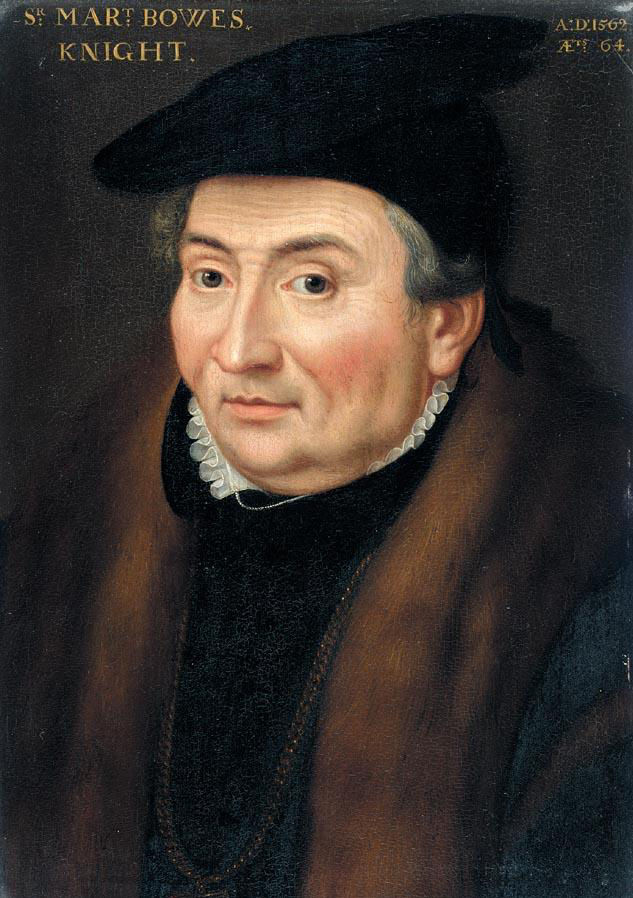
Sir Martin Bowes, one of Broke's colleagues as MP for London.

The first Parliament of Edward VI lasted for most of the reign, and Broke was automatically returned to it. His aldermanic colleague was the goldsmith Sir Martin Bowes, who had just served his term as Lord Mayor, having made so large a fortune at the Royal Mint that he was able easily to afford the £10,000 to settle accounts when he and the other masters were found to have systematically debased the coinage. Bowes remained a London MP throughout Broke's term, apart from a short break in 1553. The first session of the parliament definitively abolished chantries. A major concern of the London members in the second and subsequent sessions of the parliament was to ensure that the City did not lose control of the wealth of the chantries within its boundaries to the king. Broke, who had been appointed commissioner for chantries in London, Westminster and Middlesex in 1546, during an earlier and abortive move toward abolition, must have had first-hand knowledge of the subject. The London members also wrestled with an Act to release fee farms for three years to ensure that London got the best terms from it. Broke was told to work closely with one of the burgesses, who had specialist knowledge of the subject. The other burgess, Thomas Curteys, was elected an alderman in 1551 – a move which he resisted to the point of imprisonment and which forced him to resign his seat in parliament. In 1552 Broke was sent to lobby for further assurances from the Crown about lands recently purchased by the city.

Broke was not limited to purely metropolitan concerns: as a skilled lawyer and draftsman, his talents were useful to the Crown and its ministers, and he was called upon by others if they thought his skills could benefit their cause. In 1549, he was given responsibility for a bill "for preaching divers opinions." The third session of the parliament passed an Act to reform canon law and Broke was appointed to the commission set up for this purpose on 12 February 1552. In March 1552 he was one of those deputed to the redraft the Treason Act 1551 to make it illegal to say that the king "is an heretic, schismatic, infidel or usurper of the crown." He was one of those enlisted in 1549 by the supporters of Henry Clifford, 2nd Earl of Cumberland, whose family had long held the shrievalty of Westmorland by hereditary right: the supporters of his neighbour Thomas Wharton, 1st Baron Wharton, were proposing to end the arrangement. He was also called in by John de Vere, 16th Earl of Oxford in 1552 to advise on legislation he was promoting to free himself of commitments made to Edward Seymour, 1st Duke of Somerset, the disgraced and executed former Lord Protector.

=== Parliament of March 1553 ===
Broke and Bowes were sent to the last parliament of Edward VI's reign, along with two burgesses: Curteys's replacement, John Blundell, and John Marshe – both Protestants and particularly long-serving MPs. The parliament met as the succession question loomed large and lasted for only the month of March 1553. However, the London delegation were initially more concerned with their campaign to get the use of fuel in London better regulated – in which they succeeded through the passage of an Act.

However, Broke was soon given the question of the Maidstone election to investigate, and this was perhaps a result of the succession crisis. The town had been granted a charter of incorporation in 1549. An election was called as soon as the parliament was summoned, but there was no reference to parliamentary representation in the charter. Broke was joined in his work by Richard Morgan, a fellow judge and MP for Gloucester, as well as a fellow Catholic. They were enjoined by parliament to "peruse the charter of Maidstone ... whether they may have burgesses in this House; and in the meantime the burgesses there to be absent out of this House till it be fully ordered." It was possible that supporters of John Dudley, 1st Duke of Northumberland had used Maidstone's ambiguous status as a way of increasing parliamentary support for Lady Jane Grey's succession, as the town was in the Protestant heartland of Kent. In fact, the lord of the manor was Thomas Wyatt, the High Sheriff of Kent who made the return was Sir John Guildford, a cousin of Dudley's wife, and one of the burgesses elected was a relative of both Dudley and Jane Grey. It is unclear what Broke and Morgan reported, or even if they delivered their report, but Maidstone was disfranchised and did not regain the right to parliamentary representation until it was granted by a new charter 1559.

=== Parliaments of Mary I ===
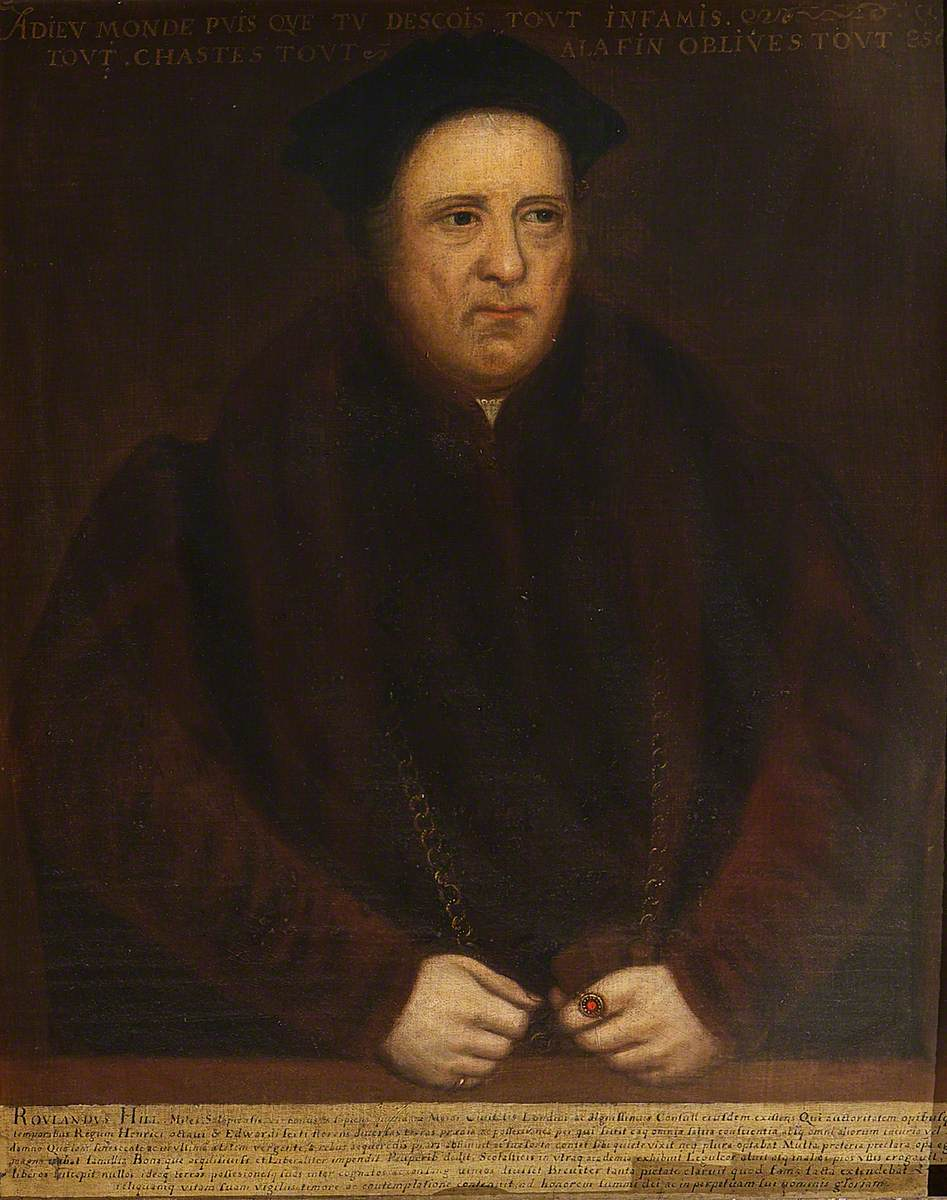
Sir Rowland Hill replaced Bows as an MP for London.

For the parliament of October 1553 Bowes was temporarily replaced by Sir Rowland Hill, a former Lord Mayor and a Protestant, making Broke the only Catholic MP from London. Despite this, and the momentous events of the summer, in which Dudley attempted to place Jane Grey on the throne and was defeated by a rebellion in favour of Mary, Edward's Catholic elder sister, the London delegation attended the parliament with an entirely commercial agenda. They toiled away at legislation to regulate London's physicians, chandlers in both wax and tallow, leather tanners and bowling alleys, as well as a measure to deregulate the sale of wine. However, the Crown took initial steps to undo the Edwardian Reformation. One of the key measures protecting it was the Treason Act, which Broke had helped to redraft. After a bill to repeal it had passed its second reading, it was given to Broke to review and steer through its final stages.

The parliament of April 1554 had a much stronger commission to further the Marian Counter-Reformation: "for corroboration of true religion, and touching the Queen's highness most noble marriage" to Philip II of Spain. Broke attended with Bowes, Blundell and Marshe. At the assembly of the parliament Broke was elected speaker, probably with royal support. The parliament was dissolved after only a month. The Speaker's main task was to steer through a bill, dear to many members, to protect those who had profited from the dissolution of the monasteries from ecclesiastical censure. This he did competently, although the bill was defeated in the House of Lords. The main measures proposed by the Crown, most importantly those relating to the Queen's marriage, were carried expeditiously. Broke's conduct as Speaker seems to have been the main factor influencing the Queen to open up opportunities within the judiciary. He was appointed Chief Justice of Common Pleas after the summoning of the next parliament but before it assembled. This forced him to resign the recordership, and thus his Commons seat.

== Landowner ==
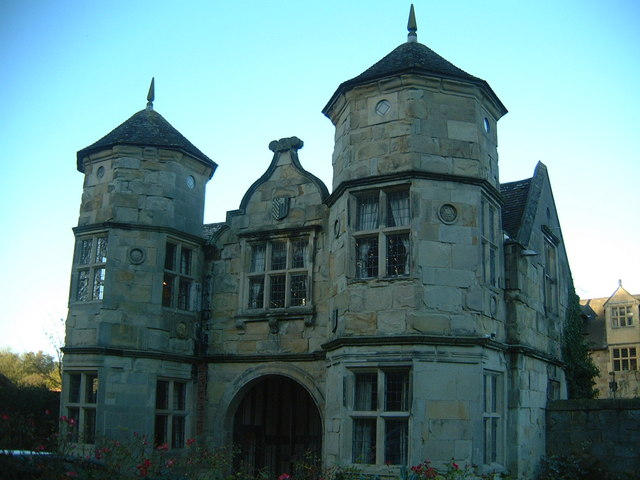
Madeley Court, the manor house built on the Madeley estate by Broke's descendants. The gatehouse was probably built by John or Basil Brooke. The Court is now a hotel.

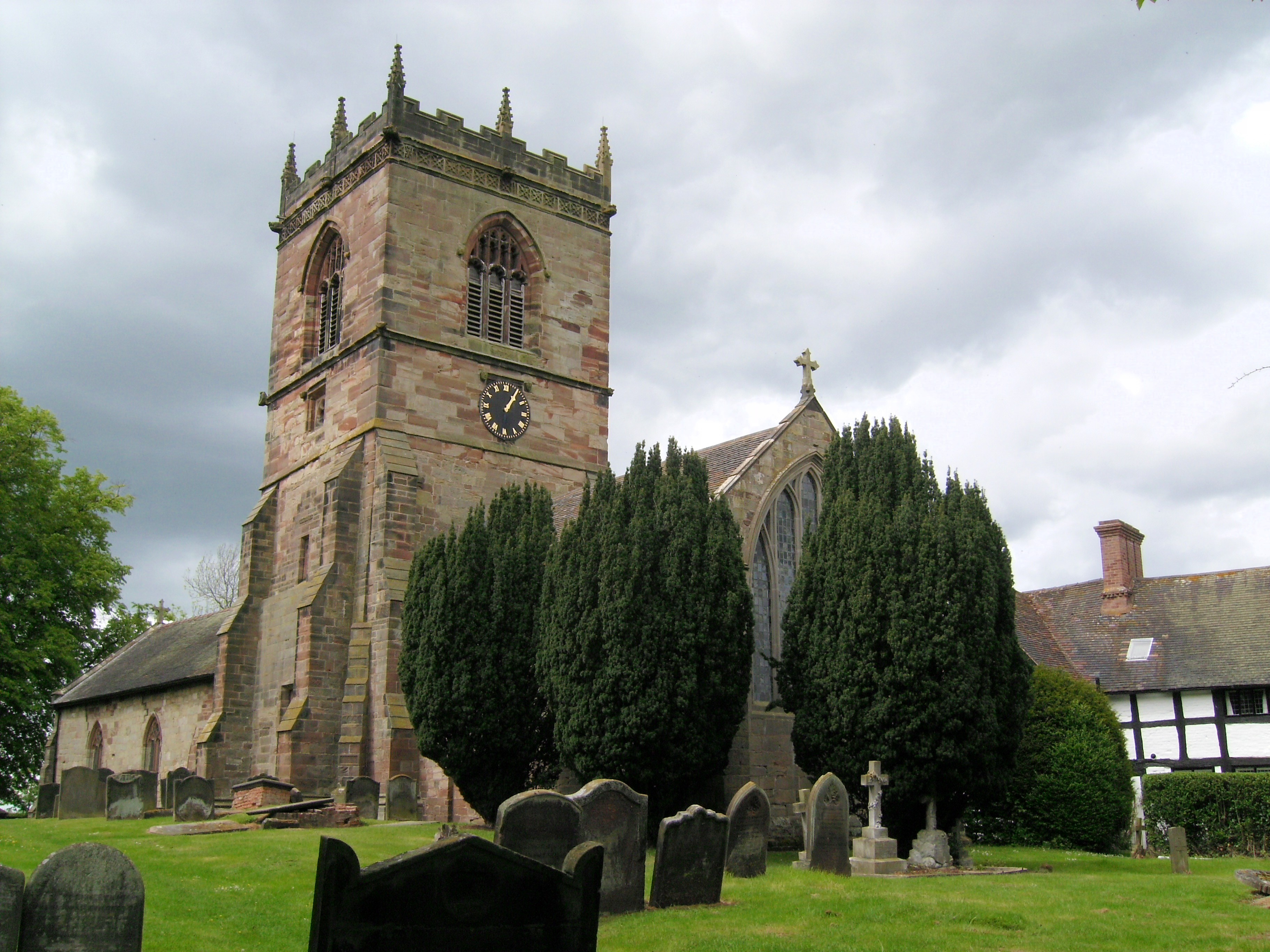
All Saints Church, Lapley. Much of the building goes back to the 12th century, around the time the priory was established, and the priory had advowson of the church. A timber-framed manor house, behind the church, replaced the priory in the mid-16th century. Broke bought the estate to settle on his second wife, Dorothy Gatacre.

Broke's family had been decidedly minor landowners in and around Claverley. However, his career gave him the contacts and wealth to expand his holdings greatly. He was able to purchase land and rights expropriated through the dissolution of the monasteries in the reign of Henry VIII and the abolition of chantries and colleges in the reiign of Edward VI.

Most important for Broke's family was the acquisition of the manor of Madeley, Shropshire, which had been the closest demesne estate of Wenlock Priory. After passing back to the Crown in 1540 on the dissolution of the priory, it was purchased by Broke in 1544 and held as half a knight's fee. For two centuries Madeley was to be the seat of the Brooke family, famous or notorious for their royalist plotting during the English Civil War and Commonwealth. In the same year, Broke also bought the advowson of the parish church. and in 1549 the property of St Mary's guild, a lay fraternity that had tended the Lady chapel. He even purchased the pension that the rector of Badger, Shropshire had paid to Wenlock Madeley's mineral wealth was already partly apparent: there had been coal mining since the 14th century and there was already an iron ore working rented out when Broke bought the manor. It was to prove one of the focal points of England's Industrial Revolution.

In 1548 Broke bought the manor of Lapley from Sir Richard Manners. Formerly the demesne estate of Lapley Priory, this had been granted by Henry V to the College of St Bartholomew, Tong, Shropshire, which was the shrine church of the Vernon family of Haddon Hall. Manners acquired it at the abolition of colleges and chantries and was now in a position to sell this former church property for ready cash. Broke settled Lapley on his second wife, Dorothy Gatacre, at their marriage and she obtained it on his death.

Broke's family resided generally in Shropshire. He visited Shropshire periodically to meet family and friends, but most of the time lived in one of his London houses, at Carter Lane or in Putney.

== Religious beliefs ==
Opinions on Broke's religious beliefs differ only in degree. The History of Parliament says: "There seems no doubt that Broke was a Catholic." The 1904 Dictionary of National Biography quotes, without attribution, the description "zealous Catholic," which the Victoria County History account of his chief manor echoes with the more disparaging "zealous papist." In 1548, it was reported that Broke and Clement Smith, MP for Maldon, smiled and laughed "when they heard the priest at St. Gregory's by Paul's at his prayers at mass pray God to send the Council grace to turn from their erroneous opinions that they were in", although the allegation was later withdrawn.

Broke's religious conservatism was a persistent theme of his life. He had served as commissioner for heresies for London in 1541, when Henry VIII's final persecution of Protestants was launched. The commission to Edmund Bonner, the Bishop of London is faithfully preserved in Foxe's Book of Martyrs, with a list of the names of those whose oaths were to be taken, including notably Broke himself, Cholmley and Gresham. However, in common with the Shropshire and Staffordshire gentry circle in which he moved, Broke showed no great sympathy for the power and wealth of the clergy. He worked to limit the power of the London clergy and later readily accepted lands expropriated from monasteries and chantries, using his power as Speaker to attempt to secure the purchases.

Broke's attitude was generally strictly professional: he was willing to use his legal skills on behalf of employers or clients, irrespective of their religious inclinations or intentions, so it is never entirely safe to read his beliefs from his actions. Hence he worked on both the passage and the repeal of the 1551 Treason Act, which specifically forbade religious criticism of Edward VI. It was never likely that he would appear on the October 1553 Crown Office list of MPs as one of "those which stood for the true religion," in this case, Protestant. Only 60 names are marked, although they include two colleagues, Blundell and Marshe.

Broke married within his own Catholic regional circle: the Gatacres were to become mainly recusants, as were his own descendants.

== Death ==
Broke's inquisition post mortem records that he died on 5 September 1558 at Patshull Hall. However, his tomb inscription says that he died on 6 September, while "visiting his friends and country". The discrepancy is small and it is possible he died in the night, with the precise moment unknown. He was buried in Claverley Church. His chest tomb bears his effigy, clad in his gown of office, lying between his two wives, with his children in miniature around the sides. It is by far the finest tomb in the church.

The Broke tomb in All Saints Church, Claverley

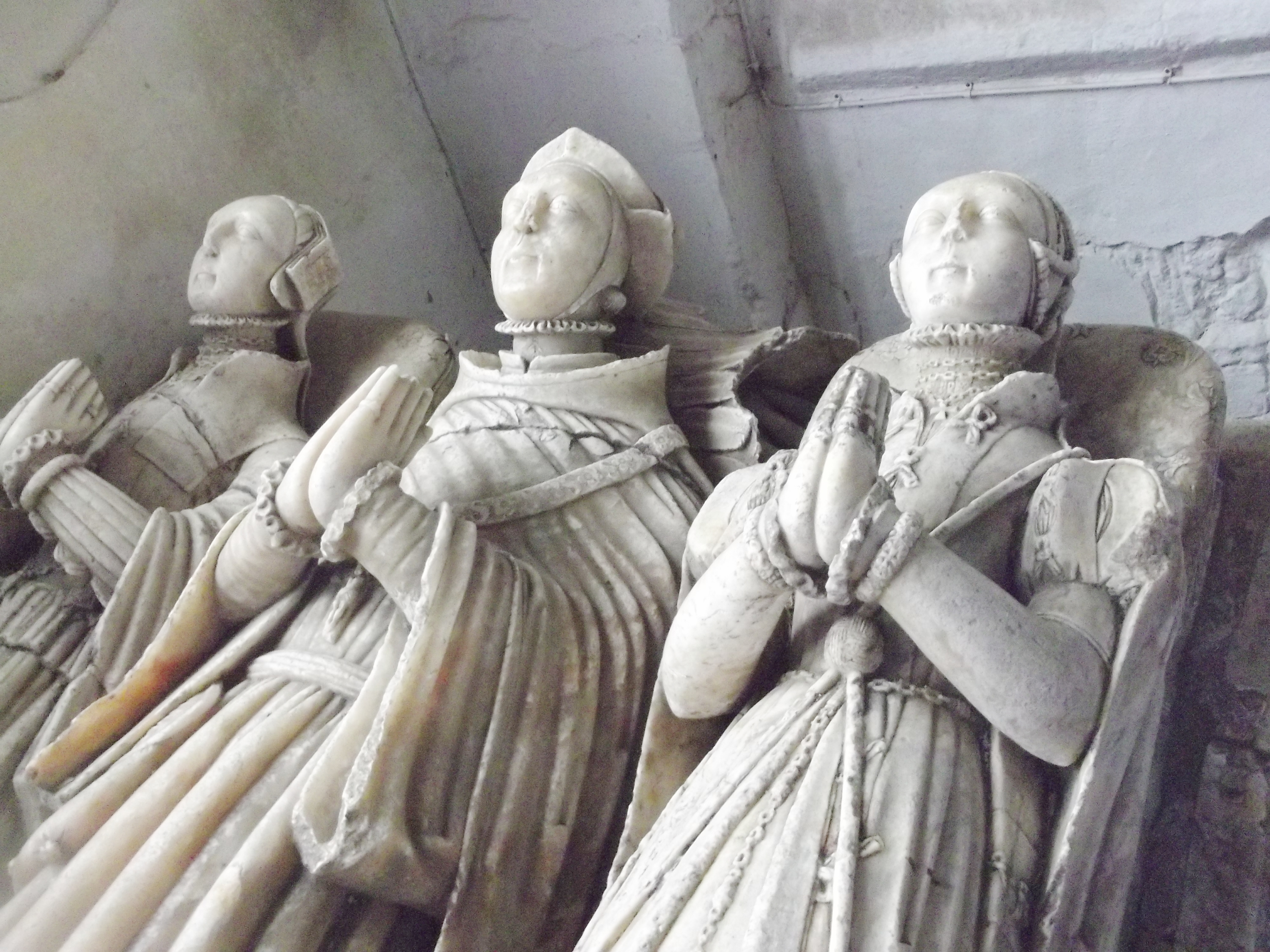
Effigies of Sir Robert Broke, Anne Waring, his first wife, and Dorothy Gatacre, his second wife

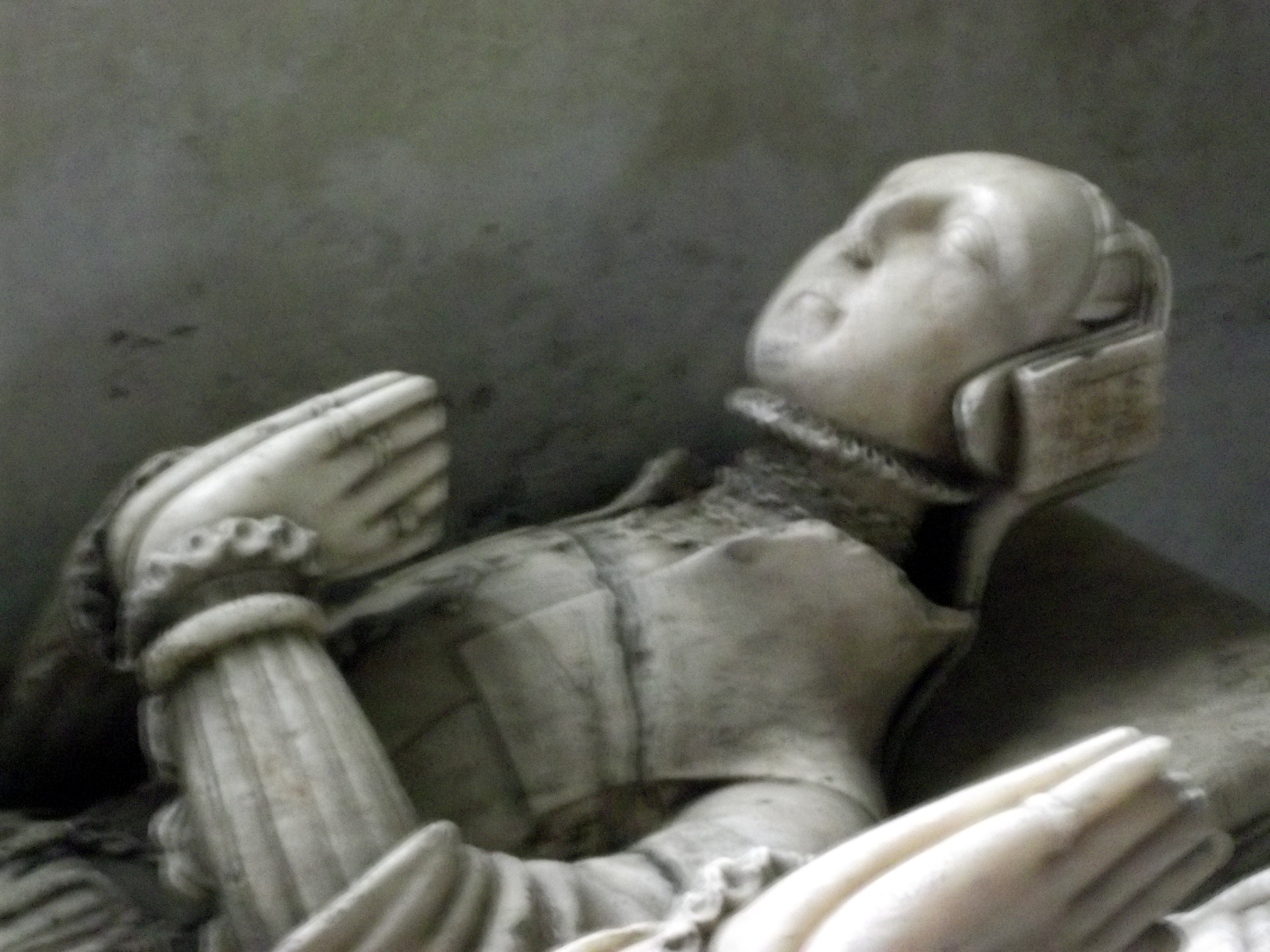
Anne Waring, first wife of Robert Broke

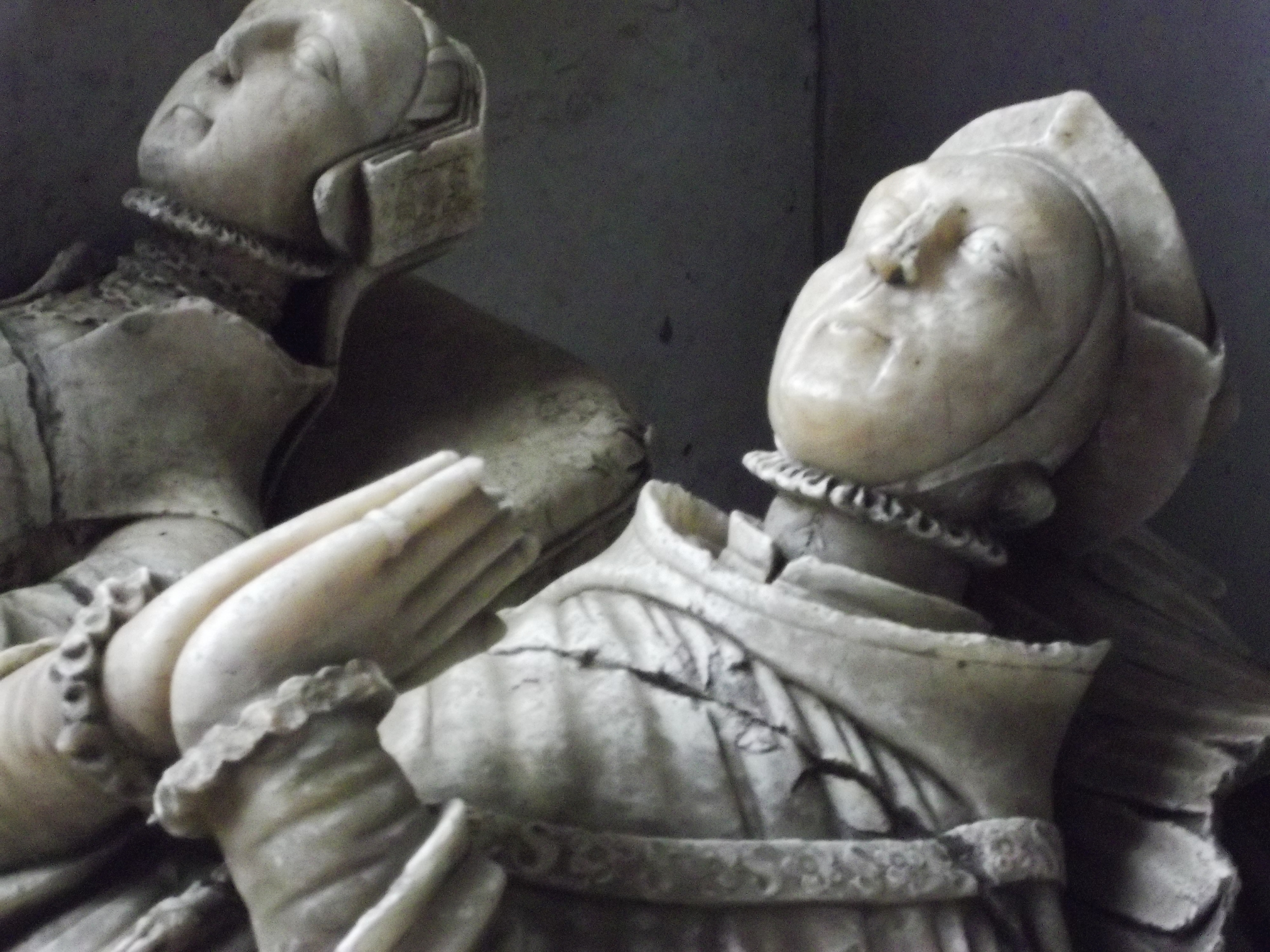
Dorothy Gatacre, second wife of Robert Broke

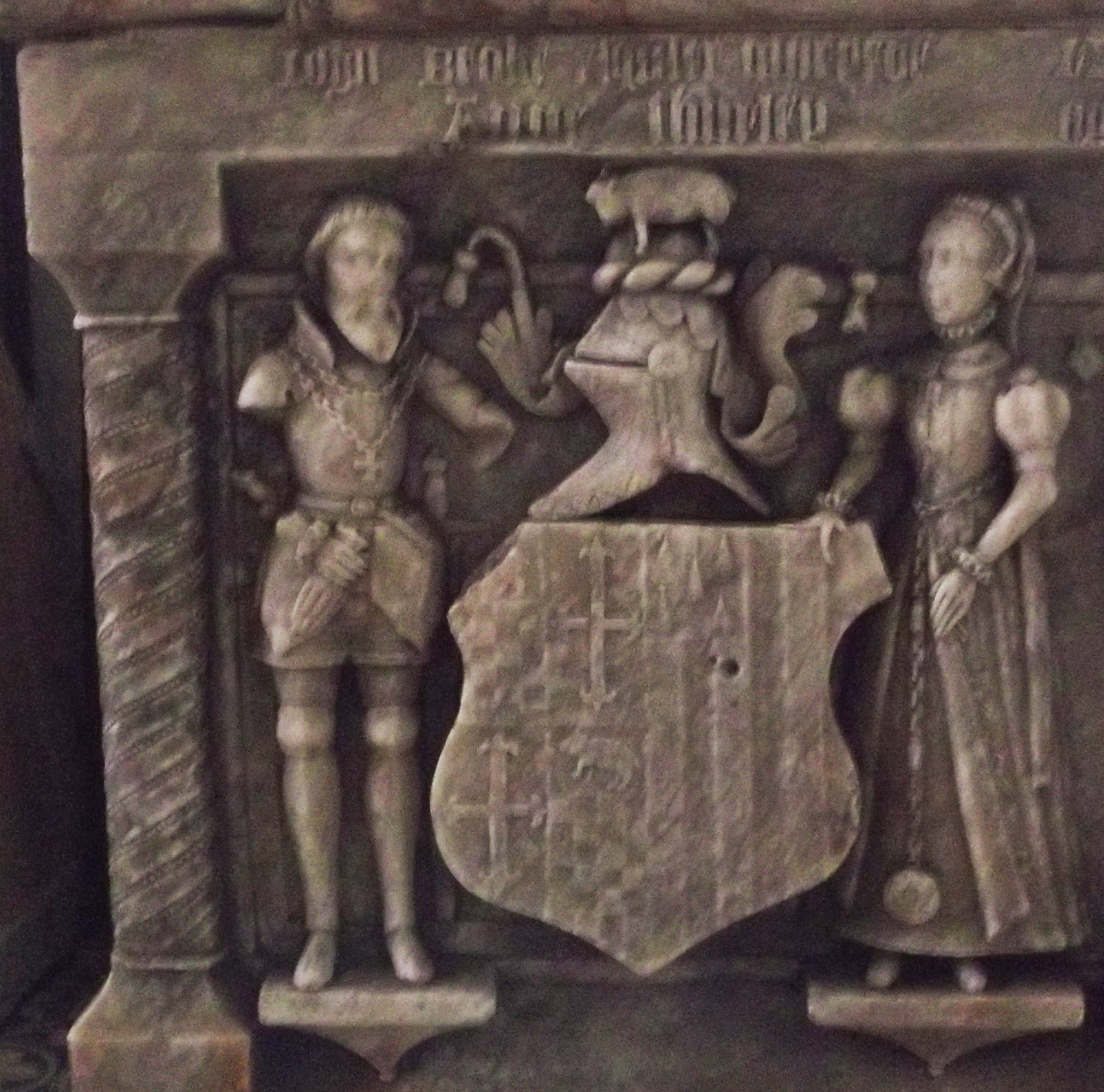
Robert Broke and his first wife, Anne, with their arms

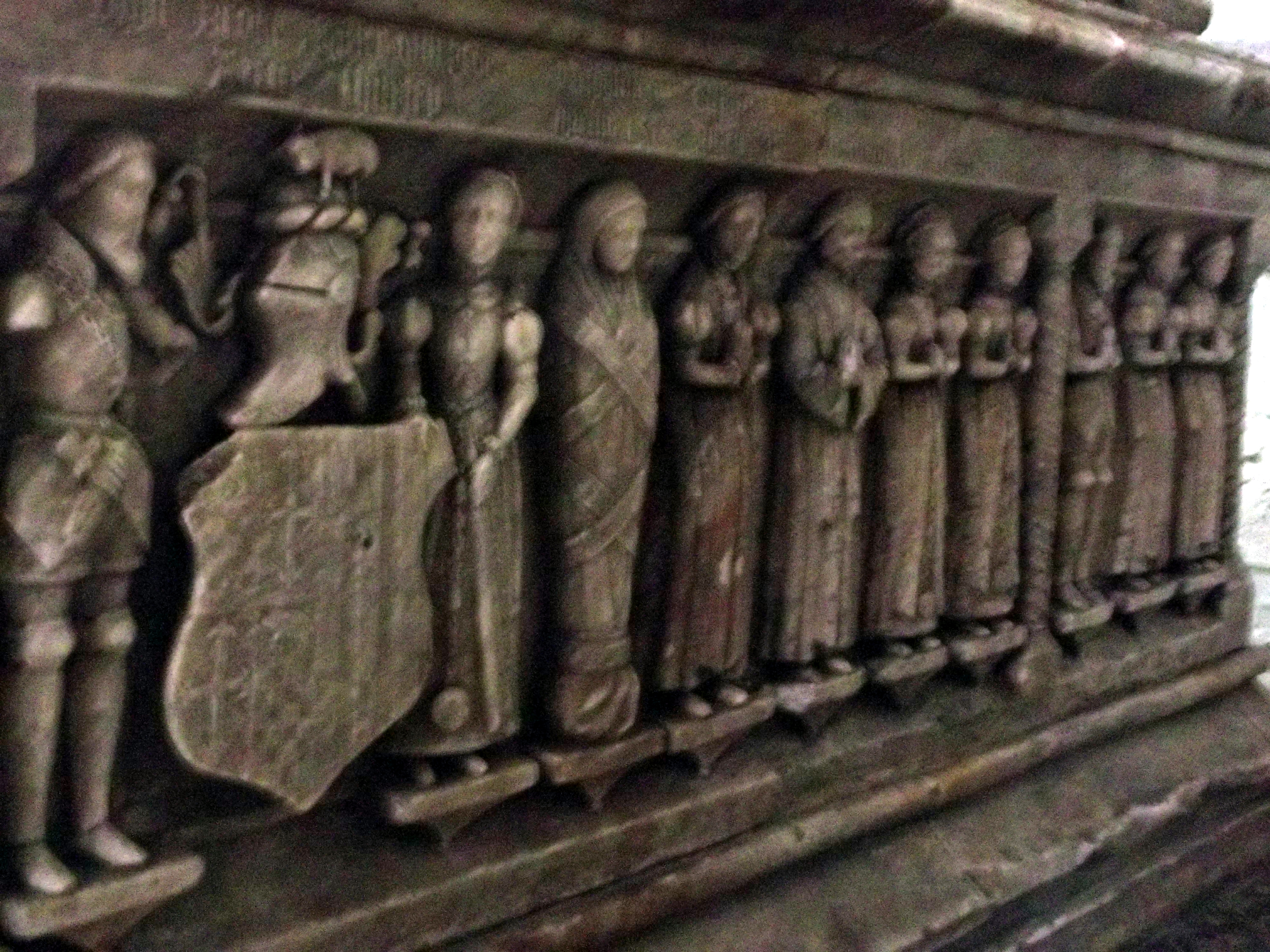
Robert Broke and Anne Waring with children

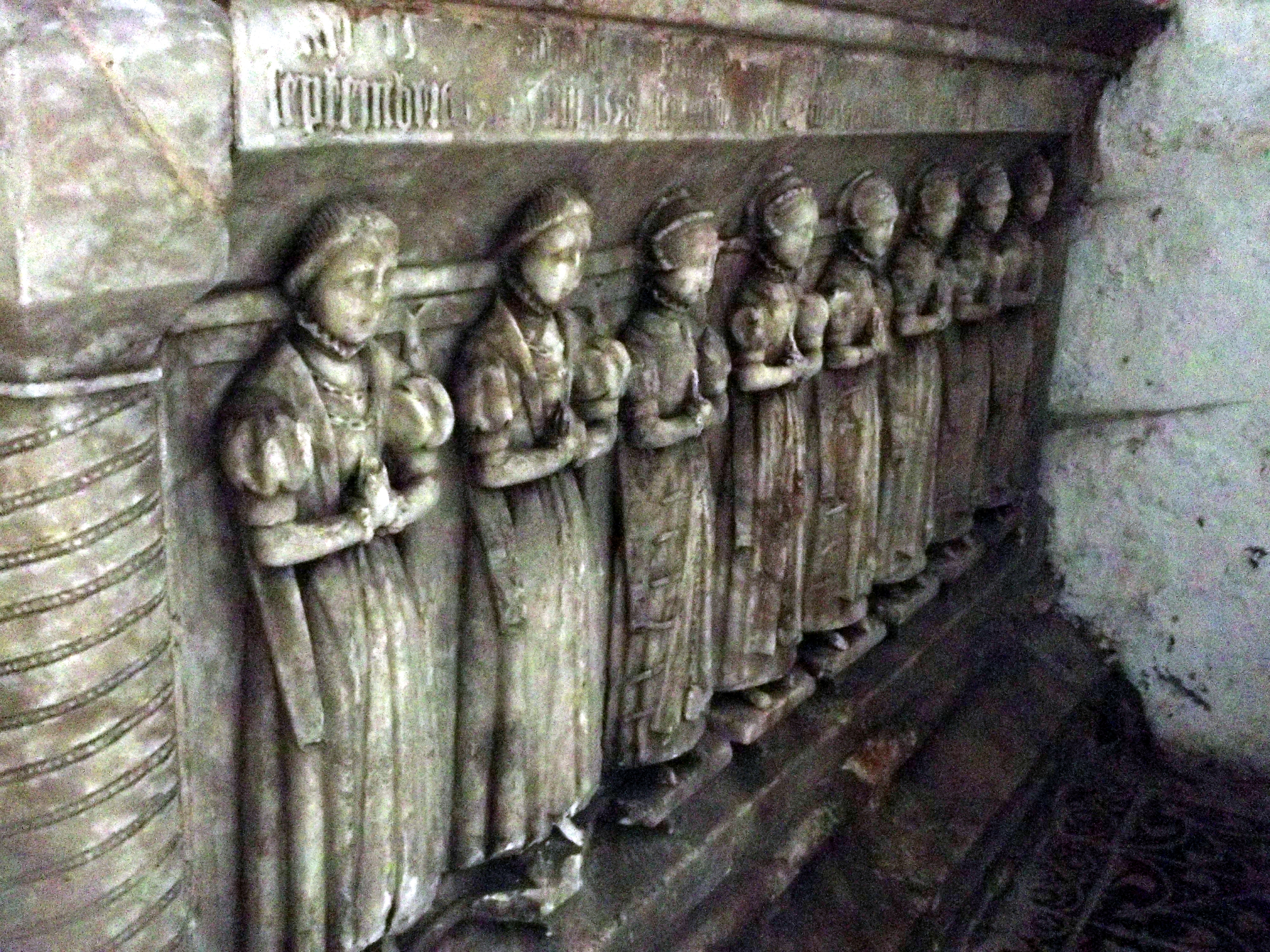
More children of Robert Broke.

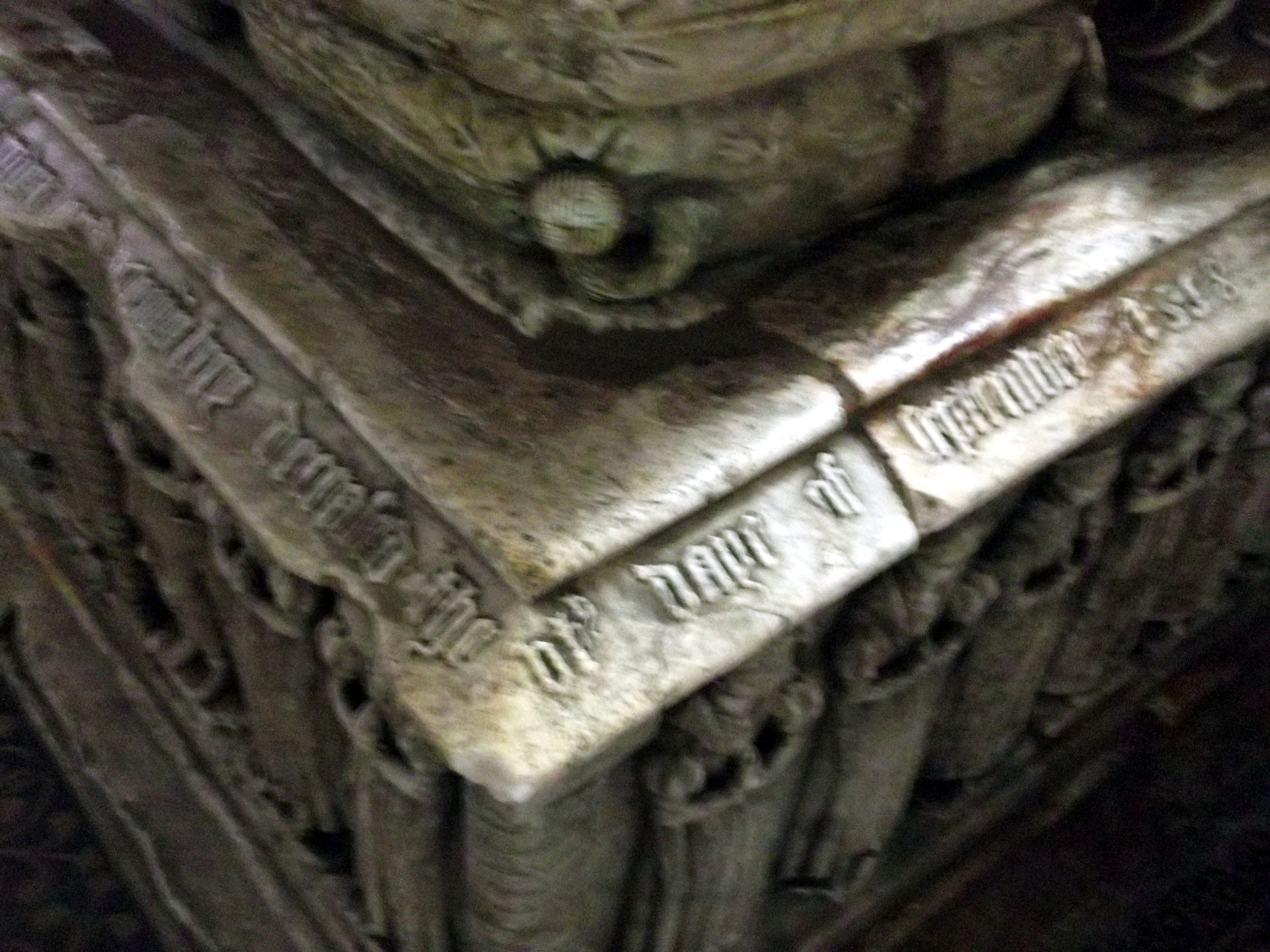
Date of death of Robert Broke, 6 September 1558. His inquisition post mortem gives 5 January.

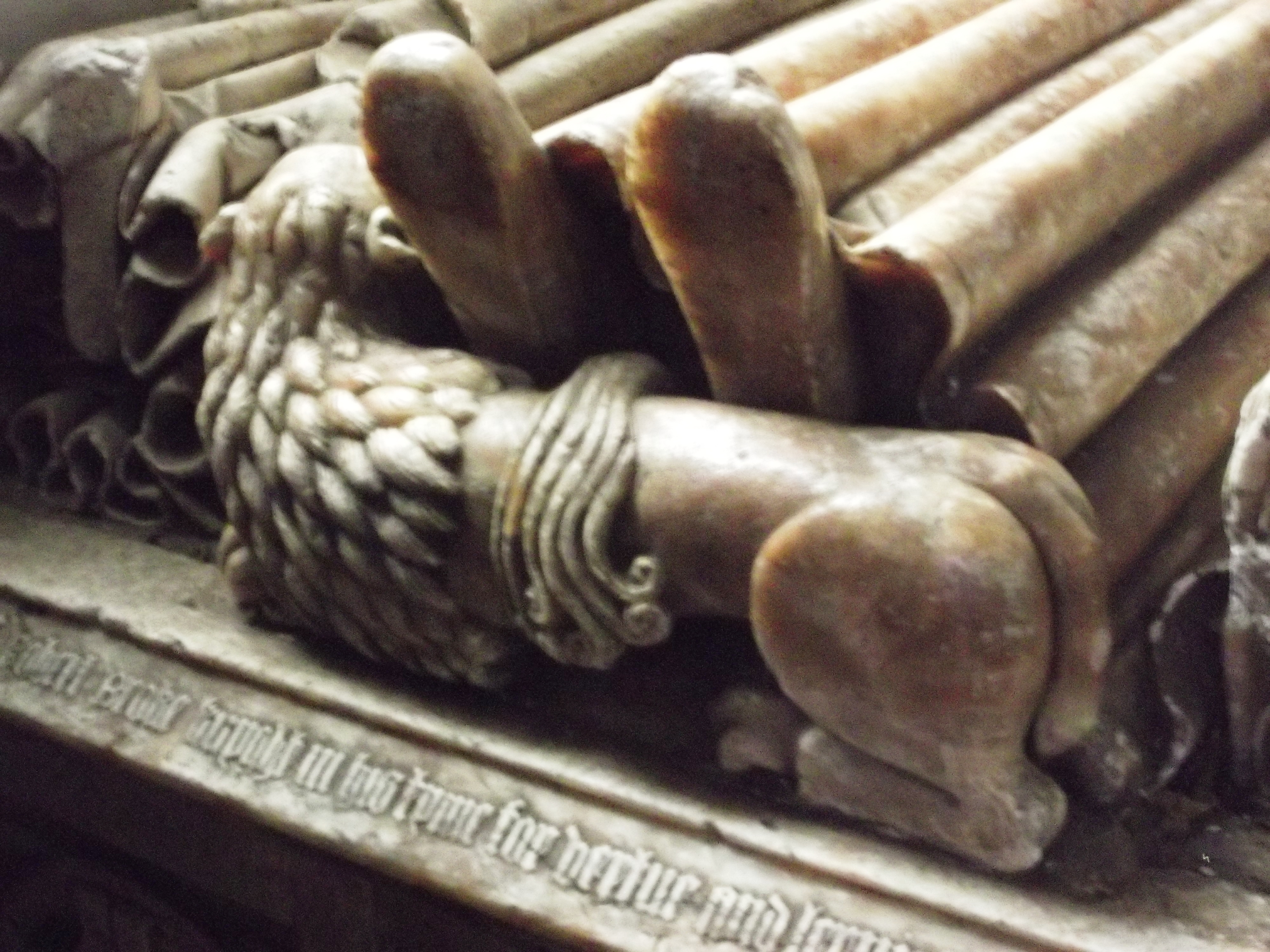
Lion at the feet of Robert Broke effigy.

Broke's will was dated 7 January 1558. The executors of the will included Humphrey Moseley, a young lawyer and MP who was a close friend of Broke. The overseers were William Gatacre, his father-in-law; John and Richard Brooke, his eldest son by each marriage; and Richard Whorwood, his "clerk and cousin". Whorwood very briefly took wardship of John, as he reached his twenty-first birthday in June 1559. The estates were divided between John and Richard, although the widow, Dorothy, had Lapley and retained Madeley until her death. The other sons were given £40 each, with the proviso that they take up study or trade to earn a living "meet for a gentleman's son."

== Family ==
Broke married twice and his will shows that he had seventeen children in all. His wives were:

- Anne Waring, daughter of Nicholas Waring of Shrewsbury, widow of Nicholas Hurleston, former MP for Rochester, who had died in 1531. Broke married Anne by 1537, and she gave birth to his eldest son, John, his main heir, and at least three other children before dying.

- John Brooke inherited Broke's most important estate, Madeley, although he did not obtain it until the death of Dorothy Gatacre, around 1572. He died in 1598.

- Basil Brooke (1576–1646), John's son and Robert's grandson, was a royalist conspirator, a noted wit and raconteur, and an important ironmaster. Partly through economic necessity resulting from his recusancy, he sought to exploit the full industrial potential of the Madeley estate, establishing ironworks and even a steelworks at Coalbrookdale.

- Dorothy Gatacre, daughter of William Gatacre of Gatacre, near Claverley. Broke married Dorothy in 1544. She outlived Broke by about 14 years. They had at least four daughters and five sons, including:

- Richard Brooke, who inherited part of Broke's property as the eldest son of the marriage.

Legal offices
Preceded by Sir Richard Morgan	Chief Justice of the Common Pleas; 1554–1558	Succeeded by Sir Anthony Browne
Political offices
Preceded by Sir John Pollard	Speaker of the House of Commons; 1554	Succeeded by Sir Clement Higham
Parliament of England
Preceded by Sir Roger Cholmley; John Sturgeon; Paul Withypoll; Sir Richard Gresham	Member of Parliament for the City of London with Sir Roger Cholmley 1545–1547; John Sturgeon 1545–1547; Paul Withypoll 1545–1547; Sir Martin Bowes 1547–1553, 1554; Thomas Curteys 1547–1552; Thomas Bacon 1547–1552; John Blundell 1552–1554; John Marshe 1553–1554; Sir Rowland Hill 1553–1554; 1545–1554	Succeeded by Sir Martin Bowes; Ralph Cholmley; Richard Grafton; Richard Burnell
