= Richard Morgan (Tudor judge) =

Member of the Parliament of England

Sir Richard Morgan SL PC (died May 1556) was a Welsh lawyer, judge and politician of the mid-Tudor period. After achieving prominence as a lawyer in the reign of Henry VIII, he became recorder of Gloucester and also Member (MP) of the Parliament of England for Gloucester in the three parliaments of 1545, 1547 and March 1553. He was a notable Catholic supporter of Mary I, who made him Chief Justice of the Common Pleas. However, he was soon removed from office and died in mysterious circumstances, apparently suffering from some form of mental disorder.

== Background and early life ==
Richard Morgan was the son of

- Philip ap Morgan, also known as Philip ap Morgan Watkin, of Llanfair Cilgoed, just west of the village of Cross Ash in Monmouthshire.
- Maud Philpot, daughter of Tomlyn Philpot of Blackbrook, a hamlet to the east of Cross Ash.

Richard Morgan was the second son: his elder brother Dafydd was to predecease his parents without issue. Richard had a younger brother, John Philip Morgan, who was also a Member of Parliament in the reign of Mary I. Their family was of the lowest stratum of the landed gentry and Richard turned to the Law to improve his prospects.

Morgan's lineage led back through the Turberville family, to Sir Payn de Turberville, one of the legendary Twelve Knights of Glamorgan, the Norman conquerors of south-east Wales. In the 13th century, this junior branch of the Turbervilles adopted the standard Welsh patronymic system of naming. Richard Morgan's father maintained this, generally calling himself Philip ap Morgan, while Richard's grandfather was Morgan ab Watkin. Richard broke with this system completely, adopting Morgan as a surname in the English fashion. (John still used his father's name as a second name, and was also known as Jenkin ap Philip.)

The change of names reflected momentous changes that came to Wales in Richard Morgan's lifetime. Hitherto, the feudal lordships established by the Normans still had a reality, especially in Monmouthshire, where the authority of the Council of Wales and the Marches, based at Ludlow in Shropshire, was often ignored. Henry VIII and his ministers tightened up central control in every way, establishing Princess Mary at Ludlow. Under the Laws in Wales Acts 1535–1542, Wales was formally made part of single state with England. It was shired on the English pattern, and Monmouthshire, uniquely, was made part of the English assize system. Boroughs were incorporated and representatives returned to the Westminster parliament. This opened up new paths of promotion and enrichment to ambitious and educated men.

Richard Morgan was admitted to Lincoln's Inn on 31 July 1524. Despite a minor reputation for wildness, he quickly seems to have shown talent as a lawyer. He was called to the bar in 1528.

== Legal and judicial career ==
Arthur Plantagenet, Viscount Lisle, from The Black Book of the Garter, 1534. The Lisle Letters, seized when he was accused of treason, are an important window into the 1530s and include correspondence with Richard Morgan.

Morgan moved into private practice in London. By the late 1530s he was retained by Arthur Plantagenet, 1st Viscount Lisle, the Lord Deputy of Calais. Lisle's subsequent arrest and imprisonment, on suspicion of treason, led to his voluminous correspondence being seized, fortuitously preserving records of his dealings with Morgan. He was successfully dividing his time between private practice, his involvement with Lincoln's Inn and politics in Monmouthshire.

The duties he undertook at his Inn were considerable and onerous. He was auditor in 1534-7, in 1538-9, when he was also butler, and in 1541-2. He was Autumn Reader for the first time in 1542, lecturing on the action of Replevin, unusually using two texts as his source. In 1544-5 he was keeper of the Black Book, which records the proceedings of the governing council. He gave his second reading in 1549 on the Statute of Marlborough.

Meanwhile, Morgan had become sufficiently prominent in his own county to be appointed Custos rotulorum – keeper of the county's records and its senior civil officer. This appointment seems to have occurred around 1543 and lasted to the end of his life.

In June 1546 he was called to the order of Serjeant-at-law by Henry VIII, but was not formally appointed until February 1547 due to the death of Henry. By this point he was Recorder of Gloucester, which he represented in Parliament between 1545 and 1553: the appointment probably dates back to 1544. He was also retained by the Duchy of Lancaster, which had large estates in Monmouthshire.

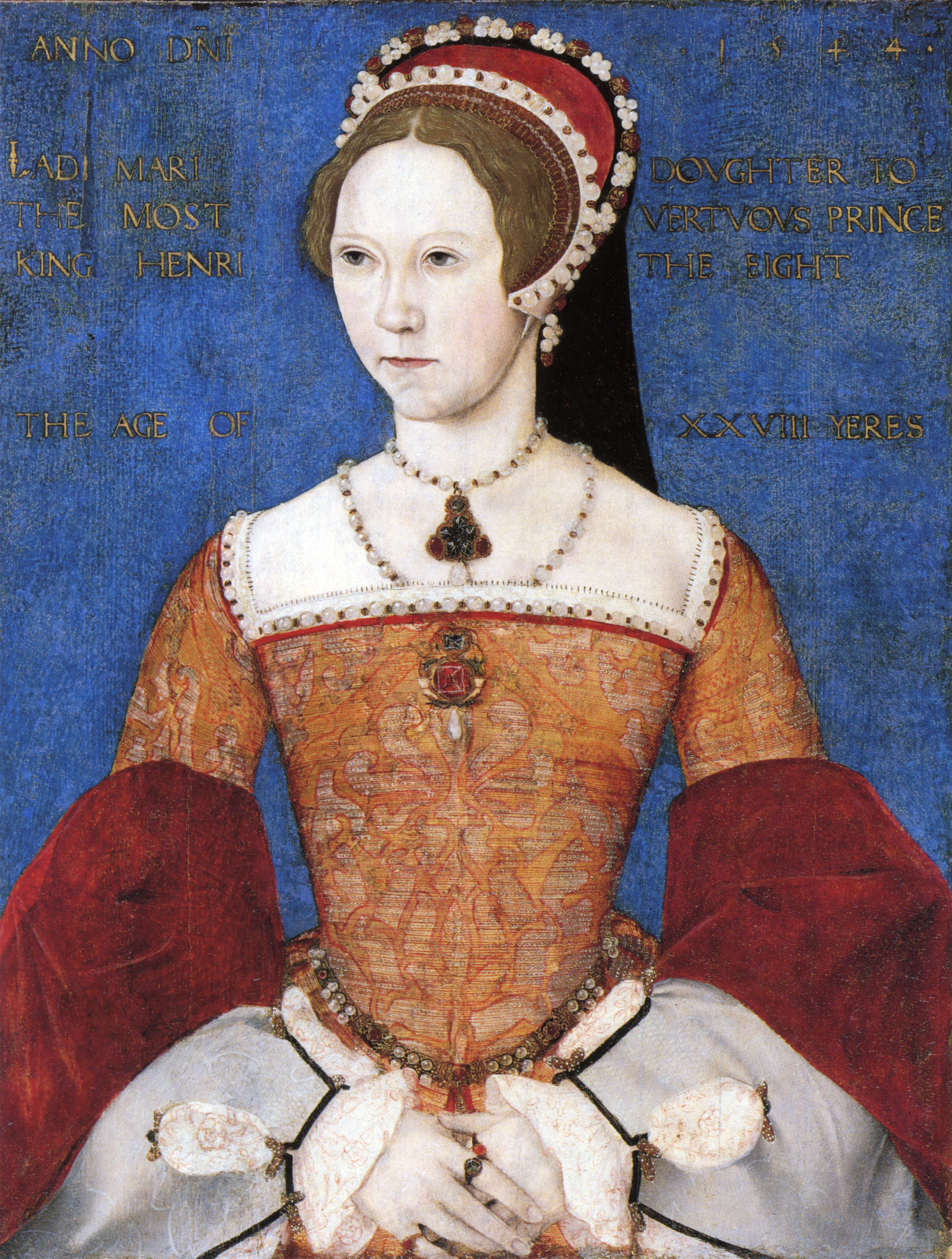
Portrait of Mary, c. 1544, by Master John. Henry VIII's eldest daughter was a focus for religious conservatism throughout her brother Edward's reign. Morgan was briefly imprisoned for hearing mass at her chapel.

However, as a Roman Catholic, Morgan's progress was not so assured under the Protestant regime of Edward VI. He was sent to Fleet Prison on 24 March 1551 for hearing Mass at the chapel of Princess Mary He submitted to the Privy Council and was released on 4 May with a warning. Nevertheless, he was an active parliamentarian throughout Edward's reign and his legal acumen ensured he was entrusted with important investigative work and drafting.

After the death of Edward VI, Morgan joined Mary and her supporters at Kenninghall Castle in Norfolk, in a successful act of resistance to the installation of Lady Jane Grey as queen by the Protestant faction of John Dudley, 1st Duke of Northumberland. He was rewarded for his loyalty by being made a Privy Councillor on 16 August 1553, Chief Justice of the Common Pleas on 23 August and finally by being knighted on 2 October. He took part in the November proceedings against Lady Jane Grey. He became mentally incapacitated at some point in 1555 and was removed from office in October of that year. According to John Foxe and Raphael Holinshed his breakdown was a result of Lady Jane Grey's fate.

== Political career ==
=== Parliament of 1545 ===
Thomas Bell, the immensely rich former mayor who was elected alongside Richard Morgan as MP for Gloucester.

Morgan was elected to the parliament of 1545, the last of Henry VIII's reign, by two constituencies. Gloucester's indenture or electoral return was dated 6 January and placed Morgan first in order of precedence over Thomas Bell, the former mayor.

However, Monmouth Boroughs returned Morgan on 14 January. This was a new constituency, returning only one member, and it had held its first election only in 1542. It included the borough of Monmouth itself, as well as the Monmouthshire "outboroughs" of Abergavenny, Caerleon, Chepstow, Newport and Usk. Thomas Kynnyllyn, who was elected in 1542, was still involved in a protracted legal action to get the outboroughs to pay his wages, as they were legally obliged to do, although it was not clear what say they had had in his election. The Duchy of Lancaster owned the manor and borough of Monmouth and exercised great influence over the election, although the burgesses entitled to vote were numerous. Morgan was certainly known to the duchy and favoured by its officials, although it is not known whether he was already retained by it.

At Gloucester, it was customary to send the recorder to parliament as one of the MPs. It is not certain whether or not Morgan was yet the city's recorder: the first evidence of his appointment dates from as late as January 1547. However, Thomas Lane, the previous recorder died on 2 December 1544 – the day after the parliament was summoned and a month before the elections. Lane had also belonged to Lincoln's Inn may have introduced Morgan to the corporation. So it is possible that he had been appointed, at least informally, before the election, and that he was returned ex officio. Gloucester was the larger and more prestigious constituency, having prospered and become more sophisticated under the leadership of Bell, an immensely wealthy Milliner. Certainly Morgan sat for Gloucester in the two subsequent parliaments. Most authorities assume that he did so in 1545, but this is not certain.

=== Parliament of 1547 ===
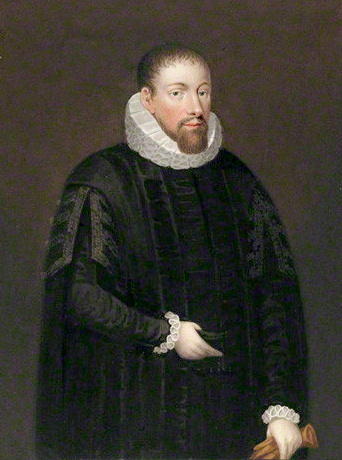
Sir Robert Broke, selected with Morgan for a number of parliamentary inquiries. A fellow-Catholic from Shropshire, Broke's career paralleled Morgan's in many ways.

Morgan was returned to the first parliament of Edward VI's reign, this time second in order of precedence to Bell, who had recently been knighted.

Morgan was increasingly active in this parliament, his legal skills used in reviewing and redrafting proposed legislation. In the second session of the parliament, during 1548-9, he was given responsibility for the bill for fee farms of cities and towns. This was an important part of the monarchy's legislative programme, proposing to release fee farms for three years: Gloucester's had been fixed at £60 in 1489. In the last session, in 1552, he and Robert Broke were given a bill for leases to scrutinise.

However, in this session Morgan seems to have established himself as a useful man in cases touching the status and privileges of Parliament itself. He was also given responsibility for handling an important complaint of Sir Robert Brandling, a member for Newcastle upon Tyne. On their way to parliament, Brandling and his retinue were attacked at Topcliffe in Yorkshire by Sir John Widdrington's men, assisted by Ralph Ellerker. The circumstances turned this from a minor episode in a personal feud into a case of parliamentary privilege. Brandling complained to parliament on 15 February and it became Morgan's responsibility to ensure the culprits were brought before parliament. He drew up the necessary warrants and the initiator of the brawl, Henry Widdrington, was committed to the Tower of London. In the case of William Ward, a Lancaster MP, it was the member himself whose actions required investigation. Ward had taken out an action for breach of privilege on his own account, obtaining a writ from Chancery without consulting the House of Commons. The House passed the matter to a committee of Morgan and three other members: Sir Robert Bowes, Sir Nicholas Hare and Sir John Mason. The outcome is unknown. Finally, he was one of three members deputed to handle the replacement of Thomas Curtys, deceased member for the City of London, whose replacement was John Blundell.

Morgan was one of those deputed to the redraft the Treason Act 1551 to make it illegal to say that the king "is an heretic, schismatic, infidel or usurper of the crown." The notes made by him and other members were submitted to the House on 14 March 1552.

=== Parliament of March 1553 ===
In the final months of Edward VI's reign, Morgan was commissioned by Parliament, along with his fellow Catholic, Robert Broke, to investigate the Maidstone election scandal. The town had been granted a charter of incorporation in 1549. An election was held for the parliament of March 1553 and MPs sent to Westminster. However, the right of the borough to elect representatives was challenged, as there was no explicit recognition of the right to representation in the charter. The issue was complicated by the developing succession crisis, in which John Dudley, 1st Duke of Northumberland, apparently with the king's support, manoeuvred for Lady Jane Grey, his own daughter-in-law, to be nominated Edward's successor. Maidstone was in the Protestant heartland of Kent: Thomas Wyatt was lord of the manor and the returning officer was Sir John Guildford, the High Sheriff of Kent who was a cousin of Dudley's wife One of the MPs elected was a relative of both Dudley and Jane Grey. Faced with possible malpractice by the Protestant court faction, the House ordered Morgan and Broke to "peruse the charter of Maidstone ... whether they may have burgesses in this House; and in the meantime the burgesses there to be absent out of this House till it be fully ordered." The result of the investigation is not known but can be guessed, as Maidstone's right to representation was not established until 1558, after Queen Elizabeth I succeeded her Catholic sister, Mary.

This was Morgan's last parliament. His appointment as chief justice by Mary took him away from his recordership and made him, in any case ineligible for the House of Commons, as he was called by a writ of assistance to serve in the House of Lords in the parliaments of October 1553 and April 1554.

== Religious beliefs ==
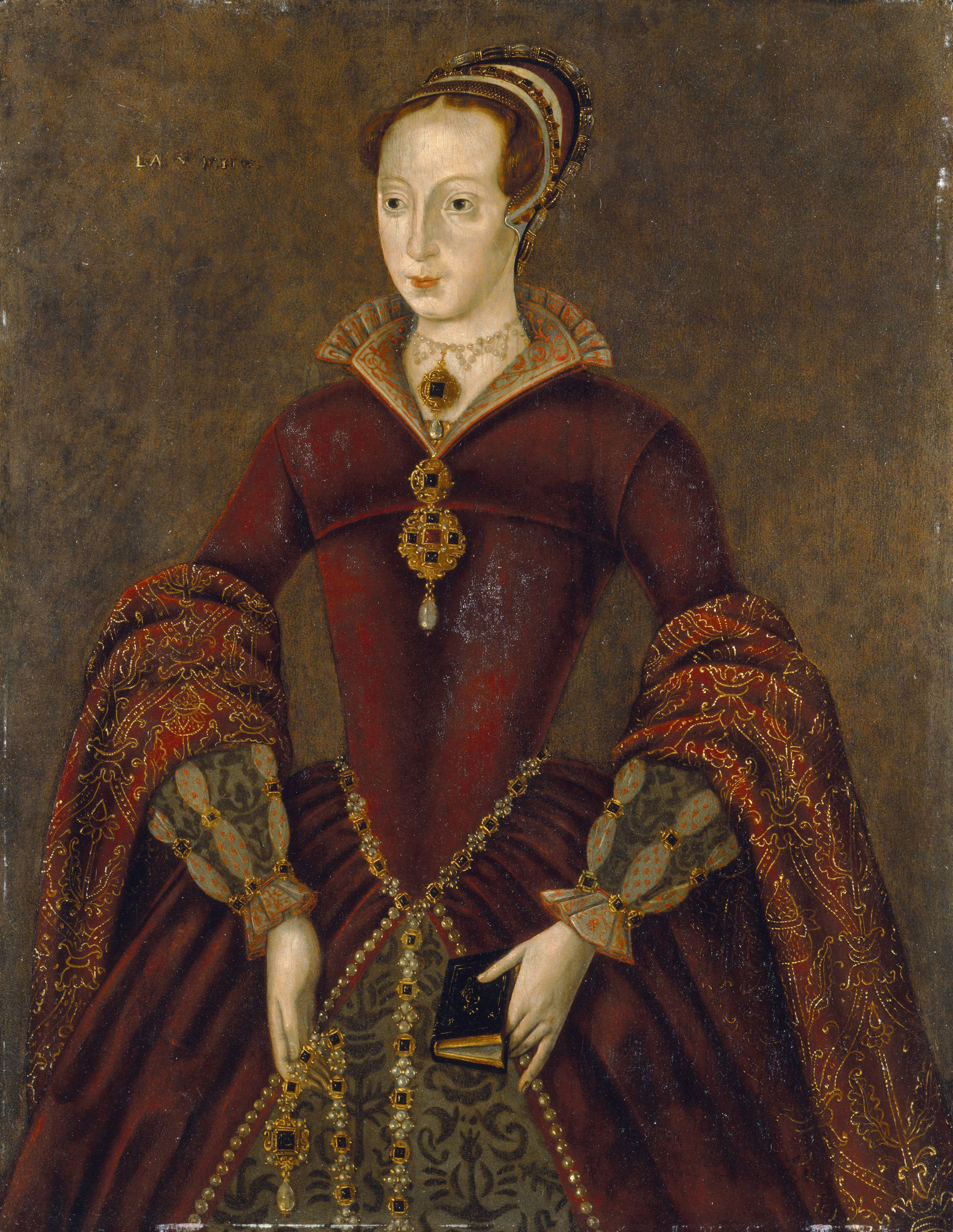
The Streatham portrait, believed to be a 1590s copy of a contemporary painting of Lady Jane Grey. Morgan was part of the special commission that tried her and Protestant propagandists portrayed his later illness as the result of his belated remorse.

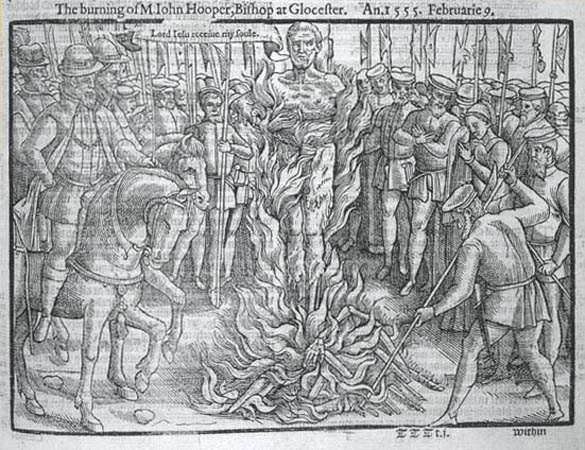
The burning of Bishop Hooper at Gloucester, a woodcut from the 1583 edition of Foxe's Actes and Monuments Morgan attended the burning, having earlier denounced Hooper in the strongest terms.

Morgan's detention in Fleet prison makes clear that he was not merely a religious conservative but a committed Catholic. The group around Mary was a particularly strong redoubt of the Catholic faith and Morgan must have known it would be under constant surveillance. However, he continued to represent Gloucester, increasingly a Protestant stronghold, apparently without difficulty. His professionalism as a lawyer made him useful to any regime and this helps explain the brevity of his incarceration.

His religious commitment was certainly not affected by imprisonment. His first will, dated 18 July 1552, was made three months after the passing of the second Act of Uniformity of Edward VI's reign, which prohibited attendance at services not covered by the Book of Common Prayer. In direct contravention of the Act, he asked for a Catholic burial and for "the sacraments of the true and Catholic Church to be ministered unto me according to the just and true institutions of the same."

His commitment included adherence to every aspect of the Marian Counter-Reformation. He attended in person the burning of John Hooper, the Bishop of Gloucester and Worcester on 9 February 1555, which took place in Gloucester – not an essential responsibility of his office. According to John Foxe, Morgan was particularly vindictive towards Hooper at his deprivation. He must have encountered Hooper many times in the course of his work at Gloucester.

Afterwardes iudge Morgan began to rayle at maister Hooper, a longe tyme, with manye opprobrious and foule woordes, of his doyng at Gloucester, in punishing of men, and sayde: there was neuer suche a tyraunt as he was.

== Death ==
The circumstances surrounding Morgan's death are not entirely clear. The Elizabethan sources were certain that he was punished for his antipathy toward the Protestant faith, in particular his condemnation of Lady Jane Grey. Foxe reports:

Touching the condemnation of this lady Iane, here is to be noted, that the Iudge morgan who gaue the sentence of condemnation against her, shortly after hee had condemned her, fell mad, and in hys rauing cryed out continually to haue the Lady Iane taken away from him, and so ended hys lyfe.

The story was repeated, almost verbatim, in Holinshed's Chronicles and became the accepted explanation of his sudden fall from power and influence. In fact, Morgan was removed from office in October 1555, which was almost two years after the trial of Jane Grey. There is no evidence he ever wavered in his Catholic militancy: his second will, made some time after he became chief justice of the common pleas, still demanded a Catholic burial. Probably Morgan was suspended because of a condition that was believed to affect his judgement or ability to practise as a judge, but the idea that he was driven mad by remorse is likely to be largely invention. It is certain, however, that Morgan and his wife were detained around this time by John Philip, his brother. In November, the Privy Council ordered the younger Morgan to release his brother and sister-in-law, remarking that he had already been ordered to do so previously, although it is not clear whether he ever complied. In his own will, dated 8 August 1557, John Philip makes clear that he and Richard had been involved in property deals together and that Richard's wife was refusing to release to him land that Richard had paid for and he was offering to redeem. This probably has something to do with his detention of the couple. There is little doubt that the brothers had always been on good terms to this point.

Richard Morgan died most likely in late May 1556 and was buried on 2 June at St Magnus-the-Martyr, his local parish church in the City of London. The funeral was recorded by Henry Machyn, a London merchant tailor whose diary gives detailed accounts of funerals because he frequently supplied the cloth and fittings.

The ij day of June was bered at sant Magnus at London bryge ser Recherd Morgayn knyght, a juge and on of the preve consell unto the nobull quen Mare, with a harold of armes bayryng ys cott armur, and with a standard and a penon of armes and elmett, sword, and targatt; and iiij dosen of skochyons, and ij whytt branchys and xij torchys and iiij gret tapurs, and xxiiij pore men in mantyll ffrysse gownes, and mony in blake; and master chansseler of London dyd pryche.

Morgan's last will provided for his younger sons, John and Polydore, to share the lease of Grosmont, which Morgan held from the duchy of Lancaster. Thomas, his heir, was to receive all his other leases of lands in Monmouthshire, including his share of the family home at Ynysgynwraidd/Skenfrith. His wife was given use of the London house, although the reversion was to Polydore. His books were divided among his sons. He ordered a ring of fine gold to be made for Anne, the wife of John Philip Morgan. This reiterated his first will, which said it was for kindness shown him during an illness – possibly an earlier bout of the complaint that finally overwhelmed him.

== Family ==
Morgan married Mary Bailey or Bayly, daughter of Sir Robert Bailey of the Whitecastle lordship, Monmouthshire. She survived Morgan and later married William Brayne of Littledean, Gloucestershire.

At least seven children of Morgan and Mary Bailey are known, with three sons surviving to inherit property from Morgan.

- Thomas Morgan, the heir, who married Mary Pryce of the Priory, Aberhonddu/Brecon
- John Morgan, who married Mary Worrall of English Bicknor, Gloucestershire
- Polydore Morgan
- Gilbert Morgan, who probably predeceased his parents
- Elsbeth "Besse" Morgan, who married one Higgs of London
- Anne Morgan, who married Thomas Quayne of Norfolk
- Mary Morgan

Legal offices
Preceded by Sir Edward Montagu	Chief Justice of the Common Pleas; 1553–1554	Succeeded by Sir Robert Broke
Parliament of England
Preceded by Not known	Member of Parliament for Gloucester; 1545–1553	Succeeded by Thomas Loveday
