= John Jenour =

British legal official

John Jenour (1465 – 17 September 1542) was an English legal official. He was the son of William Jenour of Stonham Aspal, Suffolk and his wife Katherine Whiting, and the elder brother of Robert Jenour, who became an officer of the Court of Common Pleas along with John. In 1491 he worked as an attorney for the Common Pleas, and in 1503 he became Filazer of Devon, Dorset, and Somerset, followed by a 1510 promotion to Second Prothonotary. As Prothonotary he was in charge of pleading and entries, and his book of entries was sometimes cited in court; a copy currently belongs to the Library of Congress. Although he never rose higher than Second Prothonotary, his influence on the next generation of judges was profound; he trained Sir Robert Catlyn, Sir Robert Broke, Sir Anthony Browne and James Dyer, all of whom became Chief Justices. He died on 17 September 1542, leaving two sons; Richard, the elder, later became a Member of Parliament and clerk of the Court of General Surveyors, while Robert, the younger, also became a barrister, although not one of any major note.
