= Anthony Browne (judge) =

English politician and justice

Sir Anthony Browne QS (1509–1567), sometimes referred to as Antony Browne, was an English justice.

== Life ==
He came from a family of lawyers. His father, Sir Wistan Browne, of Abbess Roding, Essex, was a barrister of the Middle Temple, and three of his uncles served as benchers there, one of whom was Sir Humphrey Browne, a justice of the Court of Common Pleas. On his mother, Elizabeth's side were Sir John Mordaunt, chancellor of the Duchy of Cornwall, and William Mordaunt, chief Prothonotary of the Common Pleas. Keeping with family tradition he joined Middle Temple, and became a pupil of John Jenour, at the time the second Prothonotary of the Common Pleas.

In 1545, he became a Member of Parliament, and in 1554 a bencher of Middle Temple. He was made a Serjeant-at-law in 1555 under the patronage of the Earl of Oxford, and was then immediately made Queen's Serjeant, obliged as the junior serjeant of his inn to give a reading, which he did on the subject of the Statute of Jeofails.

== Execution of William Hunter ==
In 1555 Browne was responsible for the execution of William Hunter one of the Marian martyrs.

On 5 October 1558, Browne was appointed Chief Justice of the Common Pleas by Mary I; his appointment was reconfirmed in November by her successor, Elizabeth I. He was removed by Elizabeth in the following January by means of appointing him a Puisne Justice of the Queen's Bench, most likely due to his religious disagreements with the new queen; while it was not serious enough to demand removal from the court, it would be unthinkable to have the head of a major court in religious disagreement with the monarch.

In 1563, it was rumoured he would replace Nicholas Bacon as Lord Keeper of the Great Seal; if so he rejected it on grounds of religion. In 1565, he wrote an essay supporting the claim to the throne of Mary Stuart, which was later included in John Lesley's A Treatise concerning the Defence of the Honour of Marie, Queene of Scotland, made by Morgan Philippes, Bachelar of Divinitie, Piae afflicts animi consoleiones, ad Mariam Scot. Reg. in 1571, and also encouraged Edmund Plowden to write A Treatise on Succession, which attempted to prove that Mary was not debarred from the English throne under Henry VIII's will.

It is likely Elizabeth was aware of these anti-Protestant efforts as she knighted him in February 1567. Browne remained a justice of the Common Pleas until his death on 16 May 1567 at Weald Hall in Essex.

Plowden described him at his death as a judge 'de profound ingeny et graund eloquence' (of profound ingenuity and grand eloquence), and the Spanish ambassador called his death a great loss to the Catholic faction in England. His funeral was performed, per his request, with the traditional Catholic ceremonies, and at his funeral various friends were given gold mourning rings in the style of those of Serjeants-at-Law with 'Wee dye' engraved on the outside and 'Forgett nott' on the inside.

He was buried in St Peter's Church in South Weald, but his tomb was badly damaged in the 1868 church restoration, leaving only a headless figure in judicial robes and part of an inscription, which gives his age at death as fifty seven.

== Family ==
Browne married Jane, the daughter of William Farrington at an undetermined point, but, as the marriage was childless, most of his estate was left to his brother George and various friends. His most lasting creation is Brentwood School, created as 'The Grammar School of Anthony Browne, Serjeant at the Law, in Brentwood'.

== Parliament ==
Browne was a Member (MP) of the Parliament of England for Lostwithiel 1545, Great Bedwyn 1547, Preston March 1553 and October 1553, Scarborough April 1554 and Maldon November 1554.

Legal offices
Preceded by Sir Robert Broke	Chief Justice of the Common Pleas; 1558–1559	Succeeded by Sir James Dyer
