= John Sturgeon =

16th-century English politician

John Sturgeon (by 1498 – 1570/71), of London, was an English politician.

== Family ==
Sturgeon was married to Joan by 1522. They had at least three sons and two daughters.

== Career ==
He was a Member (MP) of the Parliament of England for London in 1542 and 1545 and Hindon in 1547.

He was Chamberlain of London from 1550 to 1563.

He was buried at St Benet Gracechurch, in the Bridge ward.
