= Fee farm grant =

In Irish and Northern Irish law, a fee farm grant is a hybrid type of land ownership typical in cities and towns. The word fee is derived from fief or fiefdom, meaning a feudal landholding, and a fee farm grant is similar to a fee simple in the sense that it gives the grantee the right to hold a freehold estate, the only difference being the payment of an annual rent ("farm" being an archaic word for rent) and covenants, thus putting the parties in a landlord-tenant relationship.

== Types ==
Fee farm grants fall into three categories:

- Feudal fee farm grants

The ban on subinfeudation in the fee simple did not apply to land granted after Quia Emptores to supporters of the Crown. These new estates (many of which were created after the 17th-century plantations) were thus regularly divided into subtenures as fee farm grants.

- Conversion fee farm grants

Any perpetually renewable leases for life were converted into fee farm grants after the enactment of the Renewable Leasehold Conversion Act 1849. This act also allowed any existing lessees for lives to convert their holding into a fee farm grant.

- Express fee farm grants

The Landlord and Tenant Law Amendment (Ireland) Act 1860 (i.e. Deasy's Act) allowed for the creation of express fee farm grants.

== Reform ==
In Ireland, the Land and Conveyancing Law Reform Act 2009 (Section 12) does not allow the creation of any new fee farm grants, and where any such attempt is made a fee simple is automatically created instead. The act did not alter the status of any existing fee farm grants. Likewise in Northern Ireland, article 28 of the Property (Northern Ireland) Order 1997 prohibits the creation of new fee farm grants since 10 January 2000 without prejudice to existing fee farm grants made before that date.

== Etymology ==
- Fee – A right in law to the use of land; i.e. a fief.
- Farm – a fixed yearly amount of rent or other payment (from the Medieval Latin ferma, firma).
- Grant – transfer of property by deed of conveyance.

== See also ==
- Allodial title
- Demesne
- Fee tail
- Fee simple
- Ground rent
- Leasehold
- Life estate
- Quia Emptores
