= Ustonson =

Ustonson is a British surname. Notable people with the surname include:

- Onesimus Ustonson (1736–after 1783), British manufacturer of fishing tackle
- Maria Ustonson (fl. 1822–1833), British manufacturer of fishing tackle, daughter-in-law of Onesimus
