= Onesimus Ustonson =

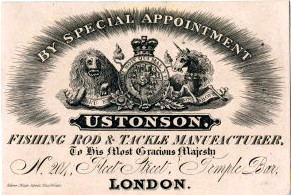
An Ustonson label

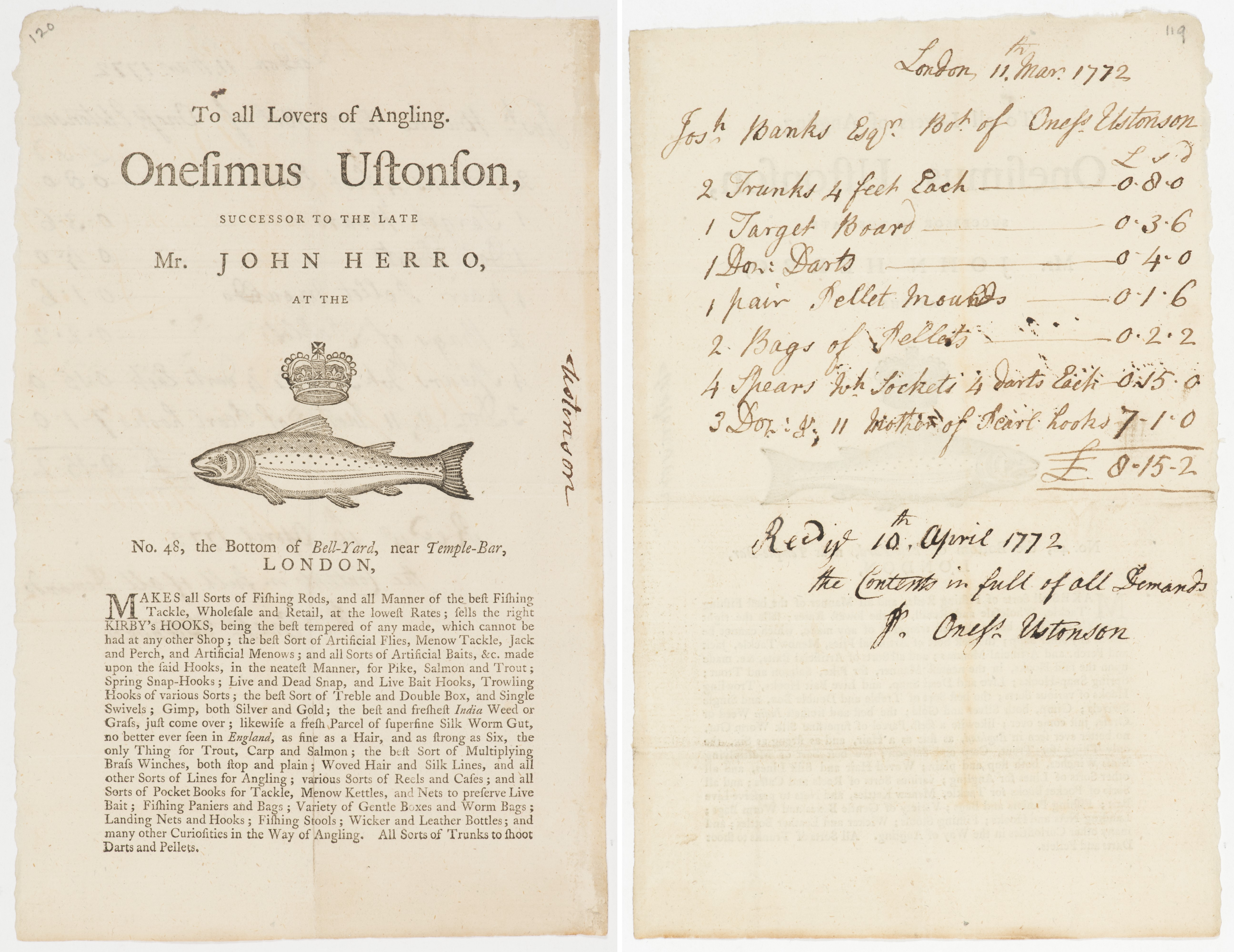
Ustonson invoice and receipt to Joseph Banks, 1772.

Onesimus Ustonson (April 1736 – after 1783) was an English manufacturer of fishing tackle. He invented the multiplying reel, and supplied fishing tackle to the naturalist Joseph Banks for the second voyage of James Cook, 1772–1775. The firm of Ustonson went on to become Royal Warrant holders to three successive British monarchs.

== Early life ==
Onesimus Ustonson was born in April 1736 in Aldenham, Hertfordshire, the son of Thomas Ustonson, a tailor, of St Giles in the Fields, London.

== Career ==
In 1749, Ustonson was apprenticed for seven years to John Herro, a fishing tackle maker and owner of the Fish and Crown at 48 Bell Yard, Temple Bar, a narrow street between Carey Street and Fleet Street. He took over the business in 1760 and opened his shop in 1761. The firm remained a market leader for the next century.

In 1770, Ustonson invented the first multiplying reel, and supplied fishing tackle to the naturalist Joseph Banks for the second voyage of James Cook, 1772–1775. In 1783, he was made master of the Worshipful Company of Turners, one of the oldest Livery Companies in the City of London. His son John was master in 1818.

== Death and legacy ==
Ustonson died after 1783. His third son, Charles Ustonson (born 1775), took over the business in 1815, but died in 1822, and his widow Maria Ustonson (née Pearce) took over. In 1830, she married the portrait painter William Armfield Hobday, and after his death in 1831, married Robert Joy in 1833.

The firm of Ustonson received a Royal Warrant from three successive monarchs, King George IV, William IV, and Queen Victoria.

Early Ustonson fishing reels are sought after collectables, and a brass and ivory example sold at auction for £6,000 in 2007. A receipt handwritten by Onesimus himself for Lord Delaval, who spent six guineas in 1789, sold at auction in 1999 for £2,800, and an 1815 reel for £7,000.
