= Tong, Shropshire =

Village in Shropshire, England

Coordinates: 52.663°N 2.303°W

Tong
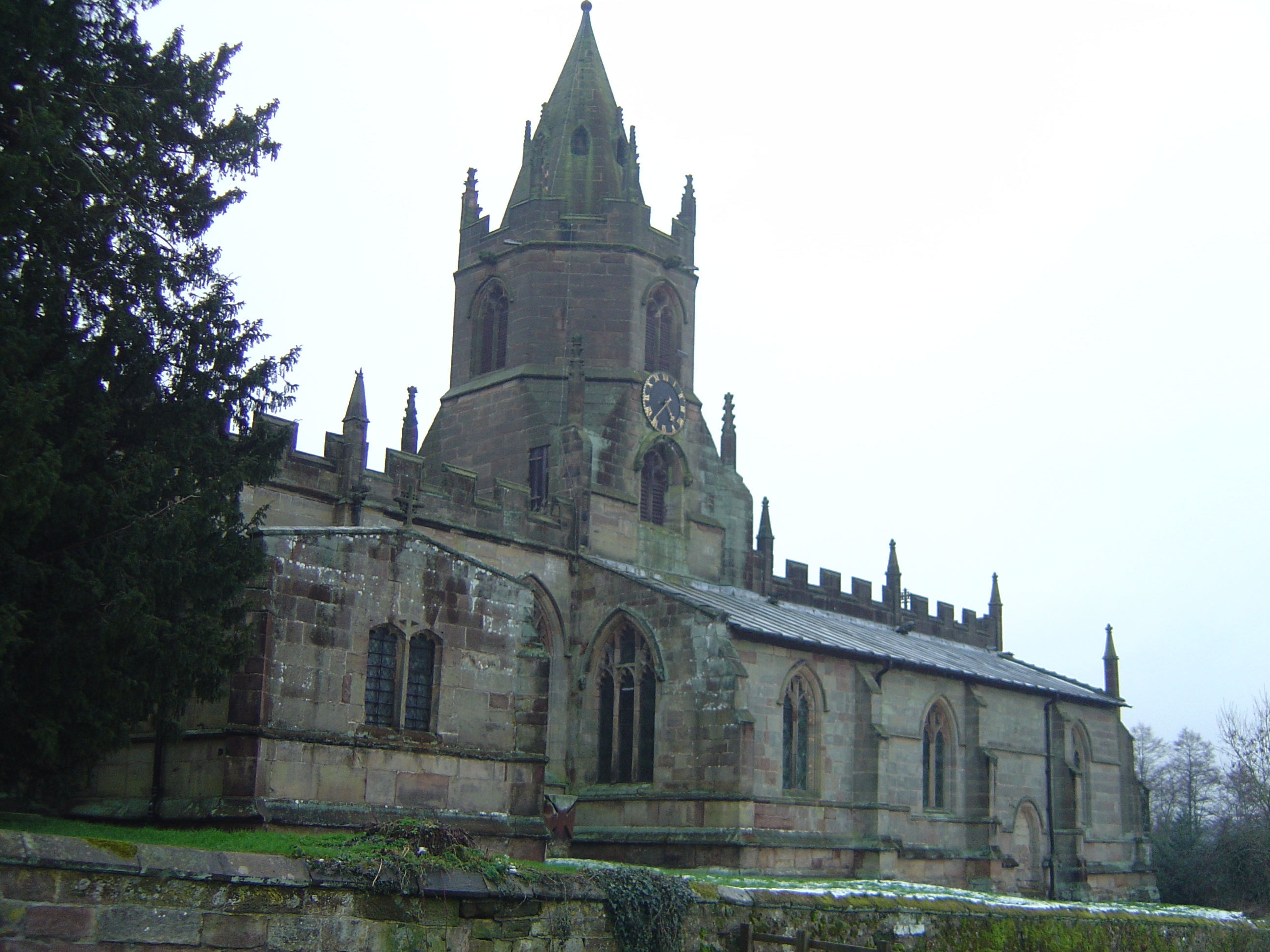
- St Bartholomew's church, 10 February 2007

- Location within Shropshire
- Population: 243 (2011)
- OS grid reference: SJ795073
- Civil parish: Tong
- Unitary authority: Shropshire
- Ceremonial county: Shropshire
- Region: West Midlands
- Country: England
- Sovereign state: United Kingdom
- Post town: SHIFNAL
- Postcode district: TF11
- Dialling code: 01952
- Police: West Mercia
- Fire: Shropshire
- Ambulance: West Midlands
- UK Parliament: The Wrekin

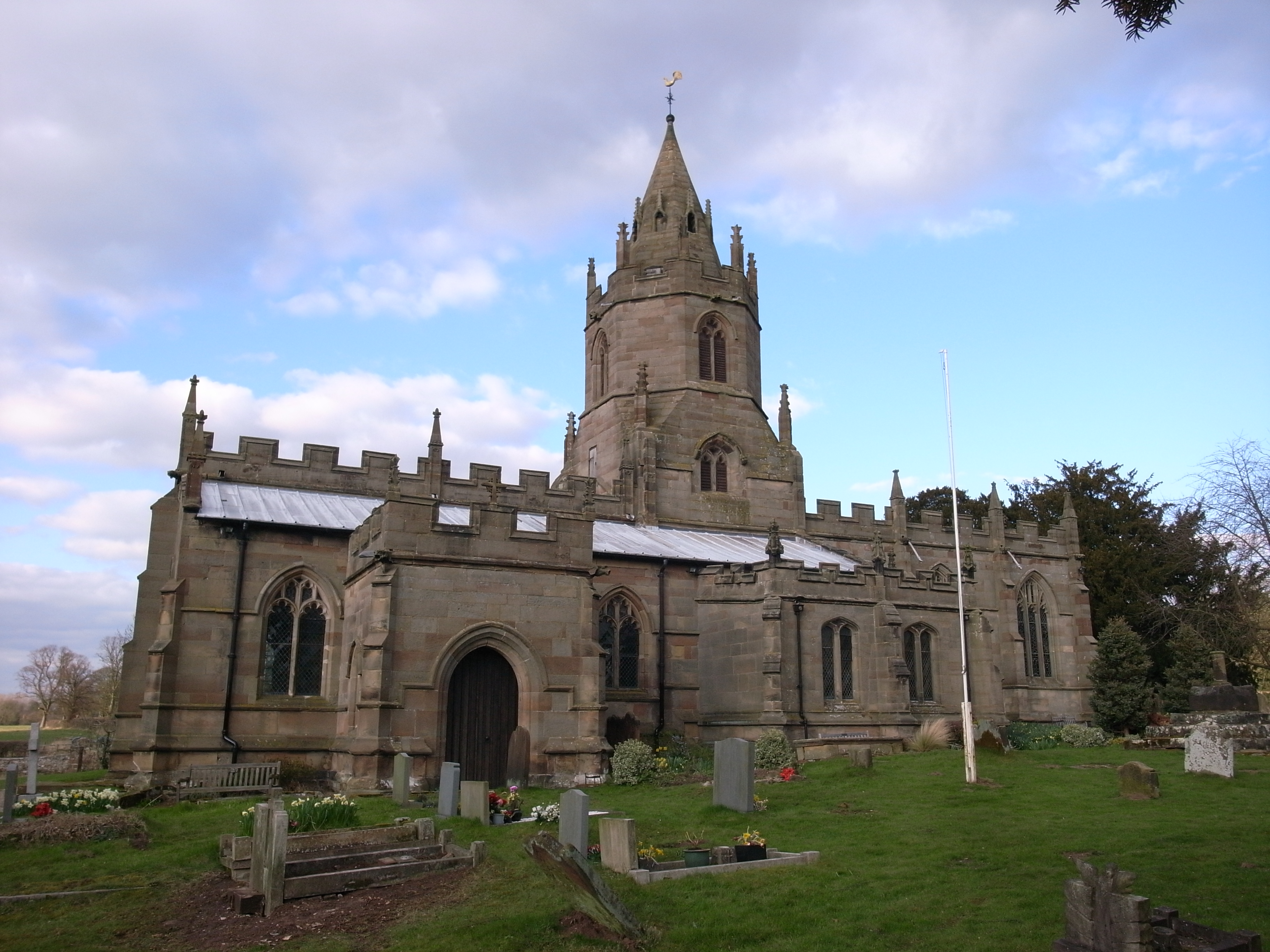
Looking north

Tong is a village and civil parish in Shropshire, also bordering Staffordshire in England. It is located between the towns of Shifnal, Newport and Brewood. It is near junction 3 of the M54 motorway and A41 road. The population of the village which was included in the civil parish at the 2011 census was 243. The village is also near to Weston Park and the village of Weston-under-Lizard.

== Etymology ==
The name of the village derives from the Old English Tweonga, which means a pinched piece or spit of land; cf. tongs. This stems from the fact that Tong sits between two tributaries of the infant River Worfe.

== History ==
In the 1840s, Tong was surveyed by two different railway companies. The Shrewsbury and Wolverhampton Railway was eventually driven further south to run through Ruckley and Neachley (just south of the M54), whilst the Shrewsbury and Leicester Direct Railway, which would have gone in a north-east to south-west direction between Tong and Tong Norton, was never built.

The village lies just to the north of the M54 in Shropshire. The A41 road used to run through the village, but after heavy traffic and the death of a child under a lorry, the village was bypassed in 1963.

=== Escape of Charles II ===
In "White-ladies," one of the "Boscobel Tracts" that describe the events of the escape of Charles II from England after the Battle of Worcester (3 September 1651), there is a statement that Charles, while sheltering at Boscobel House about two miles away, "had the pleasure of a prospect from Tong to Breewood (sic), which satisfied the eyes, and of the famous bells at Tong, which entertained the ear." The bells he heard were the bells of St. Bartholomew's. During the escape Charles also spent the night of 4/5 September 1651 at Hobbal Grange in the parish of Tong as a guest of Richard Penderel.

== Church ==
The village is remarkable mainly for its church, St Bartholomews, in the churchyard of which is the supposed grave of Little Nell, a fictional character in Charles Dickens's book, The Old Curiosity Shop. It is thought that Dickens visited Tong church. His grandmother is supposed to have worked at Tong Castle many years before as a girl. The Castle (demolished in 1954) stood to the south; its site is now occupied by the M54 motorway.

The 'grave' is thought to have come about because Charles Dickens's novel was serialised and shipped over to America, and as a result, Americans began coming over to England to visit scenes featured in the book. The tourists recognised the references to Tong church from the book and came to view the supposed 'grave', which of course was not there.

However, a verger and village postmaster, George H. Boden (16 August 1856 - May 1943) apparently asked local people to pay for a headstone, forged an entry, in fictitious name of "Nell Gwyn", in the church register of burials (apparently the giveaway was that he used Post Office ink to do this), and charged people to see the 'grave'. The marker has been moved from time to time to make way for genuine graves.

A particularly notable feature of St. Bartholomew's is the collection of memorials to the Vernon family and other proprietors of the Tong estate inside the church. St. Bartholomew's was chosen by Simon Jenkins of The Times in 1999 as one of the best 1,000 churches (out of 15,000) in England. He awarded the church, which was mostly rebuilt in 1409, three stars out of a possible five. He refers to the collection of village tombs, the masterpiece of which being that of Richard Vernon, who died in 1451. Most of the earlier ones are carved from alabaster, and are the products of the top end of the nearby late medieval Nottingham alabaster industry.

== Gallery ==
Funerary art in St Batholomew's church, Tong

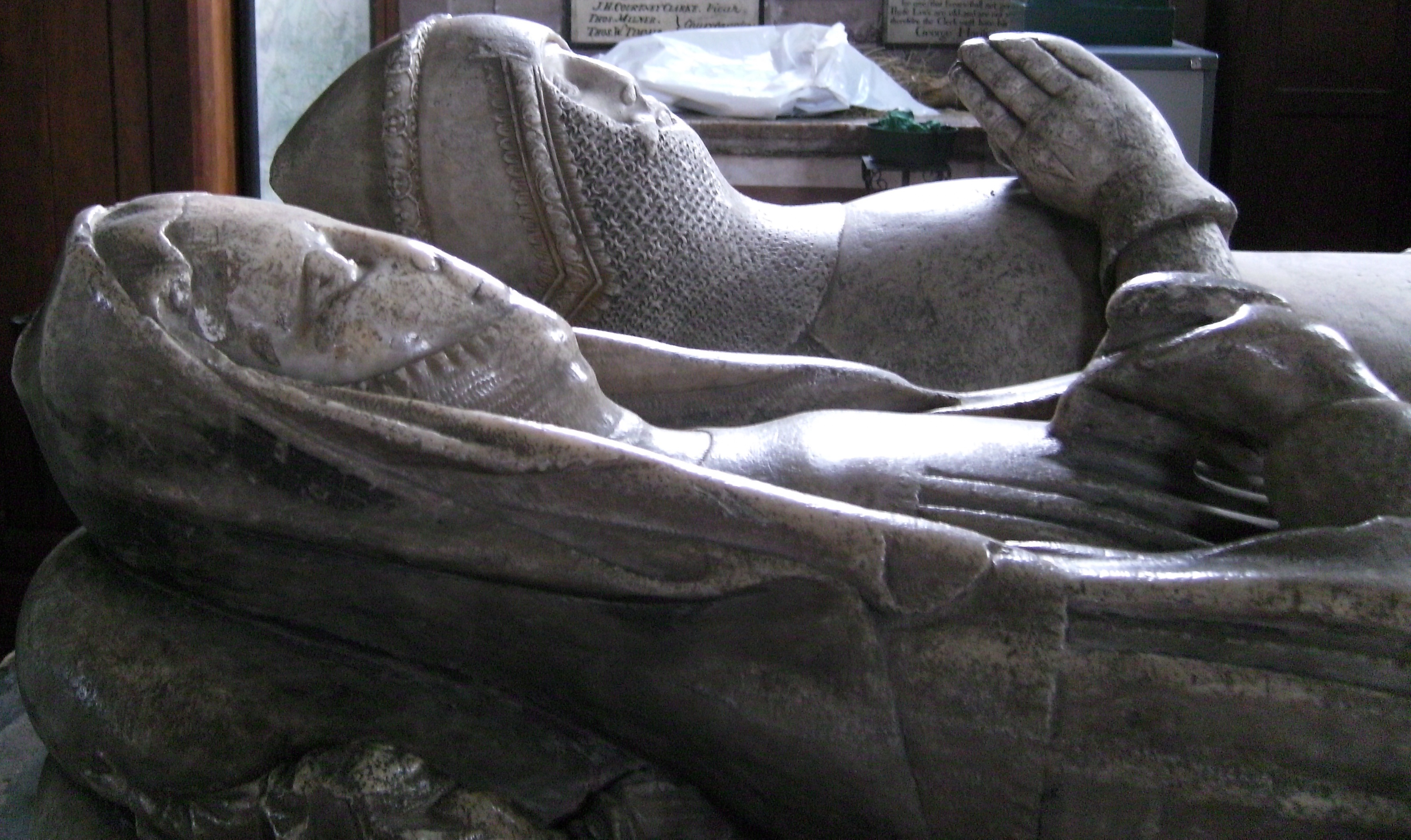
Isabel de Lingen (died 1446) and her third husband, Fulke de Pembrugge (died 1409). Isabel founded the chantry and college at Tong for her own and her husbands' souls. It became the shrine church of the Vernon family of Haddon Hall.

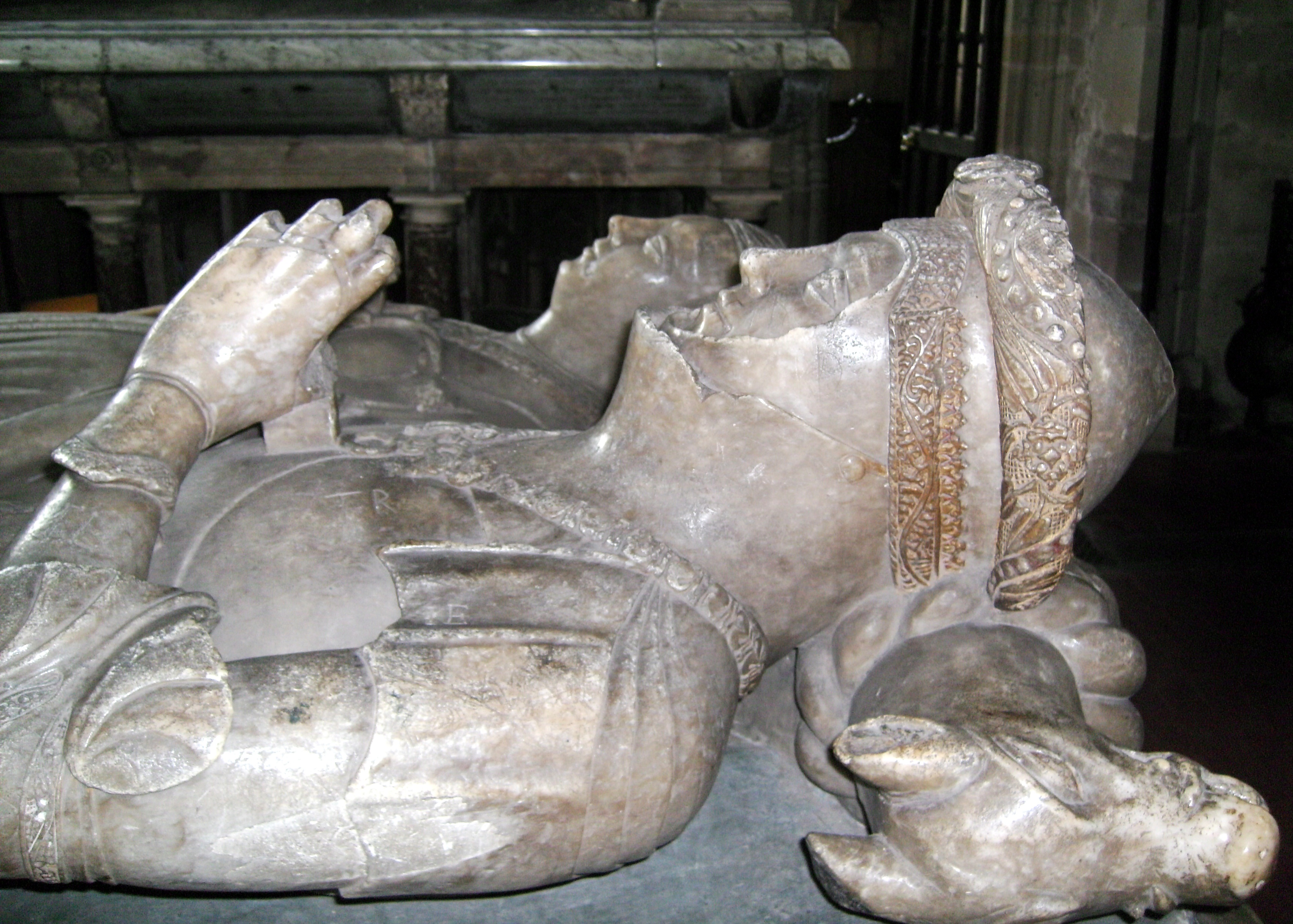
Richard Vernon (died 1451, foreground) and Benedicta de Ludlow. Through their marriage the Vernons of Haddon Hall obtained Tong. Tomb in St Bartholomew's Church, Tong, Shropshire. Richard was Speaker of the House of Commons in 1432 and 1433.

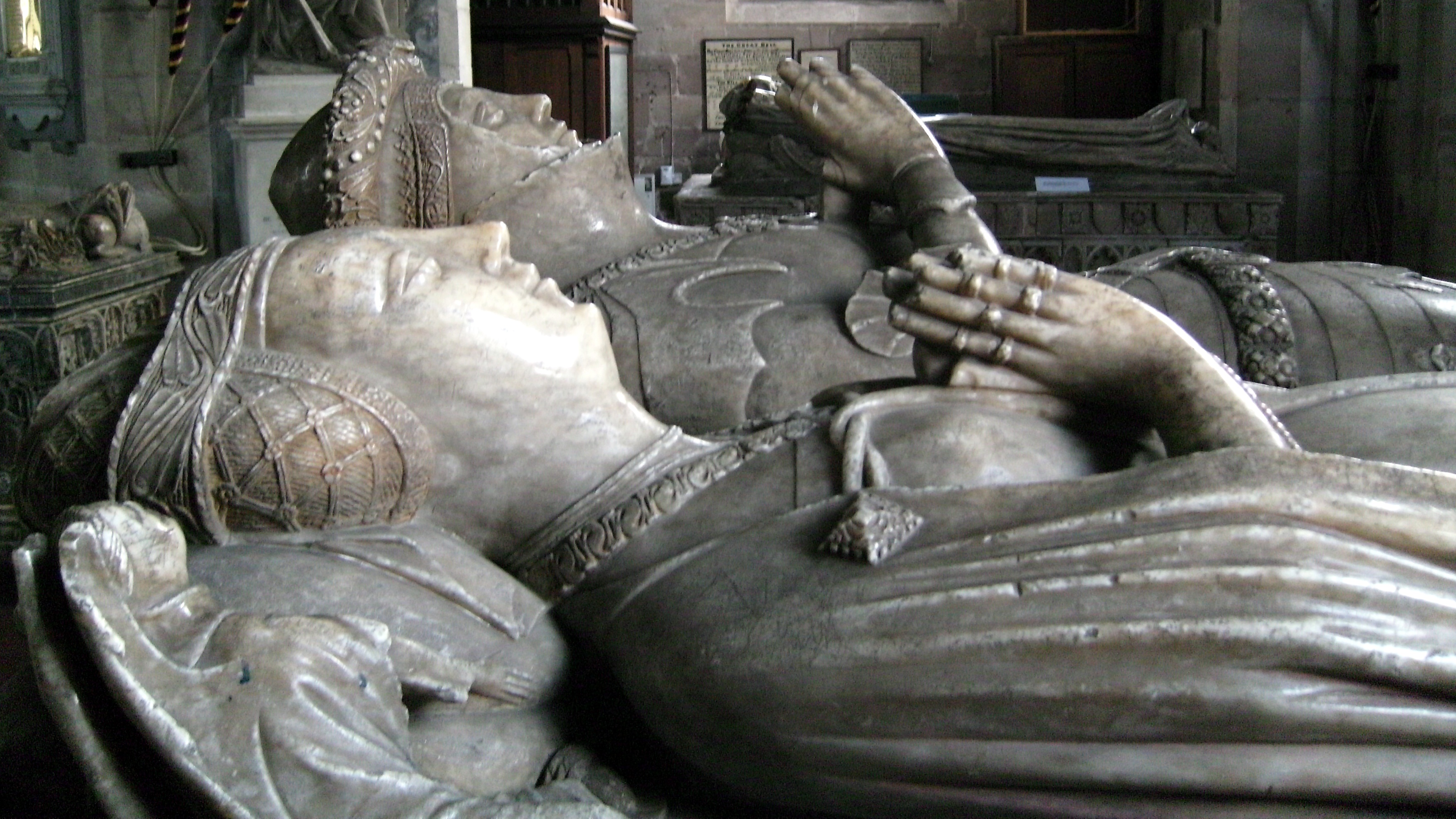
Benedicta de Ludlow (foreground) and Richard Vernon (died 1451). This tomb has the most impressive sculpture at Tong.

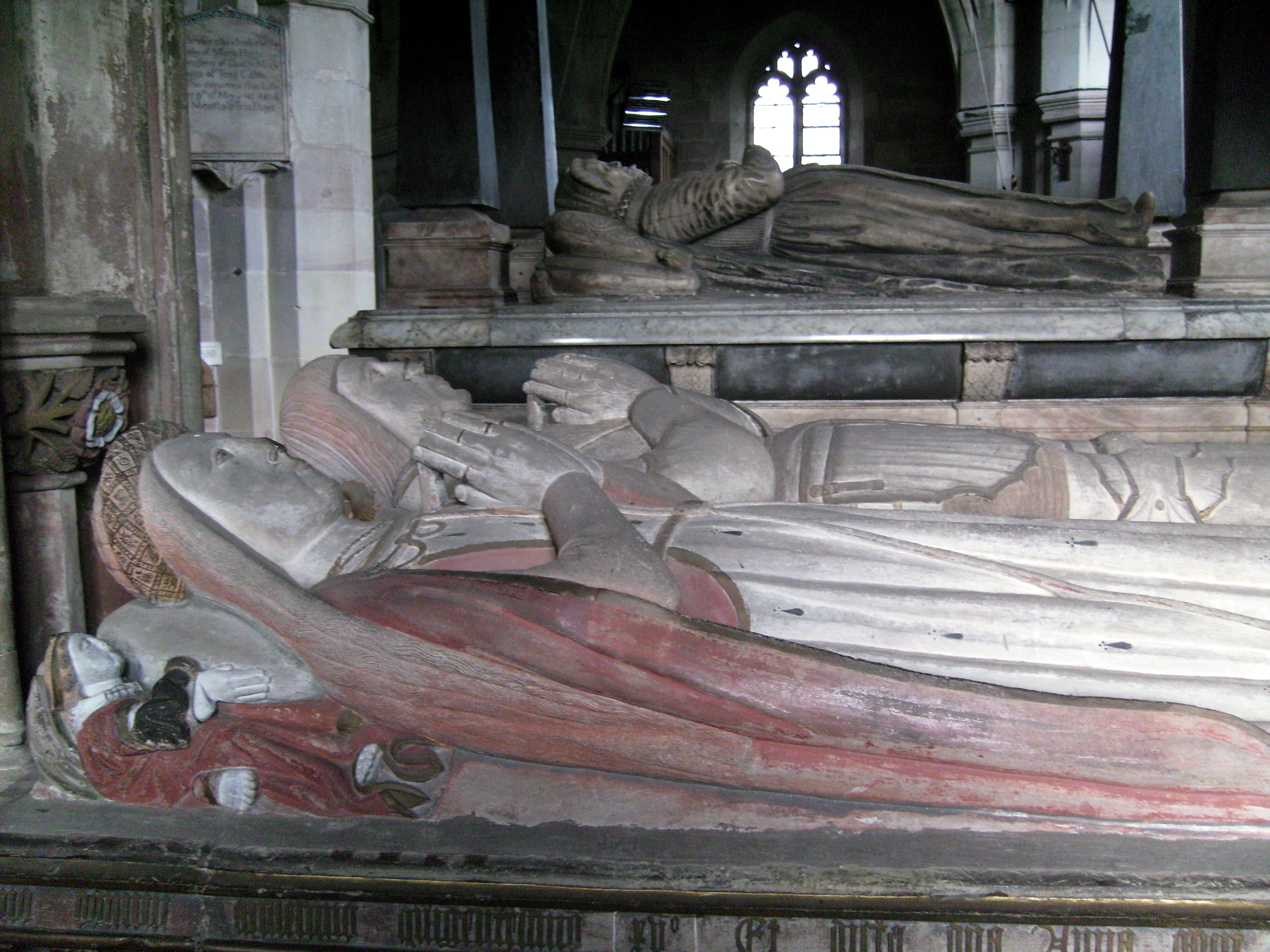
Tomb of Anne Talbot (died 1494) and Henry Vernon (died 1515). Henry was put in charge of Catherine of Aragon and Arthur, Prince of Wales by Henry VII and was with them when Arthur died at Ludlow in 1502.

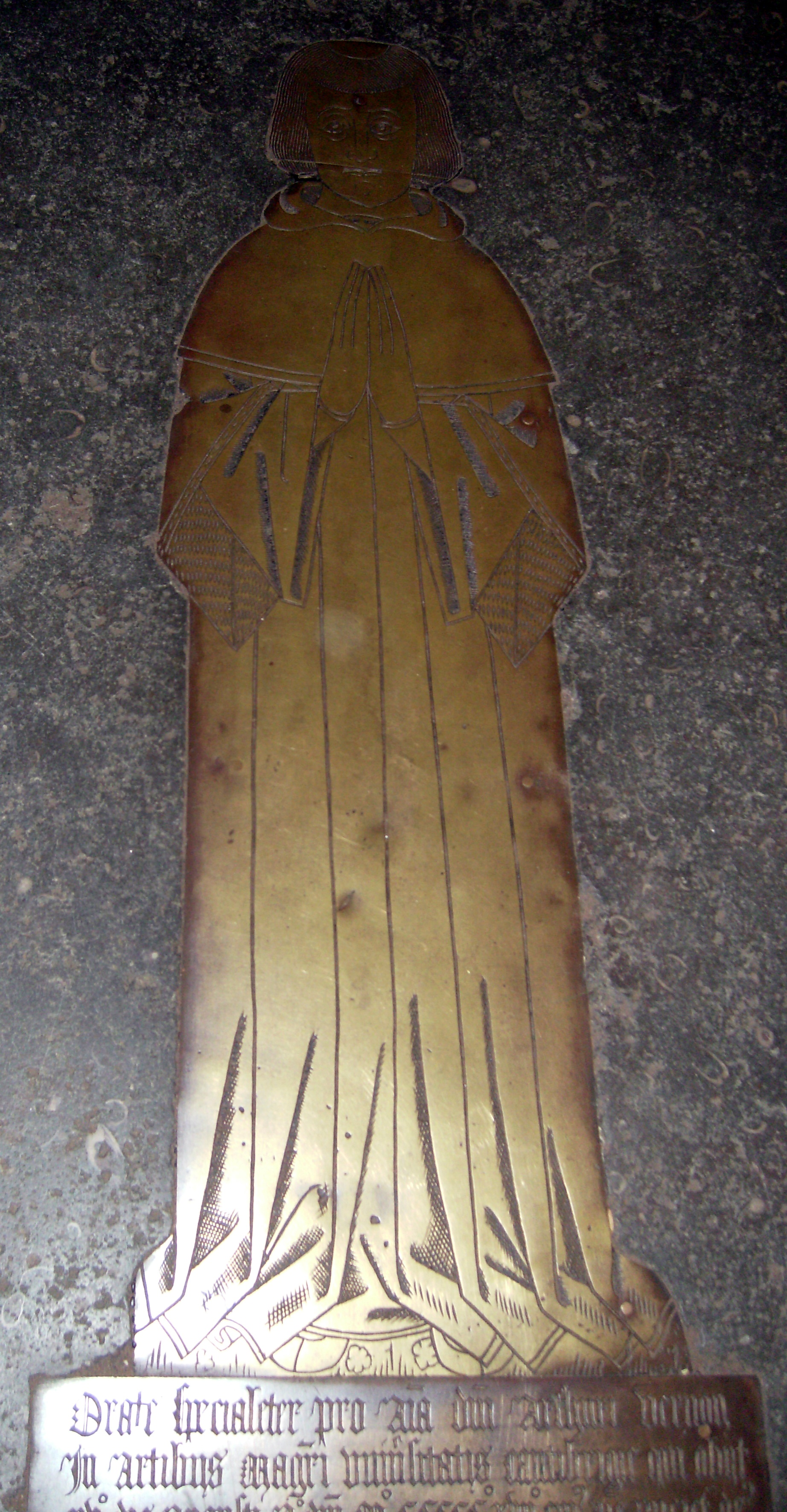
Arthur Vernon, priest and son of Anne Talbot and Henry Vernon, in the robes of a University of Cambridge MA, on his tomb in the floor of the Golden Chapel at Tong.

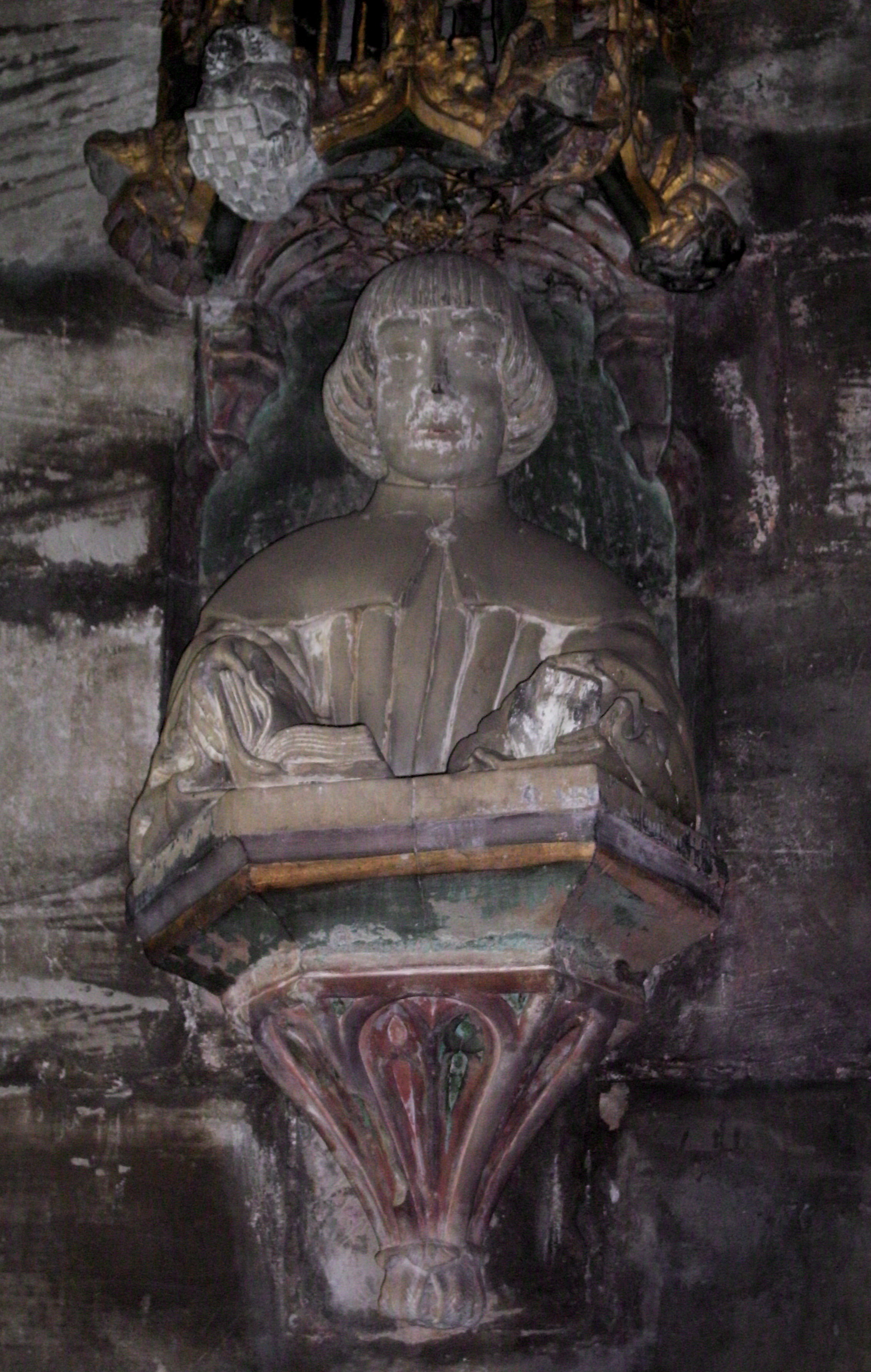
Arthur Vernon portrayed preaching in the Golden Chapel at Tong.

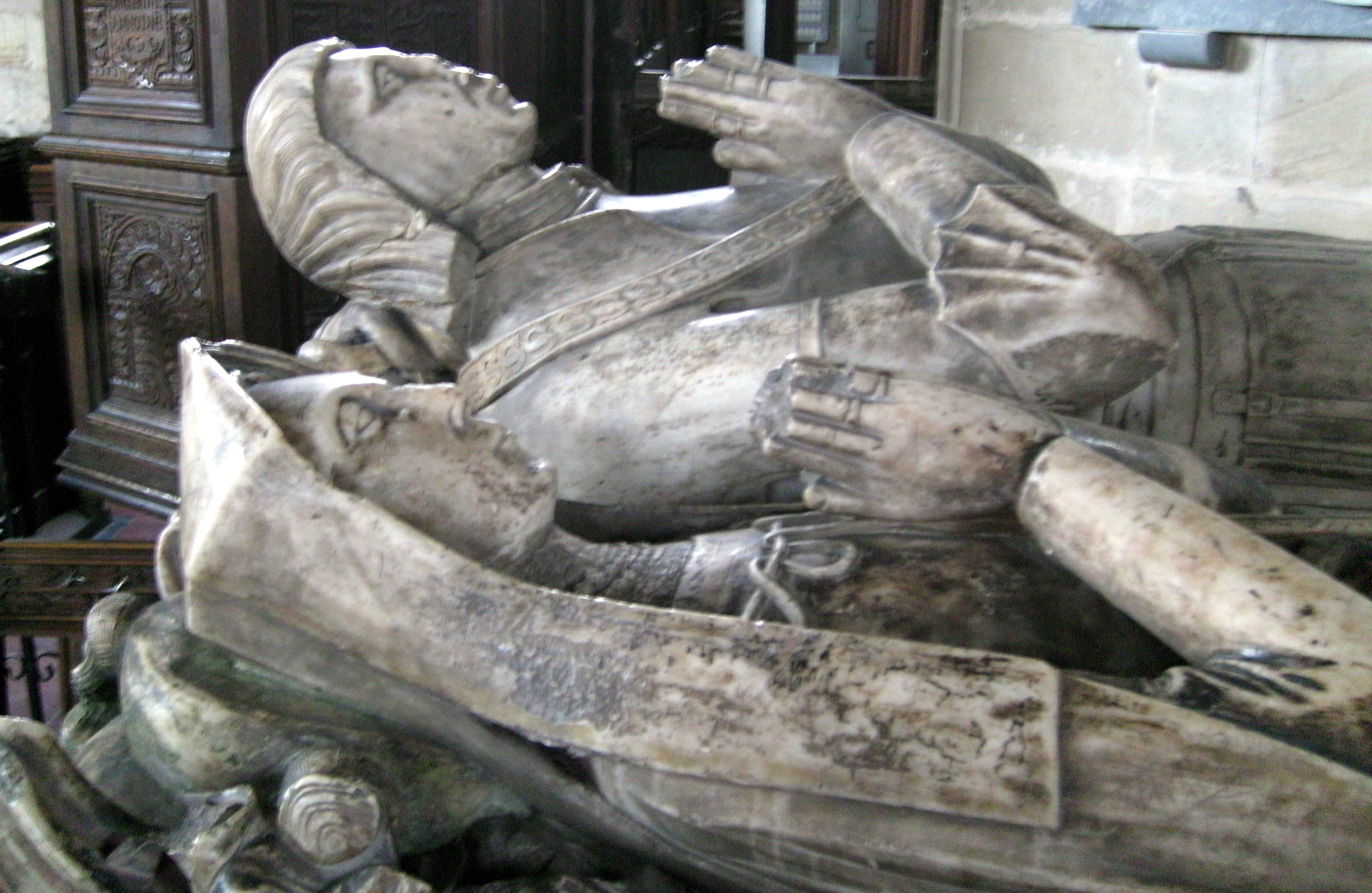
Margaret Dymmok and Richard Vernon (died 1517). After his death, Margaret married Sir Richard Manners.

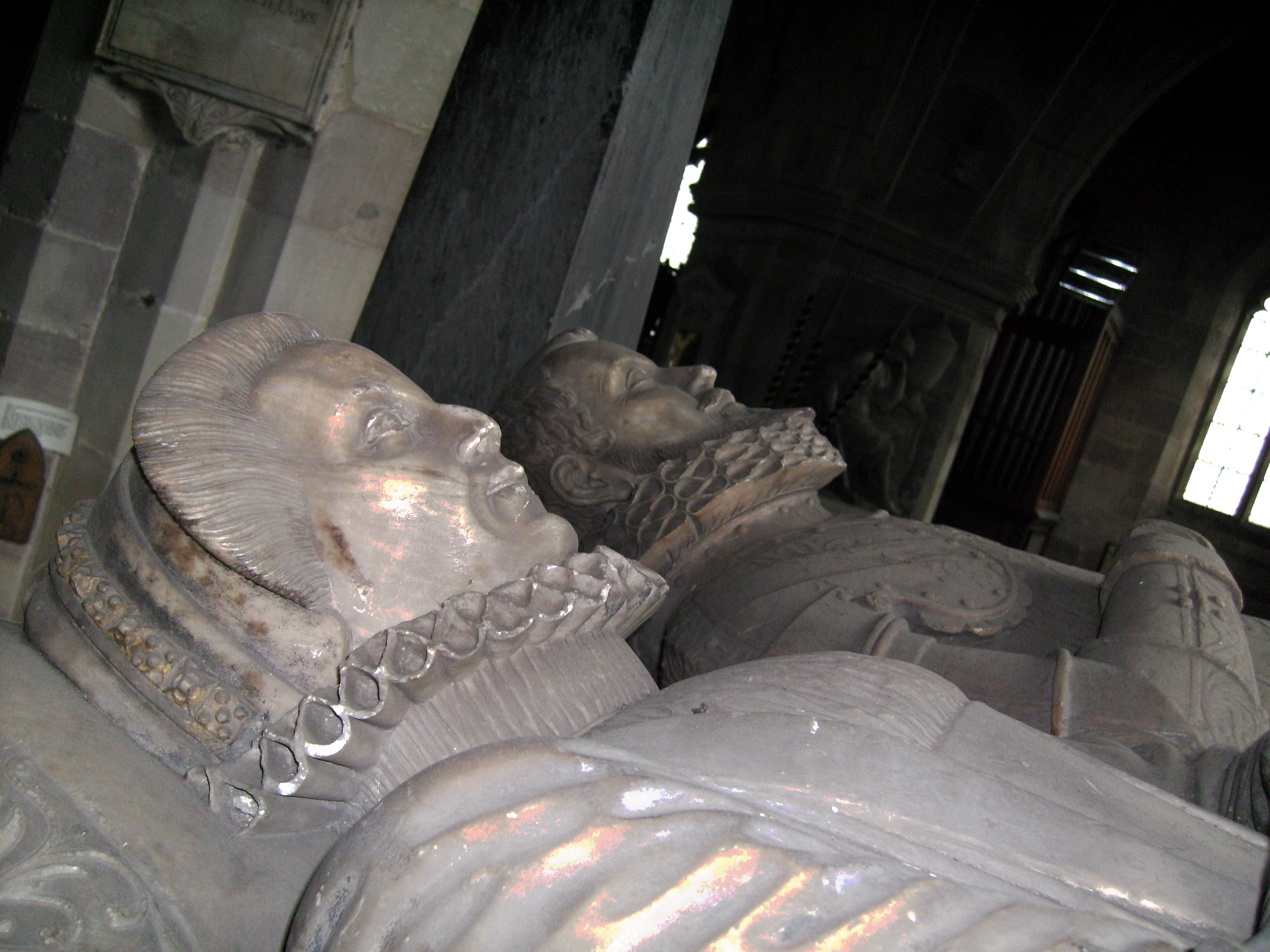
Margaret Vernon and Thomas Stanley (died 1576). George Vernon, son of Richard and Margaret, died without male heir. He left his estates to his daughters: Haddon to Dorothy and Tong to Margaret, who married Stanley, the second son of Edward Stanley, 3rd Earl of Derby. Part of a double family tomb.

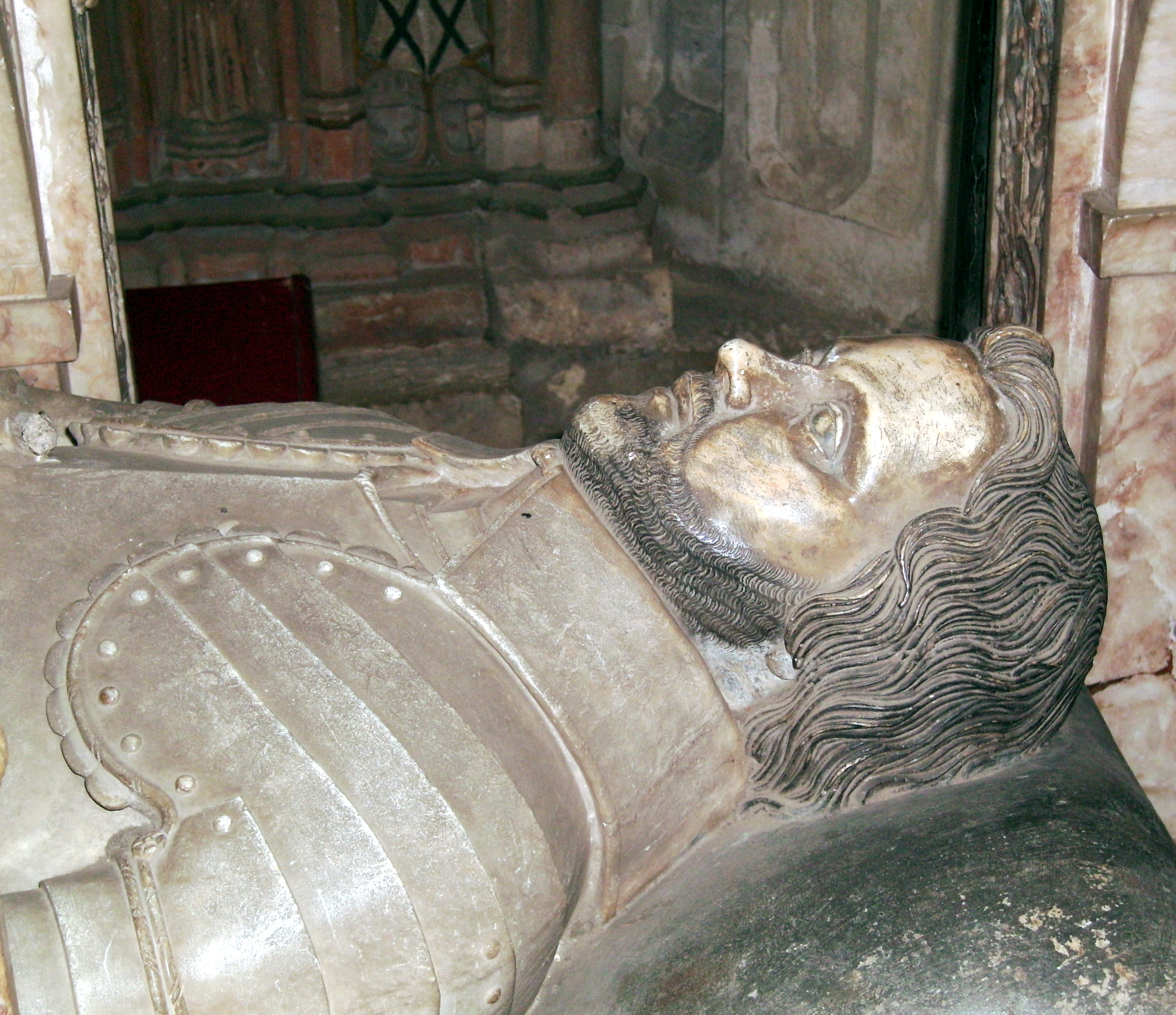
Edward Stanley (died 1632), last of the Vernon heirs to own Tong, which he sold to Thomas Harries about 1630. He was the father of Venetia Stanley, a famous courtesan of the early 17th century. Lower tier of a double family tomb.

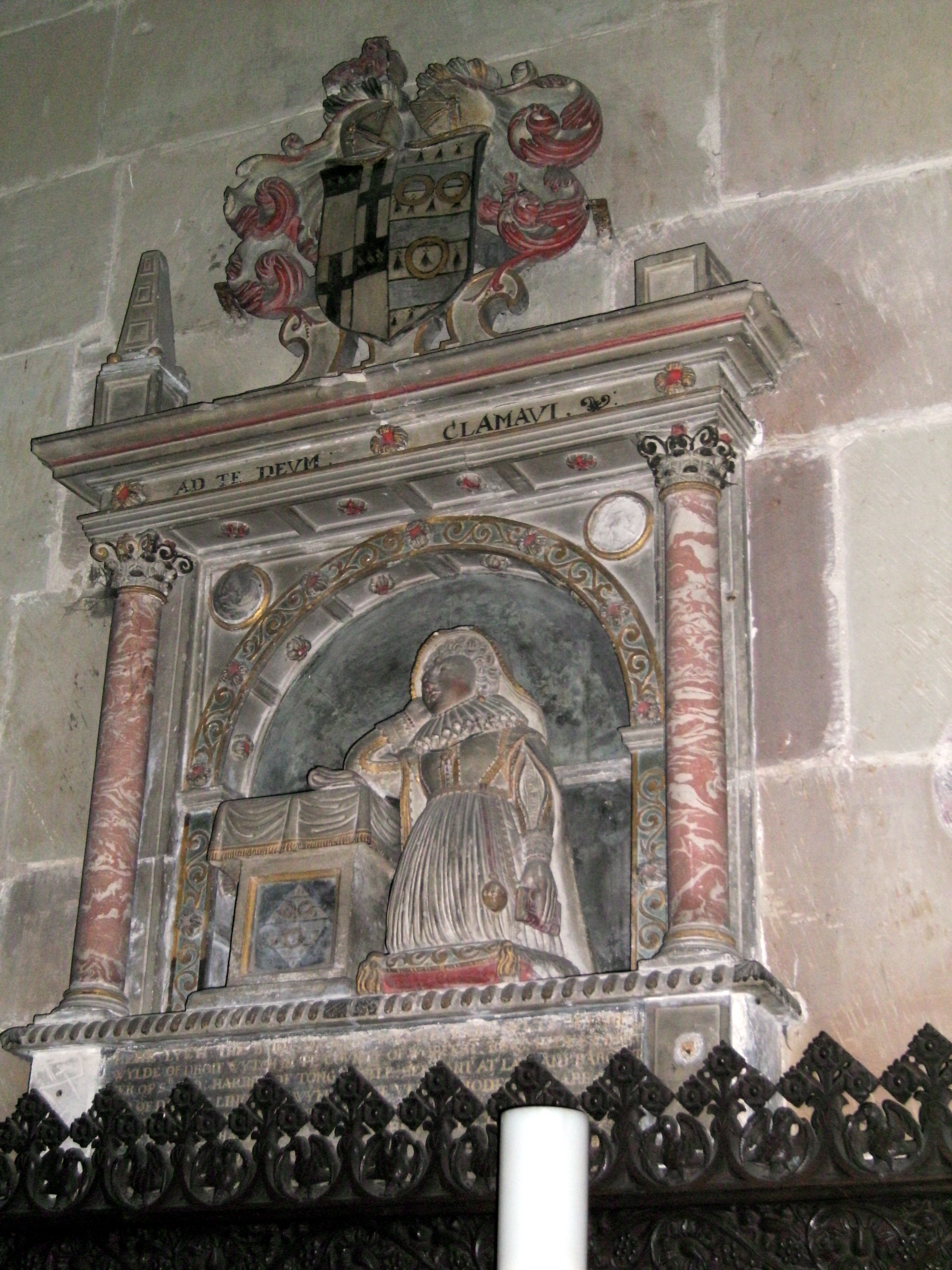
Memorial to Ann Wylde, daughter of Thomas Harries of Tong, who died in childbirth, aged 16, in 1624.

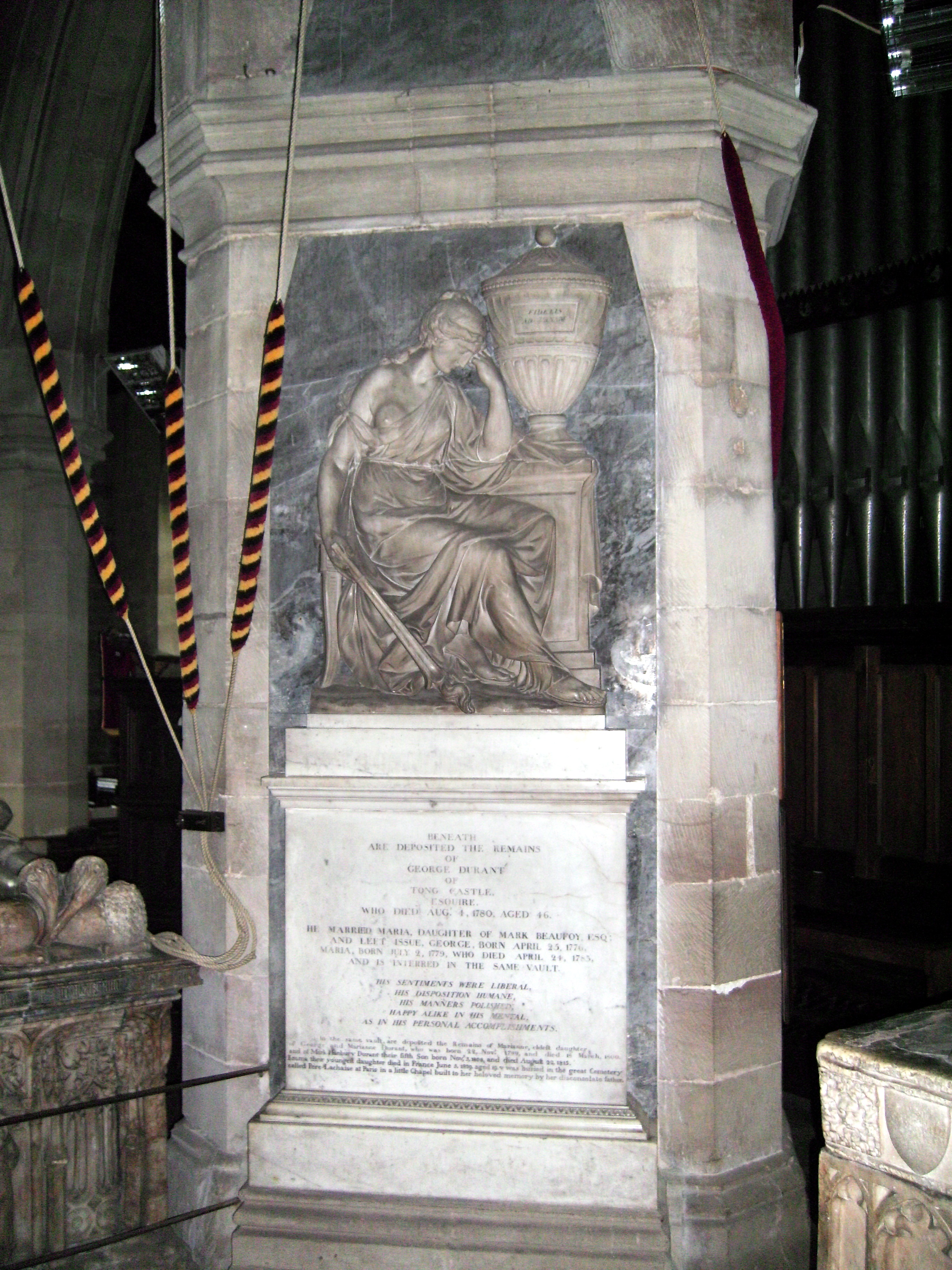
Memorial to George Durant (1731–1780), who bought the Tong estate in 1764.

== Tong Castle ==
Tong Castle was a large mostly Gothic country house, set within a park landscaped by Capability Brown, on the site of a medieval castle of the same name. Tong Castle's remains are now a Historic England Grade II listed site.

== Potential New Town Development ==
Since 2018, Bradford Estates, who own land around Tong and surrounding villages in the area, have been promoting a new settlement proposal to Shropshire Council to build an employment park creating 9,000 jobs, up to 3,000 homes with a village centre, medical facility, school and four public parks on land on west side of the A41 bounded by the M54, A5 and Lizard Hill. Some local residents formed an action group to stop the plans, including the local MP, Mark Pritchard. The proposal was eventually rejected in 2020 by Shropshire Council, but Bradford Estates are still continuing with the proposal in light of the need regionally for jobs and homes; later that year, a fresh consultation on the plans was renewed and is still ongoing.

== See also ==
- Listed buildings in Tong, Shropshire
