= Listed buildings in Tong, Shropshire =

Tong is a civil parish in Shropshire, England. It contains 48 listed buildings that are recorded in the National Heritage List for England. Of these, one is listed at Grade I, the highest of the three grades, two are at Grade II*, the middle grade, and the others are at Grade II, the lowest grade. The parish includes the village of Tong, and is otherwise rural. The M54 motorway passes through the parish, going through the site of Tong Castle, of which there are few remains on each side of the motorway, and which are listed. The most important building in the parish is the 13th-century St Bartholomew's Church, which is listed at Grade I; items in the churchyard are also listed. Most of the parish, including the village, is to the north of the motorway, and most of the listed buildings are houses, cottages, farmhouses, and farm buildings, the earliest of which are timber framed. South of the motorway is Ruckley Grange, a country house designed by Ernest George and Yeates in 1904. This, together with a number of associated structures, is listed. The other listed buildings include two milestones and a boundary marker.

== Key ==
Grade	Criteria
I	Buildings of exceptional interest, sometimes considered to be internationally important
II*	Particularly important buildings of more than special interest
II	Buildings of national importance and special interest

== Buildings ==
Name and location	Photograph	Date	Notes	Grade
Remains of Tong Castle (south); 52.65940°N 2.31062°W	—	12th century	The site of the castle is now divided by the M54 motorway. What remains to the south of the motorway consists of fragmentary remains of sandstone walls on natural rock.	II
St Bartholomew's Church; 52.66381°N 2.30364°W		c.1260	The church was largely rebuilt in about 1410, and restored by Ewan Christian in 1889–92. It is built in sandstone with lead roofs. The church consists of a nave, north and south aisles extending to form transepts, a south porch, a chancel with a south chapel and a north vestry, and a central tower with a spire. There are buttresses rising to pinnacles and most of the parapets are embattled. The tower has three stages, the second stage is square with corner pinnacles, above is an octagonal bell stage with an embattled parapet with pinnacles, and this is surmounted by a short spire with lucarnes and a finial with a weathervane. Inside the church are many monuments.	I
Remains of Tong Castle (north); 52.65978°N 2.30773°W	—	14th century	The site of the castle is now divided by the M54 motorway. What remains to the north of the motorway is in sandstone and red brick, and consists of parts of the stables and outbuildings, including barrel vaulted cellars, and part of a newel staircase.	II
Remains of almshouses 52.66392°N 2.30419°W		Early 15th century	All that remains of the almshouses is part of the north wall. It is in stone, about 25 metres (82 ft) long, and contains a central arched doorway with a hood mould, and two flanking windows with moulded arches and hood moulds.	II
Churchyard Cross Base and Sundial; 52.66362°N 2.30354°W		15th century	The cross base is in the churchyard of St Bartholomew's Church. It is in sandstone, and consists of four steps on which is a square cross base with carved heads at the corners. On the base is a round column and a sundial dated 1776. The structure is also a Scheduled Monument.	II*
Stable wing, Church Farmhouse; 52.66414°N 2.30286°W	—	c.1600	The stable wing has been altered and extended. It is timber framed on a sandstone plinth, with painted brick nogging, extensions in sandstone and red brick, and tile roofs. There is one storey, a front of two bays, the remains of one bay wt the rear, and a central carriage entrance. At the rear are two gabled eaves dormers, and an embattled parapet gable end.	II
Church Farmhouse; 52.66414°N 2.30261°W		Early 17th century	The farmhouse, at one time an inn, was partly refaced in brick and extended in the 19th century. It is timber framed with painted brick nogging on a sandstone plinth, with painted brick at the right and the rear, and a tile roof, hipped to the right. There are two storeys and an attic, and an L-shaped plan with a projecting bay on the right with a dentilled eaves cornice. The upper storey at the left is jettied with a moulded bressumer on brackets with carved heads. The windows in the main part are mullioned and transomed casements, and in the projecting bay is a sash window. Steps lead up to the doorway that has reeded pilasters and an entablature with a dentilled cornice.	II
Brookview Cottage; 52.67075°N 2.32092°W	—	17th century	A timber framed cottage with painted brick nogging and a tile roof. There is one storey and an attic, one bay, and a later lean-to on the west. The windows are casements.	II
Holly Tree Cottage; 52.66393°N 2.30211°W		17th century	The cottage was extended and altered in the 19th century. The original part is timber framed with painted brick nogging, it is partly refaced in brick, and has a sandstone rear wing and a tile roof. There is one storey with an attic, and an L-shaped plan with a front of two bays. The windows are casements, the door has trefoil-arched panels, and in the rear wing are three blank arches.	II
Barn, Vauxhall Farm; 52.66543°N 2.32293°W	—	17th century	The barn is timber framed on a sandstone plinth, with red brick nogging and a tile roof. There are three bays, and a 19th-century lean-to at the north end.	II
Willowbrook Cottage; 52.67045°N 2.30448°W	—	Mid 17th century	A farmhouse, later a private house, that has been altered and extended. The original part is timber framed on a stone plinth with red brick nogging, it has been partly refaced in brick and stone, and extended in brick, and has a tile roof. There is one storey and an attic, and an L-shaped plan, the original part with three bays, and with gabled eaves dormers. The west front has three bays, and casement windows, and in the angle is a block containing the entrance.	II
Haford; 52.66417°N 2.30214°W		Mid to late 17th century	A row of three timber framed cottages on a stone plinth with painted brick nogging and a tile roof. There is one storey and attics, and four bays. The windows are casements, and there are four eyebrow eaves dormers.	II
Outbuilding north of The Old Post Office; 52.66406°N 2.30196°W		Late 17th century	The outbuilding was extended in the 19th century. The original part is timber framed on a sandstone plinth with red brick nogging, the upper storey has been added in red brick, there is a single-storey extension in sandstone to the east, and the roof is tiled. The west front contains a blank recess with a pointed arch, the gable has dentilled coping, and in the north front is a loft door.	II
Byre with hayloft, Tong Norton Farm; 52.67039°N 2.30646°W	—	Late 17th century	The barn and hayloft are timber framed with red brick nogging, the ground floor is in brick, and the roof is tiled. There are two storeys and two bays. There are various openings, and external steps to an upper floor doorway.	II
Tong House; 52.66305°N 2.30175°W		Early 18th century	The house, originally a vicarage, was extended in the 19th century, and is in red brick with stone dressings and a tile roof. The original part has two storeys and an attic, five bays, giant end pilaster strips with moulded capitals, a cornice band, a panelled parapet, and parapeted gable ends with stone coping. Two steps lead to the central doorway that has an architrave, Doric pilasters, a full entablature, a keystone, and a segmental pediment. The windows are mullioned and transomed with segmental heads and triple keystones. To the right is the two-storey 19th-century extension.	II
Tong Park Farmhouse; 52.65791°N 2.28375°W	—	1736	A red brick farmhouse on a plinth, with a band, and a tile roof, hipped to the right. There are two storeys and five bays. The windows are a mix of cross-windows, casements, and mullioned and transomed windows, some with segmental heads, and some with keystones. The doorway has a rectangular fanlight, a segmental head and a keystone.	II
Knoll Farmhouse; 52.67476°N 2.30023°W	—	Mid 18th century	The farmhouse is in red brick with stone dressings on a stone plinth, with bands, a dentilled eaves cornice, and a tile roof with parapeted gable ends. There are three storeys and three bays, and recessed single-storey wings. In the centre is a timber framed gabled porch, and a doorway with an architrave, panelled reveals, and a two-light rectangular fanlight. Most of the windows are casements, those in the lower floors with segmental heads, and flanking the doorway are sash windows. The wings have parapets, end piers with urn finials, and contain cross-windows.	II
Meashill Farmhouse; 52.67153°N 2.26218°W	—	18th century	A red brick farmhouse on a plinth, with a string course and a hipped slate roof. There is an L-shaped plan, the main block with two storeys and three bays, and an 18th-century rear wing with one storey and an attic. The middle bay is slightly recessed, and contains a doorway approached by four steps, with Doric pilasters, a rectangular fanlight, an entablature, and a blocking course. The windows are sashes, those in the ground floor being tripartite.	II
Obelisk Milestone; 52.67027°N 2.30937°W		18th century	The milestone is in sandstone and consists of a tapering square obelisk on a base with two steps that is reputed to be a medieval wayside cross base. It is inscribed with the distances in miles to Brewood and Lichfield, Albrighton and London, Shifnal and Salop (Shrewsbury), and Newport and Chester.	II
Convent Lodge; 52.65673°N 2.29934°W	—	c. 1765	A former lodge to Tong Castle, it is in sandstone with a felt roof, and is in Gothick style. There are two storeys and a square plan, with later additions to the south. The lodge is on a plinth, with end pilaster strips, string courses, and a coped parapet. There are various openings with pointed-arched heads.	II
Wall and remains of pulpit near Convent Lodge; 52.65658°N 2.29903°W	—	1765 (probable)	There are the remains of an octagonal wall pulpit associated with a wall dated 1821. They are in sandstone, and the wall is about 40 metres (130 ft) long and about 1.5 metres (4 ft 11 in) high. It contains niches, and panels carved with various motifs.	II
The Red House; 52.66353°N 2.30177°W		1766	A red brick house on a moulded stone plinth, with giant angle pilaster strips, a moulded eaves cornice, and a tile roof with coped parapeted gables. There are three storeys and three bays, and a two-storey rear wing. The windows are mullioned and transomed casements with projecting keystones. The central doorway has a molded architrave, a frieze and a cornice, and a wrought iron lattice porch with a tented hood. Attached to the right is a two-storey outbuilding.	II
Durant headstone 52.66390°N 2.30357°W	—	Late 18th century	The headstone is in the churchyard of St Bartholomew's Church, and is to the memory of a member of the Durant family. The headstone is in sandstone, and consists of a large inscribed Maltese cross.	II
Lizard Grange; 52.68857°N 2.31573°W	—	Late 18th century	A red brick farmhouse on a stone plinth, with a dentilled eaves cornice and a tile roof. There are three storeys, three bays, and a two-storey rear outshut. The central doorway has Tuscan pilasters, an entablature, and an open triangular pediment. The windows are sashes with segmental heads.	II
New Buildings Farmhouse; 52.65704°N 2.29635°W	—	Late 18th century	The farmhouse is in red brick with stone dressings on a plinth, with bands, a dentilled eaves cornice, and a tile roof, and is in Neo-Palladian style. There are three storeys, three bays, and taller pavilions at the ends with pyramidal roofs. The windows are casements with segmental heads and tiled cills. In the centre is a large blocked arch with an architrave, impost blocks, and a keystone. There are two doors with segmental heads, and in the pavilions are recessed blind round arches.	II
Solhagen; 52.66905°N 2.32443°W	—	Late 18th century	A timber framed cottage on a brick plinth with brick nogging and a tile roof. There is one storey and an attic, and a T-shaped plan, with a front of three bays. The windows are casements.	II
Tong Lodge; 52.65862°N 2.32191°W	—	Late 18th century	A tower expanded into a house in the 19th century, it is in red brick with slate roofs. The octagonal tower has been partly encased by a house with an H-plan. The tower has an embattled parapet and a pyramidal roof with a weathervane. The house has two storeys, and the entrance front contains a gabled half-dormer and a canted oriel window. There are flanking wings with canted bay windows.	II
Boundary marker 52.65626°N 2.29924°W	—	Late 18th or early 19th century (probable)	The marker indicates the boundary between the parishes of Tong and Donington. It is in sandstone, and consists of a low rectangular pillar with a pyramidal top and inscribed initials.	II
Milestone, Acorn Cottage; 52.68062°N 2.24419°W		Late 18th or early 19th century	The milestone is on the north side of the road adjacent to the cottage garden, It is in sandstone, and has a square plan and a pyramidal top. There are inscriptions on three faces indicating the directions to Shifnal, to Brewood, and to Tong. Also on the milestone is an Ordnance Survey benchmark.	II
The Old Post Office; 52.66378°N 2.30179°W		Late 18th or early 19th century	Originally the North Lodge to Tong Castle, the southeast part was rebuilt in about 1946. The original part is in sandstone and in Gothick style, and the new part is in brick with stone dressings, it is in Neo-Georgian style, and both parts have tile roofs. The older part has two storeys, a doorway with reeded pilasters, a fanlight with Gothick tracery, and an open triangular pediment, and to the left is a two-storey canted bay window with a string course and a parapet. The newer part is on a plinth, it has a string course, one storey and an attic, and three bays facing the road, the middle bay projecting and with a triangular pedimented gable. The windows are casements, the central window in the upper floor is a Venetian window, and under it is a coat of arms. At the rear is a courtyard with an embattled wall.	II
Former gateway, walls and bollards, Tong Castle; 52.66363°N 2.30227°W		Late 18th or early 19th century	The gates are in wrought iron and the piers and walls are in sandstone. There are square gate and end piers with dentilled coping, and between them are walls about 1 metre (3 ft 3 in) high and 5 metres (16 ft) long. Outside these are lower retaining walls, and behind these are iron bollards with chain links between them.	II
Wall, Tong Norton Farm; 52.67058°N 2.30623°W	—	Late 18th or early 19th century	The wall is in sandstone and is about 50 metres (160 ft) long and 1.5 metres (4 ft 11 in) high, curving at the west end. It has chamfered coping and intermediate and end piers with pyramidal coping. The wall is decorated with recessed Latin and Maltese crosses.	II
Pig sty, Acorn Cottage; 52.68095°N 2.24462°W	—	c. 1818	The pig sty is in stone and in Egyptian style, and consists of a pyramid on a square base. The base is coped, it contains a small entrance, and there are tall rectangular openings in the pyramid. On the corners are piers with pyramidal finials, and on the east side is an inscribed plaque.	II
Fowl House, Vauxhall Farm; 52.66540°N 2.32222°W	—	1820s (probable)	The fowl house consists of a square sandstone base on which is a tall brick pyramid in Egyptian style. The base is coped and has a low entrance. The pyramid has dentilled string courses with diamond openings between, and a stone obelisk finial with oval openings.	II
1–4 Newport Road; 52.66340°N 2.30148°W		Early 19th century	The former almshouses are in red brick on a plinth, with stone dressings and a hipped tile roof. They have one storey and a U-shaped plan. In the centre of the east range is a round archway over which is a triangular pedimented gable. The doorways and the windows, which are casements, have segmental heads.	II
Former Stable Block, The Bell Inn; 52.67033°N 2.30971°W	—	Early 19th century	The former stable block is in sandstone with some brick at the rear and a tile roof, and is in Gothic style. There is one storey and an attic, and an L-shaped plan. On the front are six blind square and straight-sided arched windows, and a central blind straight-sided arched doorway, and in the left gable end is a blind loft window.	II
Kennels, The Red House; 52.66376°N 2.30064°W	—	Early 19th century	Pigsties, later used as kennels, the building is in sandstone with brick dressings, a dentilled eaves cornice, and a tile roof. It contains two blocked round-arched windows flanking a blocked round-arched doorway, and a loft door. There is a later dwarf wall with railings.	II
Tong Hall; 52.66289°N 2.30132°W		c. 1840	A house in red brick with dressings and decoration in coloured brick that was later extended. The original part is in Gothic style, and has an interrupted dentilled string course, and parapeted gables. There are two bays facing the road under a gable and containing segmental-headed cross-windows. The right front has blind pointed-arched windows with Y-tracery, and contains a casement window and a door with trefoil-arched panels. To the north is an extension with two bays facing the road containing casement windows and two gabled half-dormers, and there is a further extension beyond it, with a gable facing the road.	II
Knoll Lodge; 52.67768°N 2.30026°W		1882	The lodge, at the entrance to the grounds of Weston Park, is in sandstone on a plinth, with quoins, a moulded cornice, and a slate roof, and is in Queen Anne style. There are triangular pedimented gable ends that have circular panels with keystones in the tympana. The porch has a round arch with a keystone and the doorway has a moulded architrave. The windows are sashes in architraves, and there is a canted bay window with a cornice.	II
The Knoll Tower; 52.68002°N 2.29298°W		1883	The tower is in the grounds of Weston Park. It is in stone and has a square plan, with an octagonal stair turret, and is in Tudor style. The tower has three stages and the turret has four, and both have embattled parapets. In the lower stages of the tower and in the turret are rectangular windows, and the top stage contains square mullioned windows.	II
Ruckley Grange and terraces 52.65656°N 2.32759°W	—	1904	A country house designed by Ernest George and Yeates in Elizabethan style. It is in sandstone on a plinth, with a string course, a moulded eaves cornice, and tile roofs with parapeted gables and obelisk finials. There are two storeys and an attic, and an irregular H-shaped plan. The entrance front has a central three-storey gabled porch with a four-centred arched doorway with impost mouldings and a keystone, flanking pilasters, a frieze and a cornice, and a coat of arms. On the west front is a two-storey two-bay loggia. The windows are mullioned and transomed, and there are dormers. To the west and south is a terrace with dwarf walls, and steps down to the lawn.	II*
Ruckley Lodge; 52.65824°N 2.32345°W		c. 1904	The lodge at the entrance to the drive is roughcast with a tile roof. It was probably designed by Ernest George and Yeates, and is in Arts and Crafts style. There is one storey and an attic, a lean-to porch with a lunette on the side, and a lean-to scullery at the rear. The other windows are casements with moulded cornices, and on the east front is a square bay window. The gables have moulded bargeboards and carved pendants.	II
Gazebo and retaining wall, Ruckley Grange; 52.65564°N 2.32733°W	—	c. 1904	The gazebo and retaining walls of the ornamental basin were designed by Ernest George and Yeates. The gazebo is in Neo-Jacobean style, it is in sandstone and has an ogee copper roof. There is one storey and a square plan, and it contains Doric pilasters, a frieze, a cornice, and round-arched openings with continuous impost mouldings and keystones. Steps lead down to a pool with sandstone walls, a cruciform plan, and a central fountain.	II
Gates, Standards, Walls and Railings, north of Ruckley Grange; 52.65747°N 2.32794°W	—	c. 1904	On the drive to the north of the house are wrought iron gates and sandstone standards with decorative finials. There is an elaborate overthrow with a central shield, and flanking dwarf walls with railings.	II
Gate, Standards, Walls and Railings, northeast of Ruckley Grange; 52.65756°N 2.32597°W	—	c. 1904	On the drive to the northeast of the house are wrought iron gates and standards with an Arts and Crafts design. There are flanking dwarf walls with railings.	II
Stable block, Ruckley Grange; 52.65685°N 2.32709°W	—	c. 1904	The service block was designed by Ernest George and Yeates in Elizabethan style. It is roughcast with ashlar dressings and tile roofs, and forms a rectangular courtyard plan. It is partly in one storey, and partly in two, and there is a water tower on the north side, with three stages, and a stepped embattled parapet. On the south side is a central entrance with a round arch, above which is a cupola with a clock, and an ogee cap with a weathervane.	II
Retaining wall, Ruckley Grange; 52.65628°N 2.32724°W	—	1904	The wall to the south of the house was designed by Ernest George and Yeates. It is in sandstone and is balustraded, about 100 metres (330 ft) long and 2 metres (6 ft 7 in) high, and curves towards the south. It has turned balusters and square piers, and to the west are four flights of balustraded steps.	II
Walled Garden, Ruckley Grange; 52.65678°N 2.32646°W	—	1904	The walled garden was designed by Ernest George and Yeates in Elizabethan style. The walls are in red brick and sandstone with stone dressings and coping. They enclose a rectangular area of about 35 metres (115 ft) by 25 metres (82 ft), and are about 3 metres (9.8 ft) high. In the corners are square stone piers with obelisk finials, and the entrance in the south wall has a depressed arch, a keystone, and a wrought iron gate with an overthrow.	II
