= George Durant (1731–1780) =

British landowner and politician

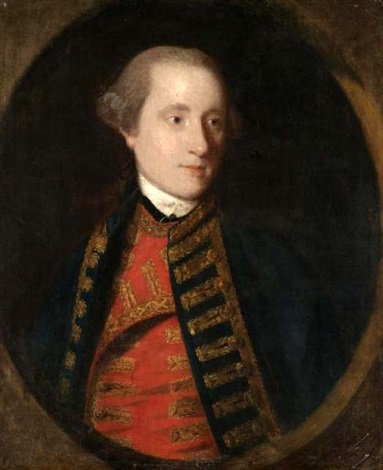
Portrait of George Durant by Sir Joshua Reynolds

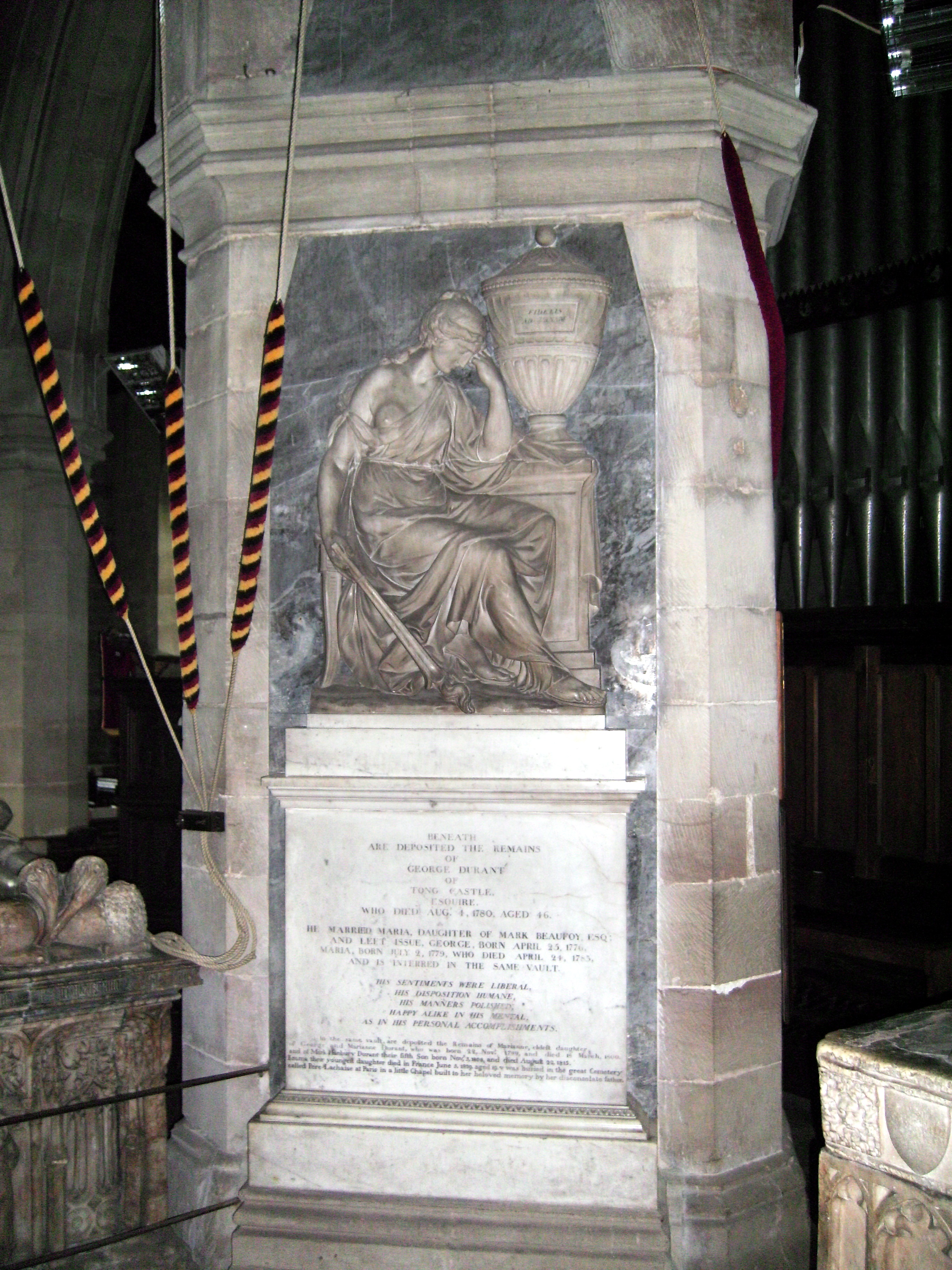
Memorial to George Durant in St Bartholomew's church, Tong. The inscription understates age as 46.

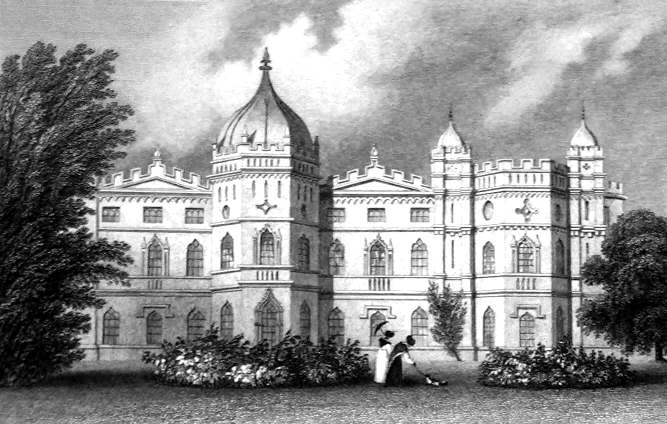
Tong Castle

George Durant (20 November 1731 – 4 August 1780) was a British landowner and politician.

== Life ==
Durant was born the second son of the Reverend Josiah Durant, rector of Hagley, Worcestershire and educated at St Edmund Hall, Oxford.

As a young man he had an affair with Elizabeth Lyttleton, the second wife of George Lyttelton, the Chancellor of the Exchequer. To escape the consequent scandal he became a senior clerk in the Army Pay Office and was sent with the Army as paymaster on an expedition to Havana, which was a lucrative posting. On his return as a wealthy man he purchased the village of Tong in Shropshire from the Duke of Kingston in 1764, knocked down the ancient Tong Castle, and built in its place a new house in a unique style based on plans drawn up by Capability Brown.

Between 1768 and 1774 he was Member of Parliament for Evesham. He stood for election again in 1774 but was badly defeated. Two weeks before the next general election in which he reportedly hoped to stand again for Evesham, he died in 1780 aged 48 and was buried in St Bartholomew's Church, Tong.

He had married Maria, the daughter of Mark Beaufoy, with whom he had a son, also named George, and a daughter.

Tong Castle passed to his son, who proved to be a somewhat lascivious Lord of the Manor.
