= William Armfield Hobday =

English painter

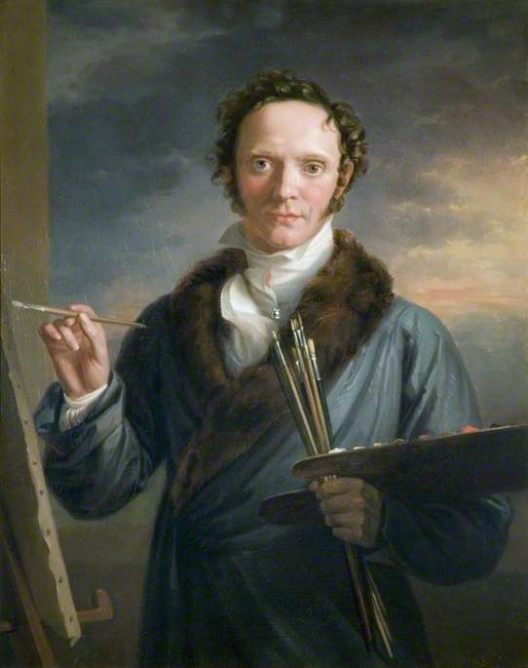
Self portrait (1814)

William Armfield Hobday (1771 – 17 February 1831) was an English portrait painter and miniaturist whose clientele included royalty and the Rothschild family.

== Life ==
Hobday was born in Birmingham, the eldest of 4 sons of Samuel Hobday (1746–1816), a rich Birmingham spoon manufacturer. Showing a capacity for drawing, he was sent to London when still a boy, and articled to an engraver named William Barney, with whom he remained for six years, studying at the same time in the Royal Academy schools. He then established himself in Charles Street, near the Middlesex Hospital, as a painter of miniatures and watercolour portraits, and commenced to exhibit at the Royal Academy in 1794. He was fortunate in soon securing a fashionable clientele, married Elizabeth Ivory (from Worcester), and in 1800 moved to Holles Street, Cavendish Square, where, supported largely by his father, he lived for a short time in a recklessly expensive manner.

In 1804 he left London for Bristol, where for some years he was largely employed in painting the portraits of officers embarking for the Peninsular War. Though Hobday earned large sums, he continued to be extravagant and in financial difficulties. In 1817, after the war ended, Hobday returned to the capital, and took a large house in Broad Street, hoping to renew his earlier artistic and social connections. In this he was disappointed even though patronised by N. M. Rothschild, for whom he painted a family group at the price of a thousand guineas. In 1821 he moved to 54 Pall Mall, which had large galleries attached to it and, after a disastrous speculative venture in a panoramic exhibition, called the "Poecilorama" at the Egyptian Hall, opened these galleries for the sale of pictures on commission. Though supported by all the leading English and many French artists, the venture proved a complete failure, and in 1820 Hobday went bankrupt.

In 1831, Hobday married Maria Pearce Ustonson (born Maria Pearce in Exeter in 1784). He died on 17 February of that same year.

One of Hobday's sons was George Armfield Smith (1808–1893) who became a celebrated dog painter. His daughter, Harriet Eliza, married English composer Robert Lucas de Pearsall (1795–1856).

== Work ==
Throughout his chequered career Hobday was a constant exhibitor at the Royal Academy, frequently contributing even during his residence at Bristol. In 1819 he exhibited there a portrait of the Duke of Sussex. His best work was a picture of Carolus the Hermit of Tong - whereabouts presently unknown. His portrait of Miss Biggs in the character of Cora, and that of Richard Reynolds, the Bristol Quaker philanthropist, were engraved, the latter by William Sharp. He was always well patronised, and obtained good prices for his works, but the quality of his art suffered greatly from his restless and improvident habits.

Hobday's more important clients included the pioneer vaccinologist Dr Edward Jenner, King George IV (the portrait last being sold at Christie’s in 1911) and the Rothschild family. Hobday was also a close friend of fellow artist George Morland, and painted his portrait.

== Notes ==
Attribution

This article incorporates text from a publication now in the public domain: "Hobday, William Armfield". Dictionary of National Biography. London: Smith, Elder & Co. 1885–1900.
