= Tong Castle =

Former country house in Shropshire, England

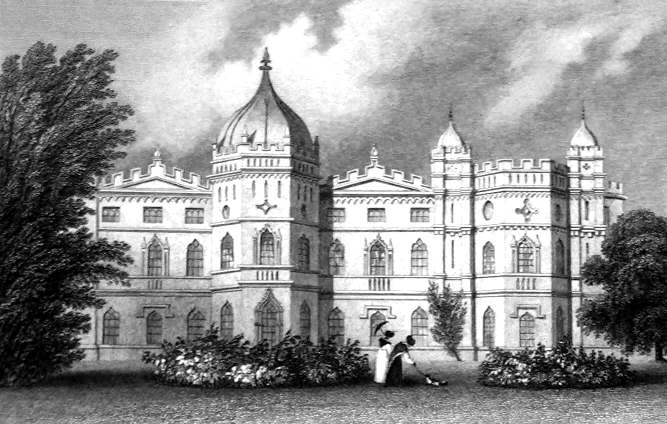
- Tong Castle around 1850

- Location within Shropshire

General information
- Architectural style: Gothic architecture
- Location: Shropshire, England
- Coordinates: 52°39′50.4″N 2°18′10.8″W
- Demolished: 1954

Design and construction
- Designations: Grade II

Tong Castle was a very large mostly Gothic country house near the village of Tong in Shropshire whose site is between Wolverhampton and Telford, set within a park landscaped by Capability Brown, on the site of a medieval castle of the same name.

== History ==
The original castle was built in the 12th century. During the Civil War it was defended for the King by William Careless, and afterwards by George Mainwaring. The original structure was demolished in 1765 after the estate had been purchased from the Duke of Kingston by George Durant who built the house illustrated.

The building has been described both as an "architectural mongrel" and more flatteringly as "the first real gothic building in Shropshire". While at first glance there appear some anomalies of design, such as the ogee domes which, though Gothic in shape, are more redolent of the English Renaissance style, the house was actually in the Strawberry Hill Gothic style popularised by Horace Walpole.

George Durant bought the estate at Tong in 1764 and commissioned Lancelot "Capability" Brown to provide plans for rebuilding the castle and to improve the landscape around the castle in 1765. Brown's account book shows a charge to Durant in 1765 for "Various Plans for the alterations of Tong Castle. My Journeys there several times" covering both the house and grounds, and making it Brown's first commission in Shropshire. Water features north and south of the castle were altered to create Church or North Pool and the serpentine South Pool and two larger lakes were built following Capability Brown's plans. The kitchen garden was moved further from the house and it is suggested that Brown was responsible for installing an ice house. The Tudor Tong Castle was remodelled in the Gothic style, only retaining the main block of the 16th century red-brick castle. Some of the stone from the college that had stood near Tong church was reused in the new building.

Walpole's Gothic house at Strawberry Hill was begun in 1749, expanded in 1760, and completed in 1776. Thus the comparatively early date of 1765 for Tong Castle to be erected in this fairly rare style would today have made Tong of the highest architectural grading class. The crenellated towers and pediments coupled with the paned, rather than traditional Gothic leaded, windows crowned by ogee curves are typical of this style, as too are the generous bay windows with circular windows and cruciform motifs in the upper levels. The later 19th-century Gothic tended to be more ecclesiastical and sombre in mood, with dark rooms lit by lancet windows while the earlier Gothic had larger windows and a "joie de vivre" of design not found in later versions of the style.

In 1756, Maria Fitzherbert (born Mary Ann Smythe) was born in Tong Castle, reputedly in the Red Room, when it was still owned by the Duke of Kingston; she may have been his illegitimate daughter. Mrs Fitzherbert eventually married George IV (when he was the Prince of Wales) after being twice widowed. She died in Brighton in 1837 without being formally recognised as George IV's wife due to her Catholic lineage and that official sanction to the marriage had not been given by George's father, King George III.

The house passed from the Durant family in 1854 to the Earl of Bradford. The Earl had no wish to live at Tong but expanded his estate in the area and let the house, chiefly to the Hartley family of Wolverhampton who leased it between 1856 and 1909.

In 1911 the house was damaged by fire and remained unrestored and increasingly structurally unstable until demolished in 1954 by the Army.

Flagstones from Tong Castle were used for paving at the outdoor war memorial built in 1920 at the nearby village of Albrighton.

== Today ==
The site is currently part of the route of the M54 motorway. Features of Capability Brown's work can still be seen at Tong, including foundations of the castle, Church Pool and clumps of oak and beech trees. Tong Castle is a Grade II Listed site for its special architectural or historic interest and its Historic England list entry number is 1176612. Tong Castle was first listed on 29 August 1984.

== See also ==
- Listed buildings in Tong, Shropshire
