= Maria Ustonson =

Maria Ustonson was the daughter-in-law of Onesimus Ustonson, founder of the London-based fishing tackle maker, Ustonson. She was married to his third son, Charles Ustonson (1775-1822), who took over the business in 1815, but when he died in 1822, his widow Maria Ustonson took over.

Under Maria, Ustonson received a Royal Warrant from three successive monarchs starting with King George IV.

In 1830, she married the portrait painter William Armfield Hobday, and after his death in 1831, married Robert Joy in 1833.
