= Thomas Crompton (Parliamentarian) =

English politician

Thomas Crompton was an English politician who sat in the House of Commons at various times between 1647 and 1660.

Crompton was the son of Sir Thomas Crompton of Stafford. He subscribed at the University of Oxford on 1 July 1614 and was called to the bar at Lincoln's Inn in 1621.

In 1647, Crompton was elected Member of Parliament for Staffordshire in the Long Parliament and survived Pride's Purge to sit in the Rump Parliament. He was elected MP for Staffordshire again in 1654 for the First Protectorate Parliament, in 1656 for the Second Protectorate Parliament and in 1659 for the Third Protectorate Parliament. He was also restored in 1659 as a member of the Rump Parliament.

Parliament of England
Preceded by John Bowyer; Sir Richard Skeffington	Member of Parliament for Staffordshire; 1647–1653; With: John Bowyer 1647–1648	Succeeded by George Bellot; John Chetwood
Preceded by George Bellot; John Chetwood	Member of Parliament for Staffordshire; 1654–1660; With: Sir Charles Wolseley 1654–1656; Thomas Whitgrave 1654–1659	Succeeded by Edward Bagot; William Sneyd
