= Thomas Crompton =

Thomas Crompton may refer to:

- Thomas Crompton (died 1601), English MP for Steyning, Radnor, Leominster and Beverley
- Thomas Crompton (died c.1607), English MP for Newton (Isle of Wight) (UK Parliament constituency) and Newport, Isle of Wight
- Thomas Crompton (died 1608), English politician who sat in the House of Commons at various times between 1597 and 1609
- Thomas Crompton (died 1645) (c. 1580–1645), English MP for Staffordshire (UK Parliament constituency) 1614, 1621 and 1628
- Thomas Crompton (Parliamentarian), English politician who sat in the House of Commons at various times between 1647 and 1660

== See also ==
- Thomas Compton, American football player
