= Richard Skeffington =

English landowner and politician

Sir Richard Skeffington (died 2 June 1647) was an English landowner and politician who sat in the House of Commons at various times between 1625 and 1647.

Skeffington was born after 1590, the second son of Sir William Skeffington, 1st Baronet of Fisherwick, Staffordshire, and his wife Elizabeth Dering of Surrenden, Kent. He matriculated from Magdalene College, Cambridge, in autumn 1615. He was knighted on 20 August 1624. In 1625, he was elected Member of Parliament for Tamworth. He was elected MP for Staffordshire as a recruiter to the Long Parliament in 1646.

Skeffington died in 1647 and was buried at Broxbourne, Hertfordshire, where there is a monument.

Skeffington married Anne Newdigate, daughter of Sir John Newdigate of Arbury, Warwickshire. His son was John Skeffington, who inherited the Massereene viscountcy in 1665.

Parliament of England
Preceded by John Woodford; John Wightwick	Member of Parliament for Tamworth; 1625; With: Sir Thomas Puckering	Succeeded by Sir Thomas Puckering; Sir Walter Devereux
Preceded by Sir Edward Littleton; Sir Hervey Bagot	Member of Parliament for Staffordshire; 1646–1647; With: John Bowyer	Succeeded by John Bowyer; Thomas Crompton
