= John Weddell =

English sea captain (1583–1642)

John Weddell (1583–1642) was an English sea captain who served for the Muscovy Company and then the East India Company (EIC).

== Career ==
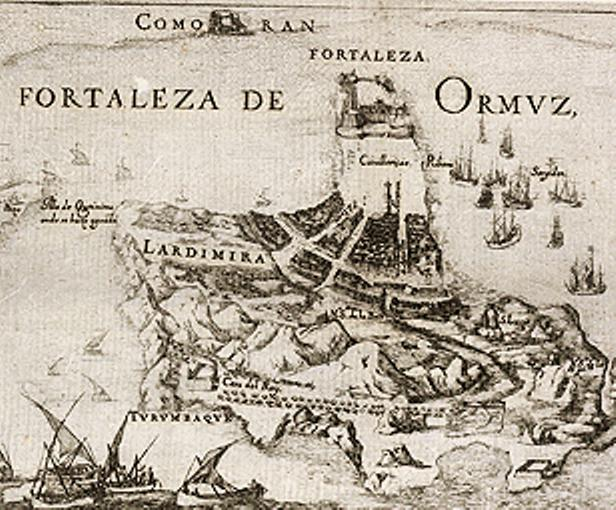
The city and fortress of Ormuz, 17th century

From May to August 1617 he was master or master's mate of the Muscovy Company's ship Dragon, which was vice-admiral of the whaling fleet sent to Spitsbergen. In July the Dragon sailed into Hornsund, where he seized the cargo of the Vlissingen ship de Arcke Noë ("Noah's Ark"), under Jan Verelle, before driving it away ballasted with stones. In the depositions given of the voyage in January of the following year he was described as "John Weddell, alias Duke, of Lymehorst, mariner".

In October 1617 Weddell was named as being one of the master's mates of the EIC's ship Dragon, but in December he was promoted to commander or master of the Lion. He left in the spring of 1618 and returned to England in September 1620. In April 1621, he was captain of the Jonas and given command of three other EIC ships. As joint-admiral of an English fleet of five ships and four pinnaces, he participated in the Anglo-Persian attack on Kishm and siege of Ormuz early in 1622. In giving a detailed account of the voyage and plunder to the High Court of Admiralty in December 1623, he was described as "of Ratcliffe, in Middlesex, gent., aged 40 or thereabouts".

Given command of the Royal James, Weddell again sailed as commander of the EIC's fleet to India in March 1624. Soon after reaching Surat in September, he was sent to Gombroon (Bandar-Abbas) to combine with a Dutch squadron to fight the Portuguese. In a hard-fought three-day battle they defeated the Portuguese fleet, which fled to Goa. After his return to England in 1626 he came under the Company's scrutiny for irregular or illegal private trading; the suit against him was later "privately arranged".

In 1627 and 1628 he commanded the King's ship Rainbow. By December of the latter year he had returned to the service of the EIC, being given command of the Charles. Despite again being censured for private trading on his return to England in April 1631, he was given command of the same vessel in 1632. From the carelessness of the master of the Swallow, the Charles was burnt at Surat in January 1633. Weddell lost his entire estate aboard the vessel, while the master of the Swallow returned to England in irons. The court refused to give him another commission and ship, instead ordering him to return aboard the Jonas.

Weddell carried home the news of William Methwold's Goa Convention, which ceased hostilities with the Portuguese and allowed the English access to their Indian resources; he now sought revenge for his treatment at the hands of the EIC. In early 1636, Weddell was given command of six ships financed by the interloper Sir William Courten of the Courteen association, who had received a patent from the King in December 1635 to trade in the East Indies.

Four of the six ships that had embarked from southern England, in April 1636, arrived at Macao in July 1637. In August 1637, the English stormed a Chinese fort and hoisted the flag of St. George but, on September 9, a fleet of Chinese fire-ships was launched in the middle of the night to annihilate the English's fleet. Casualties and deaths were suffered by both Chinese and English in several such engagements. In the autumn of 1637, half a dozen English/Scottish merchants were detained and imprisoned in the suburbs of Canton for more than three months.

After failing to establish trade in Canton, he went back to India, where he succeeded in establishing a trade at Rajapur. He apparently returned to England in 1640; two years later he again sailed to India as an interloper. There he died.

== Bibliography ==
- Lee, Sidney, ed. (1899). "Weddell, John" . Dictionary of National Biography. Vol. 60. London: Smith, Elder & Co.
- Conway, William Martin (1906). No Man's Land: A History of Spitsbergen from Its Discovery in 1596 to the Beginning of the Scientific Exploration of the Country. Cambridge: Cambridge University Press.
- Grey, Charles; George Fletcher MacMunn (1932). The Merchant ventures of London. A record of Far Eastern trade & piracy during the seventeenth century. London: H.F. & G. Witherby.
- Coates, Austin (1988) [1966]. Macao and the British, 1637-1842: Prelude to Hongkong. Oxford: Oxford University Press.
