= Courten =

Courten is a surname. Notable people with the surname include:

- Courten baronets

== See also ==
- William Courteen (1572–1636), English merchant
- De Courten
