= Richard Penderel =

English royalist

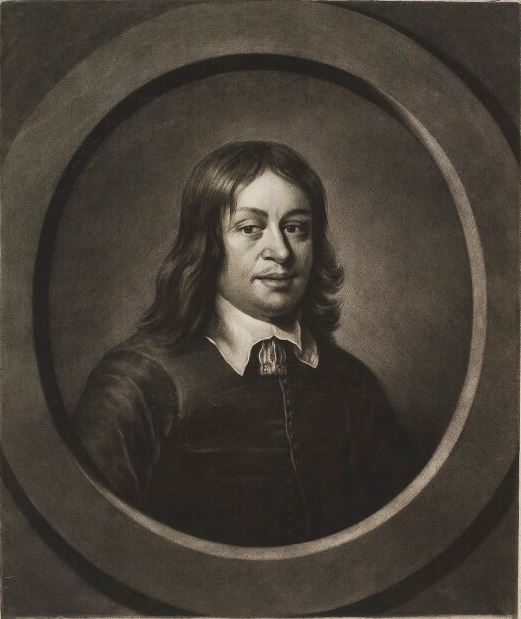
Richard "Trusty Dick" Penderel

Richard Penderel (c.1606 – 7 February 1672) was a Roman Catholic farmer, and a supporter of the Royalist cause during the English Civil War. He assisted with the escape of Charles II after the Battle of Worcester in September 1651.

== Biography ==
Penderel was born in Tong, Shropshire, of yeoman stock, the third son of William Penderel. His family were Catholic, and were the tenants of the farm of Hobbal Grange in Tong. Their landlord was another Catholic, Basil Fitzherbert of Boscobel House, about 3 miles (4.8 km) away.

Richard Penderel was the life tenant of the farm by 1651, by which time it is assumed that his father had already died. Early in the morning of 4 September 1651, Penderel was summoned to meet the king, Charles II, at White Ladies Priory, in Shropshire, shortly after Charles had fled from the field of the Battle of Worcester. Penderel's second eldest brother John and youngest brother George were servants at the priory, while another brother Humphrey ran the mill nearby. Richard Penderel was charged with protecting the king. He disguised Charles as a woodman, "William Jones", giving him a rough haircut and some of Penderel's own clothes, and hid Charles in a coppice while it rained during the rest of the day. He took Charles to his farmhouse that evening, before starting on the journey to Wales. In the morning, they sought shelter at Madeley from Francis Wolfe, another Catholic of Penderel's acquaintance, but finding the crossings of the River Severn were guarded by Oliver Cromwell's soldiers, they returned to Hobbal Grange on Saturday 5 September. Charles travelled on to Boscobel House, where Penderel's eldest brother William was caretaker. William Penderel provided Charles with a ladder to hide along with Colonel William Careless in the Royal Oak (sometimes known as "Penderel's Oak") and distracted the soldiers who were searching for him.

John Penderell happened to meet Father John Huddleston who suggested the King should go to Moseley Hall on the night of 7 September, Huddleston cleaned and bandaged the King's sore feet there. On 9 September, Parliamentary troops arrived on a search and questioned the owner of the house Thomas Whitgrave, while the King and Huddleston were hiding there in a priest hole. The troops were persuaded that Whitgrave had not fought at Worcester in 1645 even though he had, and been captured at the Battle of Naseby. The troops were persuaded to leave without searching the house.

On 12 September, the five Penderel brothers formed the bodyguard of the king on his overnight journey from Boscobel House to Moseley Hall near Wolverhampton, with the king riding on Humphrey's old mill horse.

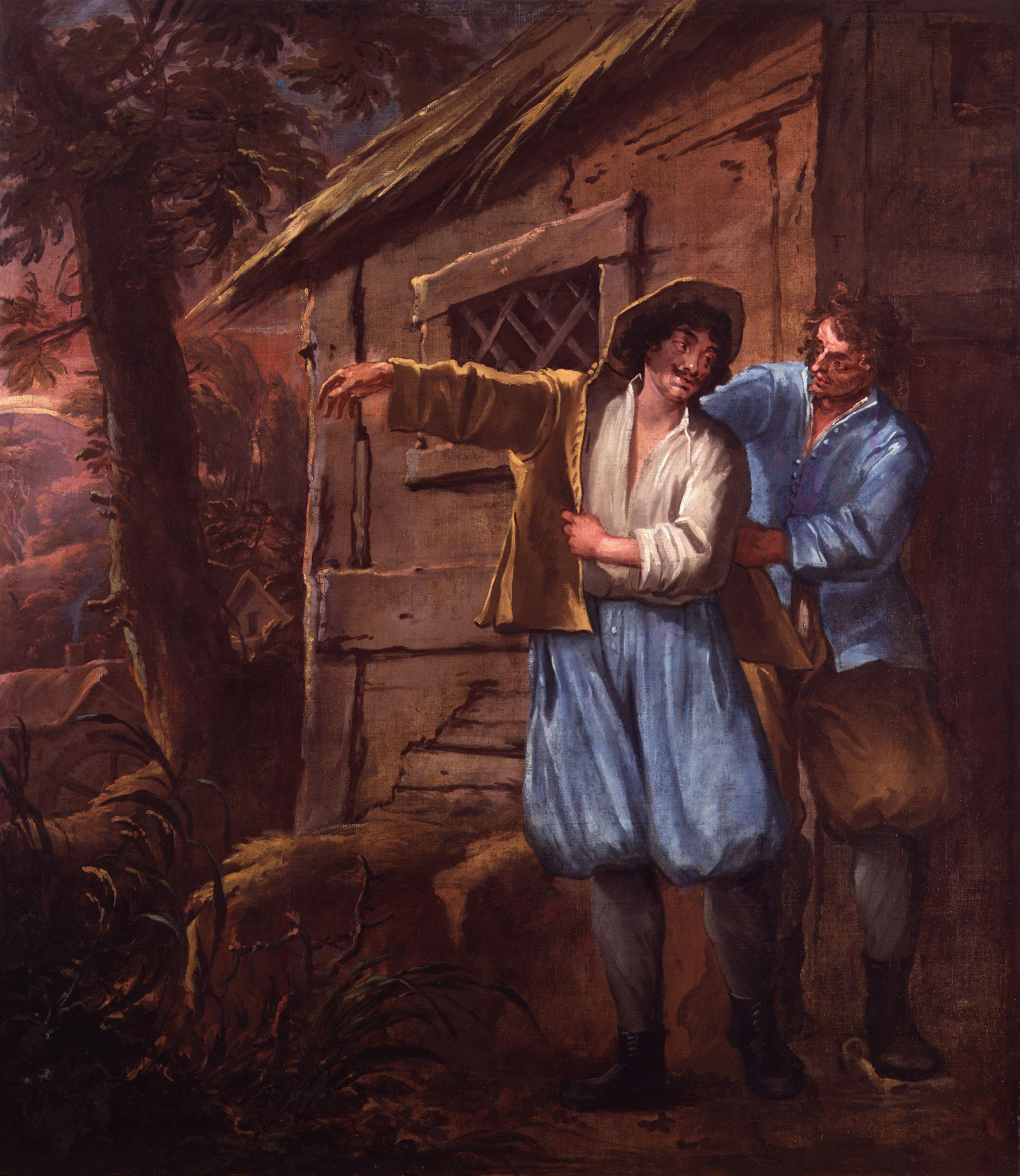
Isaac Fuller, King Charles II at Whiteladies, c.1660

Penderel was suspected of Royalist sympathies during the Commonwealth, but kept a low profile and was left unmolested. He was rewarded on the Restoration, welcomed at Charles II's court in June 1660. He was given a reward of £200 and an annuity of £100 for him and his heirs in April 1662.

Penderel contracted a fever and died while visiting London, and was buried at St Giles-in-the-Fields. He was survived by his other brothers, who all benefitted from royal patronage. They all received pensions, and royal exemption from prosecutions for recusancy after the Popish Plot.
