= William Bowyer (MP) =

English politician (1588–1641)

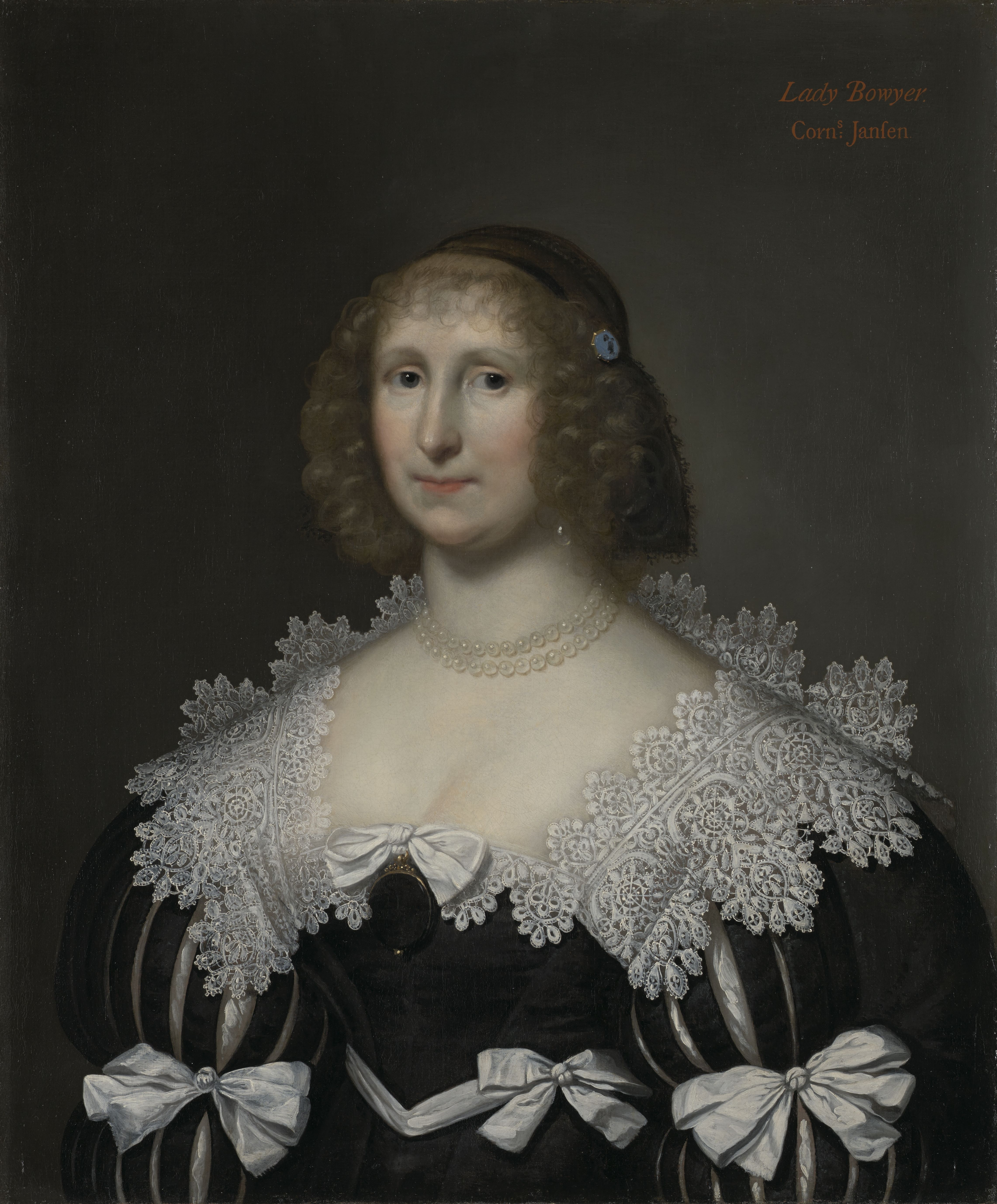
William Bowyer married Hester Skeffington (pictured), daughter of William Skeffington.

Sir William Bowyer (c. 1588 – 1641) was an English politician who sat in the House of Commons at various times between 1620 and 1641.

Bowyer was the son of Sir John Bowyer of Knypersley Hall in Staffordshire. He became wealthy from coal and iron mines at Biddulph and Tunstall.

Bowyer was elected Member of Parliament for Staffordshire in 1621 and was re-elected for the seat in 1624 and 1626. In April 1640 he was re-elected MP for Staffordshire in the Short Parliament and again in November 1640 for the Long Parliament, but died at the beginning of 1641.

Bowyer married Hester Skeffington, daughter of Sir William Skeffington of Fisherwick, Staffordshire. Their son John became an MP and baronet.

Parliament of England
Preceded by Walter Chetwynd; Thomas Crompton	Member of Parliament for Staffordshire; 1621–1624, 1626; With: Thomas Crompton 1621–1622; Sir Edward Littleton 1624; Simon Weston 1626	Succeeded by Sir Hervey Bagot, 1st Baronet; Sir Thomas Crompton
Parliament suspended since 1629	Member of Parliament for Staffordshire; 1640–1641; With: Sir Edward Littleton, 1st Baronet	Succeeded by Sir Hervey Bagot, 1st Baronet; Sir Edward Littleton, 1st Baronet
