= Courtens =

Courtens is a surname. Notable people with the surname include:

- Michelle Courtens (born 1981), Dutch singer
- Franz Courtens (1854–1943), Belgian painter

== See also ==
- Courten, surname
