= Sir Edward Littleton, 1st Baronet =

Sir Edward Littleton Bt
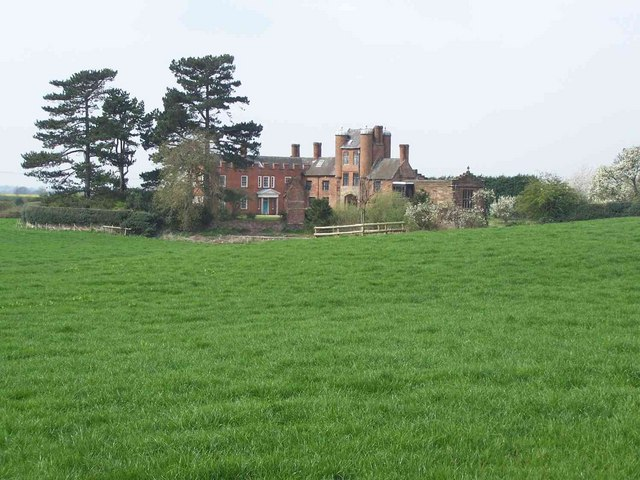
- Restored remains of Pillaton Hall today, incorporated into a more recent building.

Member of the English Parliament for Staffordshire
- In office 1640–1644 Serving with Sir William Bowyer, died March 1641; Sir Hervey Bagot, disabled 24 November 1642
- Preceded by: Sir Hervey Bagot; Thomas Crompton
- Succeeded by: Sir John Bowyer; Sir Richard Skeffington

Personal details
- Born: c. 1599
- Died: c. August 1657 Probably Romford
- Party: Country party or Parliamentarian until late 1643. Defected to Royalists.
- Spouse(s): Hester, daughter of Sir William Courten
- Relations: Robert Devereux, 3rd Earl of Essex; Richard Knightley
- Children: Sir Edward Littleton, 2nd Baronet, two other sons and two daughters.
- Education: Brasenose College, Oxford
- Occupation: Landowner

Sir Edward Littleton, 1st Baronet (c. 1599 – c. 1657) was a 17th-century English Baronet and politician from the extended Littleton/Lyttelton family, the first of a line of four Littleton baronets with Pillaton Hall as their seat. He initially joined the Parliamentarians during the English Civil War. Having tried unsuccessfully to find a third way, he switched his support to the Royalist cause – a decision that led to his financial ruin, as large debts made it impossible to redeem his estates from sequestration after the victory of Parliament.

== Background and education ==
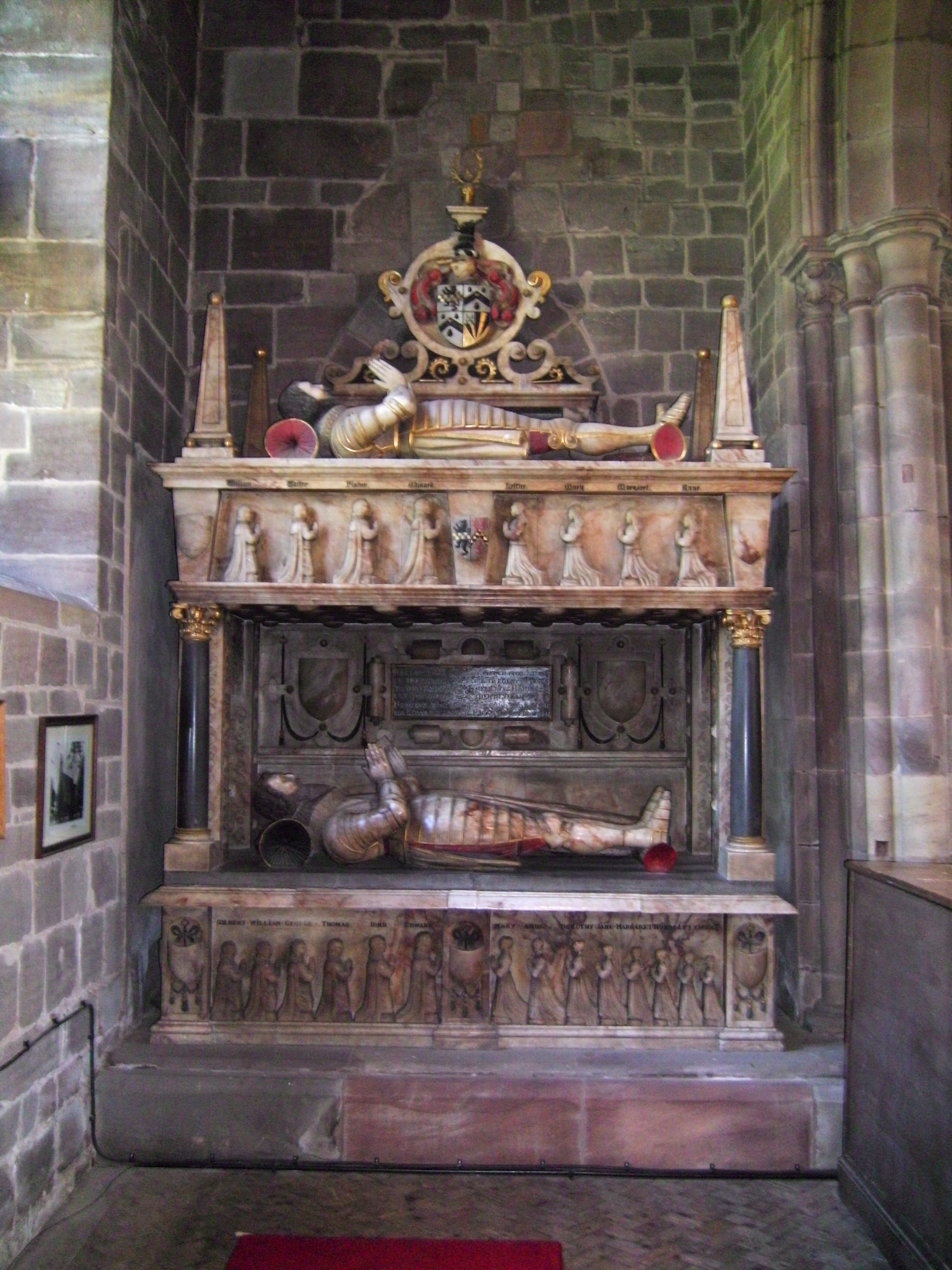
Tomb of two Sir Edwards Littleton, father and grandfather of the first baronet, at St Michael's Church Penkridge. Lower stage: Sir Edward Littleton (d. 1610) and his wife, Margaret Devereux. Upper stage: Sir Edward (d. 1629), and his wife, Mary Fisher.

Edward Littleton was born in 1599 or 1598: he was recorded as 18 years of age when he enrolled at Oxford University in 1617. He was the son of Sir Edward Littleton of Pillaton Hall, near Penkridge, Staffordshire and Mary Fisher, daughter of Clement Fisher of Packington, Warwickshire.

Both of Littleton's parents came from the middling landed gentry. His mother, Mary, was from the neighbouring county of Warwickshire, where the Fishers held the manor of Packington in chief and the advowson of the parish church. Clement, her father, had succeeded to his lands in 1571 and died on 23 October 1619, leaving as heir his son Sir Robert. His widow, also Mary, then occupied the manor house with her other daughter Anne Dilke, and then soon died, making it difficult for Sir Robert to get the will executed. In 1621 he accused his deceased mother and widowed sister of wasting timber on the estate and received letters of administration only in May 1623.

The Littletons of Staffordshire, Worcestershire and Shropshire were all alike descendants of Thomas de Littleton, an eminent 15th-century judge and jurist. Numerous surname variants were current in the 16th and 17th centuries: and the various branches of the family were not distinguished orthographically. The Staffordshire Littletons had often been turbulent, like their Worcestershire cousins. Edward Littleton's paternal grandfather had been a prominent supporter of Robert Devereux, 2nd Earl of Essex, marrying the earl's cousin, and had been arrested and temporarily disgraced as a suspected organiser of the Essex Rebellion. His father was suspected of Puritan sympathies and had supported a controversial minister at St Michael's Church in Penkridge, where the Littletons held the advowson. He too kept up the Devereux connection: Robert Devereux, 3rd Earl of Essex had a seat at nearby Chartley Castle and was a powerful ally, as well as a relative.

The young Edward was sent off to Brasenose College, Oxford, where he matriculated on 28 March 1617. His county was recorded as Warwickshire, which was his mother's native place. About three years earlier his father had run into financial difficulties in the wake of his term as Sheriff of the county and had moved his household to Worcester to economise. Young Edward was admitted to the Inner Temple little more than a year later, on 13 June 1618. His kinsmen the Shropshire Littletons were moving into a period of influence at the Inner Temple. His younger brother Walter, without prospects of inheritance, pursued an academic career and became a cleric.

It appears that the Littleton family returned to Pillaton soon after Edward's admission to the Inner Temple, perhaps during 1618, and their financial situation began to recover as a result of a switch to demesne farming and animal husbandry.

== Marriage and honours ==
A knighthood was purchased once Edward Littleton reached maturity, and he received it on 22 August 1621 at Warwick.

In 1625 he married Hester Courten or Courteen, daughter of Sir William Courten, an immensely wealthy London textile merchant and financier, originally from Menen in Flanders. Courten had lent £25,000 to the Crown. Keen to place his children advantageously, he paid a dowry of £5000 to the Littletons, who were only middling gentry. Courten married his other daughter Anne to Essex Devereux, a kinsman of the Earl of Essex, thus strengthening the Devereux/Littleton connection. After the untimely death of Essex Devereux, Anne was married to Edward Littleton's cousin and trustee, Richard Knightley.

It is likely that it was the huge dowry from Courten that made possible the purchase of a baronetcy for the younger Edward Littleton, which was conferred by Charles I on 28 June 1627.

== Ship money ==
After succeeding his father, Littleton began to play a full part in the political life of his county. He served as High Sheriff of Staffordshire in 1636 – 37. His shrievalty coincided with the ship money crisis and he seems to have held an ambivalent position, allowing many to escape without paying. On 12 February 1637 he wrote from Pillaton to Edward Nicholas, clerk to the Privy Council complaining that he had

found such refractoriness in most of the county, as well constables, assessors, and others, by reason of the £1,000 that is laid on the county more than the first time, that they say they will petition and not pay till they be answered. Should he bind them all up it would never be ended. He has been very rough with many, and now they begin a little to be reclaimed. Were he to suffer death for his neglect he were not able to do more. Cannot as yet get a quarter of the assessments to be signed, directing daily warrants out to the high constables for their answering their contempt at the Council table. As soon as he can force them he will return an account. Whole regiments come daily to his house saying, "Distrain !" for they have no money. Did Nicholas know the charge he is at, and the trouble, he would plead for the writer and the Lords compassionate him. He has received £650 and given order to his undersheriff, Mr. Richard, to pay in £1,000.

A month later he wrote again in a similar vein, pointing out that some had overpaid while the constable of Seisdon Hundred had neither paid in any money nor submitted any accounts. At some stage, presumably later in the year, Littleton was faced by a summons to the House of Lords over £300 arrears, against £2700 paid in, and petitioned for a stay until Easter 1638 to give him a chance to complete the collection. Although Littleton had sought to portray himself as zealous in collecting money for the king but frustrated by inefficient constables, Sir John Skeffington, his successor as sheriff, gave a very different picture in a letter to Nicholas from his Staffordshire home at Fisherwick.

Being at Skeffington in Leicestershire on receipt of the writs for ship-money, he has transplanted himself for the better performance of his duty, and having sought conference with the head constables and others, whether from jealousy that he would not give them the same connivance as his predecessors, whereby a great part of the collection is yet ungathered, or from what other reasons he cannot guess, he received from them directions which would have led him into error and there kept him if he had not redeemed himself.

Wedgwood thought this indicated that "Sir Edward was even then on the popular side." Blaming a predecessor seems a natural enough tactic and the two men were equally keen to cast as much as possible of the blame on subordinates. The latter tactic was at least partly successful. As late as 31 May 1640 the Privy Council was still pursuing the constables who had been cited as dishonest or slipshod by Littleton.

== Drift to conflict ==
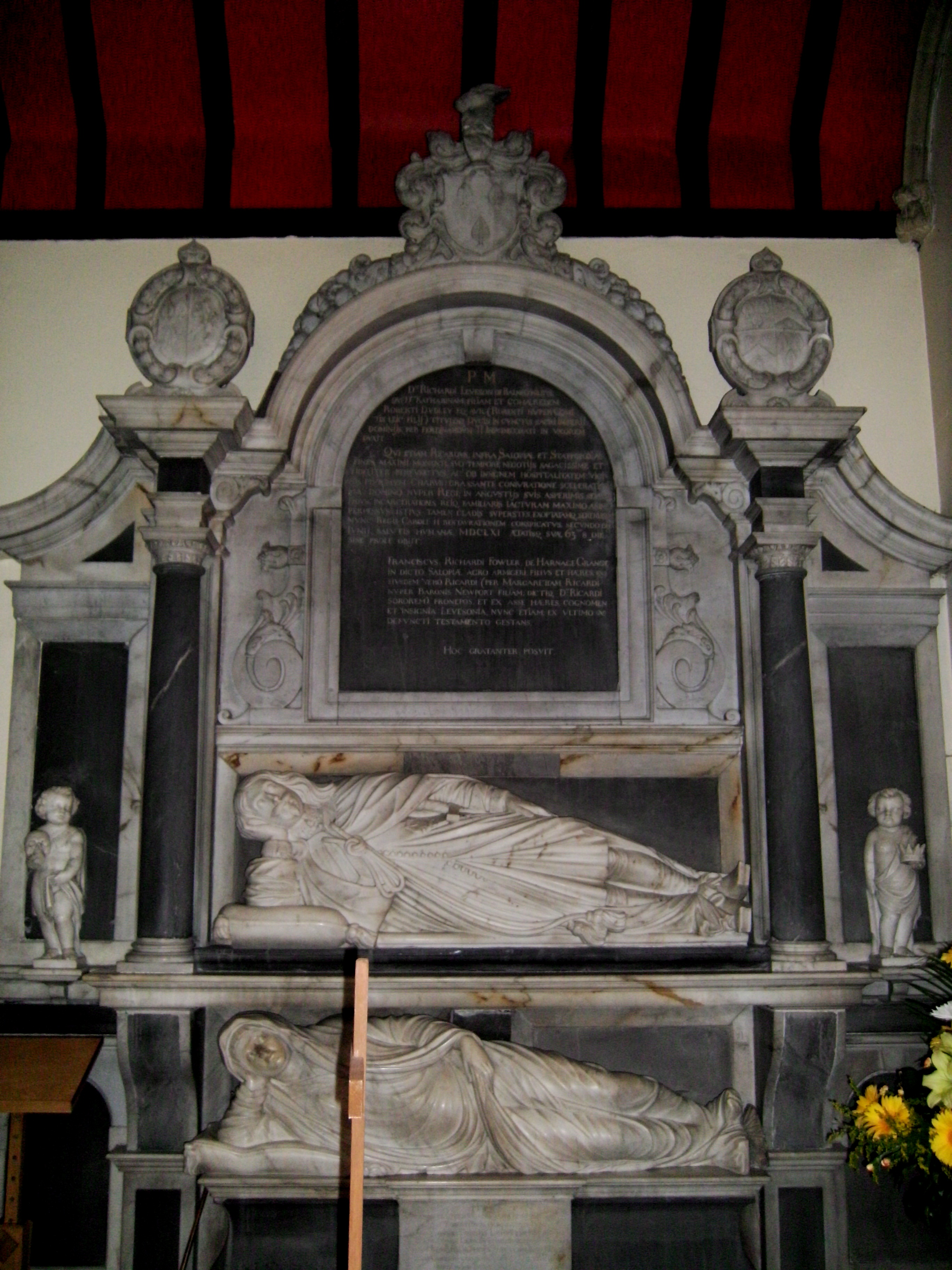
Memorial to Sir Richard Leveson (1598-1661) and his wife Katherine Dudley. St Michael's church, Lilleshall, Shropshire.

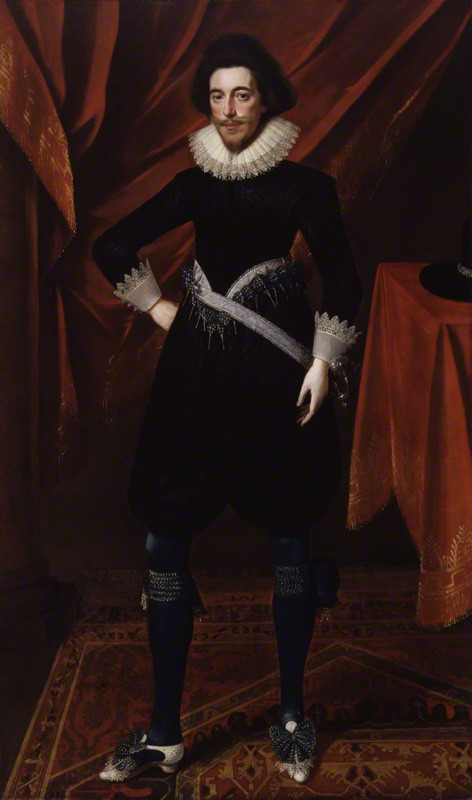
Robert Devereux, 3rd Earl of Essex, a kinsman and ally of Littleton.

Littleton was Member of Parliament for Staffordshire from 1640, in both the Short Parliament and the Long Parliament. Initially a trusted Parliamentarian, he was entrusted with his share of commissions and committees. On 26 March 1641, he was appointed to a committee on a bill described as being "to prevent Dangers, that may happen by Popish Recusants." Not surprisingly, in May he agreed to the terms of the Protestation that he would "promise, vow, and protest, to maintain and defend, as far as lawfully I may, with my Life, Power, and Estate, the true, reformed, Protestant Religion..." In August the MPs for various counties were commissioned to put into effect an act for the disarming of recusants, yet to be drawn up: Littleton and his friend Sir Richard Leveson received the commission as Staffordshire MPs.

As the country drifted toward war, Littleton remained a resolute Parliamentarian. On 6 June 1642 he wrote to Leveson, an MP for Newcastle-under-Lyme, pointing out that Parliament expected all members to be in attendance by 16 June, with a penalty of £100 for non-compliance – to be used in funding the war in Ireland. He then reported on the king's preparations for civil war, including his commissions to raise troops against Parliament in every county. Leveson failed to commit himself to Parliament and was summoned by the House of Commons in August. When the king's commission of array wrote urging him to mobilise on the royalist side he joined with other local gentry in signing a refusal "without supreme authority or greater motives of more demonstrable dangers to raise the armes of their county". Ultimately Leveson's neutralist policy failed in the face of the king's order to suppress all third Force troops, and he reluctantly took up the royalist cause. Littleton, on the other hand, did not vacillate but immediately rallied to Parliament. A week after he wrote to Leveson, he was back at Parliament, where he was ordered, along with two other MPs, to notify his father-in-law Courten that he must not sell or move his stocks of saltpetre, an essential component of gunpowder, which Parliament intended to buy from him. On 6 August the king, then at York, appointed Littleton Custos Rotulorum of Staffordshire, to replace Essex, who was Lord Lieutenant of the county and a leader of the opposition among the Lords. If this was intended to loosen the Devereux-Littleton connection, it failed.

== Parliament activity ==
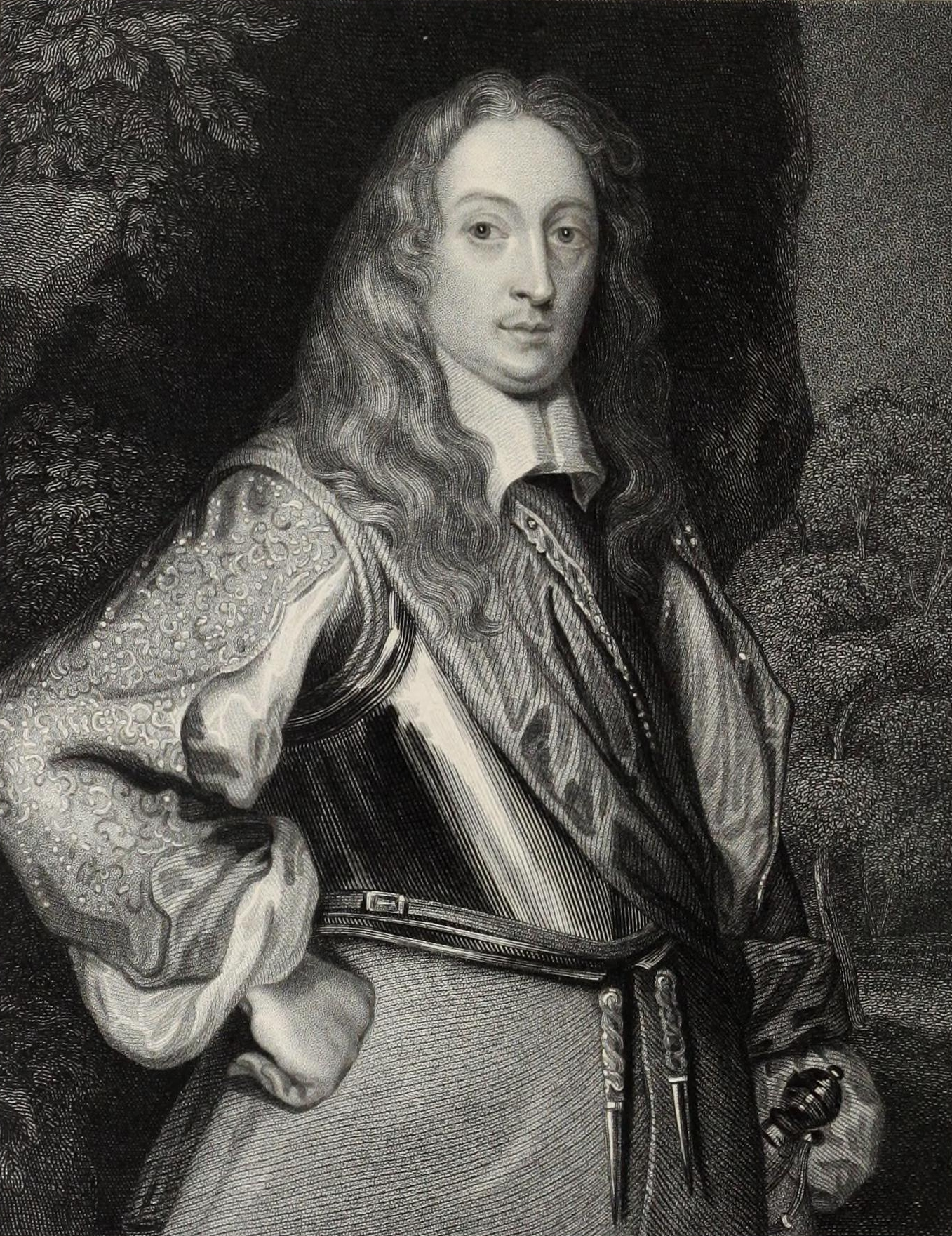
Lord Brooke, lord of Penkridge manor, from an engraving by William Henry Mote.

By February 1643 the royalists were dominant across most of Staffordshire. Parliament's counter-attack was launched under Robert Greville, 2nd Baron Brooke, lord of the manor of Penkridge, and as such a neighbour of Littleton, although he had substantial holdings around Warwick. Brooke took Stratford upon Avon and on 2 March, St Chad’s Day, invested the cathedral close at Lichfield, which had been fortified by the royalists. He was killed on the first day of the siege by a sniper but the garrison capitulated on 5 March. On 14 March the Commons considered a letter from the successful soldiers at Lichfield, which included a request for money and saddles. Littleton and another MP were ordered to write a letter of thanks from the House. Four days later the House committed to his care and that of a Lancashire MP some captured saddles, to be shared between troops in their respective counties.

On 27 March Littleton was commissioned, along with other MPs from his county, to enforce a law providing for the sequestration of the estates of "notorious delinquents," i.e. royalists. On 7 May he was similarly nominated to enforce an emergency financial measure, "An Ordinance for the speedy raising and levying of money thorowout the whole Kingdome of England, and dominion of Wales for the relief of the Common-wealth..." On 6 June he was listed among those MPs who took the Covenant, expressing their willingness to continue the war in defence of the Protestant faith. On 3 August he was nominated again in connection with another "Ordinance for the speedy Raising and Levying of Money." As late as 20 August he was appointed to the committee dealing with MPs who deserted Parliament.

== Defection ==
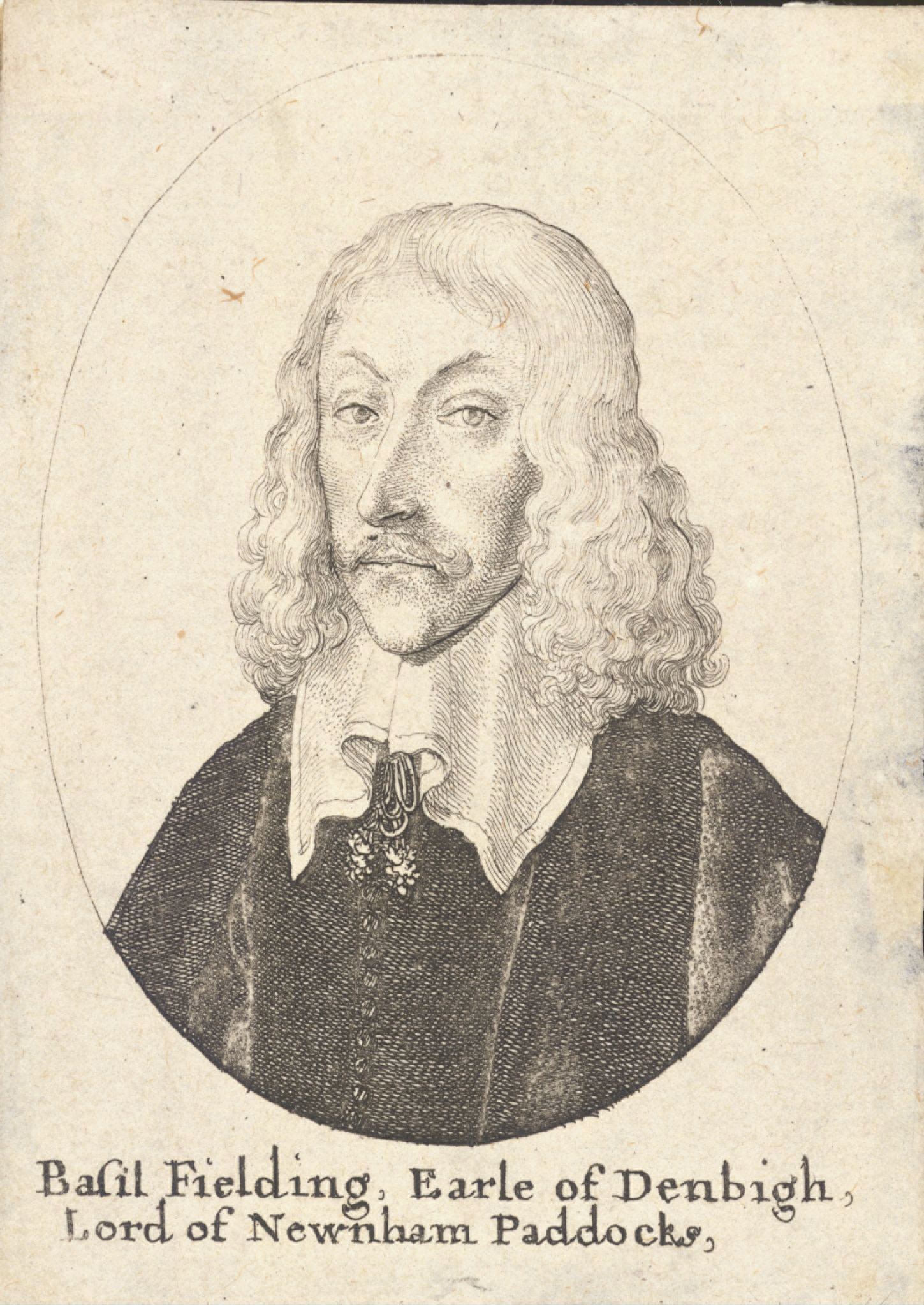
The 2nd Earl of Denbigh.

By 15 November 1643 Parliament was fruitlessly summoning Littleton back from leave of absence. By 2 December the tone had become insistent, as Parliament ordered: "That Sir Edw. Littleton be summoned to attend the Service of the House forthwith." In January 1644 he joined the Oxford Parliament and on 4 March was disabled from attending Westminster, together with Sir John Borlase, 1st Baronet, "for neglecting the Service of the House, and going to the other Party." On 31 July 1646 the writ was moved for by-elections to replace Littleton and Sir Hervey Bagot, a committed royalist disabled as early as 24 November 1642, as Staffordshire MPs.

Some details of Littleton's defection came to light in December 1649, during an investigation into allegations that Basil Feilding, 2nd Earl of Denbigh, the Parliamentarian commander in the Midlands at the time, had been implicated in moves to create a third force or a large scale defection to the king. These grew out of a long feud between Denbigh and the Shropshire parliamentary committee, whose leader Humphrey Mackworth, had discovered Denbigh was in contact with a royalist agent in December 1643. This came to light through the investigations of John Swinfen, a Staffordshire Presbyterian who later represented Stafford in the Long Parliament, and a Captain Stone. Denbigh himself admitted to Mackworth that a Captain Gower, who had travelled widely with him, had been encouraging him to go over to the king and that his defection would be accompanied by a royalist rising in Huntingdonshire. Littleton had announced in Staffordshire that he was raising forces on Denbigh's behalf, apparently in order to launch a third party, with the help of Sir Walter Wrottesley and Gerard Scrimshaw of Aqualate Hall. Swinfen, a member of the Staffordshire parliamentary committee, had warned that Littleton had made his peace with the king, precipitating his flight to Oxford. Correspondence between Littleton and Denbigh was said to cast serious suspicion on the Earl, who nevertheless survived this investigation, as several others, and never actually deserted Parliament.

Isolated from his Staffordshire base, Littleton was impotent to contribute to the royalist cause in the area, and parliamentary soldiers occupied Penkridge in 1645 after the briefest of skirmishes. He served to the bitter end of hostilities in the Midlands: the siege of Worcester, which began on 21 May 1646 and ended on 23 July. Littleton heads the list of knights present in the garrison at the end of the siege.

== Sequestration ==
Littleton's estates were subject to sequestration and forfeiture. As early as 25 June 1646, even before he surrendered at Worcester, Parliament granted one of his small estates, Little Saredon, to a local minister. He was listed as a delinquent in a report from the Staffordshire sequestrations solicitors to the Committee for Compounding with Delinquents in March 1648. The complexity of some of the financial transactions in which he was involved, mainly through the dealings of the Courtens, gradually became apparent. Littleton applied to compound but this was impossible because of the complications caused by his own personal debt of £3000 and the surety for the vast sum of £50,000 he had stood for his father-in-law and brother-in-law. This he noted in an application he made on 11 June 1649 to avoid any accusation of contempt for not compounding by the due date. The committee accepted his explanation but he remained unable to compound because of his debts.

Cokayne probably depending on Kimber and Johnson, asserts that Littleton ultimately compounded for his estates and gives the fine as £1347 6s. 8d. Wedgwood thought that "on 10 December 1649 he had been fined £1134, and sequestration had been suspended on payment of half." This seems to be a misreading of Mary Anne Everett Green’s calendar of the committee proceedings, which show this as the sum demanded of Sir Edward's brother, Fisher, on 10 December 1650 to redeem parts of the estate he was then claiming. Sir Edward's failure to compound is asserted by the History of Parliament in a biography of his son and successor, which cites Green's calendar as evidence.

Various creditors had claimed parts of his estates but on 13 June 1650 tenants were ordered not to pay any rent to extenders, i.e. temporary exploiters, of his estates but to pay it directly to the local sequestrations committee at Stafford. On 1 August 1650 the Commons passed an act that allowed creditors and mortgagees to pay a portion of the delinquent's fine relating to the lands they claimed and thus gain possession. By the end of the month there was a series of applications to consider from people with claims on the estates to compound for their portions. One of these was Anne Gates, widow of Thomas Gates, a Parliamentarian and Baron of the Exchequer, who had died as recently as 19 August, and who had been renting half of Littleton's Worcestershire estates from the sequestrator. Then came Francis Neville, also renting Worcestershire estates, who was owed £800 by Littleton but had so far made only £80 toward clearing the debt. Sir William Hicks claimed that he had received only £800 toward a debt of £1800, outstanding since 1643. These made progress toward their desired goals at varying rates over the next two years. Fisher Littleton, Sir Edward's brother and trustee, sought to rescue some parts of the estates by buying them back for the family, claiming that he was one of Sir Edward's major creditors, with a judgement against him amounting to £1600, dating back to 1643. Fisher had been renting a large portfolio of his brother's land, half of all his Staffordshire estates, since 1646 for £100 a year, although it was worth £245. On 10 December 1650 the committee offered him the land for a fine of £1134, with half to be paid immediately and the rest within six weeks. Within two days Fisher had deposited the first instalment and provided security for the remainder, so the sequestration on this land was suspended.

On 1 October 1650 the Commons debated a resolution from the army committee intended to expedite cases where landowners had tried to conceal the extent and value of their holdings. It was proposed that they might own up and save these lands, although they would be expected to pay a sixth, rather than a tenth, for them. The resolution was passed the following day and the Littletons sought to take advantage of it. This was one of a number of cases where a "discoverer" or informer had already sought to reveal the facts and make a profit by so doing. One Humphrey Lewis protested that he had reported a subterfuge by which Sir William Hicks and Fisher Littleton sought to protect some of Sir Edward's land by making false claims to it. As Lewis had done this in April 1650, he contended that he was the first discoverer and a subsequent admission by Fisher Littleton did not count. The Staffordshire parliamentary committee issued a certificate recognising Lewis's claim in December 1650 but the Committee for Compounding did not consider the matter until 17 March 1652. Two days later it accepted Lewis's claim, awarding him a fifth of the profits from the estate. Meanwhile, other creditors were pushing forward their claims. In May 1652 Thomas Kempson sought confirmation of his tenancy of the tithes of Great Saredon, which Littleton had transferred to him in settlement of a debt. In this case, the county committee frustrated his efforts.

In November 1652 the Commons debated a bill authorising the sale of the remaining lands of delinquents with the aim of paying off their debts. Littleton petitioned for his name to be included and the House agreed. He was duly included in the resulting act. Fisher Littleton continued to buy back the family estates and agitated for the more rapid release of land for this purpose: on 30 June 1653 the Council of State referred to the committee a petition on this subject he had submitted. The following month Littleton's trustees, his cousin Richard Knightley and nephew Richard Salwey, were able to get the lordship of Shelsley Walsh in Worcestershire released from sequestration. They seem to have transferred it soon to Sir Edward, as he, his wife and his heir sold to Thomas Foley in 1654. The indefatigable Fisher Littleton had, in September 1653, recovered a number of Staffordshire estates, including the lands of the former Penkridge College.

== Death ==
Littleton is thought to have been buried at St Edward the Confessor Church, Romford on 3 August 1657.

== Family ==
As noted above, Sir Edward Littleton married Hester Courten, daughter of a rich merchant and financier. They had three sons of whom two, James and William, died sine prole. Sir Edward's surviving son and successor was Sir Edward Littleton, 2nd Baronet. There were also two daughters, Anne, the second wife of Sir Thomas Holte, who remarried Charles Leigh after Holte's death, and Margaret.

== Footnotes ==
Parliament of England
Preceded by Sir Hervey Bagot; Thomas Crompton	Member of Parliament for Staffordshire; 1640–1644; With: Sir William Bowyer, died March 1641; Sir Hervey Bagot, disabled 24 November 1642	Succeeded by Sir John Bowyer; Sir Richard Skeffington
Baronetage of England
New creation	Baronet (of Pillaton Hall); 1627 – c. 1657	Succeeded by Edward Littleton
