= Edward Littleton (died 1629) =

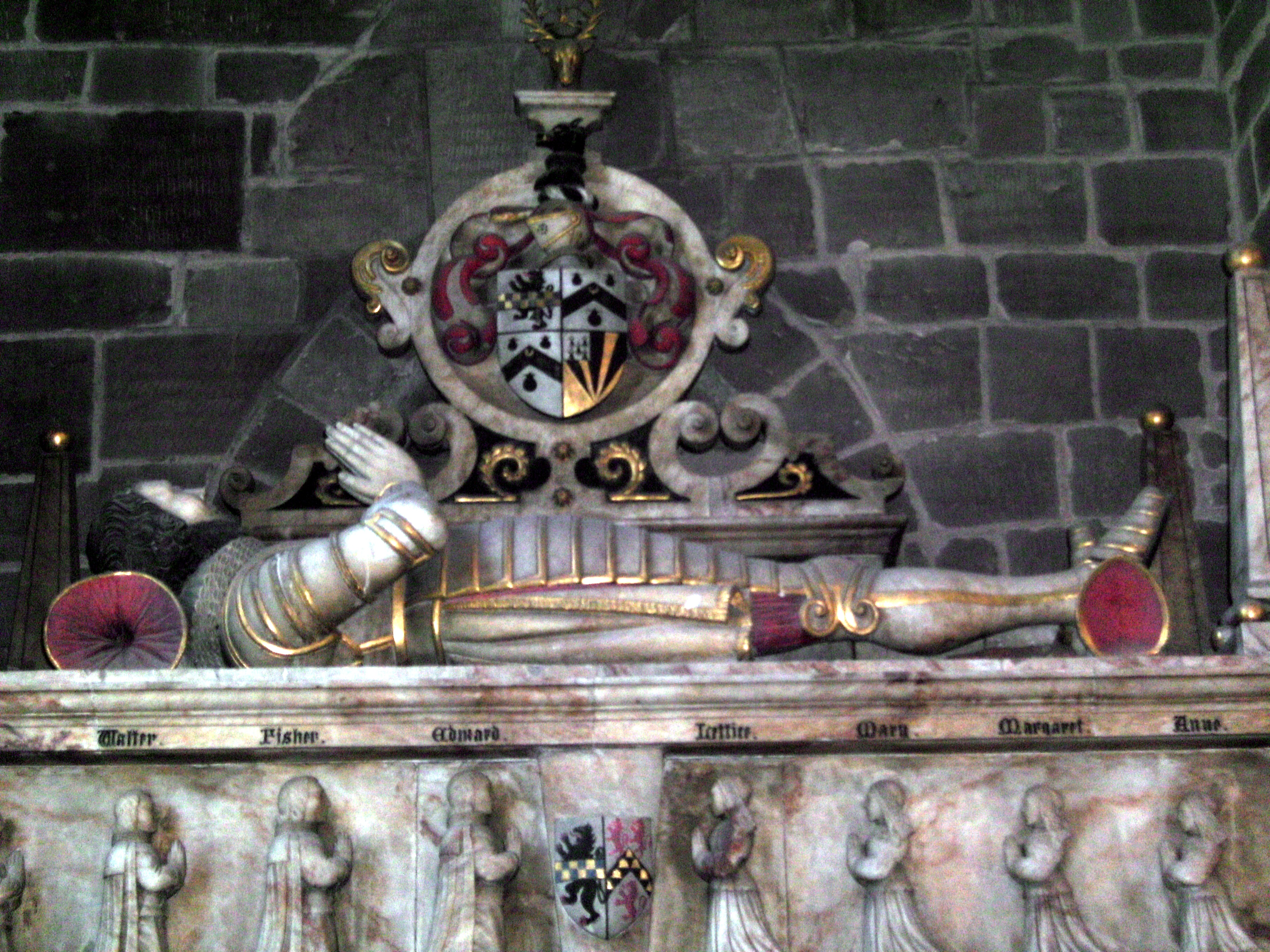
Effigy of Sir Edward Littleton (died 1629): part of a double monument in the north nave aisle of St Michael's church, Penkridge, Staffordshire.

Sir Edward Littleton (c. 1577 – 25 July 1629) was a politician from the extended Littleton/Lyttelton family and an important Staffordshire landowner of the Jacobean era and the early Caroline era. Although loyal to the monarchy, he seems to have been of Puritan sympathies and was a close ally of Robert Devereux, 3rd Earl of Essex. He represented Staffordshire in the English parliament of 1624.

== Background ==
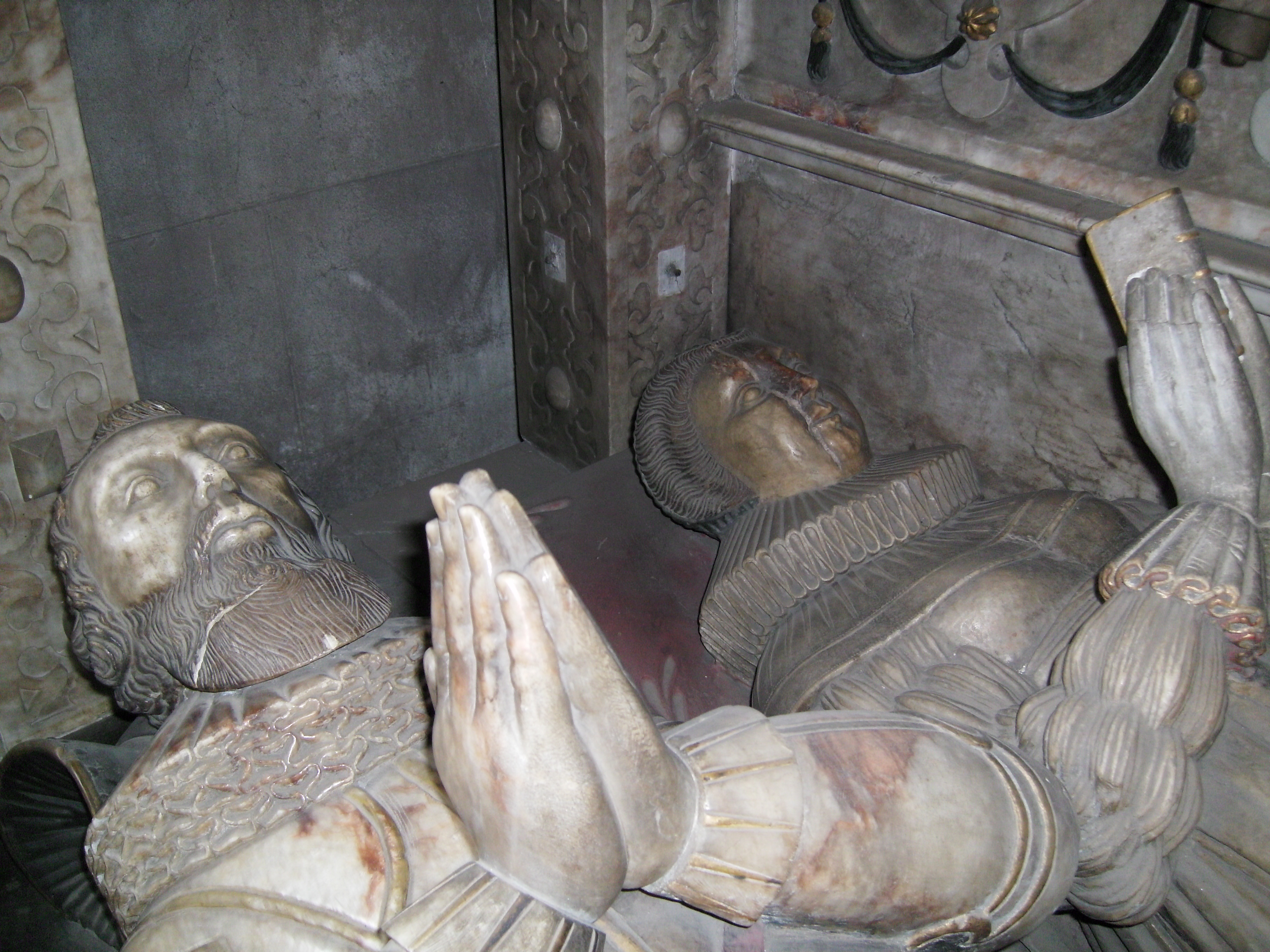
Littleton's mother and father: the elder Sir Edward Littleton and Margaret Devereux.

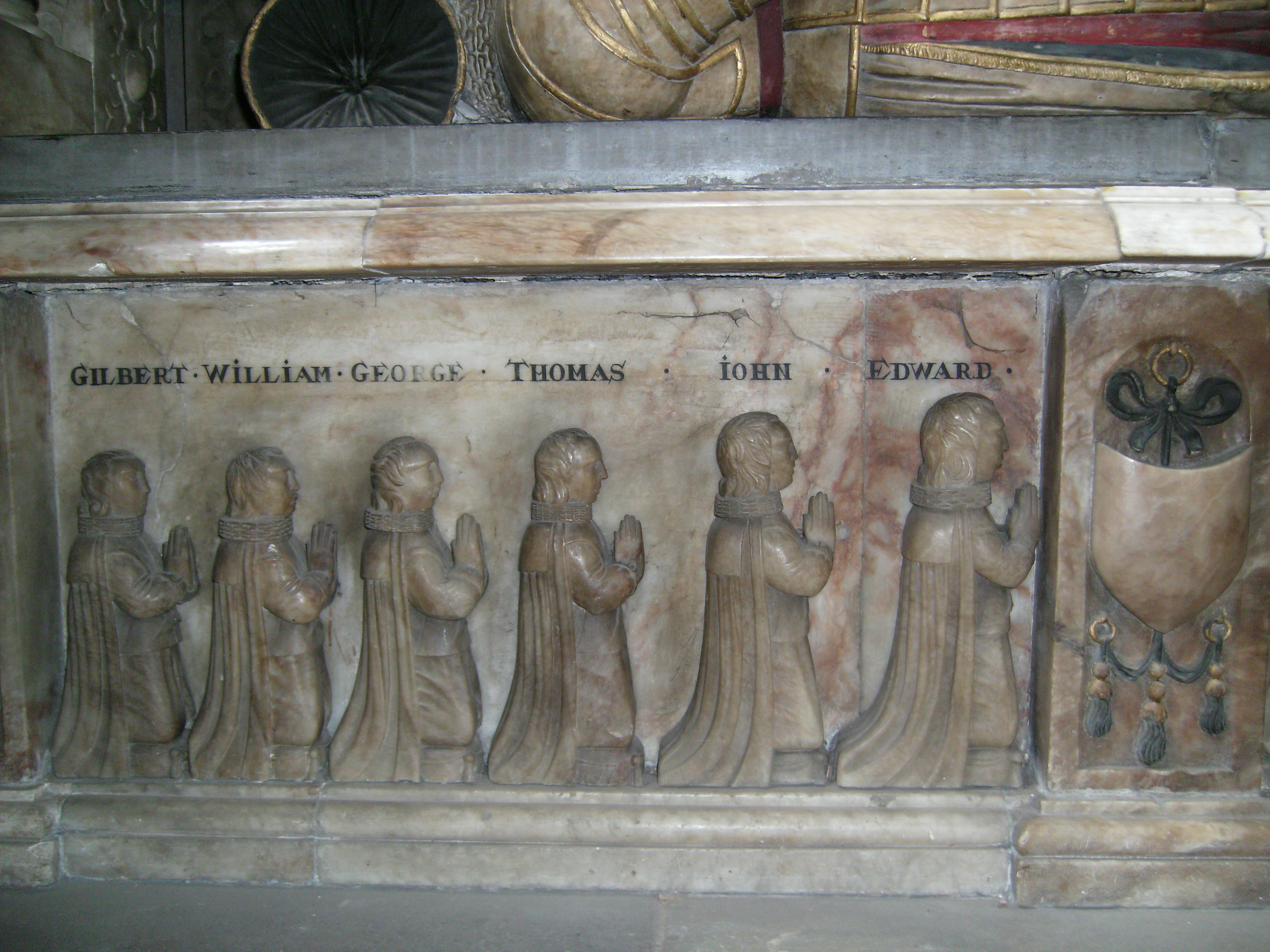
Sons of Sir Edward Littleton and Margaret Devereux, from the double tomb in St. Michael's church, Penkridge. The younger Edward Littleton is pictured at the head of his brothers.

Littleton's parents were Sir Edward Littleton (died 1610) of Pillaton Hall, near Penkridge, Staffordshire, and Margaret Devereux, the daughter of Sir William Devereux of Merevale Hall, Warwickshire .

The elder Sir Edward Littleton was an important and politically active member of the Staffordshire landed gentry. He was a partisan of Robert Devereux, 2nd Earl of Essex in the turbulent final decade of Elizabeth I. Margaret Devereux was Essex's first cousin, once removed. Sir Edward was the earl's agent in his home county of Staffordshire and played a part – tangential, he claimed – in the Essex Rebellion of 1601. He was lucky to escape with his life but his fortunes recovered quickly, especially after the accession of James I. He represented his county in Parliament from 1604 until a month before his death.

== Early life and education ==
Littleton was admitted to Balliol College, Oxford in 1594, aged 17 – evidence for his birth date. He left after a year for a year of legal training – a common practice in the period, when the Inns of Court were often used as finishing schools for the landed gentry – at the Inner Temple, his father's Inn of Court. He was admitted on 23 November 1595, free of charge, on the orders of the parliament of that year, at the instance of Thomas Coventree, Autumn Reader for 1594. This Thomas Coventry was an important judge, father of Thomas Coventry, 1st Baron Coventry, and an ally of Edward Coke, the leading jurist of his day and another Inner Temple man. These connections with some of the key figures in the Elizabethan state can only have helped when the elder Littleton was embroiled in the Essex rebellion, as Coke was one of those who conducted his interrogation.

Littleton married Mary Fisher, the daughter of a Warwickshire landowner: the marriage settlement is dated 15 January 1599. At his marriage, Littleton was granted an annual allowance of £100 by his father. Two years later, faced by a large fine because of his association with Essex, the elder Littleton protested to Cecil that:

“My living is divided into three parts, of which my mother has one, my brethren and sisters another, and the third, which amounteth not to two hundred pounds per annum, must suffice for the maintenance of myself and thirteen children.”

This was special pleading, designed to get easy terms, but his son's allowance was certainly a substantial sum for him to find.

On his accession, James I distributed honours widely. The younger Littleton received his knighthood on 23 April 1603, while the king was still making his way from Scotland to the capital. He was made a justice of the peace for Staffordshire in 1605 – both signal honours for a man who was not yet in possession of his family's fortune. However, that came about fairly soon, with his father's death on 17 December 1610.

== Landowner ==
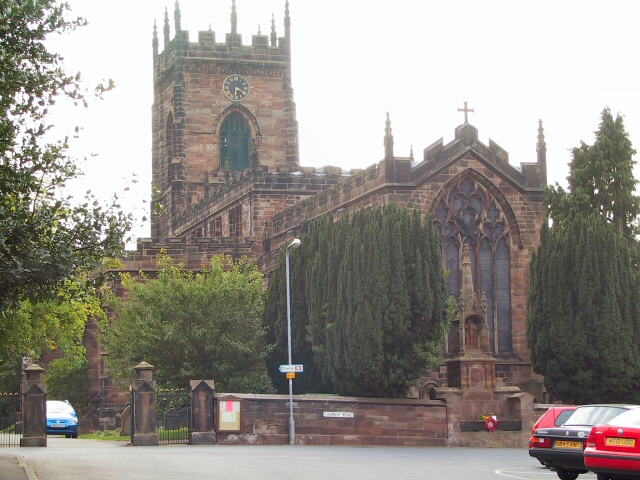
Penkridge parish church today. Littleton bought its property outright, acquiring numerous rights of the former royal peculiar.

The Littletons had been based at Pillaton since the early years of the 16th century. They were one of the gentry families that profited greatly from the English Reformation and their most important estates were former ecclesiastical property – especially that of the Collegiate church of St Michael and All Angels at Penkridge. When the elder Sir Edward Littleton succeeded to the family estates in 1574, they comprised a swathe of lands across the Midlands: some 6,000 acres in the Penkridge area and another 600 elsewhere in Staffordshire, 1,400 acres in Warwickshire, 900 acres in Shropshire and 940 acres in Worcestershire. These he consolidated by purchasing the deanery manor at Penkridge, formerly held on an 80-year lease, and regaining possession of the family holdings in Teddesley Hay, north east of Penkridge. The younger Edward thus inherited a very large, potentially profitable, portfolio of property.

However, there were many calls on his resources and his financial situation was essentially similar to his father's. Again the estates had to support a vigorous and well-connected widow, as Margaret Devereux long outlived her husband, surviving until 23 January 1627. Mary Fisher bore eight children, four of each sex, and there were many more distant relatives with allowances. It seems also that Littleton himself was a generous host and kept a “bountiful and liberal house.” He was also honoured, but perhaps unfortunate, to be pricked High Sheriff of Staffordshire soon after succeeding to his estates, in 1613. He was forced, therefore, probably in 1614, when his shrievalty ended, to transfer his household from Pillaton to Worcester to reduce his expenses. His finances did recover, although there were complaints about the depredations of his large flocks of sheep, so it is likely that part of his recovery plan was more efficient exploitation of his own demesne lands.

He had lost his place as a justice of the peace, as this post could not be held simultaneously with that of sheriff. The move to Worcester might have threatened his future as a magistrate, but he was reappointed in Michaelmas 1615 and became active again as a justice from 1618, which may be when he returned to Pillaton.

Littleton now became closely involved in a long-running dispute between the minister of Penkridge and his parishioners. John Bowen was installed by Littleton in 1617. The Littletons held advowson, the right to present clergy to St Michaels, a source of considerable power and profit. However, their relationship to the church was more than the normal one of lay patronage. As proprietor of the deanery manor of Penkridge, Littleton was chief officer of the royal peculiar, the ecclesiastical institution – independent of the diocese of Lichfield – that survived when the College of St Michael was abolished in 1547 until 1858. This carried more power, but also more responsibility and potential for embarrassment.

Bowen created considerable enmity and numerous complaints were made by the parishioners of Penkridge. He was accused of nonconformity, which suggests that he was a Puritan, although he was also accused of fathering an illegitimate child. The case went to the Court of High Commission, the supreme judicial authority within the Church of England, which dismissed it. However, Littleton's vigorous defence of Bowen landed him in the Star Chamber. There he was forced to admit that he not properly investigated some of the allegations against Bowen, including that he had denounced the Book of Sports. Issued in 1617, this had been designed to draw a line between Puritans and religious conservatives, as it specifically permitted a number of traditional religious practices deemed pagan by radical Protestants. That Bowen was opposed, or said to be opposed, to it tends to confirm that he was considered a Puritan. Under the Stuarts, official policy was moving towards a High Church perspective.

However, Littleton seems to have been considered basically loyal. He was regularly called on to perform the offices commensurate with his status as a leading member of the county gentry. For example, he was a commissioner for the subsidy, administering royal taxation, in 1611, 1621–2, 1624, 1625 and 1628. He became captain in the horse militia. He administered the Oath of Supremacy to justices. He was even commissioner for swans in the Midland counties in 1627.

== Parliamentary career ==
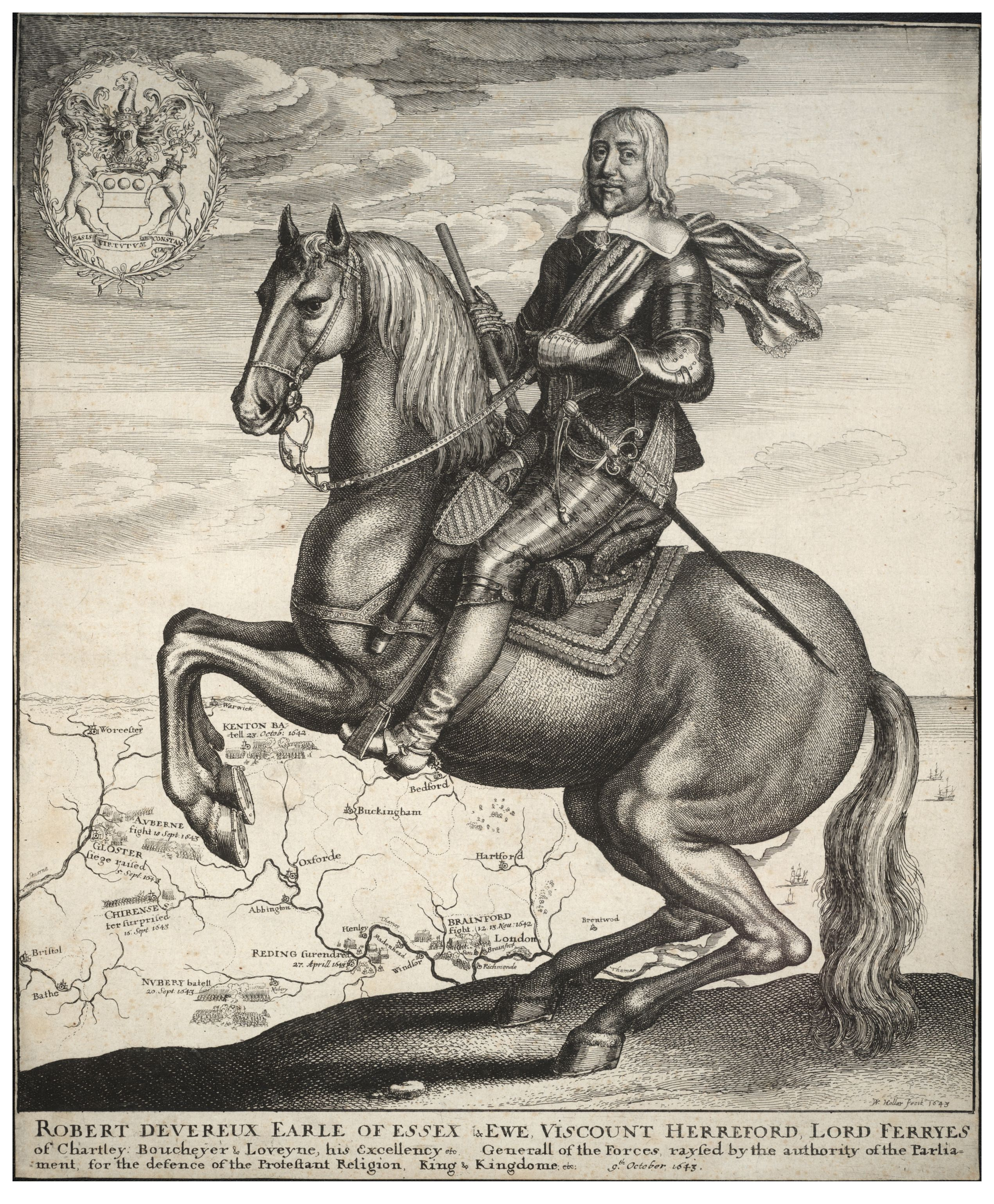
Robert Devereux, 3rd Earl of Essex, Littleton's cousin, neighbour and kinsman, pictured later in life as a parliamentary commander.

Littleton was elected knight of the shire for Staffordshire in 1624. He was a close ally of Robert Devereux, 3rd Earl of Essex, just as his father had been of the 2nd earl some three decades earlier. Essex was a cousin, as well as his ally. He had a Staffordshire seat at Chartley Castle, between Stafford and Uttoxeter. It was Essex, as Lord Lieutenant of Staffordshire, who secured Littleton's appointment as captain of the horse militia. Littleton was returned second in order of precedence to William Bowyer – an anomaly, since Bowyer was considerably below Littleton in the county hierarchy. Bowyer seems to have been a compromise candidate – unconnected to any major faction in the county and elected a total of five times between 1621 and 1640 – although he too was probably a moderate Puritan, like Littleton.

Littleton represented his county in what became known, sarcastically, as the Happy Parliament, following a coinage of Sir Edward Coke. It was the last of James's reign. Littleton's main contributions to the parliament were made through his work on three committees., dealing with

- The Somervile estate. The Parliament was presented with "An Act for Settling and Establishing of the Inheritance of Sir Will, Somervile, Knight, deceased." This stemmed from the case of John Somervile, a Catholic landowner from Warwickshire, who had set off for London in 1583, openly threatening to kill the queen, and had attacked some bystanders with his sword. Apprehended, he incriminated others and was condemned to death, but was found dead in his cell. His Protestant daughters and his brother, Sir William Somerville, were able to recover parts of his estates, but his son, also Sir William, was now seeking a final settlement. Apparently, the issue threatened to lead to intimidation and violence, as the House was soon demanding the presence of "the Party that gave Warning to Sir Will. Somervile's Brothers to be here To-morrow Morning, to acquaint the House with the Manner of it."

- The Egerton affair. This involved the important Staffordshire estate of Wrinehill, acquired by the prominent MP Sir John Egerton (died 1614) from his improvident cousin, Edward Egerton, but now the centre of a complex property dispute because of Sir John's disputed will. By this stage, Edward had gone so far as to introduce a bill to have the estate returned to him by John's son, Roland Egerton, who defended his own interests by getting himself elected to the parliament of 1624. The case proved almost intractable, although Sir Roland's family was ultimately to keep the estate.

- The naturalisation of three Scotsmen.

On 27 April Littleton he named Sir William Powell, a Staffordshire magistrate, as a recusant officeholder. This was the extent of his activity in what was a short-lived parliament. Although a partisan of Essex, a politician with a national profile, Littleton was thus confined almost entirely to matters of a regional importance, in which he probably had considerable knowledge and expertise.

It is possible that he considered contesting the 1628 election at Stafford, as the mayor and aldermen wrote to "Sir Edward Littleton" about the election. However, the contents of the letter are unknown, and the addressee might easily have been his son. He never again sat in parliament.

== Later years and death ==
In 1625 Littleton's eldest son and heir, also Edward, married Hester Courten, daughter of Sir William Courten, an immensely wealthy London textile merchant and financier, originally from Menen in Flanders. Courten had been immensely generous to the Crown, always desperate for money, but was still only a tradesman. It was some measure of Courten's desire to see his children accepted in English society that he parted with a huge dowry, some £5,000, to the Littletons, still gentry of merely regional importance. It is likely that this made possible the purchase of a baronetcy for the younger Edward Littleton in 1627. Charles I, even more rapacious for money than his father, was selling large numbers of baronetcies through favoured courtiers. There were to be four Littleton Baronets of Pillaton, the title lapsing in 1812.

By this time, the king's need for money had led to deadlock with both Houses of Parliament and a political crisis that was to become systemic. Charles imposed a forced loan on the country arbitrarily. Essex was one of the leaders of the opposition to this measure. He was stripped of his offices and in July 1627 Littleton was appointed Custos Rotulorum of Staffordshire, the county's senior administrative post, in place of the earl. He relinquished the post voluntarily when Essex was restored to his other offices in December 1628. Meanwhile, Littleton was also appointed commissioner for the forced loan in Staffordshire.

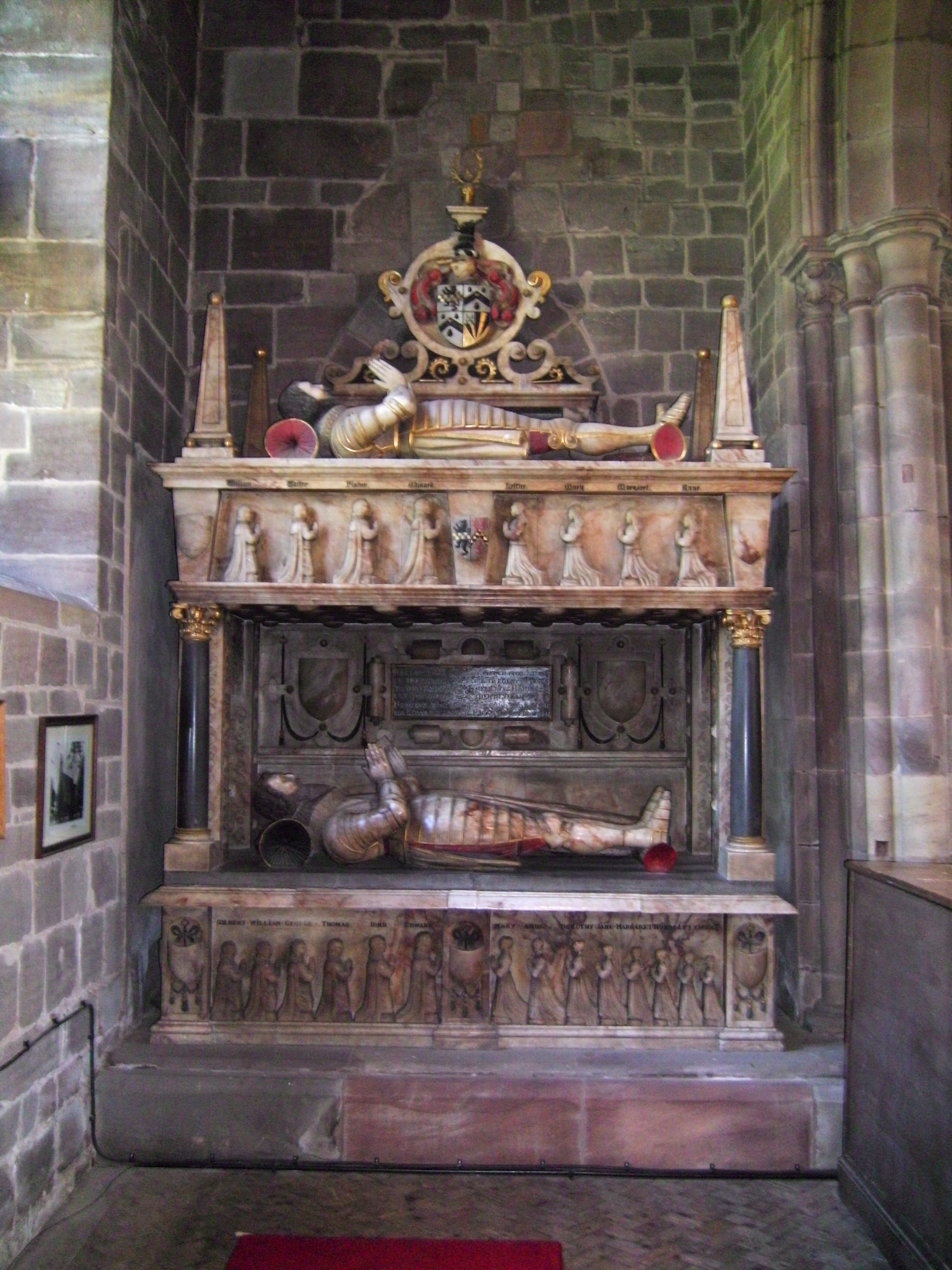
Tomb of two Sir Edward Littletons, father and son. East wall of north chancel aisle. Lower stage: Sir Edward Littleton (died 1610) and his wife, Margaret Devereux. Upper stage: Sir Edward (died 1629), and his wife, Mary Fisher. Their son, also Sir Edward, became the first baronet in 1627.

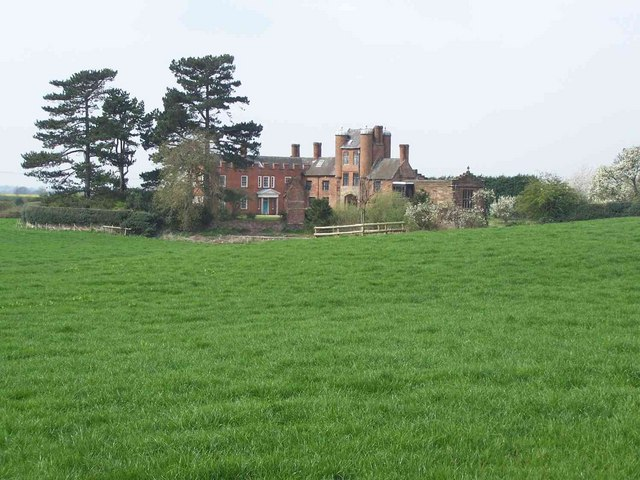
Remains of Pillaton Old Hall, east of Penkridge, seat of the Littleton family until the mid-18th century.

Littleton died on 25 July 1629 at Pillaton Hall, his Staffordshire home. He was buried the next day in St Michael's church, Penkridge. In his will, dated 1 June 1629, he left his wife 200 sheep, as well as cattle and agricultural equipment. He left instructions that a monument be erected to himself, his wife, his father and mother. This was duly completed by his son, the 1st baronet. an impressive two-tiered structure, it features effigies of Littleton and Mary Fisher on the upper tier, with his parents below. It was installed against the north wall of the chancel, but has since been relocated to the east wall.

== Marriage and family ==
Edward Littleton married Mary Fisher. She was the daughter of a Warwickshire landowner, Clement Fisher of Packington and Mary Repington, daughter of Sir Francis Repington, also of Warwickshire gentry background. The Fishers, like the Littleton's, had risen in the world by acquiring ecclesiastical lands (mainly those of Kenilworth priory) and allying themselves to the most important local magnate (in their case, Ambrose Dudley, 3rd Earl of Warwick), so the couple were well-matched socially and politically. Fisher was used for several generations by the Littletons as a name for younger sons.

They had four sons and four daughters.

- Sir Edward Littleton, 1st Baronet, married Hester Courten. They were the ancestors of the further three Littleton baronets of Pillaton and of the Barons Hatherton

- Fisher Littleton married Anne Baynton of Wiltshire.

- Sir Walter Littleton married Priscilla Pemberton of Rushden, Northamptonshire.

- William Littleton married the daughter, name unknown, of John Webster, a resident of Amsterdam in the Netherlands.

- Lettice Littleton married in turn two Worcestershire landowners: William Washbourne of Washbourne and John Clent of Knightwick.

- Mary Littleton married Euseby Shuckburgh of Naseby, Northamptonshire.

- Margaret Littleton married in turn two Warwickshire knights: Sir George Browne of Radford Semele and Sir Francis Fisher of Packington, her cousin.

- Anne Littleton married Sir Thomas Holte of Aston Hall.

== See also ==
- History of Penkridge
- Littleton Baronets
