= Philip Draycott =

Sir Philip Draycott (by 1483–1559), of Paynsley in Draycott, Staffordshire, and Smithfield, Middlesex, was an English Member of Parliament (MP).

He was a Member of the Parliament of England for Staffordshire in 1542, April 1554 and November 1554, and for Lichfield in October 1553.
