= John Swynnerton (MP for Staffordshire) =

English politician

John Swynnerton (c. 1349 – c. 1427) was an English politician.

He was the son and heir of Sir John Swynnerton of Hilton, Staffordshire and his wife Christine and succeeded his father in 1379.

He was hereditary steward of the forest of Cannock, Staffordshire from 1380 to his death. He was appointed High Sheriff of Staffordshire for 1391–1392 and Escheator for Staffordshire for 1401–1402.

He was elected MP for Staffordshire in 1402.

He married Clemency and had five sons. He was succeeded by his grandson John.
