= John Meverel =

English politician (died 1444)

John Meverel (died 1 May 1444) was an English politician. He sat as MP for Staffordshire in April 1414 and November 1414.

== Family and education ==
He was probably the son and heir of John Meverel (died 1399/1400) and his wife Margaret. His father was murdered shortly after the accession of Henry IV.

He married and had two sons and two daughters.

== Political career ==
In 1406, legal proceedings began against Meverel for involvement in a poaching raid with John de la Pole but he avoided punishment. Circa. 1409, he began recruiting supporters in a local feud. In March 1411, he received a royal pardon for earlier offences.

He sat in Parliament as MP for Staffordshire in April 1414 and November 1414. In December 1414, he received a second royal pardon. By 1419, his stepfather Henry Delves died. From 1419 till 1423, he engaged in multiple lawsuits over debts of around £52. In November 1420, he was listed among those fit for national defence in the wars with France. In November 1421, he was bound over £100 to appear before the royal council (likely for arranging an unauthorized marriage). He was pardoned in June 1422.

In May 1434, he swore an oath not to support those disturbing the peace. In 1437, he was pardoned for outlawry after harbouring a convicted robber.

== Death ==
He died on 1 May 1444 and was succeeded by his son Sir Sampson Meverel.
