= John Huddleston =

English Catholic priest (1608–1698)

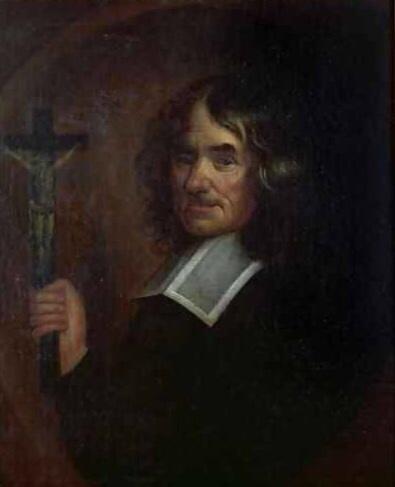
Father John Huddleston, after a portrait by Jacob Huysmans

John Huddleston (15 April 1608 – buried 13 September 1698) was an English priest and monk of the Catholic Order of St Benedict. He helped Charles II during his escape. Later, Huddleston was chaplain to Queen Catherine and present when Charles converted to Catholicism on his deathbed.

== Early life and education ==
John Huddleston was born at Farington Hall, Lancashire, the second son of Joseph Huddleston from Hutton John, near Penrith in Cumberland. His uncle, Richard Huddleston, was a Benedictine priest. John was educated at the school at nearby Great Blencow until he was fifteen. When he was twenty he was sent to St Omer College, and on 17 October 1632, entered the English College, Rome. On 22 March 1637, Huddleston was ordained priest in St John Lateran, and left Rome for England on 28 March 1639.

== Chaplain to Thomas Whitgrave ==
In 1651 he was staying at Moseley Old Hall, Staffordshire, as chaplain to Thomas Whitgrave's family, prominent local Catholics. After the defeat at the Battle of Worcester on 3 September 1651, Charles II, made King of Scotland following his father's execution, was conducted by Colonel Gifford to White Ladies Priory on Gifford's Boscobel estate. At White Ladies, the young King was sheltered by the five Penderell brothers who lived there. John Penderell happened to meet Father Huddleston, who suggested that the young King should go to Moseley Old Hall on the night of 7 September. Huddleston cleaned and bandaged the King's sore feet. To guard against surprise Huddleston was constantly in attendance on the future King of England; his three pupils were stationed as sentinels at upper windows and Thomas Whitgrave patrolled the garden.

On 9 September, Parliamentary troops questioned Whitgrave, while the King and Huddleston were hiding in the priest-hole. The troops were persuaded that Whitgrave had not fought at Worcester (though he had fought and been captured at the Battle of Naseby in 1645). The troops left without searching the house.

== Benedictines of the Spanish Congregation ==
Before the King left to meet Jane Lane at Bentley Hall, he promised to look after Huddleston when restored to his throne. Some time afterward, Huddleston joined the Benedictines of the Spanish Congregation. After the Restoration in 1660, Huddleston was invited to live at Somerset House, London, under the protection of Queen Henrietta Maria. After her death in 1669, he was appointed chaplain to Queen Catherine, with a salary of £100 a year. During the disturbances produced by Titus Oates's pretended revelations of the 'Popish Plot', the House of Lords voted on 7 December 1678 that Huddleston, Thomas Whitgrave, the brothers Penderell, and others involved in Charles II's escape should "for their said service live as freely as any of the King's Protestant subjects, without being liable to the penalties of any of the laws relating to Popish recusants".

When Charles II lay dying on the evening of 5 February 1685, his brother and heir the Duke of York brought Huddleston to his bedside, saying, "Sire, this good man once saved your life. He now comes to save your soul." Charles declared that he wished to die in the faith and communion of the Catholic Church. Huddleston then heard the King's confession, reconciled him to the Church and absolved him, afterwards administering Extreme Unction and the Viaticum. On the accession of James II, Huddleston continued to stay with the Queen Catherine at Somerset House.

== Illness and death ==
Shortly before his death aged 90 his mind failed and he was placed in the charge of a trustee. He was buried in the churchyard of St Mary le Strand.

== Legacy ==
Several portraits of Huddleston exist: Jacob Huysmans' done in 1685 is at Hutton John; another is at Sawston Hall, Cambridgeshire.

His Roman Missal (1623) was bought at auction by the National Trust in 2023 and is on display at Moseley Old Hall.
