= Listed buildings in Featherstone, Staffordshire =

Featherstone is a civil parish in the district of South Staffordshire, Staffordshire, England. It contains three listed buildings that are recorded in the National Heritage List for England. Of these, one is at Grade II*, the middle of the three grades, and the others are at Grade II, the lowest grade. The parish contains the village of Featherstone and the surrounding area. The listed buildings consist of a house with associated structures, a cottage, and agricultural buildings, all of which are timber framed or have timber framed cores.

== Key ==
Grade	Criteria
II*	Particularly important buildings of more than special interest
II	Buildings of national importance and special interest

== Buildings ==
Name and location	Photograph	Date	Notes	Grade
Moseley Old Hall Cottage; 52.63657°N 2.10252°W	—	16th century	The cottage was much rebuilt in the 19th century and remodelled in the 20th century. It has a timber framed core with cruck construction, the outer walls have been rebuilt in brick and plastered, and the roof is tiled. There is one storey and an attic, two bays, and an annexe at the northeast. The windows are casements, there is an attic dormer, and in the annexe is a window with Gothic glazing. Inside the cottage is a central cruck truss.	II
Moseley Old Hall, walls, gatepiers and gate 52.63747°N 2.10238°W		Late 16th century	The house has a timber framed core, and in about 1870 it was encased in red brick with dressings in blue brick, and it has a tile roof. There are two storeys and an attic, and an H-shaped plan, consisting of a hall range and flanking cross-wings, and to the right is a two-storey single-bay extension. The front has a total of six bays and four gables of differing sizes, one being the full-height gabled porch. In the porch is an opening with a four-centred arched head, and the windows are casements with segmental heads. Enclosing the front garden are three brick walls, each with a central gateway and square piers, four of which have stone caps.	II*
Agricultural buildings, Featherstone Farm; 52.64920°N 2.09742°W		c. 1700	The agricultural buildings have been altered and used for other purposes. They are timber framed on a high brick plinth, with infill and rebuilding in brick, and tile roofs. There is one storey and an L-shaped plan, with two ranges of two bays each. The south wall of the south range has been rebuilt in brick with a dentilled eaves band, and contains air vents.	II
