= Staffordshire (constituency) =

Parliamentary constituency in the United Kingdom, 1801–1832

- Former county constituency for the House of Commons
- County: Staffordshire

1290–1832
- Seats: Two
- Replaced by: North Staffordshire and South Staffordshire

Staffordshire was a county constituency of the House of Commons of the Parliament of England then of the Parliament of Great Britain from 1707 to 1800 and of the Parliament of the United Kingdom from 1801 to 1832. It was represented by two Members of Parliament until 1832.

== History ==
=== Boundaries and franchise ===
The constituency, which first returned members to Parliament in 1290, consisted of the historic county of Staffordshire, excluding the city of Lichfield which had the status of a county in itself after 1556. (Although Staffordshire also contained the boroughs of Stafford and Newcastle-under-Lyme, and part of the borough of Tamworth, each of which elected two MPs in its own right for part of the period when Staffordshire was a constituency, these were not excluded from the county constituency, and owning property within the borough could confer a vote at the county election. This was not the case, though, for Lichfield.)

As in other county constituencies the franchise between 1430 and 1832 was defined by the Forty Shilling Freeholder Act, which gave the right to vote to every man who possessed freehold property within the county valued at £2 or more per year for the purposes of land tax; it was not necessary for the freeholder to occupy his land, nor even in later years to be resident in the county at all.

Except briefly during the period of the Commonwealth, Staffordshire had two MPs, traditionally known as Knights of the Shire, elected by the bloc vote method, under which each voter had two votes. (In the First and Second Parliaments of Oliver Cromwell's Protectorate, there was a general redistribution of seats and Staffordshire elected three members; the traditional arrangements were restored from 1659.)

=== Character ===
In the Middle Ages Staffordshire was mainly an agricultural county, but was transformed by the Industrial Revolution and had become significantly urbanised. By the time of the Reform Act 1832, Staffordshire had a population of approximately 410,000, of which around 65,000 were in Wolverhampton, 60,000 in the urban area round Stoke-on-Trent, and 15,000 in Walsall. Its principal industries were hardware and pottery manufacture, and it also drew prosperity from the importance of the River Trent as a means of transport and from the extensive canal network constructed in the county in the 18th century.

Nevertheless, the urban and industrial interests had no opportunity to develop political leverage in Staffordshire. Although the qualified electorate numbered some 5,000 in the 18th century, control of the representation was entirely in the hands of a small number of aristocratic families, most notably the Leveson-Gowers (Marquesses of Stafford) and the Bagots. As in most counties of any size, contested elections were avoided whenever possible because of the expense. Elections were held at a single polling place, Stafford, and voters from the rest of the county had to travel to the county town to exercise their franchise; candidates were expected to meet the expenses of their supporters in travelling to the poll and to entertain them lavishly with food and drink when they got there. The MPs were generally chosen by and from among the principal families of the county, and it would have been futile as well as ruinously expensive for an outsider to fight an election. In fact there were only three contested elections in Staffordshire between 1700 and 1747, and none at all afterwards: in 1753, the Leveson Gowers and the Bagots, despite their political differences (the former being Whigs and the latter Tories) reached a satisfactory compromise, and thereafter the Leveson Gowers nominated one MP and the remaining county gentry the other (who was frequently a Bagot).

=== Abolition ===
The constituency was abolished by the Reform Act 1832, which divided the county into two new two-member divisions, Northern Staffordshire and Southern Staffordshire, and also created new boroughs from three of the larger towns previously in the county constituency (Stoke-upon-Trent, Walsall and Wolverhampton).

== Members of Parliament ==
=== MPs 1290–1640 ===
Parliament	First member	Second member
1295	Richard de Caverswall	
1324	Sir John de Arderne	
1332	Philip de Lutley	
1336	Sir Robert de Mauveysin	
1341	Adam de Peshale or Peshall	
1378	Robert Stafford	Sir Robert de Swynnerton
1380	Robert Stafford	
1380	Sir Robert Peshall	
1382	Robert Stafford	
1382	John Basset	
1383	Robert Stafford	
1383	Sir Robert Peshall	
1386	Sir William Shareshull	Aymer Lichfield
1388 (Feb)	Sir John Ipstones	Roger Longridge
1388 (Sep)	Sir Thomas Aston	John Delves
1389	William Chetwynd?	
Sir Nicholas Stafford| John Delves
1390 (Nov)	[Sir Nicholas Stafford]]	John Delves
1391	Sir John Bagot	William Walsall
1393	Sir Thomas Aston	William Walsall I
1394	Sir John Ipstones (murdered on arrival in London February 1394)	William Walsall
1395	Sir William Shareshull	Aymer Lichfield
1397 (Jan)	Sir John Bagot	Sir Robert Francis
1397 (Sep)	Sir John Bagot	Rustin Villeneuve
1399	Sir Thomas Aston	Sir Robert Francis
1401	Sir John Bagot	Sir Robert Francis
1402	John Swynnerton	William Walsall
1404 (Jan)	Ralph Stafford	William Walsall
1404 (Oct)	Sir John Bagot	Sir Robert Francis
1406	Sir Thomas Aston	Sir Humphrey Stafford
1407	Sir John Bagot	Sir William Newport
1410		
1411	Sir John Bagot	Sir William Newport
1413 (Feb)		
1413 (May)	Sir Thomas Gresley	Hugh Erdeswyk
1414 (Apr)	John Meverel	William Walsall
1414 (Nov)	John Meverel	Sir William Newport
1415		
1416 (Mar)	Humphrey Haughton	Roger Bradshaw
1416 (Oct)		
1417		
1419	Sir Thomas Gresley	Sir Richard Vernon
1420	William Lee II	John Mynors
1421 (May)	Sir John Bagot	Richard Lane
1421 (Dec)	Hugh Erdeswyk	Richard Lane
1422	Sir Thomas Stanley	Sir John Gresley
1431	John Mynors	John Harpour
1437	John Hampton	John Mynors
1439	John Hampton	
1442	John Hampton	
1445	Robert Whitgreve	
1449 (Feb)	John Hampton	
1449 (Nov)	Robert Whitgreve	John Hampton
1455	Sir William Vernon	
1467	Sir John Delves	
1491	William Chetwynd	
1504	Sir Edmond Dudley	
1510–1523	No Names Known	
1529	Sir John Giffard	Edward Littleton
1536		
1539	Edward Littleton	Thomas Giffard
1542	Sir John Dudley	Sir Philip Draycott
1545	Sir George Griffith	Thomas Fitzherbert
1547	Sir William Paget, ennobled and replaced Jan 1552 by Sir Ralph Bagnall	Sir John Harcourt
1553 (Mar)	William Devereux	Walter Aston
1553 (Oct)	Sir Thomas Giffard	Edward Littleton
1554 (Apr)	Sir Philip Draycott	Thomas Grey
1554 (Nov)	Sir Philip Draycott	(Sir) Edward Littleton
1555	Sir Thomas Giffard	(Sir) Edward Littleton
1558	Brian Fowler	Francis Meverell
1559 (Jan)	Sir Ralph Bagnall	Simon Harcourt
1562–1563	Simon Harcourt	John Grey
1571	John Grey	Thomas Trentham
1572 (Apr)	John Fleetwood	Thomas Whorwood
1584 (Nov)	Hon. Edward Dudley (alias Sutton)	Edward Legh
1586	John Grey	William Bassett
1588-1589	(Sir) Walter Harcourt	Thomas Gerard
1593	(Sir) Walter Harcourt	Sir Christopher Blount
1597-1598	Hon. John Dudley	Sir Christopher Blount
1601	Sir Thomas Gerard	Sir John Egerton
1604-1611	Sir Edward Littleton; Littleton dying 1610 - replaced by Francis Trentham	Robert Stanford; Stanford died 1597 - replaced by Sir John Egerton
Addled Parliament (1614)	Sir Walter Chetwynd	Thomas Crompton
1621-1622	Sir William Bowyer	Thomas Crompton
Happy Parliament (1624-1625)	Sir William Bowyer	Sir Edward Littleton
Useless Parliament (1625)	Richard Erdeswicke	Sir Simon Weston
1625-1626	Sir William Bowyer	Sir Simon Weston
1628-1629	Sir Hervey Bagot	Thomas Crompton
1629-1640	No Parliaments summoned	

=== MPs 1640–1832 ===
Election	First member	First party	Second member	Second party
April 1640	Sir Edward Littleton	Parliamentarian	Sir William Bowyer	
November 1640	Sir Edward Littleton	Parliamentarian	Sir William Bowyer	Parliamentarian
1641	Sir Edward Littleton	Parliamentarian	Sir Hervey Bagot	Royalist
November 1642	Sir Edward Littleton	Parliamentarian	Bagot disabled from sitting - seat vacant	
March 1644	Littleton disabled from sitting - seat vacant		Bagot disabled from sitting - seat vacant	
1646	John Bowyer		Sir Richard Skeffington	
1647	John Bowyer		Thomas Crompton	
December 1648	Bowyer excluded in Pride's Purge - seat vacant		Thomas Crompton	
1653	George Bellot		John Chetwood	
Staffordshire's representation was increased to three Members in the First and Second Parliaments of the Protectorate
1654	Sir Charles Wolseley, Thomas Crompton, Thomas Whitgrave			
1656	Sir Charles Wolseley, Thomas Crompton, Thomas Whitgrave			
Staffordshire's representation reverted to two Members in the Third Protectorate Parliament
January 1659	Thomas Crompton		Sir Thomas Whitgrave	
May 1659	Thomas Crompton			
April 1660	Edward Bagot		William Sneyd	
1661	Sir Thomas Leigh		Randolph Egerton	
1663	Sir Edward Littleton		Randolph Egerton	
1679	Sir Walter Bagot		Sir John Bowyer	
1685	Sir Walter Bagot		Edward Littleton	
1689	Sir Walter Bagot		John Grey	
1690	Walter Chetwynd		John Grey	
1693	Sir Walter Bagot		John Grey	
1695	Henry Paget	Tory	John Grey	
1698	Henry Paget	Tory	(Sir) Edward Bagot	
1708	Henry Paget	Tory	John Wrottesley	
1710	Henry Paget	Tory	William Ward	
1712	Charles Bagot		William Ward	
1713	Ralph Sneyd		Henry Vernon	
1715	Lord Paget	Tory	William Ward	
1720 by-election	Lord Paget	Tory	Hon. William Leveson-Gower	
1727	Sir Walter Wagstaffe Bagot	Tory	Hon. William Leveson-Gower	
1754	(Sir) William Bagot	Tory	Hon. William Leveson-Gower	
1757 by-election	(Sir) William Bagot	Tory	Hon. Henry Thynne	
1761	(Sir) William Bagot	Tory	Lord Grey	Whig
May 1768 by-election	(Sir) William Bagot	Tory	Captain (Sir) John Wrottesley	Whig
1780	Viscount Lewisham	Tory	Captain (Sir) John Wrottesley	Whig
1784	Sir Edward Littleton	Whig	Captain (Sir) John Wrottesley	Whig
1787 by-election	Sir Edward Littleton	Whig	Earl Gower	Whig
1799 by-election	Sir Edward Littleton	Whig	Lord Granville Leveson-Gower	Whig
May 1812 by-election	Edward Littleton	Canningite Tory	Lord Granville Leveson-Gower	Whig
1815 by-election	Edward Littleton	Canningite Tory	Earl Gower	Whig
1820	Edward Littleton	Canningite Tory	Sir John Fenton Boughey	Whig
1823 by-election	Edward Littleton	Canningite Tory	Major-General Sir John Wrottesley	Whig
c. 1830	Edward Littleton	Whig	Major-General Sir John Wrottesley	Whig
1832	Constituency abolished: replaced by North Staffordshire and South Staffordshire			

== See also ==
- List of former United Kingdom Parliament constituencies
- Unreformed House of Commons
