= Robert Stafford (MP) =

14th-century English politician

Robert Stafford was the Member of Parliament for Staffordshire in 1378, 1380, 1382 and 1383.
