= Sir Edward Bagot, 2nd Baronet =

Member of the Parliament of England

Sir Edward Bagot, 2nd Baronet (23 May 1616 – 30 May 1673) was an English landowner and politician who sat in the House of Commons in 1660.

Bagot was the son of Sir Hervey Bagot of Field Hall, Leigh and his first wife Katherine Adderley, daughter of Humphrey Adderley of Weddington, Warwickshire. He was educated at Trinity College, Oxford and was admitted to the Middle Temple in 1635. He became a J.P. for Staffirdshire in 1656. As he was appointed under the Protectorate, he was eligible under the Long Parliament ordinance to stand for the Convention Parliament and in April 1660, he was elected Member of Parliament for Staffordshire. He succeeded to the baronetcy of Blithfield Hall on the death of his father in December 1660.

Bagot died at the age of 57 and was buried at Blithfield.

Bagot married Mary Crawley, widow of John Crawley of Someries, Bedfordshire and daughter of William Lambard of BuckinghamLampard in 1641. They had twelve sons and five daughters and he was succeeded in the baronetcy by his son Walter. Their daughter Mary (1646–1692) married Sir Richard Newdigate 2nd Baronet of Arbury.

Baronetage of England
Preceded by Hervey Bagot	Baronet (of Blithfield); 1660–1673	Succeeded by Walter Bagot
