= William Sneyd (MP for Staffordshire) =

Member of the Parliament of England

William Sneyd (ca. 1614 – January 1695) was an English politician who sat in the House of Commons in 1660.

Sneyd was the son of Ralph Sneyd of Keele, Staffordshire, a member of the ancient family of Sneyd. He was educated at Chell, Staffordshire under Mr Stevenson and was admitted to Caius College, Cambridge on 7 July 1632. He was admitted at Gray's Inn on 9 May 1634.

In 1660, Sneyd was elected Member of Parliament for Staffordshire in the Convention Parliament. He was a J.P. and was High Sheriff of Staffordshire in 1663.

Sneyd died at the age of 80 and was buried at Wolstanton, Staffordshire on 17 January 1695.

Sneyd married Elizabeth Audeley, daughter of Robert Audeley, of Gransden, and had issue.
