= Thomas Whitgrave =

Philipp Grimm
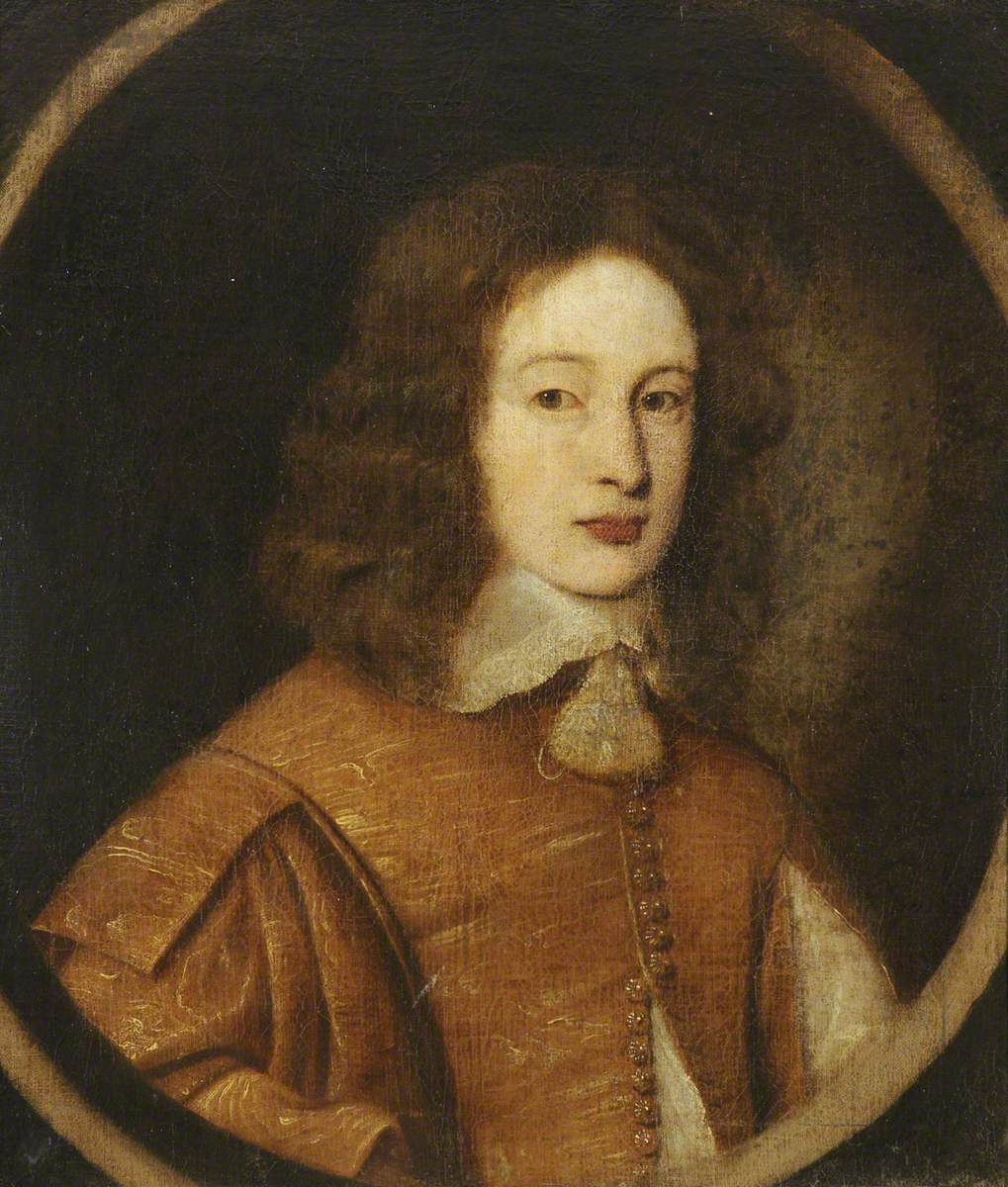
- 1640 portrait of Whitgrave
- Born: Thomas Whitgrave; 1618
- Died: 14 July 1702 (aged 83/84); Wolverhampton, England
- Resting place: St Mary's Church, Bushbury
- Occupations: Lawyer and Member of Parliament for Staffordshire under Oliver Cromwell
- Children: 11 (8 sons and 3 daughters)

Thomas Whitgrave (or Whitgreave) (1618 – 14 July 1702) was the Member of Parliament for Staffordshire for the First, Second and Third Protectorate parliaments who was knighted by the Lord Protector Oliver Cromwell in 1658. He was also considered as a potential recipient Knight of the Royal Oak, a reward to those Englishmen who faithfully and actively supported Charles II during his exile in France. (The knighthoods conferred by the Lord Protector were not recognised after the Restoration.)

== Biography ==
Thomas Whitgrave was born in 1618 to Thomas Whitgreave and Alice Shaw and he had seven sisters. He lived in Moseley Old Hall until no later than 1657.

He became a lawyer by 1645 and was a Member of Parliament for Staffordshire for the First, Second and Third Protectorate parliaments between 1654 and 1659. He was also knighted by the Lord Protector Oliver Cromwell in 1658 and was given a pension in 1666, which was continued in his sons' name by 1677.

Whitgrave, a Catholic, was prosecuted for recusancy in 1675 but he was exempted in 1678–9 following the Popish Plot. During this time he also became a Gentleman Usher for Catherine of Braganza.

Thomas Whitegrave died on 4 July 1702 in Wolverhampton and was buried at St. Mary's Church in Bushbury, Wolverhampton.

=== Marriage and issue ===
Whitgreave married twice. He married a widow named Constance in 1669 and bore two sons. He then remarried on 27 February 1692 to Isobel Turville of Aston Flamville, who bore six sons and three daughters.

== Aiding escape of King Charles II ==
After the defeat at the Battle of Worcester on 3 September 1651, Charles II was conducted by Colonel Gifford to White Ladies Priory on Gifford's Boscobel estate. At White Ladies, the King was sheltered by the five Penderell brothers who lived there. John Penderell happened to meet Father Huddleston, who suggested that the King should go to Moseley Old Hall on the night of 7 September. He was welcomed by Thomas Whitgrave (Whitgreave), the owner of the house, Alice Whitgrave, Thomas's mother, and John Huddleston, the Catholic priest of the house. They gave Charles dry clothes, food, and a proper bed (his first since Worcester on 3 September). To guard against surprise, Huddleston was constantly in attendance on the king; his three pupils were stationed as sentinels at upper windows and Thomas Whitgrave patrolled the garden. On 9 September, Parliamentary troops questioned Whitgrave while the King and Huddleston were hiding in the priest hole. The troops were persuaded that Whitgrave had not fought at Worcester (though he had fought and been captured at the Battle of Naseby in 1645). The troops left without searching the house.
