= De Courten =

De Courten is a surname. Notable people with the surname include:

- Juan de Courten (elder) (1730–1796), Spanish general
- Juan de Courten (younger) (1765–1834), Spanish general
- Raffaele de Courten (1888–1978), Italian admiral
