= Moseley Old Hall =

Historic house and museum in Featherstone, Staffordshire, England

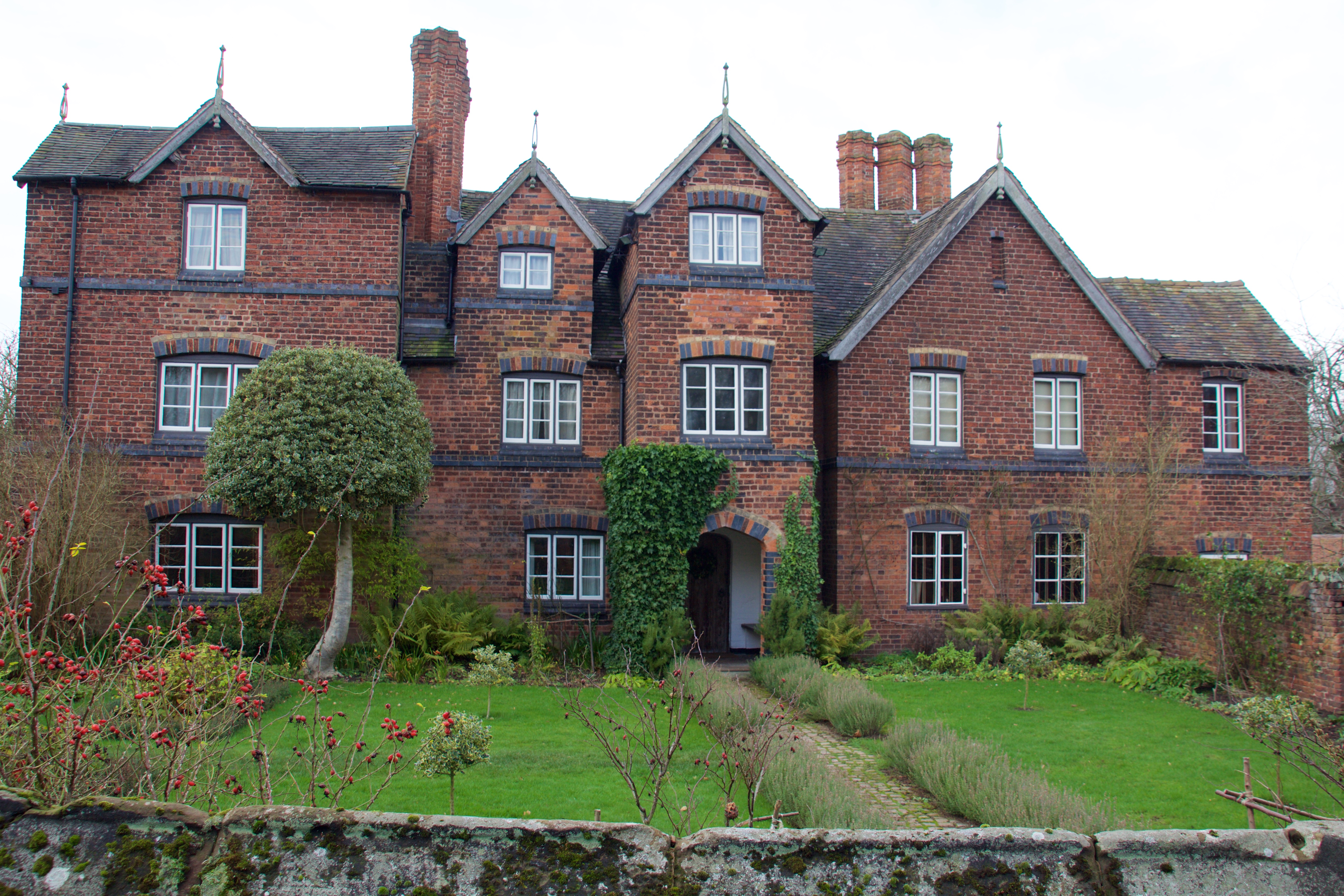

General information
- Coordinates: 52.6374°N 2.1024°W
- Completed: c. 1600

Website
- www.nationaltrust.org.uk/moseley-old-hall/

Moseley Old Hall is located in Fordhouses, north of Wolverhampton in the United Kingdom. It is notable as one of the hiding places of Charles II during his escape to France following defeat at the Battle of Worcester in 1651. Now owned by the National Trust, the hall is a Grade II* listed building.

== Hall ==
The Hall is located in Staffordshire.

=== Construction and early history ===
The estate was owned by a Cordsall family until it was purchased by Henry Pitt of Bushby, one of the Merchants of the Staple, in 1583. Henry Pitt built the current building in c. 1600.

Originally known as 'Mr Pitt's new hall at Moseley', it was a half-timbered building located in remote woodland. When Henry died in 1602, the hall was inherited by Alice Pitt, his daughter, who later married Thomas Whitgreave from Bridgeford, Staffordshire, whose family came from the nearby Whitgreave.

=== Role in Charles II's escape ===
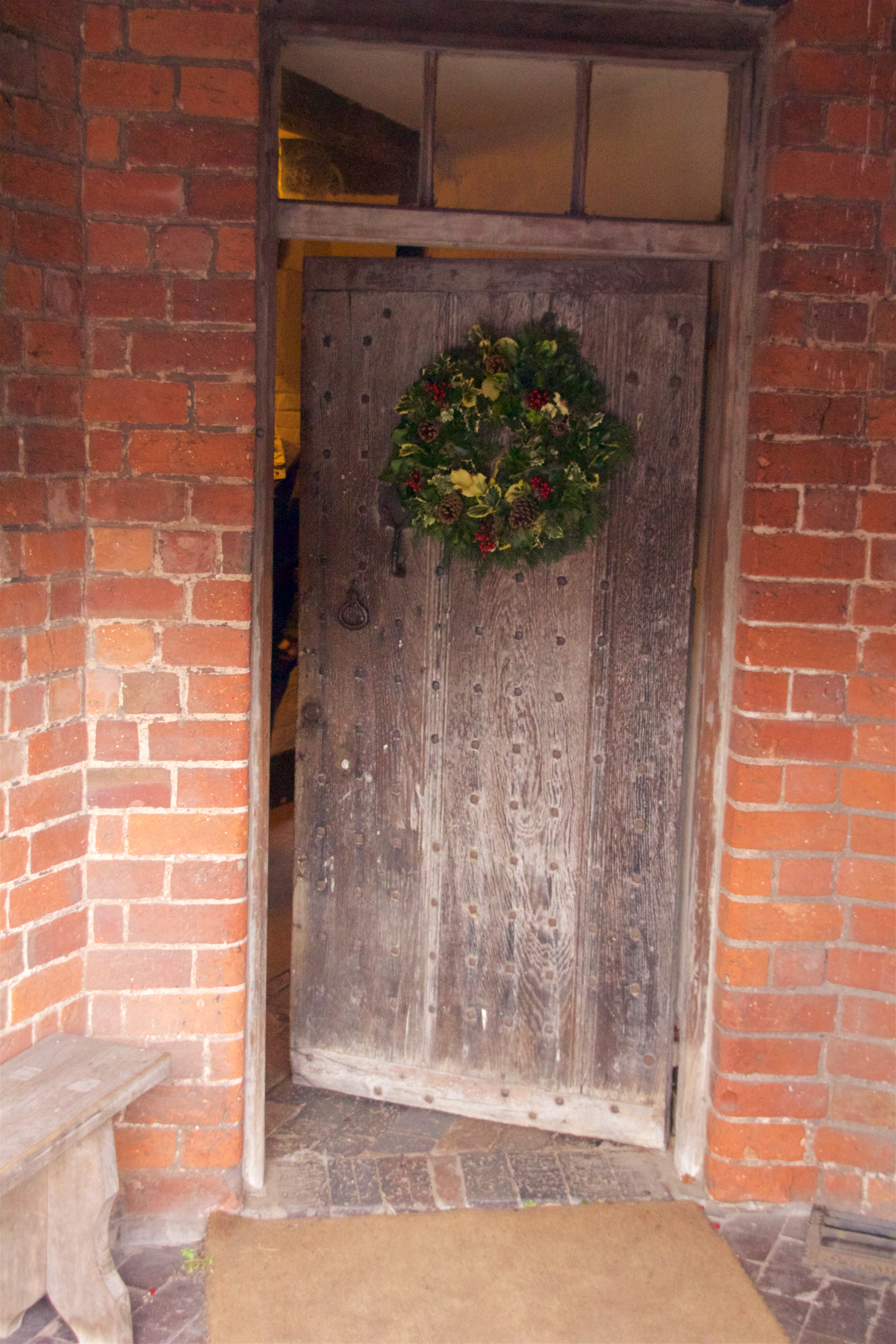
The original back door of the hall that Charles entered in September 1651.

After the final battle of the English Civil War, the Battle of Worcester on 3 September 1651, King Charles II escaped and was on the run from Parliamentarians. Charles arrived at the back door of Moseley Old Hall in the early morning of 8 September, after the journey from Boscobel House. He arrived cold and wet, disguised in workman's clothing and ill-fitting shoes that had made his feet bleed. He was welcomed by Thomas Whitgreave, the owner of the house, Alice Whitgreave, Thomas's mother, and John Huddleston, the Catholic priest of the house. They gave Charles dry clothes, food, and a proper bed (his first since Worcester on 3 September). Huddleston cleaned and bandaged the King's feet.

Charles was hidden in the priest-hole on the afternoon of 8 September while a confrontation between Whitgreave and parliamentarians took place outside the hall. He later rested on a four-poster bed in the hall. He left the house two days later, having planned out the rest of his escape. He was accompanied by Huddleston.

=== Later use ===
The family residence moved to Moseley Court around the 1820s, which was a new Regency-style house built for George Whitgreave. Few structural changes were made to the Hall until around 1870, when the outer walls of the building were replaced by bricks, and casements replaced the Elizabethan windows. Around that time, a first floor corridor was constructed. Descendants of the Whitgreave family owned the house until 1925, at which point the estate was sold. The house was subsequently used as a farmhouse, and fell into disrepair. It was purchased by Will Wiggin from Bloxwich in 1940, who started to repair the house, but the Second World War interrupted the repair work, which Will Wiggin was unable to complete before his death.

=== National Trust ownership ===
The Wiggin family transferred the ownership of the Hall and an acre of land to the National Trust in 1962, and it was opened to the public in 1963. The hall was nearly empty of furniture at the time; most of the furniture and pictures in the hall have been subsequently lent or given to the Trust. In 1981 the roof and brickwork were repaired, and the bargeboards and finials were replaced. It is now fully restored, and furnished with donated period furniture. The original four-poster bed used by Charles stands in the King's room. In 2023, the Trust bought John Huddleston's prayerbook at auction, and placed it on display at the hall.

=== Layout and listing ===
The ground floor includes an entrance hall, a parlour, and a brew-house. The first floor hosts Mr Whitgreave's room and the King's Room, along with the dressing room, study and a corridor. The second floor contains the chapel, ante-room, bedroom, main attic and garrett. The hall is a Grade II* listed building.

== Garden ==
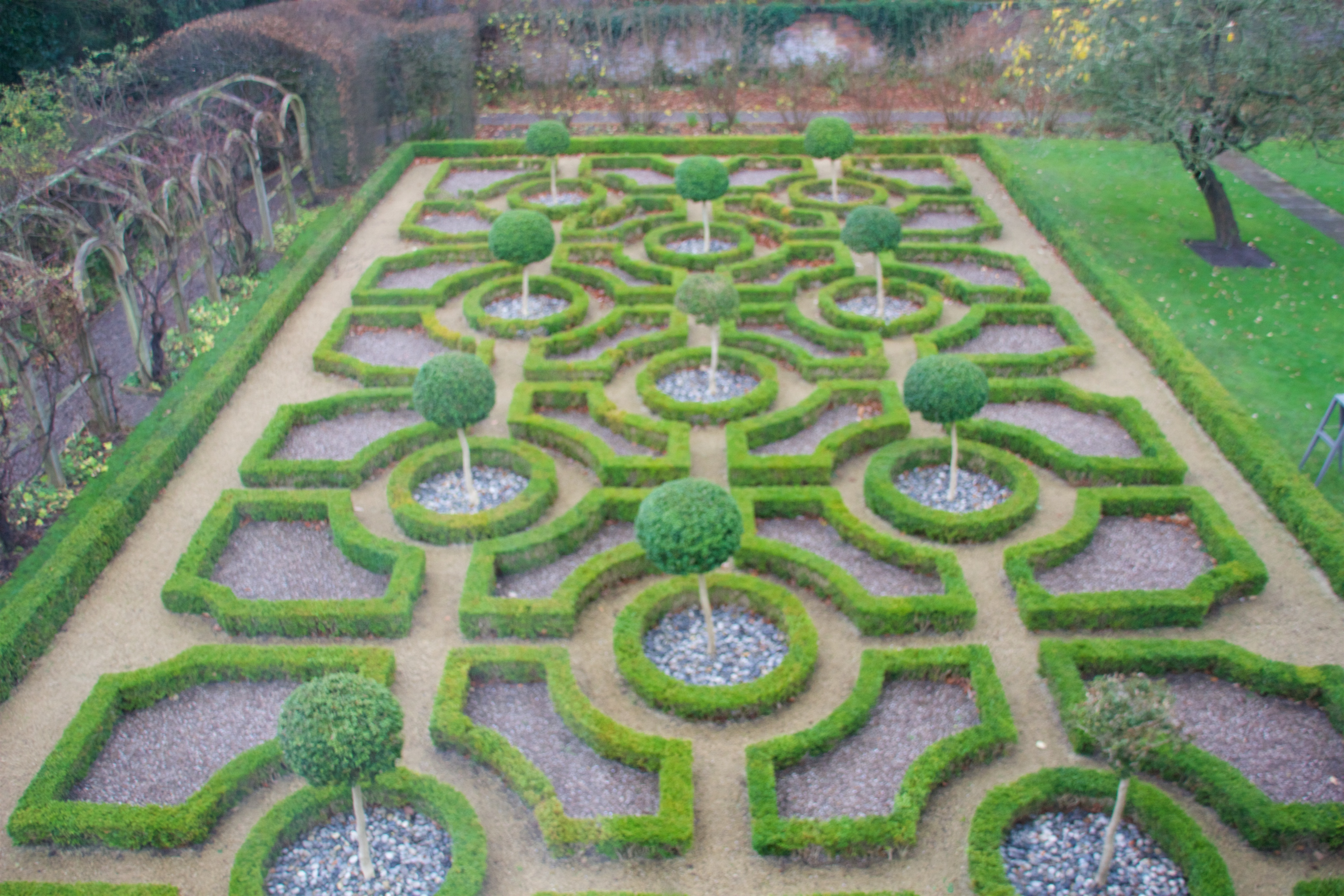
The knot garden

The garden features a 17th-century-style (recreated) enclosed garden containing period plants. It has a herb garden, topiary, a fruit orchard, an arbour, a walled garden, and a 'knot' garden.

== See also ==
- Grade II* listed buildings in South Staffordshire
- Listed buildings in Featherstone, Staffordshire
