= Sir John Bowyer, 1st Baronet =

English soldier and politician

Sir John Bowyer, 1st Baronet (21 September 1623 – 18 July 1666) was a 17th-century English soldier and politician.

Bowyer was the son of Sir William Bowyer, a wealthy Staffordshire landowner of Knypersley Hall, near Biddulph and his wife Hester Skeffington.

Bowyer was a Colonel in the Parliamentary army during the English Civil War and fought at the Battle of Hopton Heath and was involved in the destruction of Eccleshall Castle. He was elected Member of Parliament for Staffordshire in 1646 to the Long Parliament. He was excluded from the House of Commons under Pride's Purge on 6 December 1646. He was elected as MP for Newcastle-under-Lyme in 1656 in the Second Protectorate Parliament, but never sat. In 1660 he was re-elected MP for Newcastle-under-Lyme for the Convention Parliament and sat until 1661.

On the Restoration, as Colonel of the Staffordshire Militia, he arrested Maj-Gen Thomas Harrison as one of the Regicides of Charles I. Bowyer was created a baronet by Charles II on 11 September 1660. He was High Sheriff of Staffordshire in 1662.

He married firstly in 1648 Mary Milward, daughter of Robert Milward of Bradlow Ash, Derbyshire. He married secondly in 1665 Elizabeth Egerton, daughter of Sir Ralph Egerton of Betley, Staffordshire.

Parliament of England
Preceded by Sir Hervey Bagot, 1st Baronet; Sir Edward Littleton, 1st Baronet	Member of Parliament for Staffordshire; 1646–1648; With: Sir Richard Skeffington 1646; Thomas Crompton	Not represented in the Rump Parliament
Preceded by Edward Keeling	Member of Parliament for Newcastle-under-Lyme; 1656	Succeeded by Edward Keeling; Tobias Bridge
Not represented in the restored Rump	Member of Parliament for Newcastle-under-Lyme; 1660–1661; With: Samuel Terrick	Succeeded by Sir Caesar Colclough; Edward Mainwaring
Baronetage of England
New creation	Baronet (of Knipersley); 1660–1666	Succeeded by John Bowyer
