= Courten baronets =

Extinct baronetcy in the Baronetage of England

The Courten Baronetcy, of Aldington in the County of Worcester, was a title in the Baronetage of England. It was created on 18 May 1622 for Peter Courten, the son of the wealthy merchant Sir William Courten, who married Jane, sister of the 1st Earl of Chesterfield. The title became extinct on Courten's early death in 1624.

== Courten baronets, of Aldington (1622) ==
- Sir Peter Courten, 1st Baronet (c. 1598–1624)

Coat of arms of Courten baronets, of Aldington
Notes No royal licence can be found, so these the arms of Williams of Edwinsford are quartered as a standard quartering through an heiress. Crest A demi talbot sable. Escutcheon Or, a talbot passant Sable.
