= Thomas Fitzherbert (MP for Staffordshire) =

16th-century English politician

Sir Thomas Fitzherbert (1513/14 – 2 October 1591) was an English member of Parliament and sheriff in England in the 16th century.

== Biography ==
Fitzherbert was the second but first surviving son of Sir Anthony Fitzherbert and Maud (née Cotton). He married Anne, daughter and heir of Sir Anthony Eyre of Padley, and through her the Fitzherberts were able to add the manors of Padley and Hathersage in the Derbyshire Peak to their holdings. On his father's death in 1538, Sir Thomas succeeded to the estates, and still in his twenties became Sheriff of Staffordshire in 1543 and a member of the last Henrician parliament, 1545–7. Under Philip and Mary he was knighted, and was sheriff again in 1554, but his and his family's fortunes changed with the accession of Elizabeth I. Having refused the Oath of Supremacy, Sir Thomas was arrested in 1561, and imprisoned in the Fleet Prison, London. He spent the rest of his life in one form of imprisonment or another, and died in the Tower of London on 2 October 1591.

Having no children of his own, Sir Thomas's heir was his nephew, also called Thomas, the eldest son of his brother John. This man became a henchman of Richard Topcliffe, Elizabeth I's friend and enforcer of her penal laws against the practice of Catholicism. Thomas bound himself to pay Topcliffe £3,000 for the prosecution to death of his uncle, his father, and a cousin, William Bassett of Blore, Staffordshire. His father and uncle both died in prison, but Topcliffe failed to establish a case against Bassett, and so Thomas junior refused to pay up, especially since, as he said, his father and uncle died of natural causes. Topcliffe then sued for the money in the court of Chancery. The case was put over to a secret hearing where it was decided, with the queen's backing, in Topcliffe's favor. By then Fitzherbert was in such financial difficulty himself that Topcliffe never saw the money.

The Fitzherberts were an important and influential family in Staffordshire and Derbyshire, and Topcliffe was determined to destroy them. At one point he had Sir Thomas, his brothers John and Richard, and his nephew Anthony all in prison. The three brothers died there, but with the advice and help of Gilbert Talbot, 7th Earl of Shrewsbury, Anthony was released on a promise to conform to the Protestant Church of England. He immediately set about saving his family's patrimony, which his brother was selling off as fast as he could. He recovered the chief manor of Norbury, but his brother had made over Padley, the house where he and his father had been arrested, to Topcliffe. In 1604, with Elizabeth I dead and James I now king, Earl Gilbert, now a privy councilor, "heaved" Topcliffe out of Padley, and that estate too went back to Anthony Fitzherbert, who quietly resumed his Catholicism.

When the family's senior branch failed with the death of Anthony's son Sir John in 1649, the junior branch, descended from Sir Thomas's brother William of Swynnerton, Staffordshire, inherited their properties, which they combined with their own. The Fitzherberts are still at Swynnerton, where they now hold the title Baron Stafford, and they are still Catholic. Topcliffe, on the other hand, had bankrupted himself paying for his policing activities out of his own pocket. His unfortunate heir, Charles Topcliffe, had no option but to sell his estate, Somerby, just outside Gainsborough, and the Topcliffes seem to have disappeared as a family of some consequence.
