= Thomas Crompton (died 1608) =

English politician, died 1608

Sir Thomas Crompton (c. 1557 – 5 February 1608) was an English barrister and judge who briefly sat in the House of Commons in the years 1587, 1601, and 1604. He became master in chancery in 1608, shortly before his death.

Crompton was the son of Sir Thomas Crompton. He matriculated at St Alban Hall, Oxford under date 20 December 1577, aged 19 and was awarded BA from Merton College on 28 January 1579 and MA on 1 December 1581. He was admitted at Inner Temple in 1581 and was awarded B and DCL at Oxford on 11 July 1589. He was a Judge of the High Court of Admiralty in Southwark, the high court of admiralty from c. 1605 until his death in 1608.

In 1587, Crompton was elected Member of Parliament for Boroughbridge. He was elected MP for Whitchurch in 1601. He was knighted on 23 July 1603. In 1604 he was elected as the first MP for Oxford University. He was chancellor of the diocese of London from 1607 and master in chancery from 1608.

Crompton died on 5 February 1608.

Parliament of England
Preceded by John Brograve; Vincent Skinner	Member of Parliament for Boroughbridge; 1597; With: Sir Henry Fanshawe	Succeeded by Richard Whaley; Thomas Fairfax
Preceded by Thomas Henshaw; Richard Carey	Member of Parliament for Whitchurch; 1601; With: Thomas Henshaw	Succeeded by Thomas Brookes; Sir Richard Pawlett
New constituency	Member of Parliament for Oxford University; 1604–1609; With: Sir Daniel Donne	Succeeded by Sir Daniel Donne; Sir John Bennet
