= Bagot baronets =

Set index for Bagot baronets

There have been two Bagot baronetcies, one in the Baronetage of England, and onr in the Baronetage of the United Kingdom. As of 2026, one is extant.

- Bagot baronets of Blithfield Hall (1627): see Baron Bagot.
- Bagot baronets of Levens Hall (1913)
