= Hervey Bagot =

English politician (1591-1660)

Sir Hervey Bagot, 1st Baronet (8 February 1591 – 27 December 1660) was an English MP.

He was born in Checkley, Staffordshire, the son of Walter Bagot and Elizabeth Cave. He matriculated at Trinity College, Oxford University on 18 November 1608. Until his first marriage he lived in Checkley and then moved to Field Hall, near the family's ancestral Blithfield home.

He was High Sheriff of Staffordshire in 1626 and Member of Parliament (MP) for Staffordshire in 1628–29 and 1641–42. He was created 1st Baronet Bagot of Blithfield Hall in the Baronetage of England on 31 May 1627.

== Family ==
Bagot married twice; firstly Katherine Adderley, daughter of Humphrey Adderley, Esq. Lord of the Manor of Weddington, Warwickshire and Gentleman of the Wardrobe to King Henry VIII, King Edward VI, Queen Mary I and Queen Elizabeth I. By his first wife he had six children, including his successor Edward and Richard.

Secondly, Ann Fisher, daughter of Sir Clement Fisher.

Bagot died at Field Hall and was buried at Blithfield; his title was inherited by his eldest surviving son Edward.

== Legacy and the Virginia Line ==
A probable nephew of Hervey Bagot, John Bagot, married Martha Mathews, and went to the Thirteen Colonies. This John changed the family name to Baggett and started the American branch of the Bagot/Baggett family. He lived in either Surry County or Isle of Wight County, Virginia.

Baronetage of England
| New creation | Baronet (of Blithfield); 1627–1660 | Succeeded by Edward Bagot |
