= William Courteen =

Sir William Courteen or Curteen (1572–1636) was a wealthy 17th century merchant, operating from London. He financed the colonisation of Barbados, but lost his investment and interest in the islands to the Earl of Carlisle.

== Birth and upbringing ==
Sir William Courteen was the son of William Courteen, by his wife Margaret Casiere, and was born in London in 1572. A younger brother, born in 1581, was named Peter. Their father was son of a tailor of Menin and a protestant. After enduring persecution at the hands of the Spaniards, he escaped to England in 1568; his wife, a daughter Margaret, and her husband Michael Boudean accompanied him. The refugees at first set up a manufactory of French hoods in Abchurch Lane, London, but afterwards removed to Pudding Lane, where they traded in silk and linen. The son-in-law, Boudean, soon died, leaving a son Peter, and the daughter married a second husband, John Money, an English merchant. The father and mother apparently lived till the close of Elizabeth's reign.

== Marriage and trading activities ==
At an early age Courteen was sent to Haarlem, as factor to his father's firm, and the younger brother, Peter, went to Cologne.

At Haarlem, William married the deaf and mute daughter of Peter Cromling, a Dutch merchant there, which brought him a dowry of £60,000. About 1600 William returned to London, and Peter remained as his agent in Holland, but paid his brother frequent visits. In 1606 the two brothers entered into partnership with their brother-in-law John Moncy to continue and extend the elder Courteen's silk and linen business. William contributed half the capital. In 1619 proceedings were taken in the Star Chamber against Courteen, Philip Burlamacchi, and other foreign merchants settled in England, for exporting gold, and a fine of £20,000 was levied on Courteen. The firm, Courteen & Moncy, prospered, and it was estimated in 1631 that the capital amounted to £150,000. The prominence of the brothers in the city secured each of them the honour of knighthood. William was knighted 31 May 1622, and Peter 22 February 1622–3.

William's operations were not confined to his London business: he built ships and traded to Guinea, Portugal, Spain, and the West Indies. His fleet at one time numbered twenty vessels, with nearly five thousand sailors on board. About 1624 one of his ships discovered an uninhabited island, to which Courteen gave the name of Barbadoes. It seems that his agents in Zeeland had suggested to him the expedition. With a view to profiting to the fullest extent by his discovery, he petitioned in 1625 for the grant of all unknown land in the south part of the world, which he called 'Terra Australis Incognita'. In the same year he sent out a few colonists to the islands, and on 25 February 1627-8 received letters-patent formally legalising the colonisation. The grant was addressed to 'the Earl of Pembroke in trust for Sir William Courteen'. Courteen, in accordance with the deed, began colonisation on a large scale. He sent two ships with 1850 persons on board to Barbadoes, under Captain Powel, who, on his arrival, was nominated governor by Courteen and the Earl of Pembroke; but the speculation proved disastrous. Three years later James Hay, 1st Earl of Carlisle, disputed this grant, claiming, under deeds dated 2 July 1627 and 7 April 1628, to be owner of all the Caribbee islands lying between ten and twenty degrees of latitude, (Barbados itself situated at thirteen degrees). In 1629 Carlisle sent two ships, with Henry Hawley as his representative, to take possession of the island. On their arrival they imprisoned Captain Powel, and established Lord Carlisle's authority. The islands remained in Carlisle's hands till 1646, when the lease of them was transferred to Lord Willoughby of Parham. Courteen claimed to have lost £44,000 by these transactions, and left his descendants to claim compensation. In many of his speculations Sir Paul Pindar was associated with Courteen, and they lent money freely to James I and Charles I. Their joint loans ultimately amounted to £200,000. Failure to obtain any consideration for these heavy loans was the subject of much subsequent litigation.

Losses of ships and merchandise sustained at the hands of the Dutch in the East Indies, after the Amboyna massacre, combined with the injustice he suffered in Barbadoes injured Courteen's credit at the opening of Charles I's reign. In 1631 the death of his brother Peter, his agent at Middelburg, increased his difficulties. Sir Peter died unmarried, and left his nephew Peter Boudean, who was then settled in Holland, a legacy of £10,000. Boudean had quarrelled with his uncle William, and used every unscrupulous means to injure him. To satisfy his claim on the estate of Sir Peter, Boudean now seized the whole property of the firm of Courteen & Moncy in Holland. The death of Moncy in 1632 further complicated matters. Courteen was one of Moncy's executors, and Peter Boudean, his stepson, was the other. But the latter declined to administer the estate. Courteen at once took action at law to recover his share of the estates of his brother and his partner; the proceedings dragged on long after his death. In spite, however, of these troubles, Courteen was still enormously wealthy. In 1628 he paid Charles I £5,000 and received lands in Whittlewood Forest, Northamptonshire. In 1633 he owned land in England, chiefly in Northamptonshire, which produced £6,500. a year, besides possessing a capital of £128,000. His love of maritime enterprise was still vigorous. In the last years of his life he again opened up trade with the East Indies when in 1635 King Charles I granted a trading licence to him under the name of the Courteen association permitting it also to trade with the east at any location in which the East India Company had no presence. He sent two ships (the Dragon and Katherine) to trade with China. The ships never arrived at their destination, and the consequent loss was Courteen's deathblow. He died at the end of May or beginning of June 1636, and was buried in the church of St. Andrew Hubbard, Eastcheap. He left many legacies to charitable institutions in his will; but his joint claims with Sir Paul Pindar on the crown, and his claims on his nephew and on Lord Carlisle, were unsettled at the time of his death.

== Legacy ==
Courteen had a son, Peter, by his first wife, who was made a baronet by James I in 1622 (see Courteen baronets); married Jane, daughter of Sir John Stanhope, and died without issue early in 1625. He is usually described as of Aldington, Worcestershire. Courteen's second wife was a daughter of Moses Tryon, and by her he had a son, William, and three daughters, Hester (wife of Sir Edward Littleton); Mary (wife of Henry Grey, 10th Earl of Kent); Anna (wife (1) of Essex Devereux, heir of the 5th Viscount Hereford and (2) of Sir Richard Knightley). William, the younger, found his father's estate seriously embarrassed by the proceedings of his cousin Peter Boudean, who declined to surrender any of the Dutch property. Complicated litigation continued. Courteen married Catharine Egerton, daughter of John Egerton, 1st Earl of Bridgewater; and, resolving to carry on his father's business, chartered with his father-in-law's aid, two vessels (Bona Esperanza and Henry Bonaventura) for trade in the East Indies. In this enterprise nearly all his money was invested, and the ships with their cargoes were seized by the Dutch in 1641. The Earl of Bridgewater declined to assist Courteen further; the disturbed state of the government rendered any help from that quarter out of the question; and in 1643 bankruptcy followed.

Courteen's landed estates were alienated to his brother-in-law, the Earl of Kent, and Courteen retired to Italy. His wife endeavoured in vain to come to terms with Peter Boudean, and finally joined her husband, who died intestate at Florence in 1655. Two children, William and Katharine, survived him. The former endeavoured to recover some of his father's property, and in 1660 Charles II granted to George Carew, who had been associated in business with Sir William Courteen, power to administer the estates of Sir William and his son. Proceedings were also begun in Holland against the Dutch East India Company for compensation for the ships lost in 1641; the English courts of law and parliament were constantly petitioned for redress until the end of the century, but the greater part of the enormous wealth of Sir William Courteen never reached his descendants. In August 1660 the privy council heard evidence in support of the claims of Courteen's grandson to the ownership of the Barbadoes, but did not deem the proof sufficient. In 1677 petitions to the council and parliament rehearsed the loans of Courteen and Sir Paul Pindar to Charles I, but repayment was never ordered. George Carew issued many tracts on the subject, but public interest was not excited.

Famed physician and collector Hans Sloane acquired (by bequest, conditional on paying of certain debts) Courteen's grandson's (also William 1642–1702) cabinet of curiosities in 1702 and later donated much of it to the British government.

== Arm ==
Coat of arms of Courteen of Aldington
Notes No royal licence can be found, so these the arms of Williams of Edwinsford are quartered as a standard quartering through an heiress. Crest A demi talbot sable. Escutcheon Or, a talbot passant Sable.

== See also ==
- Courteen association
