= Forge Mill Lake =

Lake and nature reserve in West Midlands, England

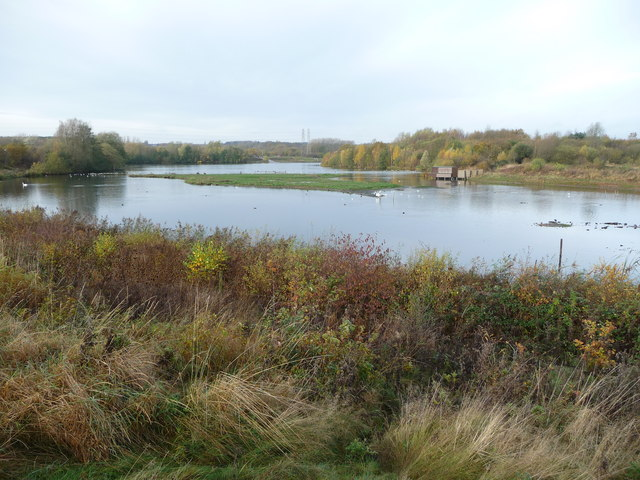
- Looking west along the lake

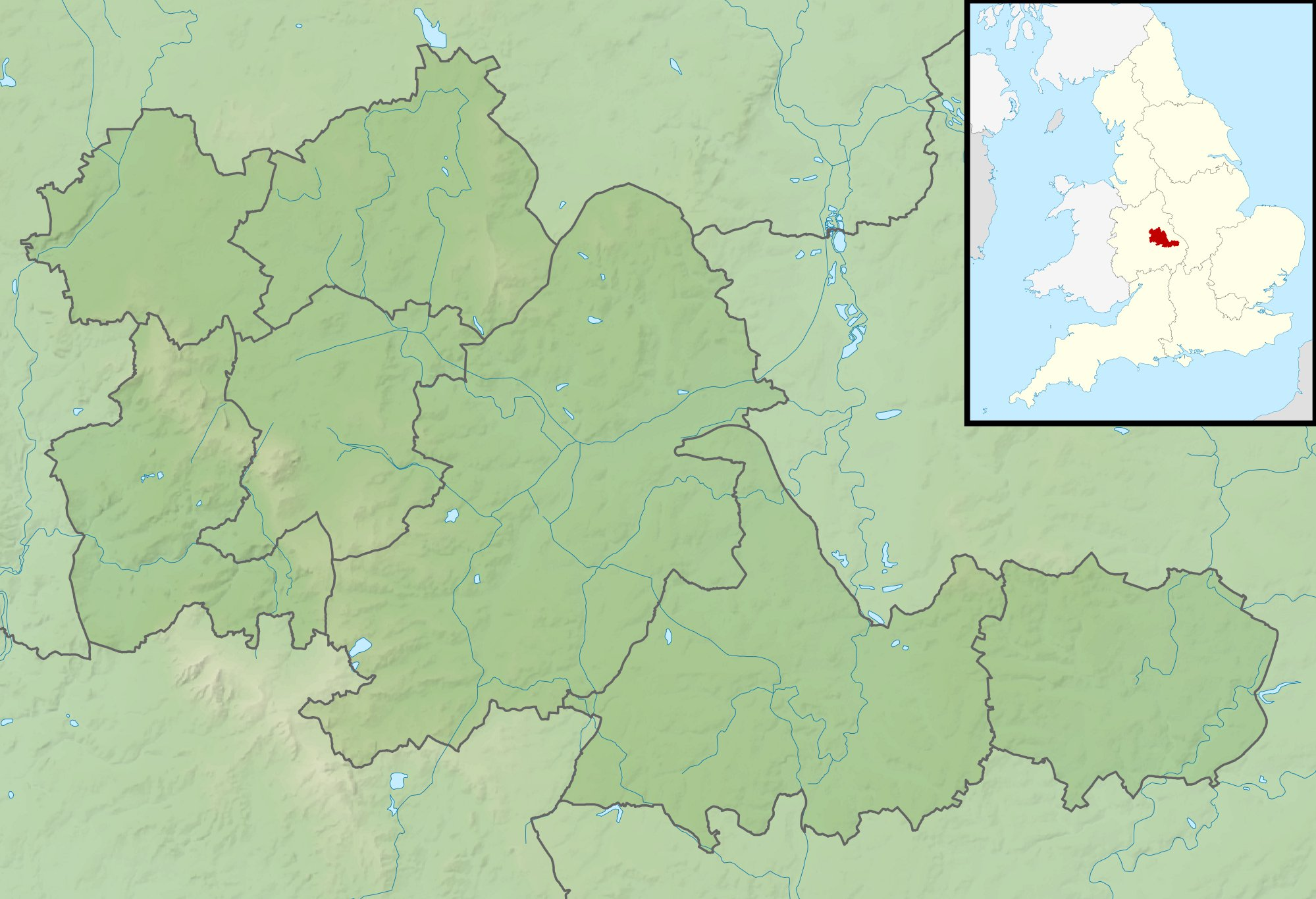
- Location within West Midlands county
- Location: Sandwell Valley
- OS grid: SP 031 926
- Coordinates: 52.5305°N 1.9551°W
- Area: 63 hectares (160 acres)
- Operator: Sandwell Metropolitan Borough Council
- Designation: Local nature reserve

Forge Mill Lake is a local nature reserve in Sandwell Valley, near West Bromwich in West Midlands, England. It is within Sandwell Valley Country Park.

== Description ==
The site, area 63 hectares (160 acres), is owned and managed by Sandwell Metropolitan Borough Council, and was declared a local nature reserve (LNR) in 1991. Part of the site, including one of the two islands in the lake, is managed by the RSPB as part of the adjacent Sandwell Valley RSPB reserve.

The lake is alongside the River Tame. There is a footpath around the lake; wildflower meadows and woodland plantations are linked to it by pathways, a cycleway and bridleway. There is a visitor centre at Forge Mill Farm.

Wildfowl and other species can be seen on the lake; in winter, wigeon, snipe, water rail and other rarer birds are there. In spring and autumn, migrant birds pass through and rarities may be seen.

The lake itself, also known as Sandwell Valley Storage Lake, was completed in 1981 as part of flood alleviation measures on the adjacent river; its capacity is 498,000 m^{3} (651,000 cu yd).

As of 2020, the lake is being remodelled and its capacity increased as part of the "Perry Barr and Witton flood risk management scheme".
