= Sot's Hole =

Sot's Hole may refer to:

- Metheringham, a village and civil parish in Lincolnshire, England
- Sot's Hole Local Nature Reserve, in the Sandwell Valley in the West Midlands of England
