= Sandwell Valley =

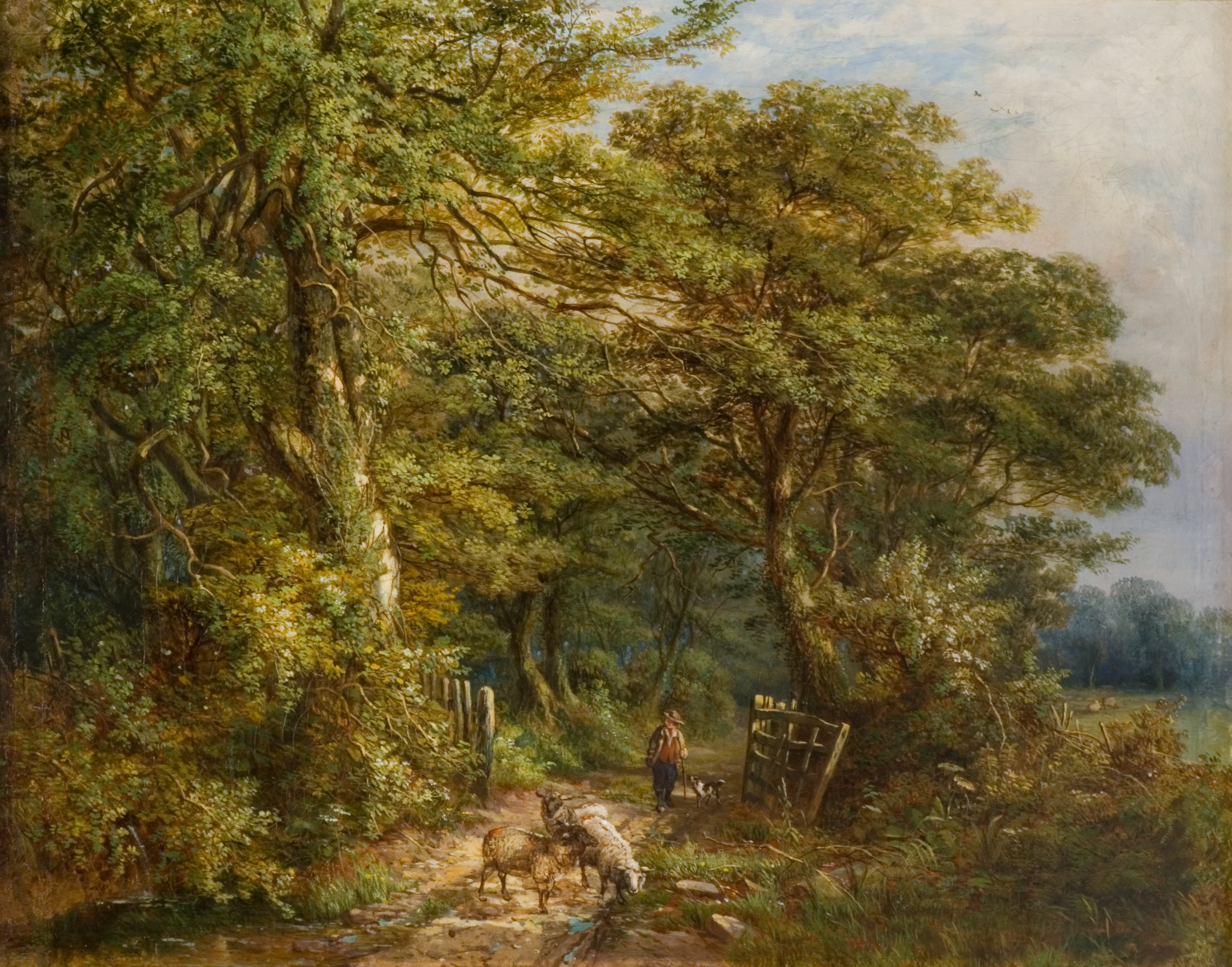
A Lane at Hamstead, Staffordshire by William Ellis (1747–1810), now in the Garman Ryan Collection at The New Art Gallery Walsall, shows the area in more rural times

Sandwell Valley is an area of green belt in the county of West Midlands, England, on the border of Birmingham and West Bromwich, with Walsall at its northern end.

It is a valley on the River Tame of which 720 hectares (1,800 acres) are owned by Sandwell Metropolitan Borough Council, with the RSPB leasing 25 acres as Sandwell Valley RSPB reserve. Within this large area, is the 270 hectares (670 acres) Sandwell Valley Country Park, which contains two visitor centres, Forge Mill Farm and Sandwell Park Farm, the former using modern farming techniques, the latter with a walled kitchen garden and rare breeds of farm animals, one of 16 farm parks approved nationally by the Rare Breeds Survival Trust.

Sot's Hole is one of three Local Nature Reserves in the Country Park, and lies on the edge of the site on Dagger Lane/Church Vale, West Bromwich. In an effort to protect and restore the reserve, a group of local people joined in November 2005 and formed the Friends of Sot's Hole.

The earliest evidence of people in Sandwell Valley is in the form of flint tools from the Mesolithic period, but evidence of later periods is also present in the landscape, including the site of Sandwell Hall (home of the Earls of Dartmouth) and Sandwell Priory ruins (still evident today). Exhibitions at Sandwell Park Farm tell the story of the people who lived here.

The M5 motorway bisects the Country Park, with the intersection between it and the M6 (considered Junction 8 of the M6) at the northern end, and junction 1 of the M5 to the south. The latter junction surrounds a surviving gatehouse from the hall. The Birmingham-Walsall Line, part of the former Grand Junction Railway, opened in 1837, runs through the northern end of the valley, with Hamstead railway station being the nearest. The former Newton Road railway station having closed some years ago.

The highest point of Sandwell Valley is in Birmingham and is known as Hill Top, where the remains of a World War II gun emplacement can still be found there.

The Country Park's fauna and flora are studied by the Sandwell Valley Naturalists' Club (SandNats).

Every Saturday morning at 9.00am, the country park hosts a parkrun, a free, weekly timed 5 km run.

Adjacent areas include Great Barr, Hamstead and Handsworth Wood.

== Coordinates ==
Point	Coordinates (links to map & photo sources)	Notes
M5/M6 junction	52.548°N 1.966°W	
Newton Road railway station	52.5400°N 1.9641°W	
Railway crosses river	52.536045°N 1.957101°W	
Forge Mill Farm	52.533180°N 1.959515°W	
RSPB Visitors' Centre	52.533114°N 1.949998°W	
Hamstead railway station	52.530°N 1.928°W	
Sot's Hole NR	52.529185°N 1.983494°W	
Sandwell Park Farm	52.521183°N 1.972786°W	
Gun emplacement	52.519591°N 1.951500°W	
M5 junction 1	52.512°N 1.975°W	
Gatehouse	52.511601°N 1.974109°W	
Sandwell Priory	52.5198°N 1.9648°W	
