= Sandwell Valley RSPB reserve =

Nature reserve in the United Kingdom

RSPB Sandwell Valley
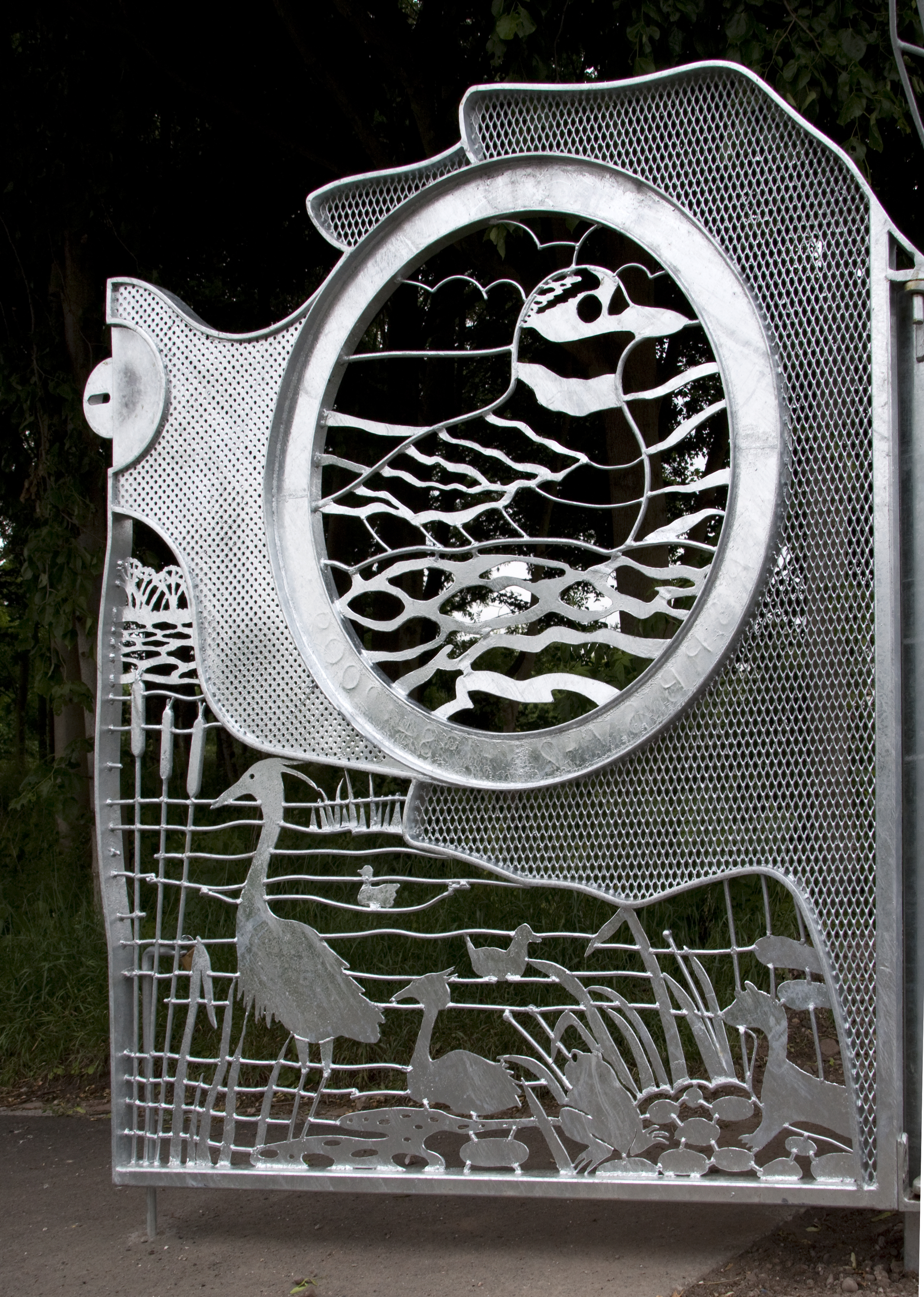
- Gate by Tim Tolkien, featuring little ringed plover, grey heron and other species.
- Interactive map of RSPB Sandwell Valley
- Location: Sandwell, West Midlands, England
- Coordinates: 52.5331°N 1.9500°W (Visitor Centre)
- Operator: RSPB
- Website: rspb.org.uk/days-out/reserves/sandwell-valley

Sandwell Valley RSPB reserve (grid reference SP017913) is a nature reserve, run by the RSPB, in Sandwell Valley, to the north of West Bromwich, in the Sandwell borough of West Midlands in England. It is adjacent to, and shares its main lake with, Sandwell Valley Country Park and near the settlement of Hamstead.

In March 2010 the visitor centre was destroyed in an arson attack. A new centre has replaced it.

== Location ==
The reserve is located around the eastern and northern edges of the Forge Mill Lake, a storm water retention basin within a meander of the River Tame. The reserve is surrounded by the West Midlands conurbation and is close to the edges of Birmingham and Walsall, as well as West Bromwich. It is close to the M5 motorway, M6 motorway and the A34 road.

There is a vehicle access to the study centre from Tanhouse Avenue. It can also be accessed via the network of paths crossing Sandwell Valley - with particular ease from the car park serving Forge Mill Farm, on Park Lane.

== Features ==
The reserve is of particular importance for its educational work with visiting school parties.

A bird hide, on stilts in the lake and reached by a drawbridge, allows close views of birds on the lake, its shores, and its islands - one of which has been situated directly in front of the hide. There are also a number of substantial screens, which are available at all times and afford good views of birds on the wetland areas surrounding the lake.

The site, formerly a landfill, has been carefully planted with a wide range of native trees and shrubs, to provide a rich and diverse habitat.

The reserve has a pair of entrance gates by the artist Tim Tolkien. The former visitor centre had a carpet designed for the reserve by the artist Greg Poole, but this was lost in the 2010 fire.

== Species ==
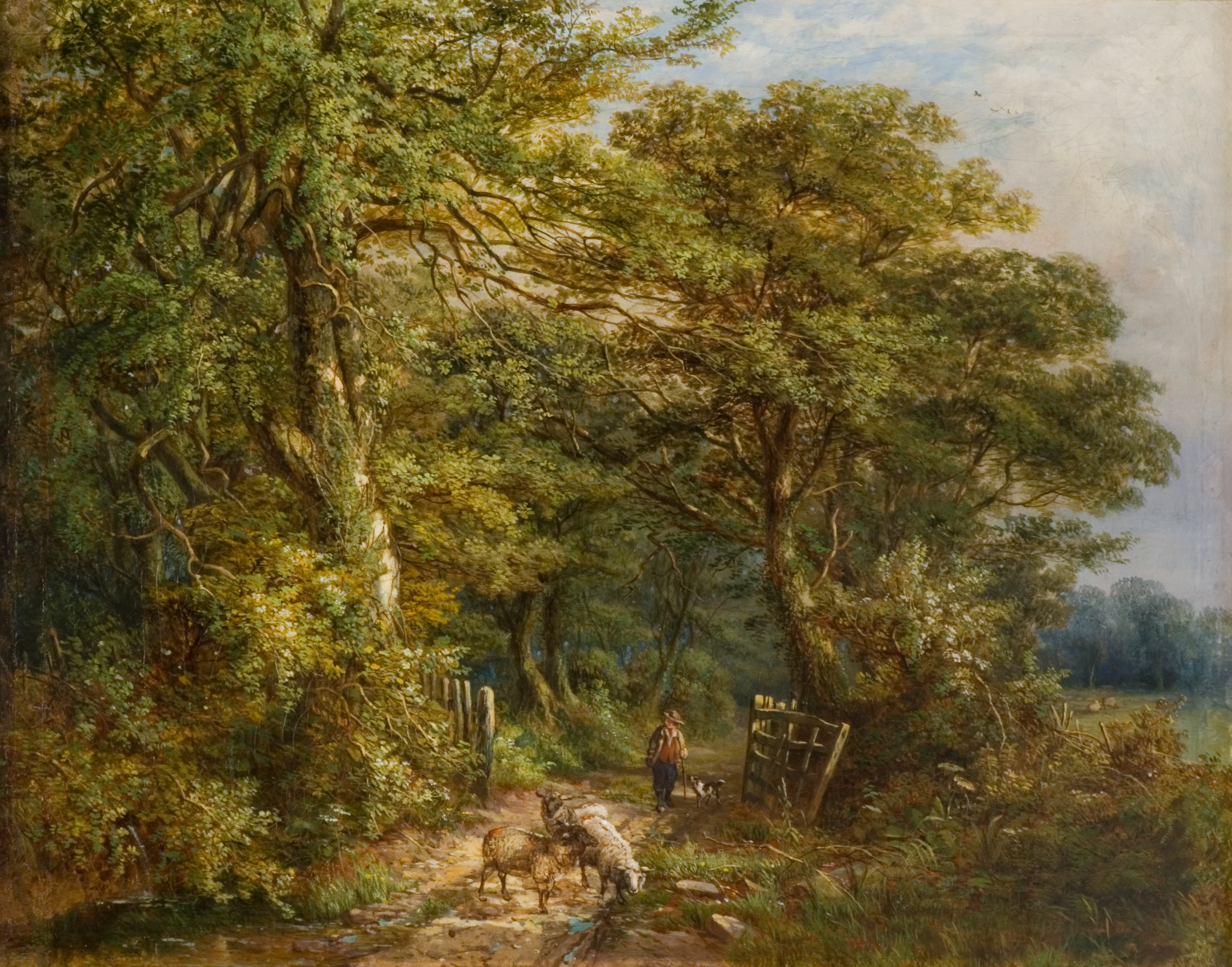
A Lane at Hamstead, Staffordshire by William Ellis (1747-1810), now in the Garman Ryan Collection at The New Art Gallery Walsall shows the area in more rural times

The lake and smaller pools are home to a wide range of water fowl and also play host to migrating birds. Among the species that attract birdwatchers to the hide are the goosander, lapwings, common snipe, little ringed plover and whitethroat.

The growing bio-diversity of the slopes attracts a very large range of wildlife, and therefore a number of raptors, including buzzards.

Other birds that have been seen on the reserve include Cetti's warbler, and a female smew. Common and Mediterranean gulls are seen annually on the reserve. Black-tailed godwits are seen every few years on the reserve.

The main summer breeding birds seen on the reserve include common tern, little ringed plover, oystercatcher and many more. Summer warblers seen on the reserve include sedge warbler, reed warbler, whitethroat, chiffchaff, willow warbler and grasshopper warbler. Coot are a common breeder on the reserve but are often less successful.

Winter bird species seen include wigeon, teal, common snipe, jack snipe, goosander, and goldeneye. Water rail are seen more regularly in the winter with numbers going up to four individuals in 2013.

Some of the reserves star species are the lapwings that breed there annually, but again like the coot, they are less successful mainly due to predation. Ringed-necked parakeets are regularly seen on the reserve.

== Gallery ==
Main features of the Sandwell Valley RSPB Nature Centre

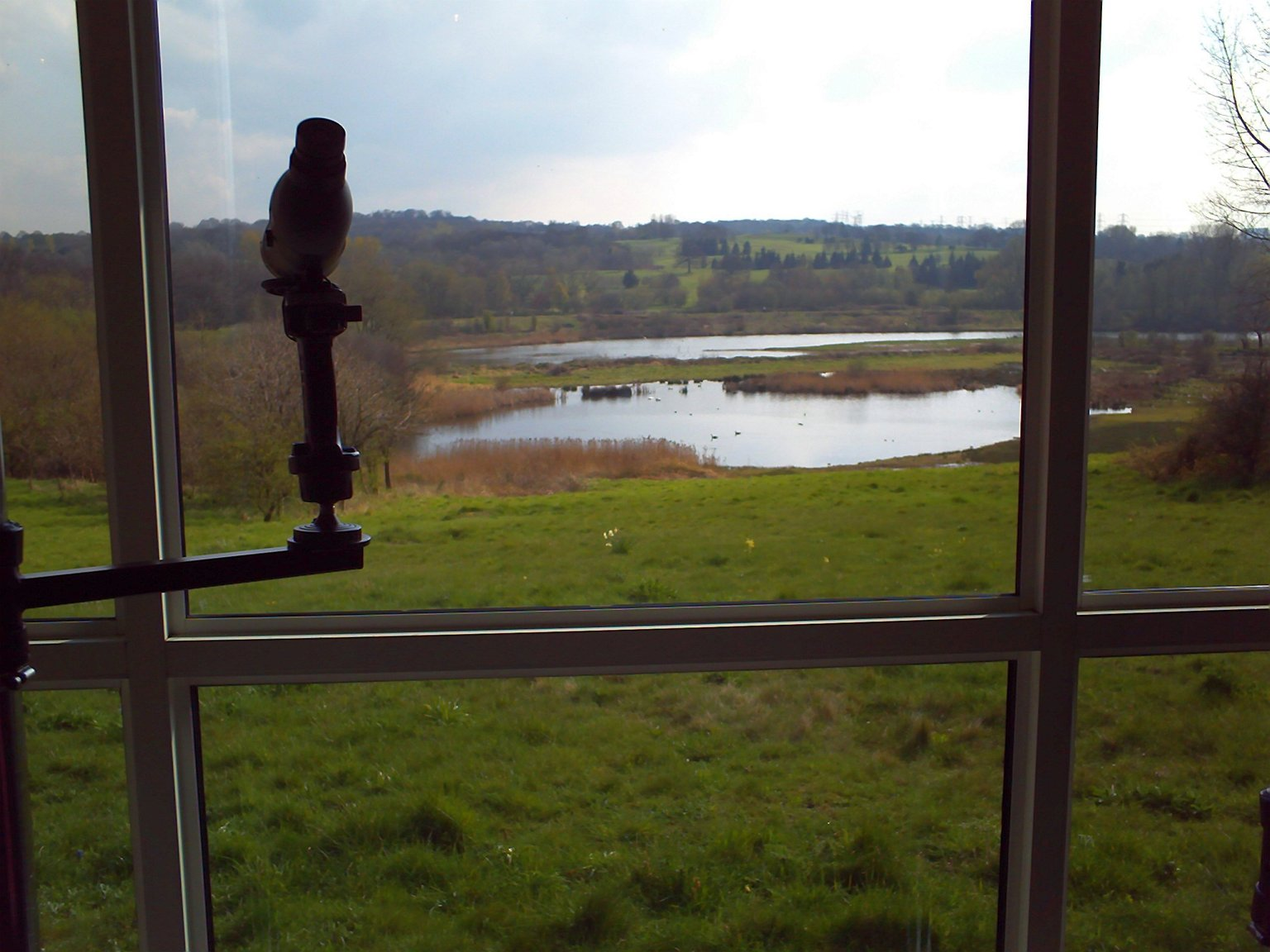
View through the main window of the former visitor centre, which was equipped with telescopes for public use.

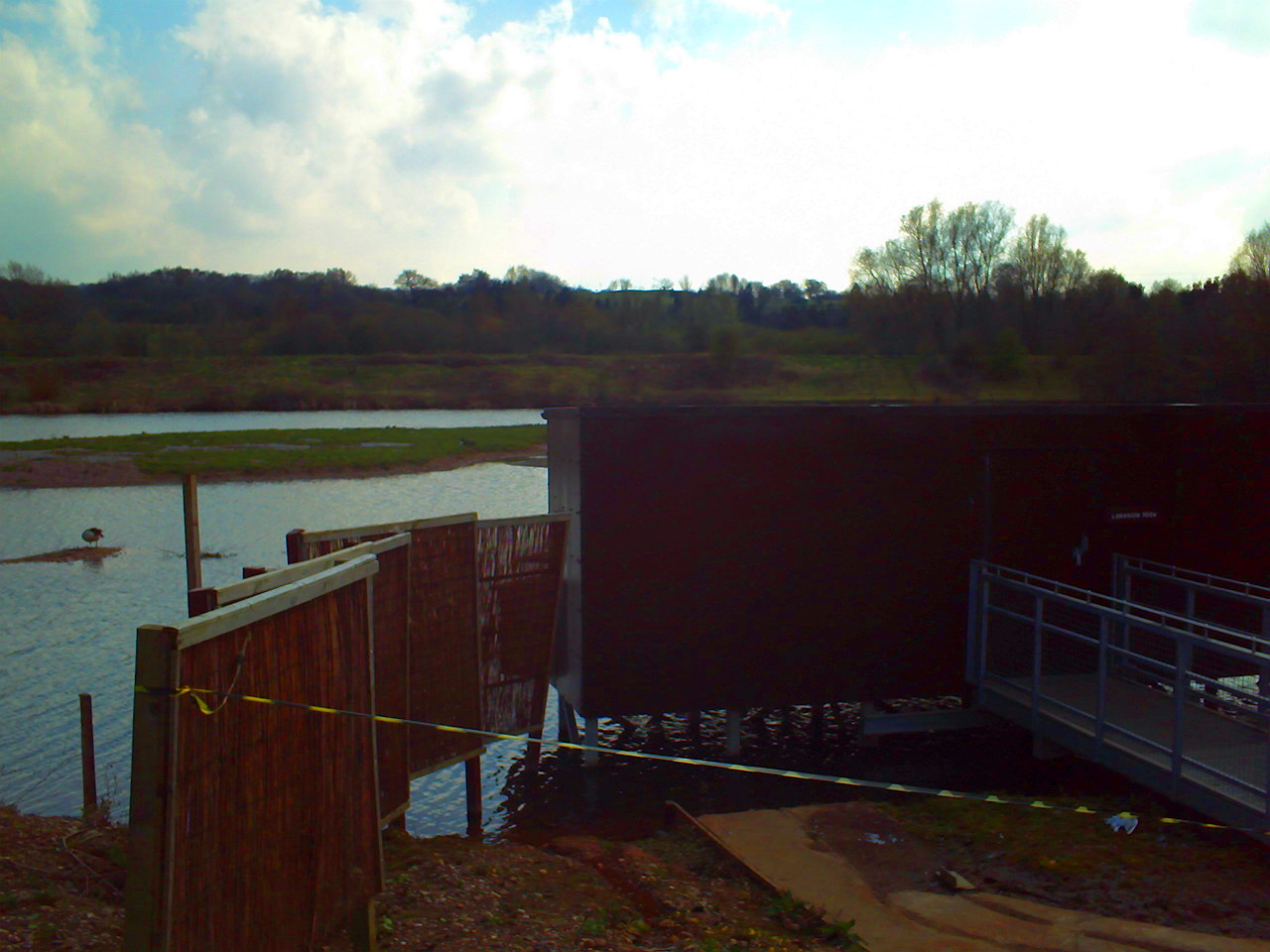
The lakeside hide, which gives an excellent view of the lake, especially the central island, which is visited by a vast range of species.

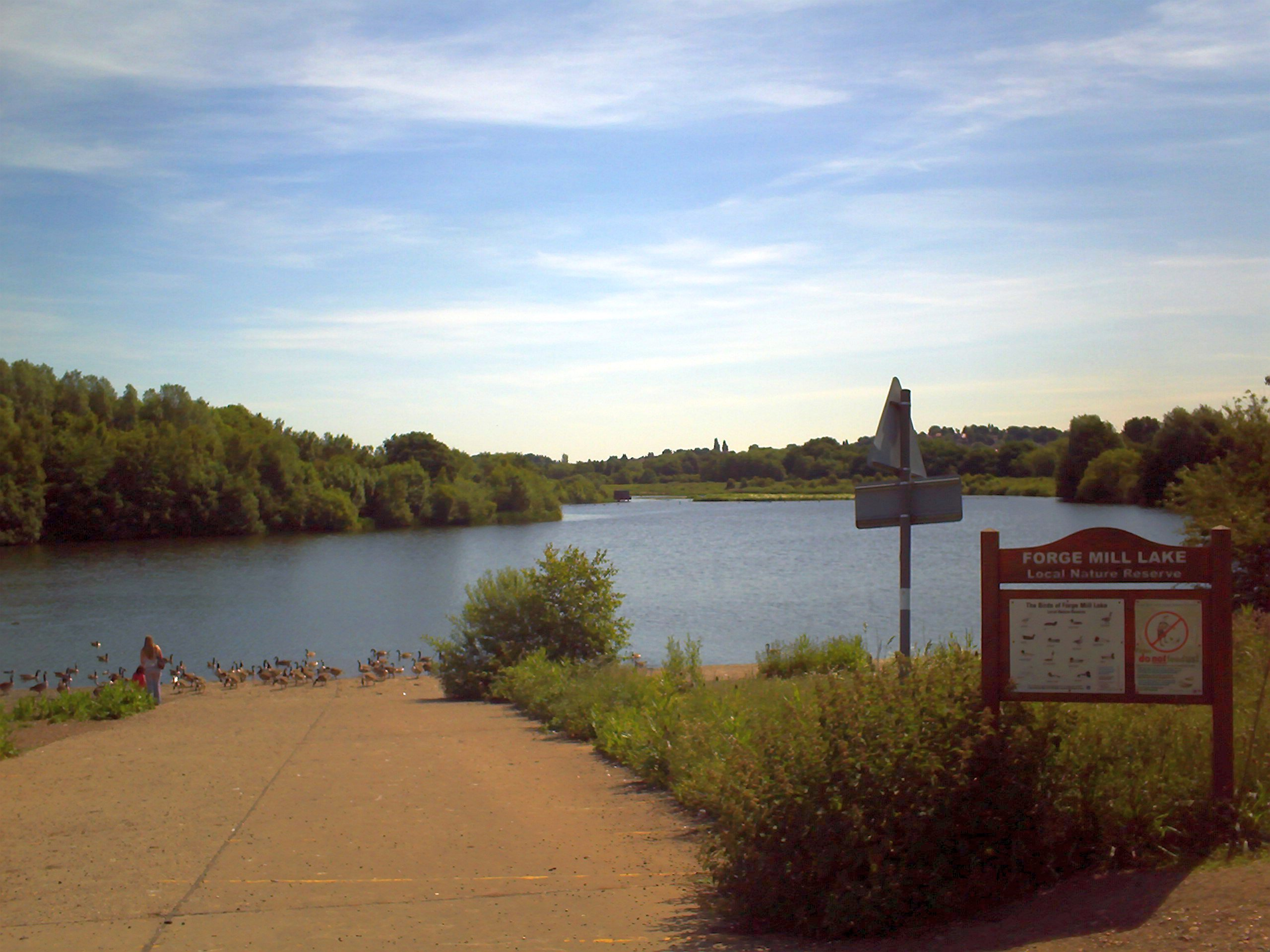
Forge Mill Lake, which is fed by the River Tame. The RSPB reserve is on the far side, and the bird hide is just visible, in the centre of the photograph.
