= Hamstead Hall Academy =

Location
- Craythorne Avenue; Handsworth Wood; Birmingham, West Midlands, B20 1HN; England; 52.5309°N 1.941°W

Information
- Type: Academy
- Local authority: Birmingham City Council
- Department for Education URN: 139746 Tables
- Ofsted: Reports
- Staff: 10000
- Gender: Mixed
- Age: 11 to 18
- Enrolment: 1,076 as of March 2016
- Website: hamsteadhall.com

Hamstead Hall Academy is a mixed secondary school and sixth form located in the Handsworth Wood area of Birmingham, in the West Midlands of England. The school is situated next to the Sandwell Valley RSPB reserve.

Previously a foundation school administered by Birmingham City Council, Hamstead Hall converted to academy status in June 2013. However the school continues to coordinate with Birmingham City Council for admissions.

Hamstead Hall Academy offers GCSEs and BTECs as programmes of study for pupils, while students in the sixth form have the option to study from a range of A-levels and further BTECs.

== Hamstead Hall ==
Hamstead Hall was the home of Scottish businessman George Kynoch. In 1959 a Romano-British pottery kiln was discovered in the gardens. Objects now form exhibits in Birmingham Museum.
