= Greg Poole =

English painter

- Born: 26 October 1960; Bristol
- Died: 28 December 2018 (aged 58)
- Alma mater: Manchester Metropolitan University
- Occupation: Painter
- Website: www.gregpoole.co.uk

Gregory Poole (1960–2018) was a British painter, graphic artist and printmaker, known for his wildlife subjects, especially birds.

Poole was born in Bristol, England, on 26 October 1960, to May (née Rex), a teaching assistant, and John Poole, a gas fitter. As a youth, he was a bird watcher and trained as a bird ringer. He was educated at Cotham Grammar School and then studied zoology at Cardiff University. During field work in Canada, he developed the desire to use art to express his feelings about nature. After a period as a volunteer warden at Bardsey Bird and Field Observatory, he undertook a foundation course at Manchester Polytechnic in order to develop his skills as an artist.

He designed a carpet, depicting several examples of the food chain, for the visitor centre at RSPB Sandwell Valley. The carpet was lost in March 2010, when the building was destroyed by arson. He also designed graphic interpretation panels for a number of public open spaces. For the latter he worked digitally, using a graphics tablet.

He exhibited with the Society of Wildlife Artists in 1991 and was a member from 1993. He undertook a number of residencies at the gallery Nature in Art, whose collection includes some of his work. He served three terms on the Society's governing council. He received the 2011 Birdscapes Gallery Printmaker's prize, and the 2015 RSPB Art Award. He also taught classes in drawing.

He cited the artists Nicola Henley and Kim Atkinson as early influences, and later collaborated with David Measures on shared canvasses.

Poole, who was based in Bristol, died on 28 December 2018 after experiencing complications following a heart attack, and is survived by his partner Susan and a brother.

== Publications ==
- La Riviera (in French). Gallimard. 1999. ISBN 978-2070528585.
