= Handsworth Wood =

Suburb of Birmingham in West Midlands, England

Coordinates: 52.512°N 1.918°W

- Location within the West Midlands
- Population: 27,749 (2011)
  - Density: 37.4 per ha
- OS grid reference: SP055905
- Metropolitan borough: Birmingham
- Metropolitan county: West Midlands
- Region: West Midlands
- Country: England
- Sovereign state: United Kingdom
- Post town: Birmingham
- Postcode district: B20
- Dialling code: 0121
- Police: West Midlands
- Fire: West Midlands
- Ambulance: West Midlands
- UK Parliament: Birmingham Perry Barr

Handsworth Wood is a suburb and electoral ward of Birmingham in the West Midlands county, England.

Handsworth Wood is regarded as one of the premier residential areas in Birmingham, due to the significant number of imposing Victorian detached and semi-detached houses. Also the area is highly sought after due to the access to parks such as Handsworth Park, golf clubs and the open spaces of Sandwell Valley Country Park. Handsworth Wood is regarded by estate agents as upmarket in comparison to the neighbouring district of Handsworth.

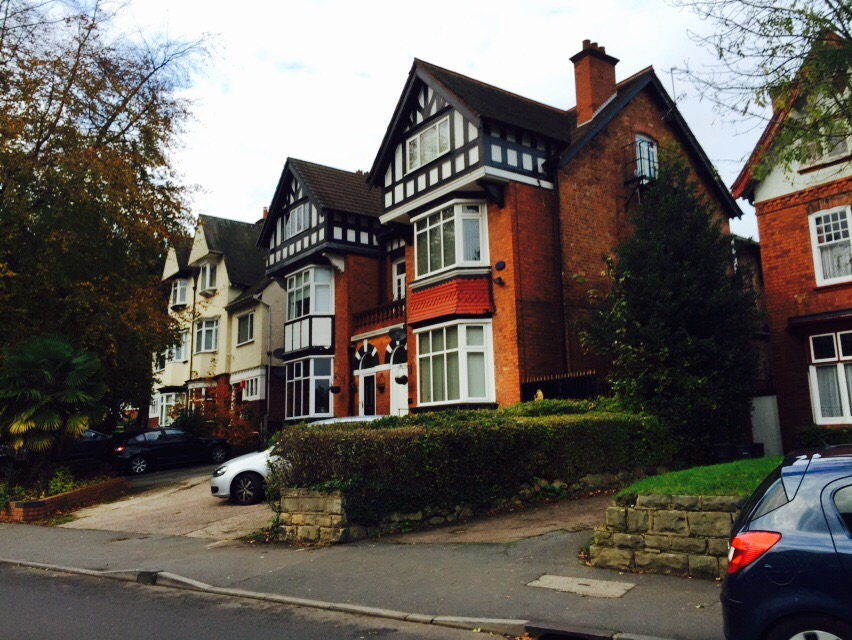
Typical Victorian houses in Handsworth Wood

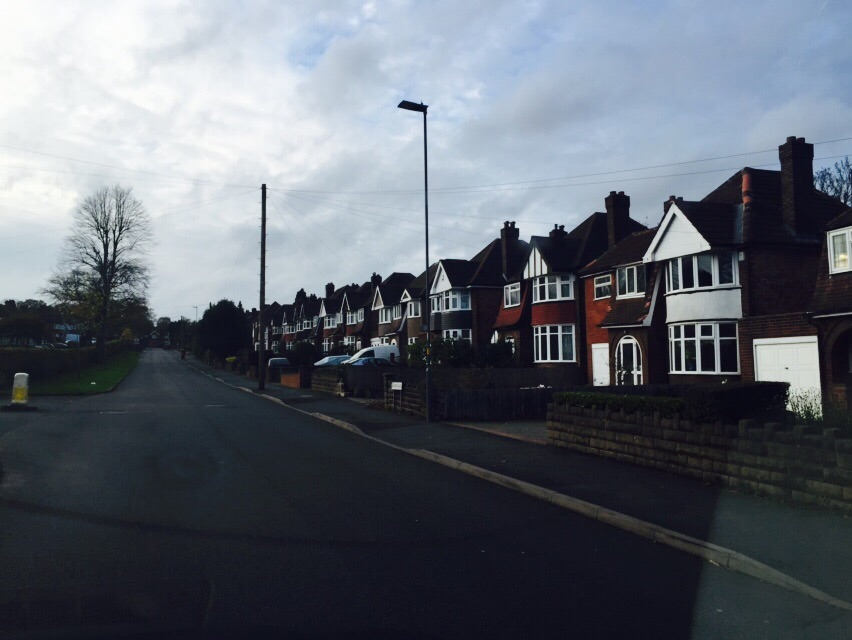
Typical street in Handsworth Wood

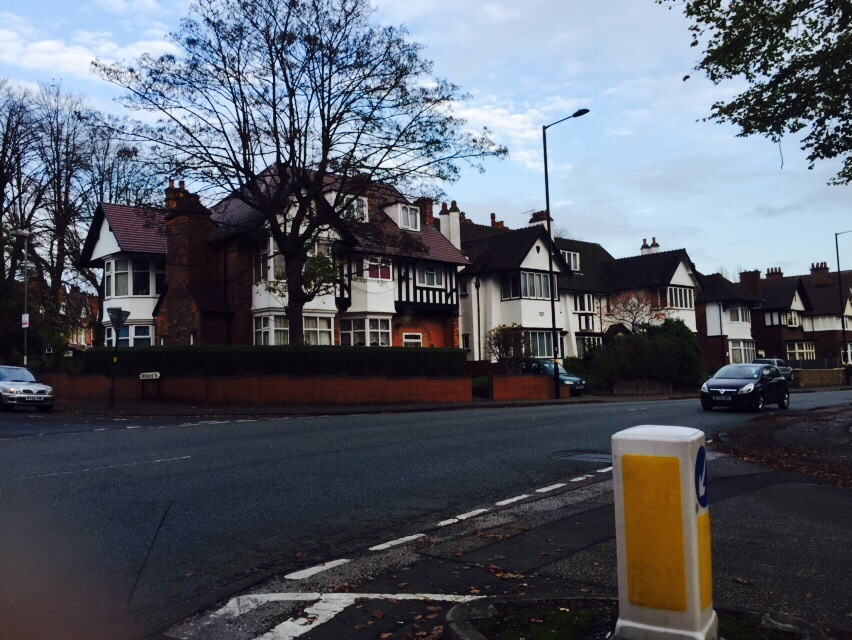
Semi-detached homes in Handsworth Wood

== History ==
Handsworth Wood was the woodland belonging to the manor of Handsworth and lay in the north of the manor. It is the 'woodland half a league long & the same wide' which is cited in the Domesday Book in 1086.

By the end of the 19th century there was only scattered building development in this rural area, some of it very large houses for the wealthy. Beyond Friary Road, Handsworth Wood Road was still farmland. It was between the two World Wars and up to the 1950s that Handsworth Wood was developed largely with private housing. It is an area that has maintained its middle-class status to the present.

The area had its own railway station until 1941 known as Handsworth Wood railway station. The station site lies in a cutting through Handsworth Park, adjacent to St Mary's Church.

Birmingham historian Carl Chinn noted that during World War II the boundary between Handsworth and Handsworth Wood marked the line between being safe and unsafe from bombing, with Handsworth Wood being an official evacuation zone due to its very country like, undeveloped landscape. Due to the affluent residents of the area properties are larger than usual sizes meaning Handsworth Wood was ideal for evacuees etc.

Mr Hudson, the singer/songwriter, was born in Handsworth Wood.

James Watt, the engineer/inventor, lived in Handsworth Wood.

Matthew Boulton also worked alongside James Watt, was born and raised in the area.

== Governance ==
Located within the metropolitan county of the West Midlands since 1 April 1974, under the Local Government Act 1972, it was historically a part of the county of Staffordshire. It is a Birmingham City Council electoral ward within the Council constituency of Perry Barr. The ward includes part of Handsworth and nearly all of Handsworth Wood, and was formerly known as Sandwell Ward.

As of 2026, the ward is represented by two Labour councillors on Birmingham City Council; Narinder Kooner and Randeep Kular.

== Demographics ==
Religion in Handsworth Wood (2021)
1. Christian (26.4%)
2. Sikh (24.8%)
3. Muslim (23.8%)
4. Hindu (5.90%)
5. Buddhist (0.90%)
6. Other (2.20%)
7. Irreligious (16.0%)

The 2001 census recorded that 25,276 people were living in the ward. It has a high percentage of ethnic minorities in the area with the figure being 67.1% (16,975) of the population being of an ethnic minority, as opposed to 29.6% for Birmingham in general, with over 50% of residents being British Indian. The ethnic groups recorded were:

- White British – 7,427
- South Asian – 12,052
- Black British – 4,100
- Mixed Race – 877

== Education ==
The primary schools in the area include Cherry Orchard Primary School, St Teresa's Catholic Primary School and Grestone Primary School.

The secondary schools in the area include Hamstead Hall Academy and King Edward VI Handsworth Wood Girls' Academy.

It is home to 'Hamstead Campus' a privately owned student accommodation.

Nearby to Handsworth Wood are the grammar schools of King Edward VI Handsworth girl's grammar school and Handsworth Grammar School.

== Sporting facilities ==
Handsworth Wood is home to numerous sports facilities. Handsworth Wood Bowling Club is located on Devonshire Road. The Bridge Trust Cricket Club is on Romilly Avenue. Hamstead Diamonds Tennis Club is located on Craythorne Road. The highly regarded Handsworth Golf Club is also located here with the entrance on Sunningdale Close (off Craythorne Road).

== Places of interest ==
Local amenities include: St Mary's Church and Handsworth Park. The Anchorage is a grade II* listed building,

== Transport ==
The area is well served by bus routes 16, 11C and the 101. The nearest railway station is Hamstead railway station.

== See also ==
- Browns Green
- Hamstead
- Great Barr
