= Sot's Hole Local Nature Reserve =

Nature reserve in West Bromwich, UK

Sot's Hole
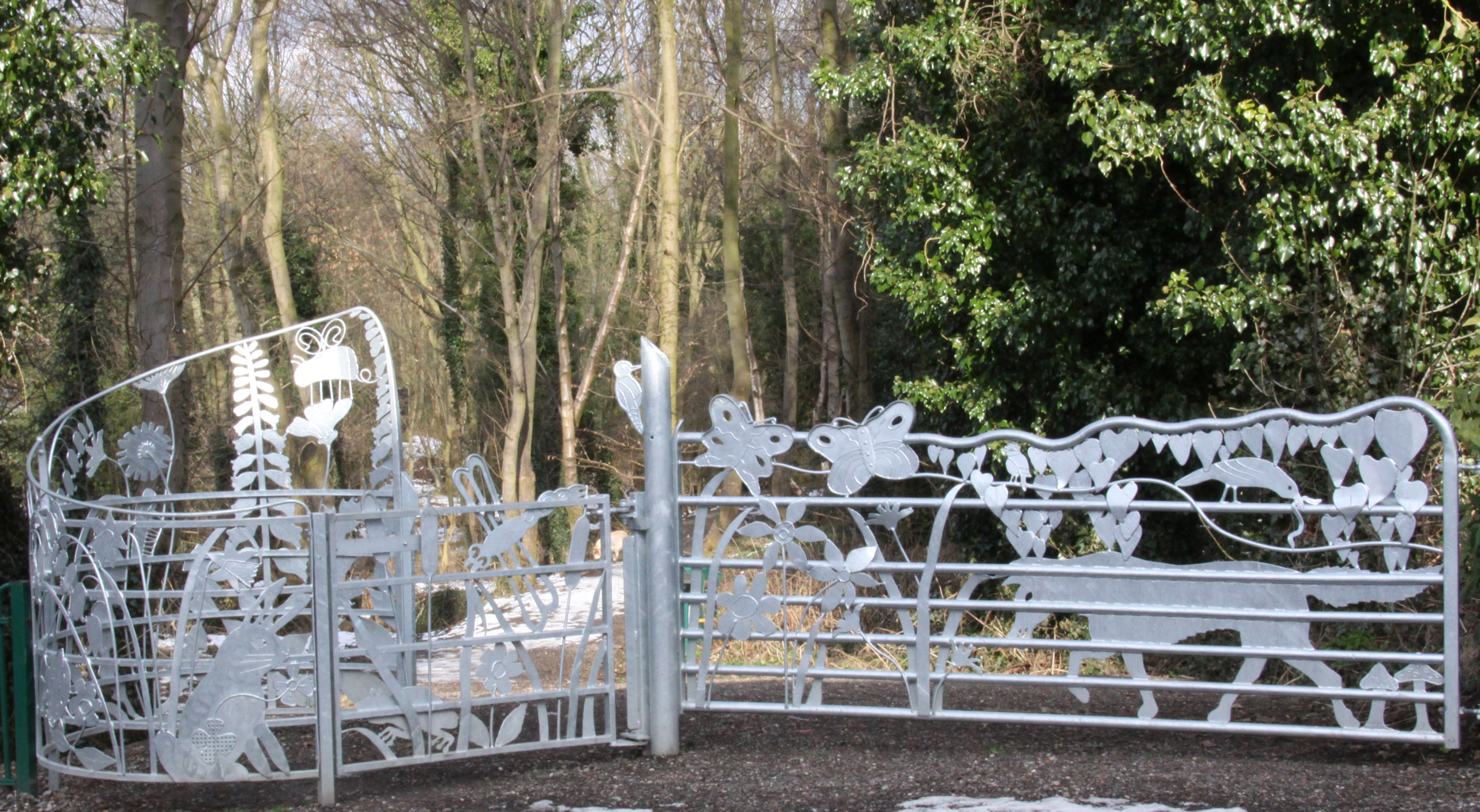
- Gate to the nature reserve, by Tim Tolkien

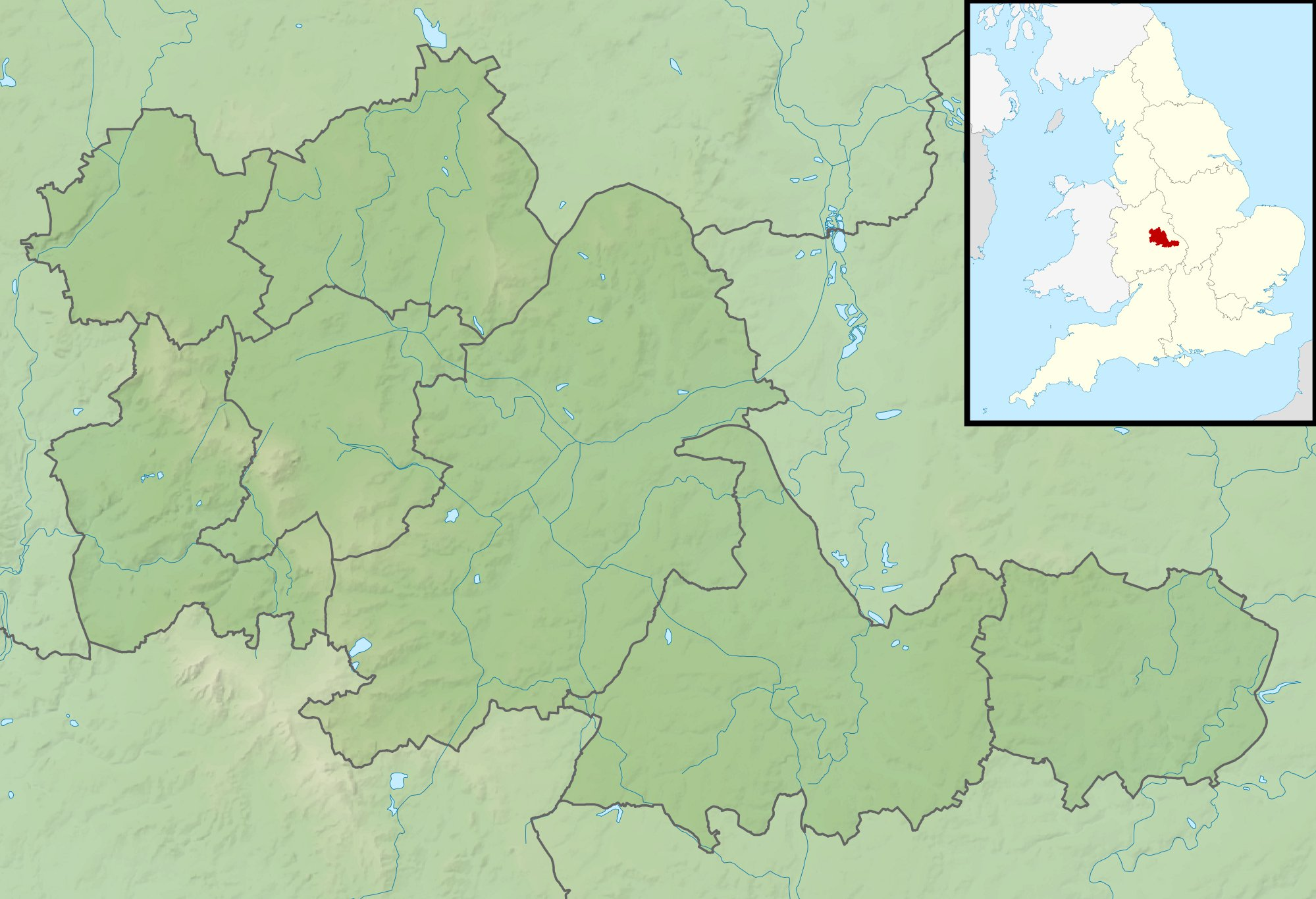
- Location within West Midlands county
- Location: Sandwell Valley
- OS grid: SP 012 923
- Coordinates: 52°31′44.5″N 1°59′01.1″W
- Area: 5.5 hectares (14 acres)
- Operator: Sandwell Metropolitan Borough Council
- Designation: Local nature reserve
- Website: www.sotshole.co.uk/index.html

Sot's Hole is a local nature reserve in West Midlands, England. It is on the west side of Sandwell Valley, and north-east of West Bromwich.

== Description ==
The site, area 5.5 hectares (14 acres) is owned and managed by Sandwell Metropolitan Borough Council, and was declared a local nature reserve in 1996.

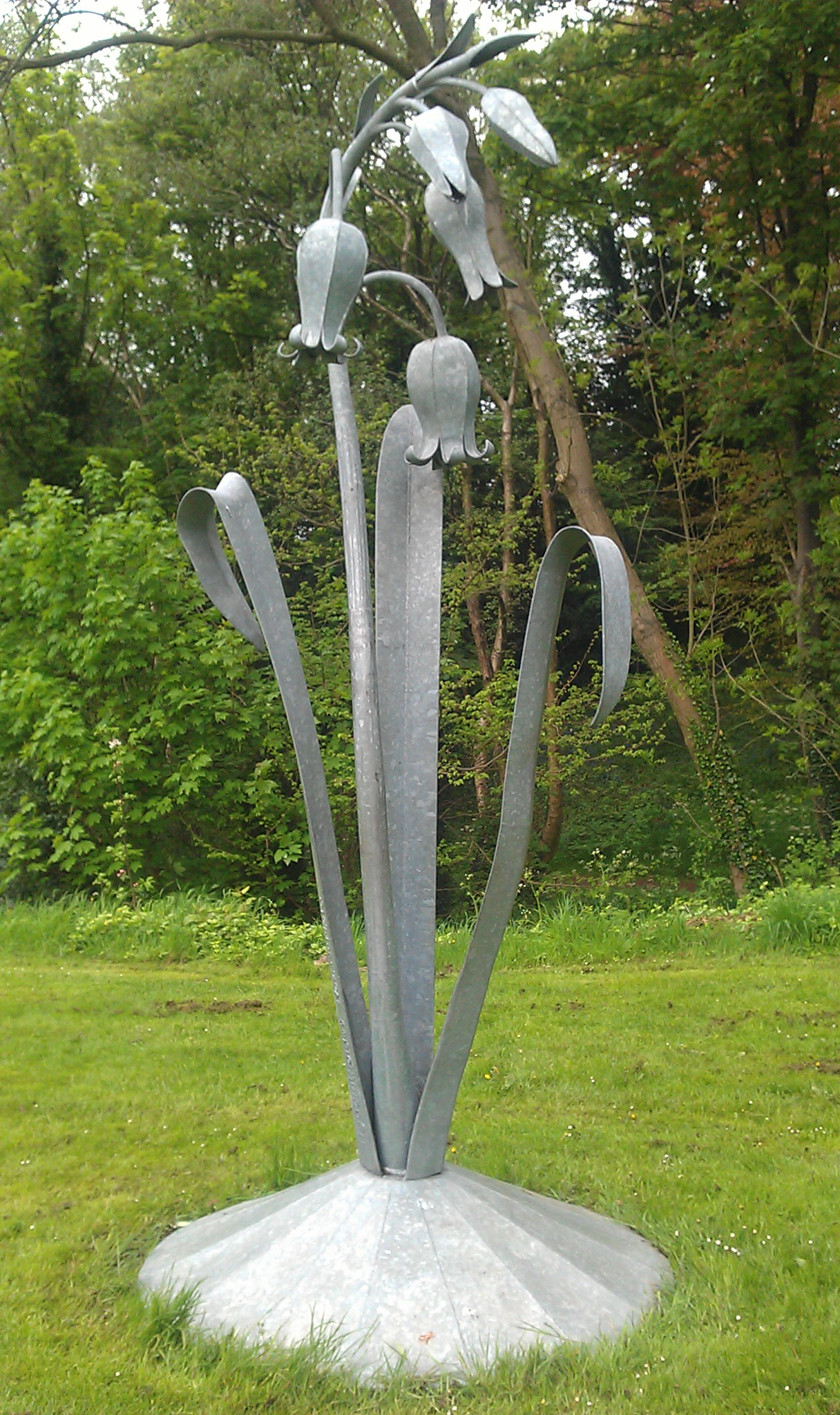
Bluebell sculpture, by Tim Tolkien

The main entrance is on Church Vale, West Bromwich. A surfaced path leads through the reserve, linking to paths leading to Sandwell Valley Country Park. There is a picnic site.

The reserve is situated on a geological fault line, so that the terrain has steep sides and has remained undeveloped. There are woods, in both damp and dry conditions; there is a small stream and areas of marsh. Some of the woodland is described as semi-ancient woodland. The varied habitats are home to a range of plants, insects and birds; the marsh areas support plants such as water horsetail and marsh thistle.

The name Sot's Hole may relate to a pub in the 18th century, in Church Vale next to the site, of which the publican Richard Reeves was known to be an alcoholic; or to heavy drinkers at a nearby pub The Bear and Ragged Staff in the 18th century.

A gate to the woodland, designed by Tim Tolkien, was erected in 2008. Since the site is known particularly for bluebells in spring, there is a Bluebell sculpture, also by Tolkien.

=== Friends of Sot's Hole ===
The Friends of Sot's Hole was established in 2005. The work of the group includes raising public awareness of the nature reserve, planning and running events, and carrying out work on the site. To alleviate the danger of the ground drying out, tree felling has been carried out to open the canopy, and oak and hazel saplings have been planted.
