= King Edward VI Handsworth Wood Girls' Academy =

Location
- Church Lane, Handsworth Wood; Birmingham, West Midlands, B20 2HL; England; 52°30′50″N 1°55′45″W

Information
- Type: Academy
- Established: 1957
- Department for Education URN: 138937 Tables
- Ofsted: Reports
- Head teacher: Kiran Takhar
- Gender: Girls
- Age: 11 to 18
- Enrolment: just over 1000
- Website: Official website

King Edward VI Handsworth Wood Girls' Academy is a secondary school and sixth form located in Handsworth Wood, Birmingham, England. The building that the school currently occupies used to be known as Handsworth Wood Boys' School but it went through a change over ten years ago. The headteacher is Ms Kiran Takhar.

Originally known as Handsworth Wood Girls School, in November 2012 the school converted to academy status and was renamed Handsworth Wood Girls' Academy. In September 2018 the school joined the Foundation of the Schools of King Edward VI and was renamed King Edward VI Handsworth Wood Girls' Academy.
