= Sandwell Priory =

Ruined medieval Benedictine monastery, near West Bromwich, England

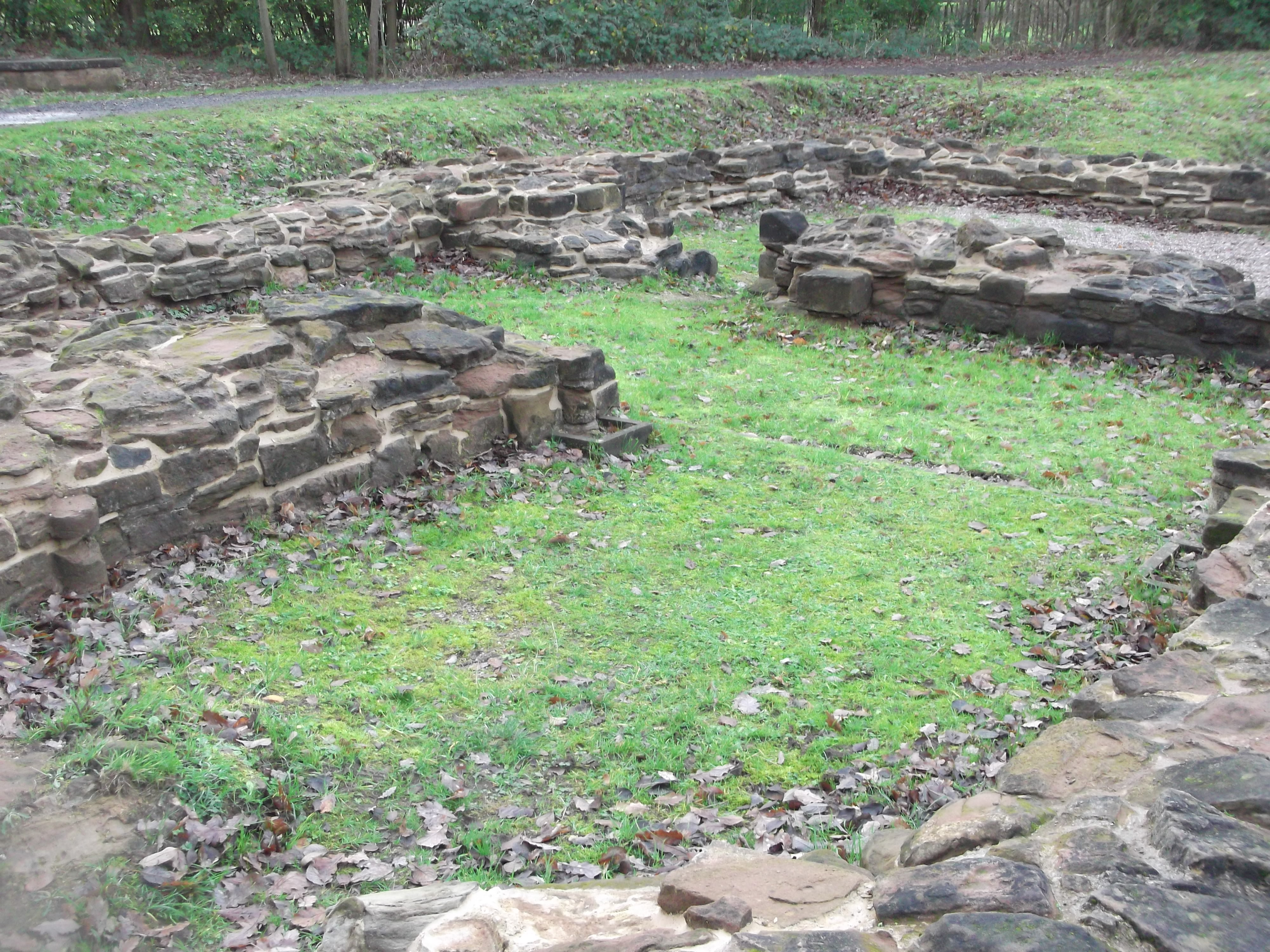
- Remains of the south chapels of the priory church.

- Location within West Midlands county
- Interactive map of Sandwell Priory

Monastery information
- Full name: The Priory of St Mary Magdalene of Sandwell
- Other name: Communis Sancte Marie Madalena de Sandwelle
- Order: Benedictine
- Established: c. 1190
- Disestablished: 1525
- Dedication: Mary Magdalene
- Diocese: Diocese of Coventry and Lichfield
- Controlled churches: Ellesborough; St Clement's (now All Saints') Church, West Bromwich (farmed from Worcester Priory after 1230)

People
- Founder: William Fitz Guy of West Bromwich
- Important associated figures: Nicholas Stevens, Abbot of Shrewsbury 1361—99, who attempted to annex the priory.; Bishop Roger Northburgh intervened in several disputes at the priory.; Bishop Robert de Stretton intervened in succession dispute.; Cardinal Thomas Wolsey, instigated dissolution of the priory, 1525.

Site
- Location: Sandwell Valley Country Park
- Coordinates: 52.5198°N 1.9648°W
- Visible remains: Low walls indicating the plan of the priory church.

Scheduled monument
- Official name: Sandwell Priory, a Benedictine monastery
- Designated: 2 July 1974
- Reference no.: 1017763
- Public access: yes

Sandwell Priory was a small medieval Benedictine monastery, near West Bromwich, then part of Staffordshire, England. It was founded in the late 12th century by a local landowner and was only modestly endowed. It had a fairly turbulent history and suffered considerably from mismanagement. It was dissolved in 1525 at the behest of Cardinal Wolsey – more than a decade before the main Dissolution of the Monasteries under Henry VIII.

== Foundation and dedication ==
The founder of Sandwell Priory was William, son of Guy de Offeni. Guy is known to have held West Bromwich around 1140 and was still alive in 1155. William was in charge by 1166 and was succeeded by his son, Richard, by 1212, although he may have survived a little longer.

William Fitz Guy was a principal tenant of Gervase de Paynel or Pagnell, who held the lordship of Dudley, his grandfather having married Beatrice, daughter of William Fitz-Ansculf the great territorial magnate who held much of the Midlands after the Norman Conquest. The promotion of monasticism was evidently a shared interest of lord and tenants. When Gervase founded Dudley Priory around the middle of the 12th century as a daughter house to Wenlock Priory, Guy de Offeni, his wife Christiana and son William donated to it the church at Wombourne for the salvation of their own souls.

It seems that a hermitage stood at the site, next to the well which gives the place its name, for some time before the priory itself was established. However, it was William who firmly established a monastery there: a house of Benedictine monks dedicated to St Mary Magdalene. The foundation date is generally given as 1190, although it could have been at least ten years earlier. Gervase's confirmation of William's grants is the main surviving evidence of the foundation and original endowments of Sandwell Priory.

== Endowments ==
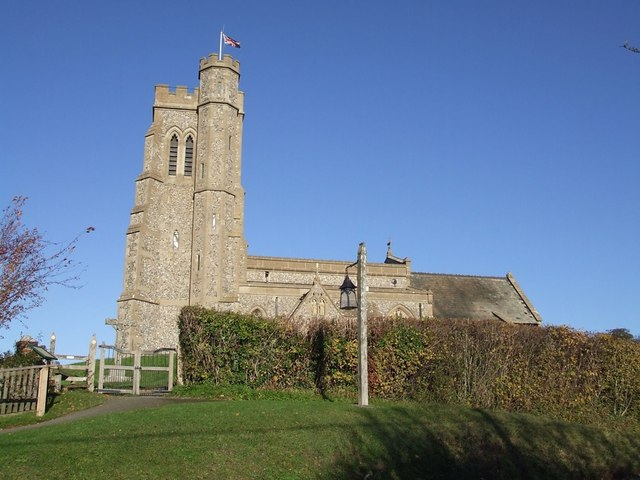
Ellesborough parish church, 15th century but with outer surface renewed.

William gave the monks land at the hermitage by the Sandwell to build a monastery – a clear indication of an earlier religious use for the site. The Victoria County History chapter on the priory seems to suggest that William also gave them his share of the church and a house at Ellesborough in Buckinghamshire, although quoting a provision to the effect that it belonged to the barony of Dudley. The relevant volume on Buckinghamshire confirms that the advowson was a grant from Gervase de Paynel, subscribing to William's project as William had subscribed to his.

There were other examples of monasteries replacing earlier hermitages – notably Haughmond Abbey in Shropshire, founded by the powerful FitzAlan family, also in the 12th century. However, William's family were only fairly minor landowners and, although he gave generously from what he had, the priory was not well-endowed at the outset. He was able donate some of his own tenants at West Bromwich. He also gave various geographically defined resources, not all of them now recognisable. There was Wavera in Handsworth – perhaps a water feature like a pond or weir; an assart or patch of farmland taken from the royal forest, called Ruworth; Duddesrudding; an area of land between Petulf Greene and the main road, apparently adjacent to the donation at Handsworth; a puteum – generally a well but possibly a pit - at West Bromwich; a watermill at Grete - by Greets Green, the other side of West Bromwich. William also granted the monks tithes of his own household's production – their breadmaking, hunting, mills, bread, ale, and ferculorum – of the very platters of food cooked in his kitchens table.; and wood for burning and building. A very valuable grant to the monks was pasture in all seasons and for whatever animals they wished in the manor of West Bromwich. The most important endowment was the block of land on the eastern side of West Bromwich parish, along the boundary with Handsworth, which formed the kernel of the priory's estates. The monks exercised manorial jurisdiction over the estates, with the right to hold a manorial court like other landowners.

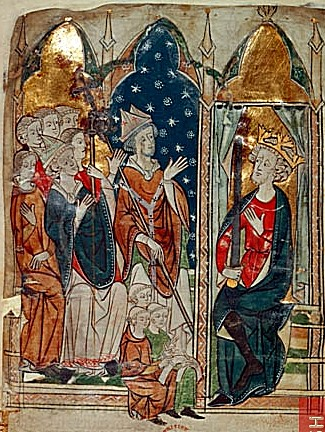
Edward I and clerics.

The endowments of the priory grew piecemeal over the years and successive priors fought legal battles to maintain its rights and privileges. There were major contests between the priors and the Parles family of Handsworth in the 13th century - initially over land but later over advowson of the church at Handsworth, which the priory claimed it shared with Lenton Priory, near Nottingham. The net result of the compromises reached was that the priory lost any share of the advowson but gained a messuage (a house with its adjoining land) worth a mark or 13s. 4d. a year in Birmingham and rent of 20s. a year from a mill in Hamstead, on the River Tame. Another long-running but more intermittent struggle confirmed the priory's advowson at Ellesborough against the challenges of local landowners. Around 1230 Worcester Priory, the Benedictine chapter of Worcester Cathedral, farmed to Sandwell the church at West Bromwich in perpetuity. Sandwell thus took the revenues of the church but agreed to pay 6 marks, i.e. £4, annually to Worcester and to meet all the costs of the church. As with other monasteries, the constitutional crisis of Edward I's reign brought financial difficulties. In 1296 the king seized the temporalities of houses in response to the bull Clericis laicos and retained them until a subsidy of one fifth had been paid. A long list in a Close Roll of February 1297 records those restored on payment of the subsidy, including those belonging to the Prior of Sandwell, who had given the sum to the Sheriff of Staffordshire.

There was a further period of acquisitive activity in the second half of the 14th century, after the Black death had depressed land values. In 1365 Sandwell acquired property at Padbury in Buckinghamshire: a house and a virgate of land – nominally 30 acres. From 1388 there was an attempt to acquire the farm of Alberbury Priory in Shropshire. Alberbury was of the Grandmontine order, a dependency of the mother house in the Limousin, and so an alien priory subject to royal confiscation whenever there was war or even tension with France. It was available to farm at a rent of 20 marks but ultimately negotiations were fruitless. In 1398 the priory was able to appropriate its share of Ellesborough church, an acquisition which required authorisation from the Pope. This allowed to collect the tithes, so long as it made provision for a priest to serve the needs of the parish. The inevitable result was a gradual decline of provision and a decay of the church fabric while the priory used the funds for other purposes. At some point the priory acquired a fulling mill at Fazeley, which it leased out. By the time of its dissolution in 1525 the priory also had two watermills at West Bromwich, and lands in various places around the West Midlands, including Dudley, Tipton, Great Barr, Little Barr, Harborne, Coston Hackett, Wombourne, and Wednesbury.

== The priory buildings ==
The priory buildings stood in a rectangular enclosure, with boundary ditches on at least three sides. Initially there were two wooden domestic buildings, adjoining a stone church, which later became the chancel as the nave was extended westwards from it. The wooden buildings were rebuilt in stone within a few decades and then partially rebuilt again a century later.

The church in its completed form was oriented to the east. It had a crossing, with north and south transepts. The chancel had an apsidal east end. The crossing was surmounted by a rectangular belfry. There were pairs of chapels to both north and south. In the 15th century the church was reduced in size – understandably in view of the small size of the community. A survey of 1526 measured the chancel at 41 feet long and 18 feet wide and the nave at 57 × 18 feet, so it was probably well over 100 feet or 30 metres at its largest.

The cloister and residential buildings stretched to the north of the church. Large, two-storey buildings surrounded the cloister, including the kitchens and stores. In addition to the main complex, there was a gatehouse with guardroom, a large barn 72 × 24 and a hayhouse, a kilnhouse, a stable, and a thatched watermill.

To the north of the buildings were at least two fishponds. The spring to the south was channelled to supply the priory with water for the kitchens and to flush the reredorter or latrine, and also to fill the ponds.

Remains of Sandwell Priory

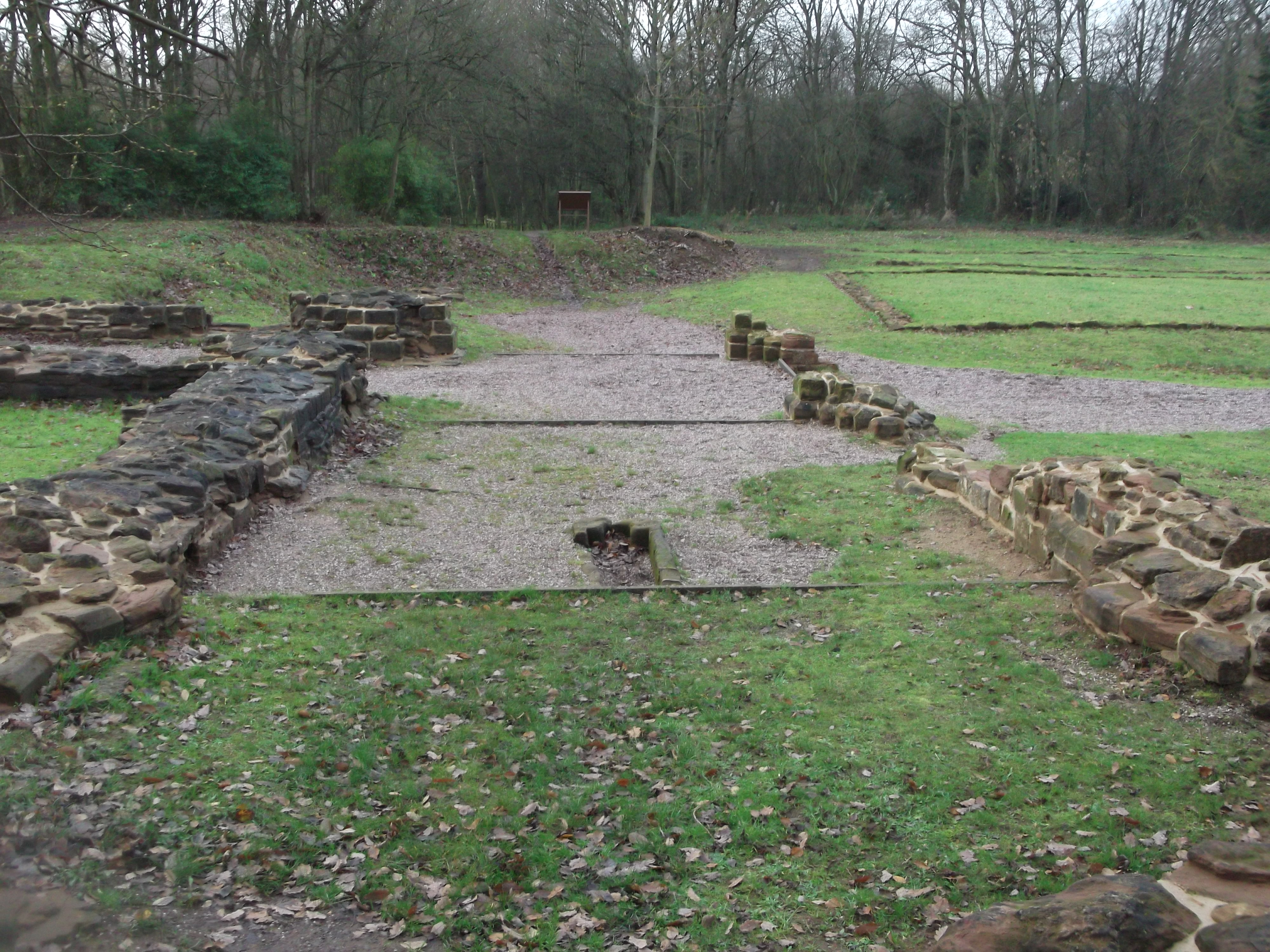
The priory church from the east.

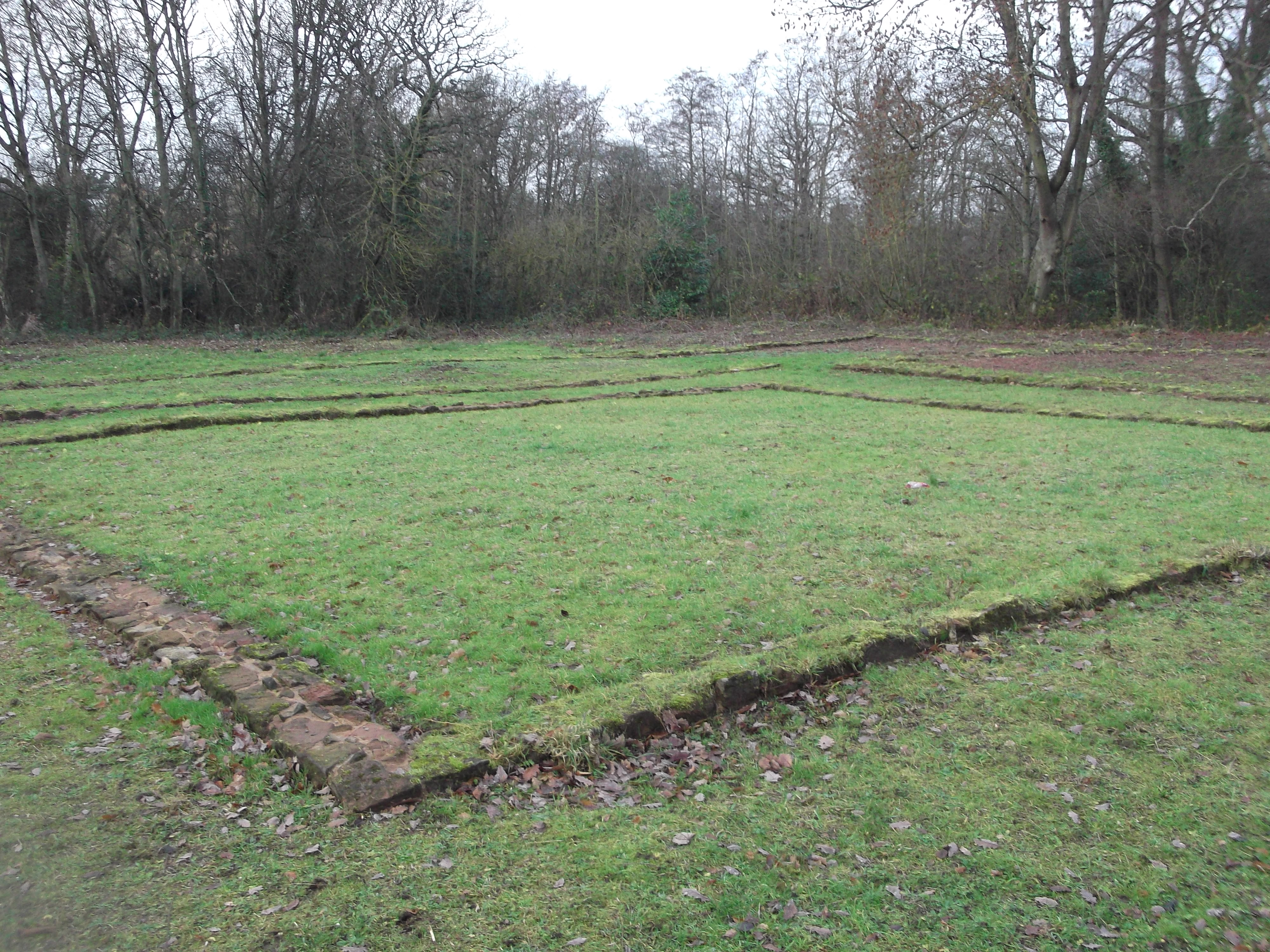
The outline of the cloister.

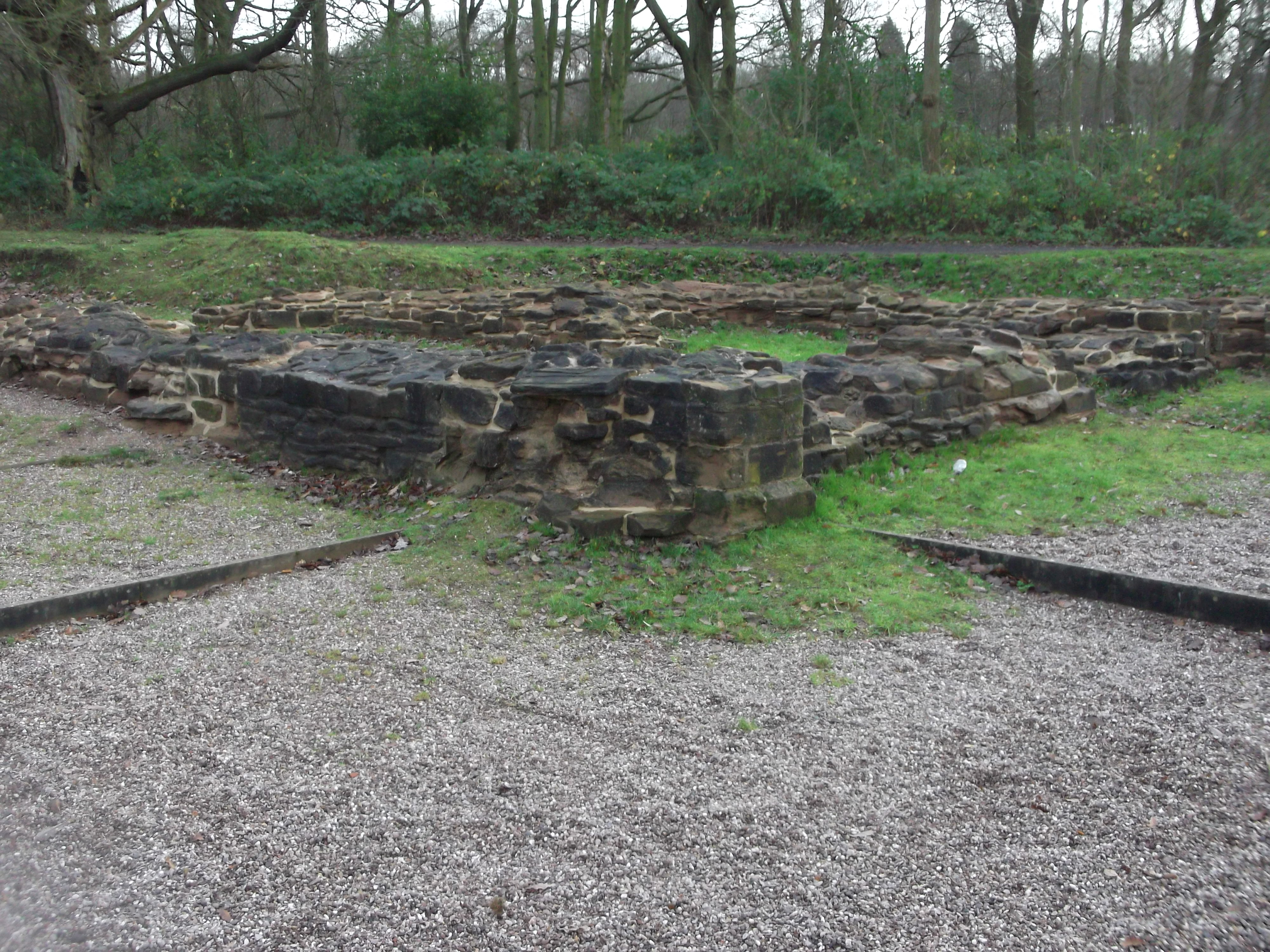
Remains of the north chapels.

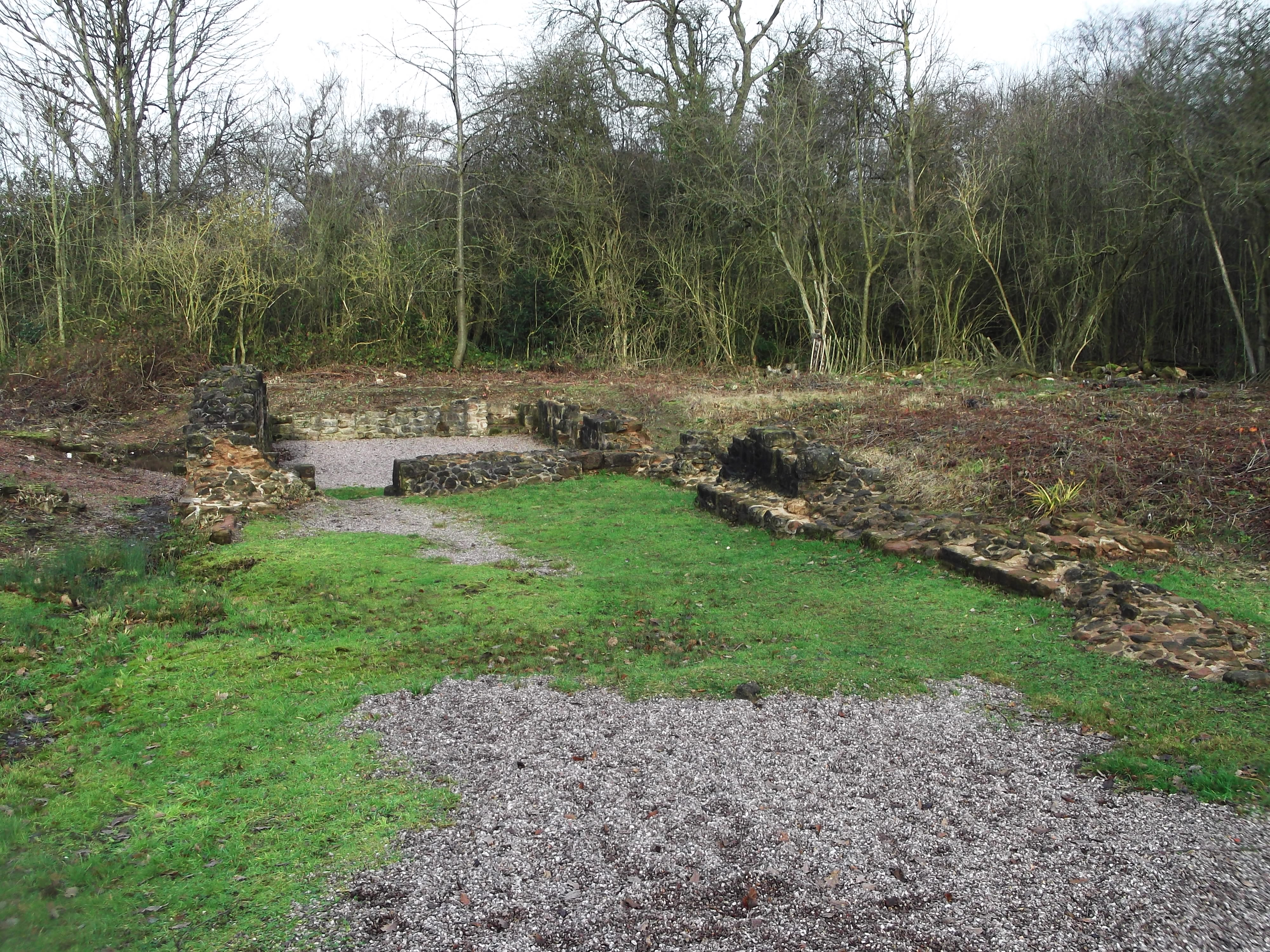
Remains of north transept with sacristy beyond.

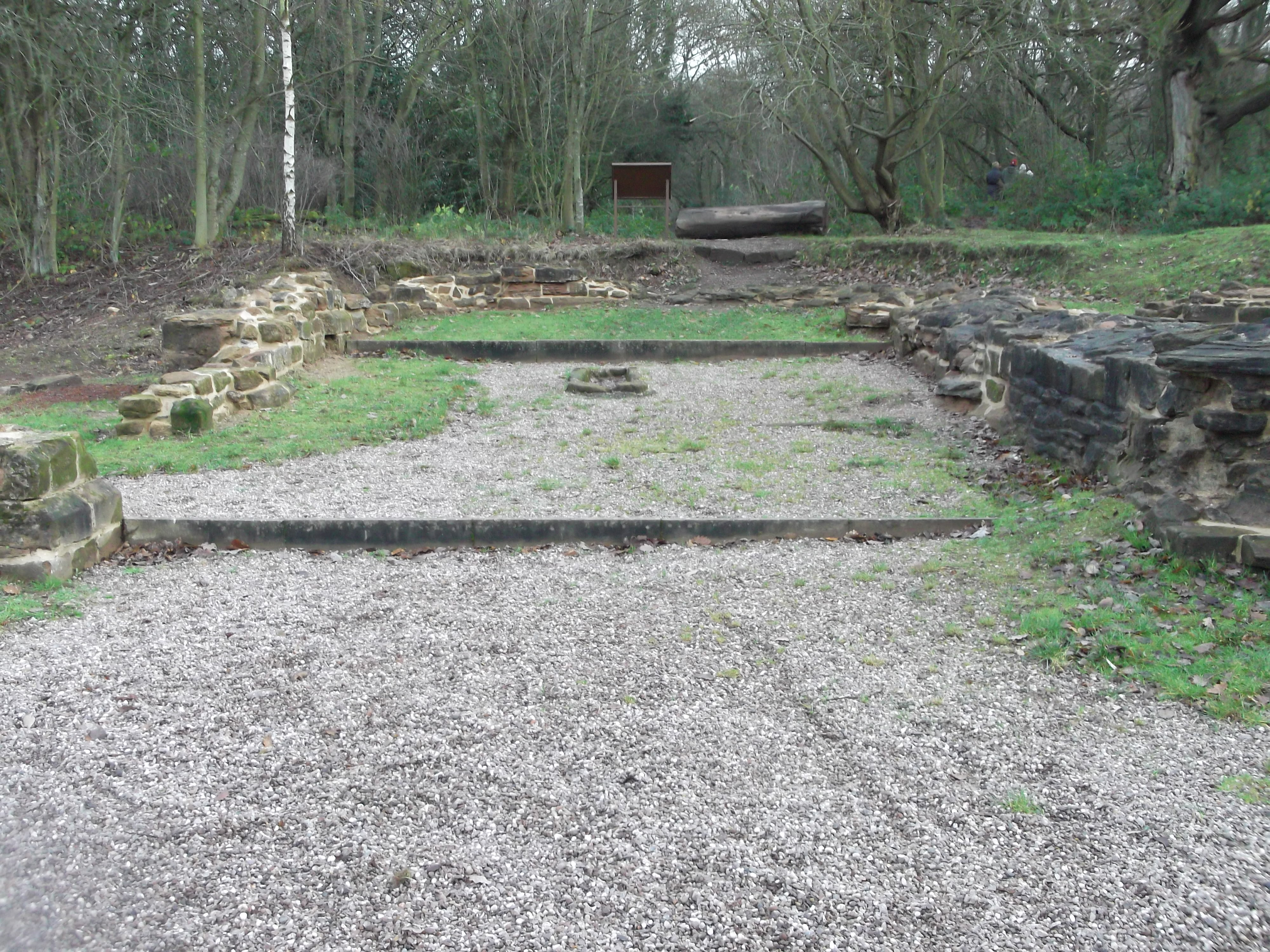
The presbytery or chancel, photographed from the west.

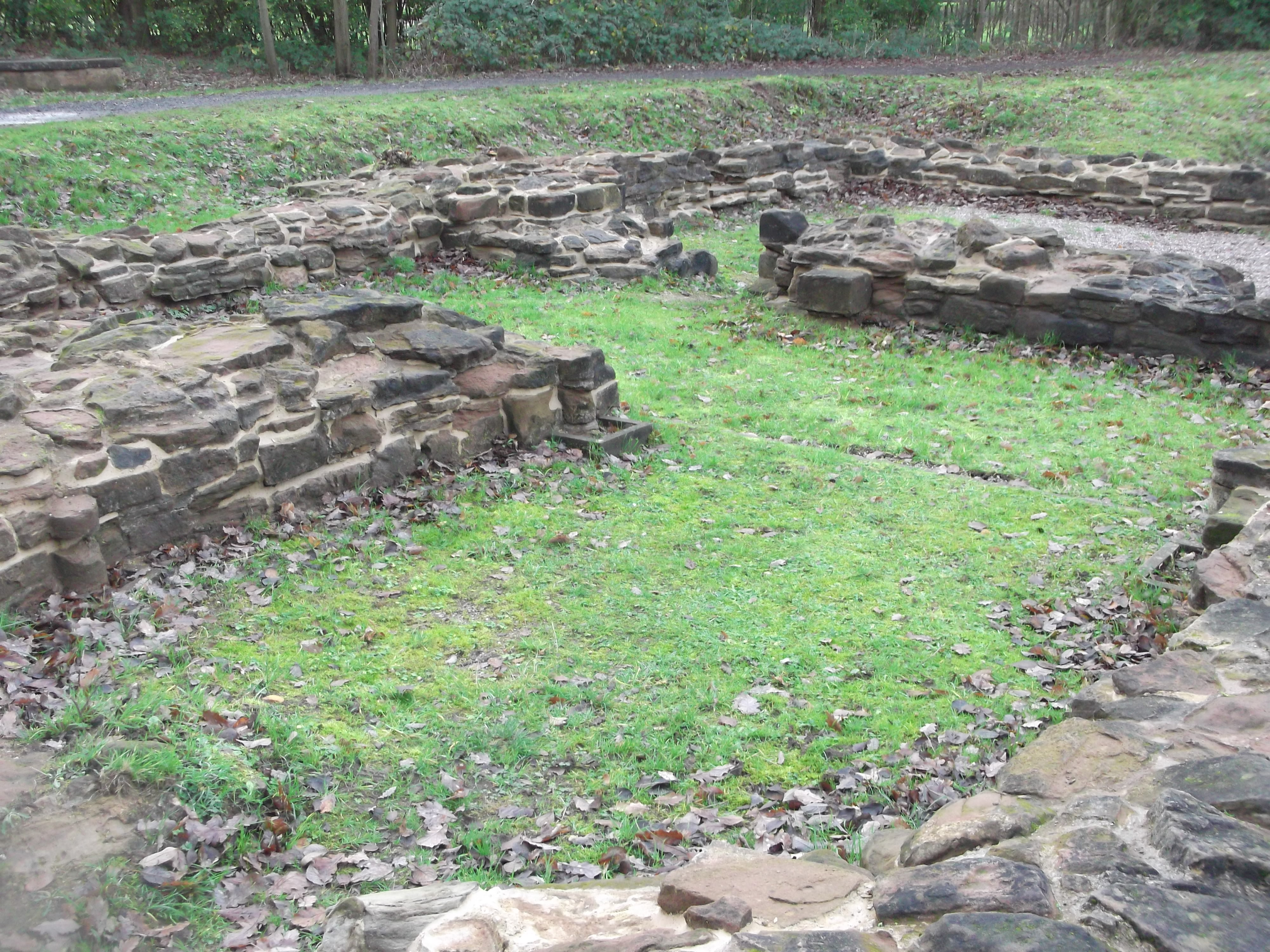
Remains of the south chapels photographed from the chancel.

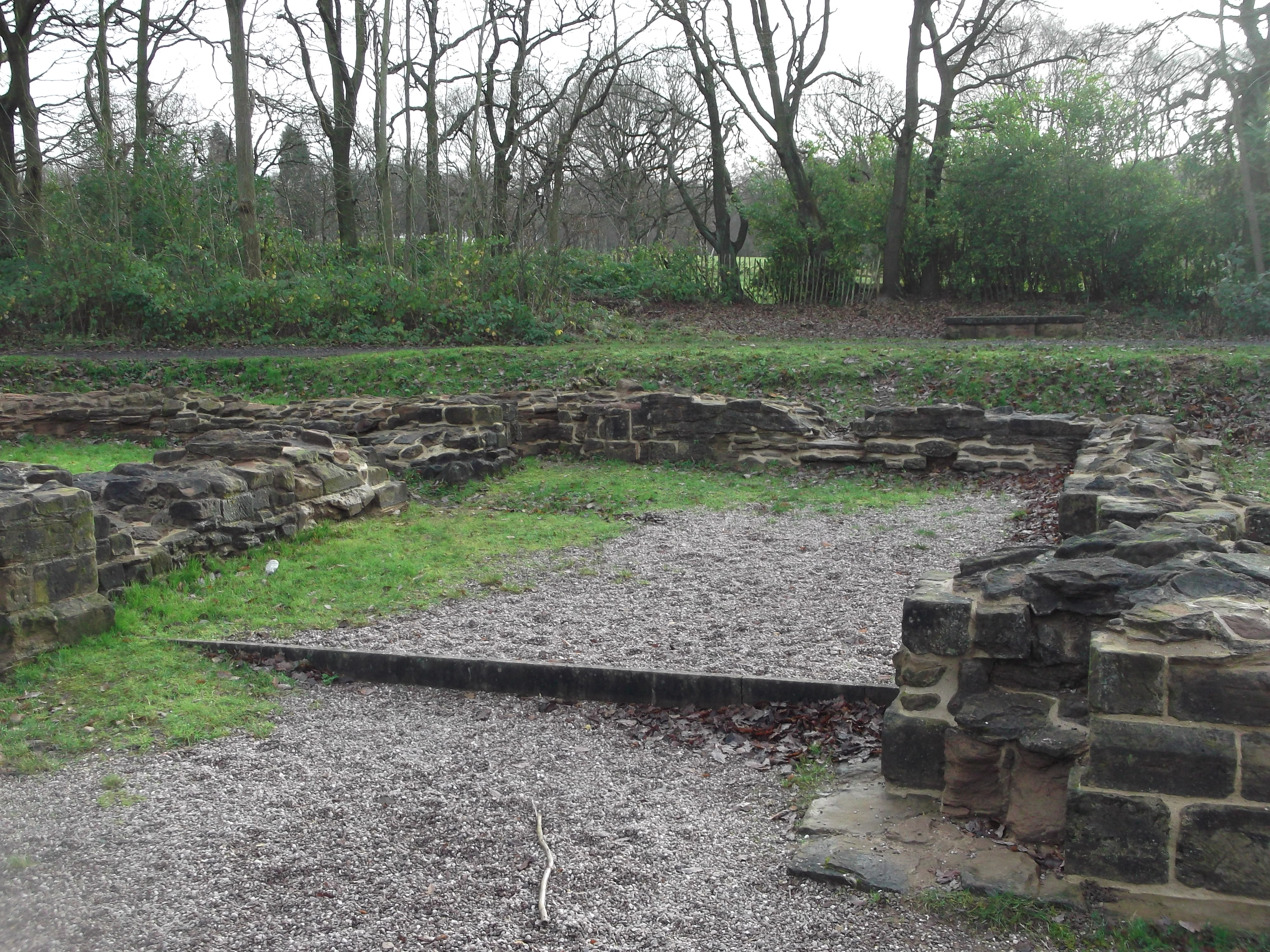
The south transept and south chapels.

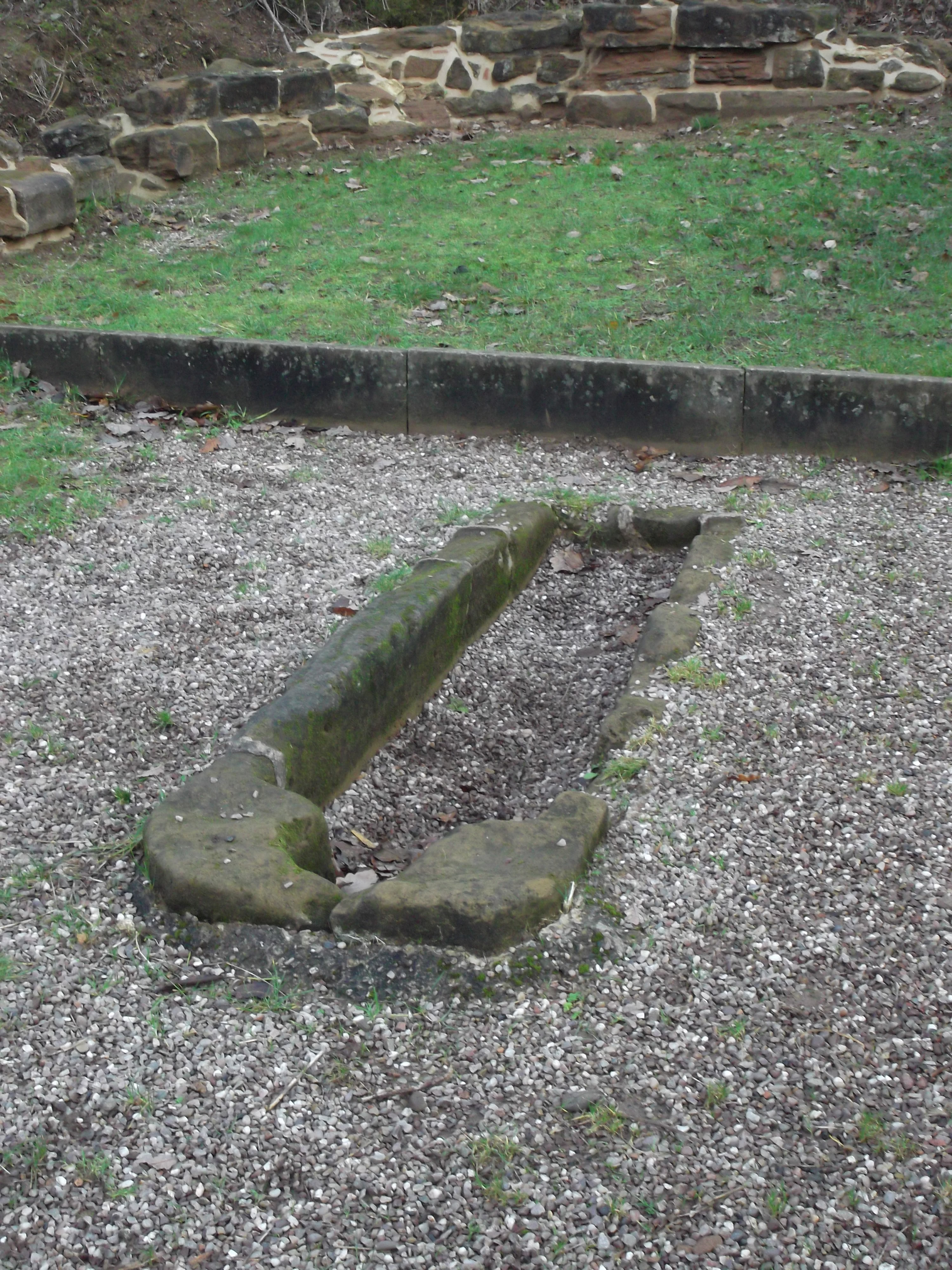
Tomb in the chancel.

== Conflict and disorder ==
Sandwell Priory seems to have had a turbulent history and to have lacked real vigour as a community. There were serious tensions within the priory, between the monks and lay people, and between the priory and other ecclesiastical institutions.

=== Parles disputes ===
The priory was soon involved in a series of disputes with the Parles family that lasted for several decades. In 1211 William de Parles sued the prior for 10 acres in Sandwell and in 1212 for 10 acres in Handsworth. The precise connection of the Parles family with Handsworth, to the south-east of the priory, is unclear. The manor had been part of William Fitz-Ansculf's huge holdings and would have passed via the Paynels to their successors, the de Somery family, as part of the lordship of Dudley. However, not until 1242 is there clear evidence that John de Parles held Handsworth from Roger de Somery as an under-tenant. It is possible that Pain de Parles acquired a foothold at Handsworth in the 12th century through his wife, Alice, but documentation is no longer extant. William de Parles claimed lands in Handsworth by right of Pain and Alice. The lay advocate of the priory was now Richard, son of the founder and grandson of Guy de Offeni. The prior called upon him to vindicate the priory's claim to the land. The result of the case is unknown. William de Parles seems to have adhered to the rebel side against King John in the First Barons' War. In 1216 his Handsworth lands were confiscated and granted to Robert de Teneray. In 1222 he gave up his claim to the Sandwell land in return for £5, given to him by the advocate, Richard. However, Richard died without issue shortly after and was succeeded by his brother, William, who survived for only two more years. In June 1224 William de Parles took advantage of a perceived weakness to claim half the advowson of the priory, alleging that it was he who had presented Prior Reynold during the reign of King John. William the advocate died before the case could be settled, leaving a young son, William, as heir. The case was adjourned sine die.

William de Parles himself was dead by 1227. In 1230 John de Parles claimed half the advowson of Handsworth from the priory, the other half remaining with Lenton Priory. The prior remitted his claim, and in return John gave the priory a house in Birmingham. The disputes with the Parles family abated for thirty years. However, in 1260 William de Parles and eleven of his men attacked the prior, who barely escaped with his life. The miscreants did not turn up for the court hearing. It seems that violence was for William a way of life and he was subsequently hanged for his crimes. An inquisition held at Wolverhampton in April 1280 uncovered his erratic property dealings and found that he had in his later years granted to the prior of Sandwell 20s. rent annually from his mill at Hamstead.

=== Indiscipline and decline ===
In 1324, the newly elected Richard de Eselberg sought to establish his authority with support from Roger Northburgh, a vigorous, reforming Bishop of Coventry and Lichfield. Northburgh wrote to the monks personally, urging obedience to the prior and denouncing one of the community for wandering about in secular dress. About the same time, he excommunicated on behalf of the priory a group of laymen who had been removing or sequestering its property. In 1339 a letter from the Papal Curia in Avignon referred to Robert Ingheram, a monk of Sandwell, who had apparently left his order and wished to be reconciled.

However, priors were sometimes themselves in serious trouble. In 1341 the prior Richard le Warde intervened in a dispute at Tettenhall, where there was conflict over the status of the College of St Michael as a royal chapel. The dean had made an appointment in the regular way of Louis de Cherleton as prebendary of Codsall. It was then alleged that the Pope, with the support of other ecclesiastical authorities, was contesting the appointment and sought to impose a different candidate through papal provision. Edward III forbade any further proceedings against Cherleton on 8 March 1341 and again on 10 May. On 10 October Prior Richard and his chaplain Edmund were included in a list of those planning to remove Cherleton in contravention of the king's earlier decrees. The arrest of all of them was ordered. They failed to appear before the King's Bench in Stafford and the Sheriff was ordered to attach the prior and arrest the others to appear in Hilary term of the following year. It seems that again nothing happened and the cases were then postponed again to the Trinity term. This time Roger Northburgh, the Bishop of Coventry and Lichfield appeared in court as a defendant and the matter was again put off until the Michaelmas term. What became of the cases against the prior and his priest is unknown but the king ultimately got his way.

The Black Death seems to have brought the priory to a particularly low ebb. When Prior Richard le Warde died in 1349, Nicholas de Cumpton had to be appointed in his place as he was the only other monk in the community. In 1354 the ageing Bishop Northburgh wrote denouncing poor property and financial management: the priory had neglected woodland and fences and let land on leases that were too long. In 1361, when Prior William del Ree died, there was again only one other monk, Henry of Kidderminster, who became the new prior.

=== Shrewsbury party ===
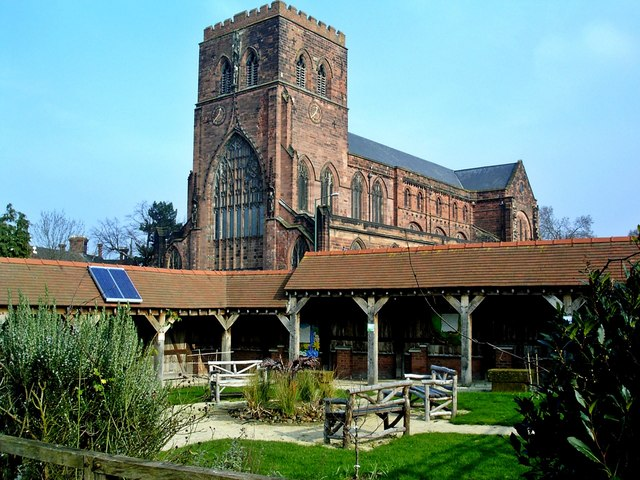
Shrewsbury Abbey, an important Benedictine house in the Middle Ages, is an Anglican parish church today.

The malaise encouraged Shrewsbury Abbey to attempt a take-over. It seems that around 1370 the Abbot of Shrewsbury, the long-lived Nicholas Stevens, encouraged one Richard Tudenham to put himself forward as the rightful prior against the holder of the office, Prior John de Kyngeston. At Easter 1372 Kyngeston cited five men in the King's Bench, who he alleged had assaulted him: they failed to appear and the Sheriff was ordered to arrest them. When the five finally appeared before the court, in summer 1373, Kyngeston alleged against John de Witton, that he had wounded him in the arm with an arrow. Witton tried to forestall further action by claiming that the writ had been incorrectly phrased because it named Kyngeston as the prior of Sandwell, when the real prior was Tudenham. Kyngeston then initiated a case against Nicholas Stevens, although it is not known exactly what he alleged against the abbot.

On 8 December 1379 a commission of oyer and terminer was issued following further allegations made by Kyngeston against Stevens and some of his associates. Kyngeston said that he had been assaulted at the priory itself by a gang consisting of Stevens, Richard de Westbury and Ralph de Wyburbury, both monks of Shrewsbury Abbey, Henry Morwood, the vicar of Handsworth, four other secular clergy and others. Abducted from the priory, he was held at a house in Sleap, one of the Abbey's manors to the north of Shrewsbury. Before a notary public he was forced to sign a resignation statement and to call off all proceedings against Stevens. Despite the allegations of coercion, Bishop Robert de Stretton proceeded as if the prior's resignation were valid. He received letters under the seal of Sandwell Priory stating that the two remaining monks had elected Richard de Westbury as their prior and he confirmed Westbury as prior. Westbury now found himself challenged by Tudenham, the original pretender to the office. Tudenham obtained papal provision to the priory and began an action against Westbury in the Church courts. However, Richard II's Council ordered his arrest on 8 July 1380 because he had breached the Statute of Provisors, a 1350 law designed to prevent such appointments by the Pope. Westbury seems not to have enjoyed good relations with the patrons. When Richard, the last of Guy de Offeni's male line died around 1250, the manor of West Bromwich had been divided between his daughters, Sarah and Margaret. The latter married into the Marnham family, which thereafter held half of the manor. In 1387 John Marnham sued Westbury for delivery of a bond which he had retained unlawfully, a nadir in the priory's relations with its lay patrons.

When the time came in 1391 to elect Westbury's successor, there was again only one monk left in the priory. He promptly elected William Pontesbury, a monk of Shrewsbury and a close friend of Westbury. However, the new bishop, Richard le Scrope, annulled his choice and brought in John of Tamworth from Coventry as prior – one of at least three occasions in the 14th century when the election of a prior was overturned by a bishop. However, this was not the end of the struggle. In 1397 Alexander Leddesham, a renegade monk aided by an armed gang, drove Tamworth out and for some time occupied his place. Tamworth took action in Chancery to recover his position, complaining that Leddesham still rode the countryside at the head of an armed band.

The ambitious Abbot Stevens died in 1399 and this may have made it easier to accept a prior from Shrewsbury. In 1401, Archbishop Thomas Arundel, restored to office by the new regime of Henry IV, was conducting a canonical visitation and personally appointed John de Acton, a monk of Shrewsbury, as successor to Tamworth. His successor, Richard Dudley, was accused of harbouring murderers and thieves in 1414. The allegations concerned the activities of a group of robbers and extortioners who killed a man at Wolverhampton and maimed others at Tettenhall. Dudley was said to have received them at the priory just before Christmas 1413. He was bailed and ultimately pardoned, as were the bandits.

== Dissolution ==
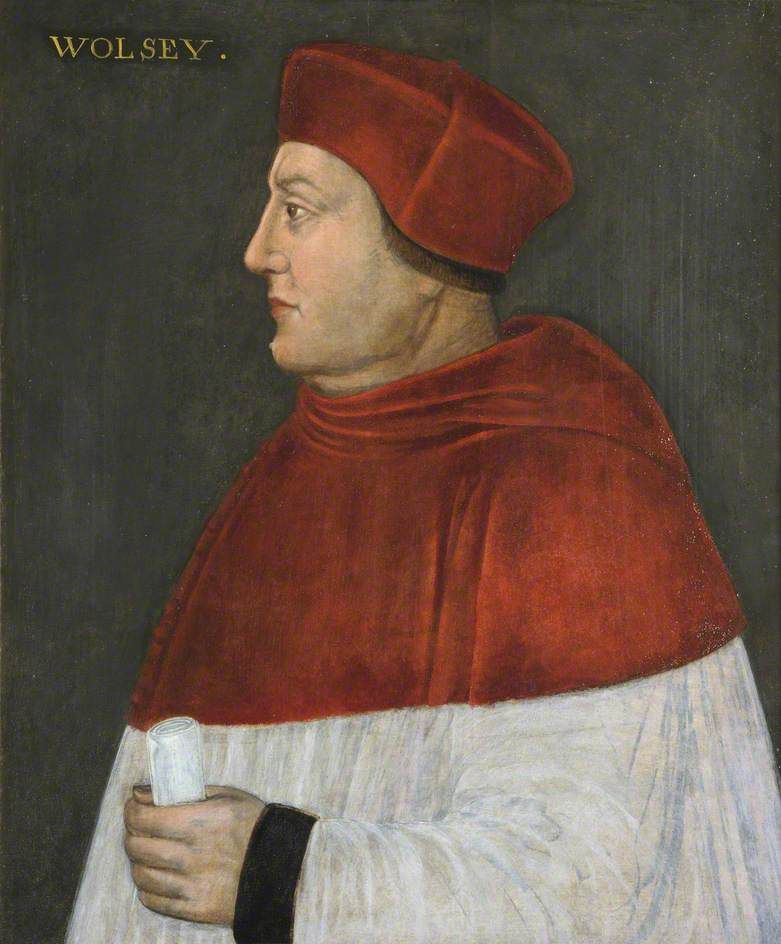
Cardinal Thomas Wolsey.

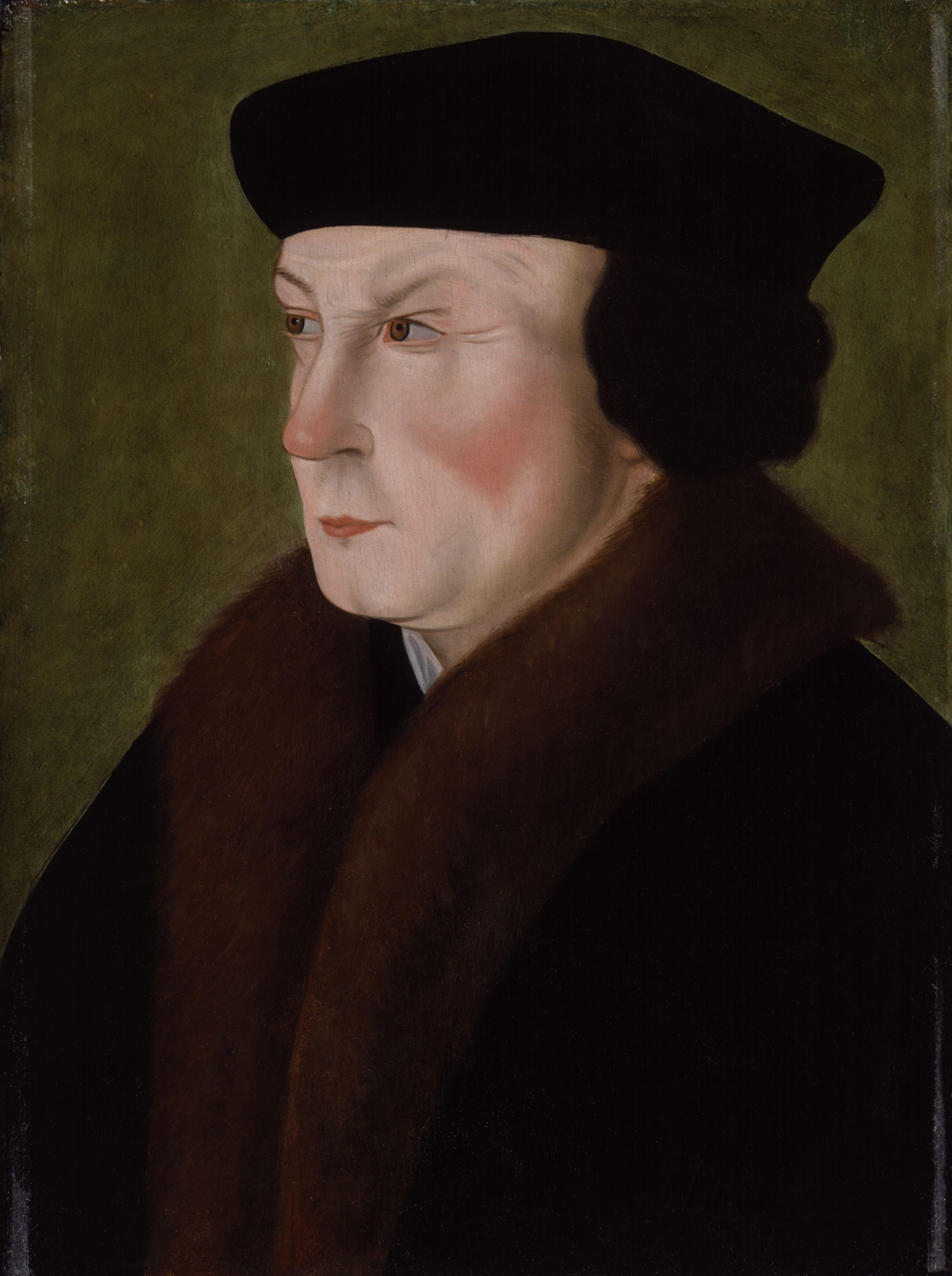
Thomas Cromwell

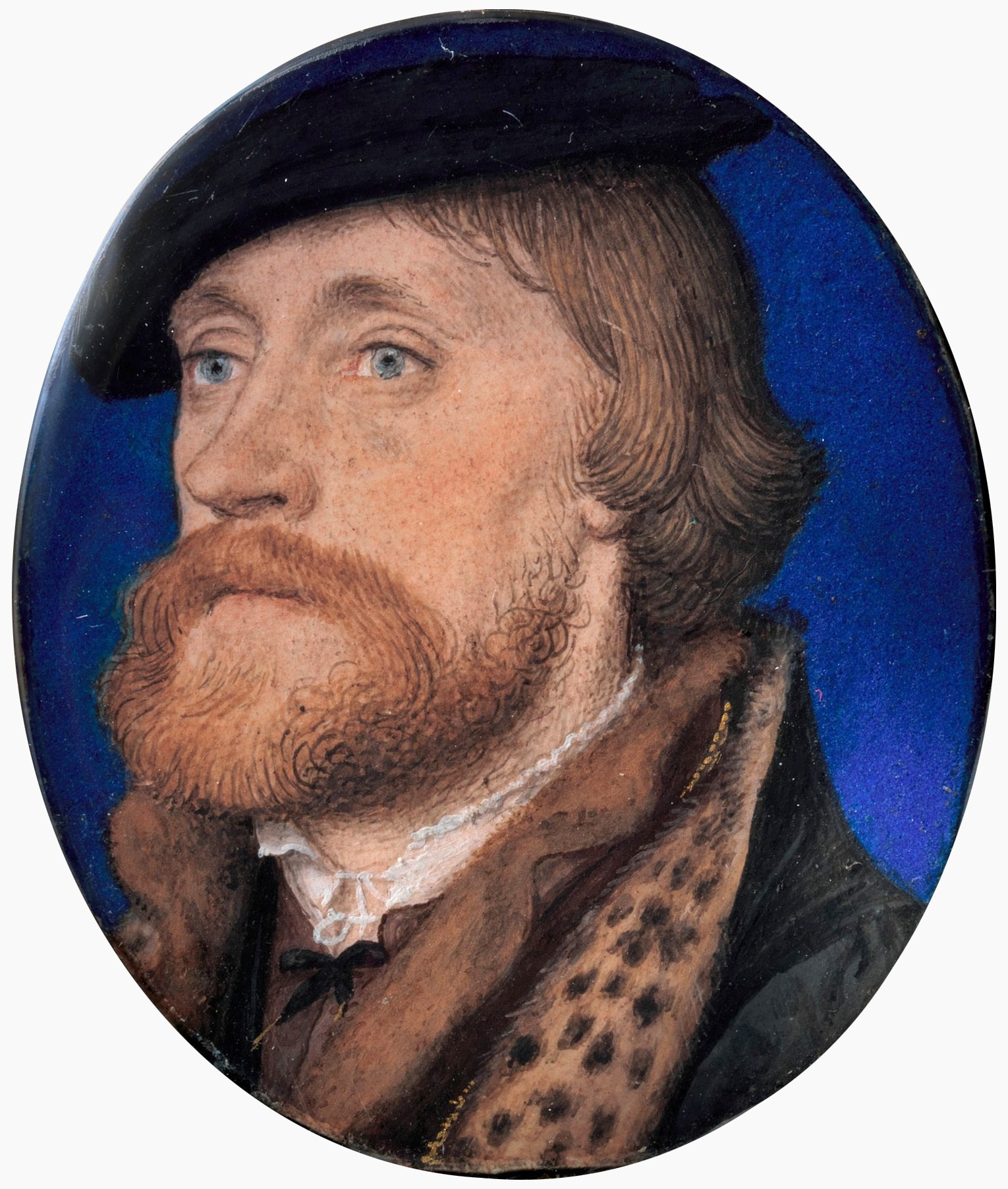
Thomas Wriothesley

Cardinal Thomas Wolsey had little respect for the independence of the monasteries and at the outset of his Chancellorship in 1515 requested papal sanction for visitations of all houses in England, obtaining it in 1518. In 1524 – then at the height of his power and influence as Lord Chancellor and Archbishop of York – he decided to found a new, eighth college for Oxford University, which was to be called Cardinal College. To finance this, he proposed to suppress the Priory of St Frideswide, Oxford and a number of other monasteries around the country. In September 1524 Pope Clement VII issued a bull approving Wolsey's appropriation of further houses up to the value of 3000 ducats and letters patent were issued in line with the papal bull.

Sandwell was an obvious target, with a long history of abuses and conflict and a very small community – back at that point to the prior and a single monk. Sandwell and Canwell Priory were the two Staffordshire houses named with St Frideswide's as suitable for incorporation in Wolsey's scheme on a list of 22 houses, drafted by Thomas Wriothesley, then newly employed to work under Thomas Cromwell for the Cardinal. On 1 October Sandwell was again listed for suppression when the king gave his assent for Wolsey to implement his scheme.

The deed for the suppression of Sandwell was written by William Burbank and is dated 4 February 1525. It was signed by Prior John Baylye, who was transferred to another Benedictine house, like the other monk. The king conveyed the sites and properties of Sandwell and the other suppressed monasteries to Wolsey on 20 January 1526. On 10 February Wolsey transferred them to John Hygdon, the dean of Cardinal College. A full survey of all the monastic properties was carried out and handed over to Hygdon in June 1527. The founders, or rather their heirs, were listed for each house: Sandwell's were given as Edward Sutton, 2nd Baron Dudley and Thomas Stanley of Stafford. Sandwell Priory and its properties were valued at less than £40 a year – the spiritualities (income from tithes and religious functions) at £12 and the temporalities (rents and dues) at £26 8s. 7d. Higdon set about exploiting the estates more thoroughly: William Brabazon wrote to Cromwell mentioning how Higdon had visited Sandwell as he toured his lands, aiming to raise rents where possible. It seems that Wolsey retained some control of the church at West Bromwich and in 1528 Cromwell tried to get the curate ejected and replaced by William, the former monk of the priory. For a time the rival priests competed to say Mass in the church and litigation followed.

== After dissolution ==
On Wolsey's impeachment in 1529, the fate of Sandwell and the other suppressed houses became uncertain, although it seems that their restoration was not on the agenda. The properties reverted to the Crown and were not necessarily granted to the successor college, King's, which later became Christ Church, Oxford. Commissions of local landed gentry were set up in the counties affected to carry out inquisitions into the properties: those named in Staffordshire were Sir John Giffard, Sir Edward Aston, Edward Littleton and John Vernon. Once this work was done, Burbank and Cromwell travelled to Staffordshire and stayed five days at Sandwell in February 1530, selling off anything of value and raising £21. The bells of Sandwell they valued at £33 6s. 8d. - a sum that was exactly the same as bells at a number of other houses. Many of Sandwell's estates were passed on to the new college, but the Ellesborough estates and advowson went to Sheen Priory and St George's Chapel, Windsor Castle.

The manor of Sandwell was a useful windfall for a monarchy perennially in debt and was used to reduce future outgoings. It was included in a group of properties granted by the Crown to Dame Lucy Clifford in exchange for her share of a pension that she had inherited from the estate of the Marquess of Montagu When she died in 1557, it passed to her grandson, John Cutte, who later sold it to the Whorwood family of Compton Hallows, near Kinver. During the 16th century some of the priory buildings were renovated to create a comfortable private home, known as Priory House. The church was still largely standing in 1588 but was demolished shortly after.

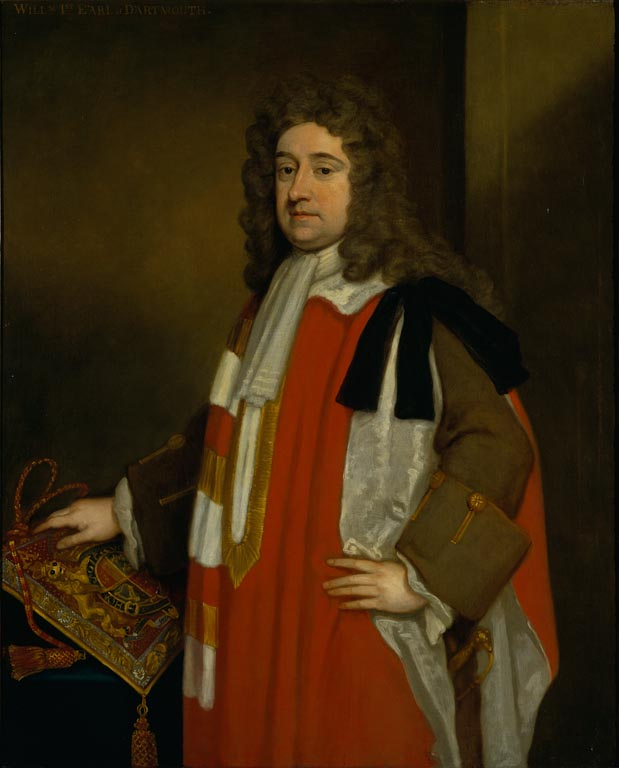
William Legge, 1st Earl of Dartmouth

Following the tribulations of the English Civil War and subsequent indebtedness, the Whorwoods sold Sandwell in 1701 to William Legge, 2nd Baron Dartmouth, who was created 1st Earl of Dartmouth in 1711. Sandwell Park became an important estate of the Earls of Dartmouth, who owned over 2000 acres in the area by 1845. A large new Georgian house was built directly adjoining the eastern end of the priory site, and reusing some of its foundations and masonry. However, the earls acquired a further seat in the West Midlands at Patshull Hall, which became their residence from 1853., although the widow Countess Dartmouth Augusta Legge lived here and she was a source of philanthropy for the local area. Parts of the Sandwell estate were subsequently sold for housing and in 1947 West Bromwich council bought 1,367 acres from William Legge, 7th Earl of Dartmouth to preserve a substantial area of open country for the use of townspeople.

== Present site ==
Today, the site is within Sandwell Valley Country Park, and within the Priory Woods Local Nature Reserve, in modern West Bromwich, and is managed by Sandwell Metropolitan Borough Council, named after the priory and park. Very little remains of the priory, although its ground-plan has been marked out and the lay-out of the church is fairly clear. There are some low level walls of the structure and the remains of an open stone grave that resides in the eastern transept. The site is beside a footpath and is open to the public free of charge at all times. It is a scheduled monument.

A small museum in the country park's visitor centre at Sandwell Park Farm includes exhibits relating to the priory.
