= Hamstead, West Midlands =

Coordinates: 52.53057°N 1.924748°W

Hamstead
- Location within the West Midlands
- OS grid reference: SP047928
- Metropolitan county: West Midlands
- Region: West Midlands
- Country: England
- Sovereign state: United Kingdom
- Post town: BIRMINGHAM
- Postcode district: B42, B43
- Dialling code: 0121
- Police: West Midlands
- Fire: West Midlands
- Ambulance: West Midlands
- UK Parliament: Birmingham Perry Barr; West Bromwich East

Hamstead is an area straddling the border of Birmingham and Sandwell, England, between Handsworth Wood and Great Barr, and adjacent to the Sandwell Valley area of West Bromwich. Hamstead Colliery was worked from the 19th century to the 1960s, with much housing built for the miners. Today the area is still referred to as Hamstead Village.

The River Tame enters Hamstead after passing through Sandwell Valley, and runs through the village before exiting into Perry Hall Park. It is the largest tributary of the River Trent but is not navigable. After heavy rains it can overspill its banks, flooding the village. As of 2020, flood alleviation works are being undertaken at Sandwell Valley, to protect Hamstead. Two brick bridges over the Tame in Hamstead are Grade II listed.

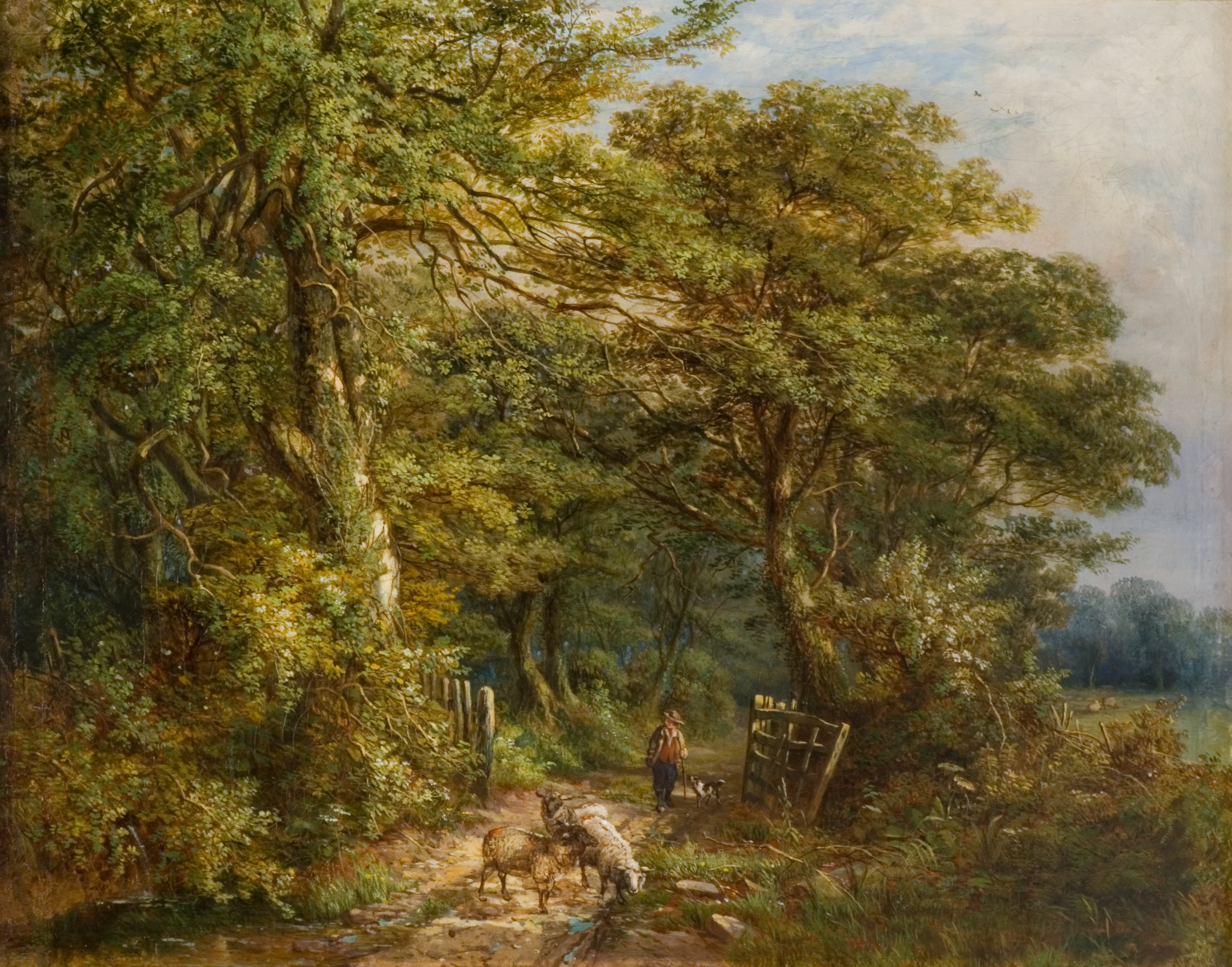
A Lane at Hamstead, Staffordshire by William Ellis (1747-1810); now in the Garman Ryan Collection at The New Art Gallery Walsall

St Paul's Church, Hamstead was consecrated in 1892. Its grounds include Hamstead War Memorial, commemorating local men who died in World War I. Both church and memorial are Grade II listed.

There is also a secondary School, Hamstead Hall Academy.

== Transport ==
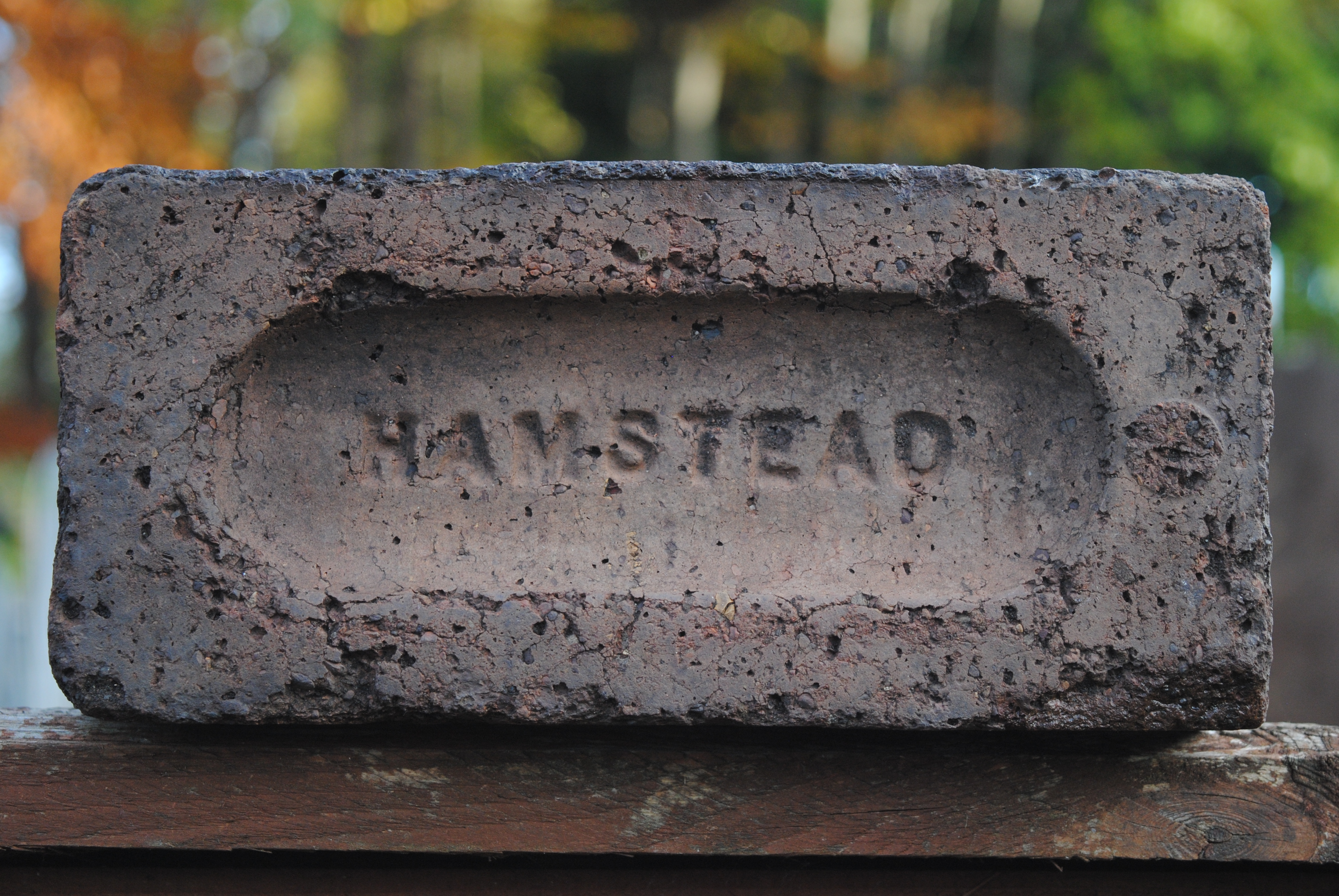
A brick made at Hamstead Colliery brickworks.

The Tame Valley Canal runs through Hamstead Village near to the old colliery site. Coal used to be transported from Hamstead Wharf near Spouthouse Lane along the canal to the Grand Union Canal and onwards.

The area is served by Hamstead railway station on the Birmingham-Walsall Line, part of the former Grand Junction Railway, opened in 1837. Trains run half-hourly in both directions, from 0530 until 0000 seven days a week. Trains are Operated by West Midlands Trains.

== Hamstead Village ==
The area of Hamstead which is a part of Old Walsall Road is commonly referred to as Hamstead Village by the locals. Hamstead Village contains a variety of shops and business which run in the area, such as supermarkets and hairdressers. A Lidl shop used to be located at Hamstead Village, but has since been moved further down Old Walsall Road where a former GKN factory used to be located at, and is now revamped and much larger than the previous Lidl building, being 1,410sqm, alongside 141 parking spaces.

== Notable people ==
- Francis Asbury (1745 – 1816), one of the first two bishops of the Methodist Episcopal Church in the United States.
- John 'Brummie' Stokes, soldier and mountaineer, born in Hamstead in 1945.
