= Sandwell Valley Country Park =

Country park in the West Midlands of England

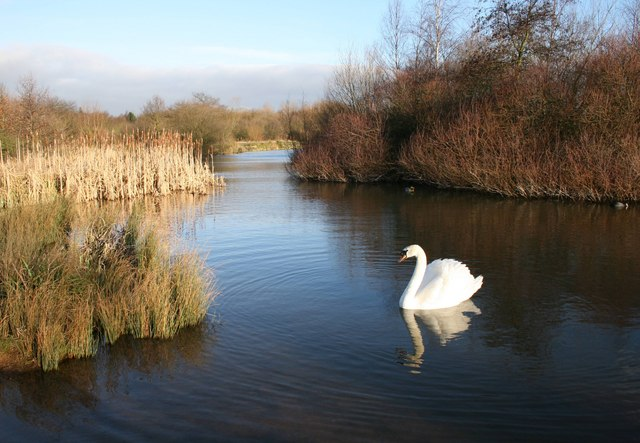
- Swan Pool

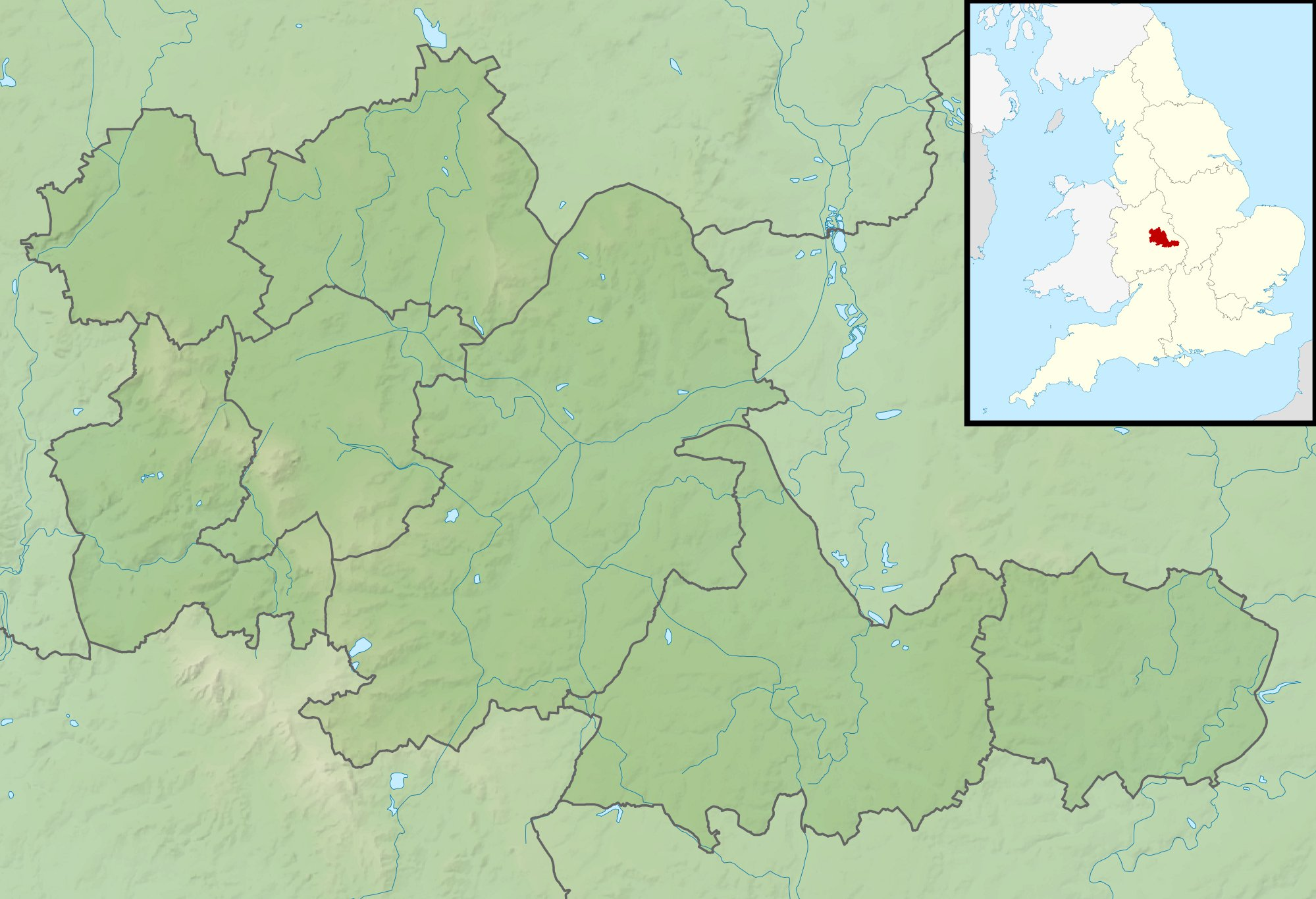
- Location within West Midlands county
- Location: near West Bromwich, West Midlands
- OS grid: SP024925
- Coordinates: 52.53°N 1.96°W
- Operator: Sandwell Metropolitan Borough Council
- Website: Sandwell Valley

Sandwell Valley Country Park is a country park, run by Sandwell Metropolitan Borough Council, in Sandwell Valley, on the River Tame in the middle of the urban conurbation between Birmingham and West Bromwich in West Midlands, England.

== Location and features ==
The country park stretches from the A41 at West Bromwich to the edge of Walsall. The main entrances to the site are at Sandwell Park Farm, Salter's Lane, West Bromwich, B71 4BG. Forge Mill Farm, Forge Lane, West Bromwich B71 3SZ.

Leisure facilities include a pitch-and-putt golf course, a Millennium Cycle Route, a Mountain Bike Trail, tennis courts, and open spaces. Swan Pool (also known as Wasson or Warstone) is used for sailing.

The park has received a Green Flag Award.

Sandwell Valley parkrun happens here every Saturday at 9.00 am. This is a free, timed, 5-kilometre event for walkers, joggers, and runners organized by volunteers.

== Local nature reserves ==
Priory Woods and Forge Mill Lake, both local nature reserves (LNRs) since 1991, are within the park.

Priory Woods LNR has an area of 21 hectares (52 acres). It has woodland, with many varieties of native trees and introduced species; pools, inhabited by wildfowl; and the ruins of Sandwell Priory. Footpaths in the reserve link to other areas of the country park. The car park for the reserve is at Sandwell Park Farm.

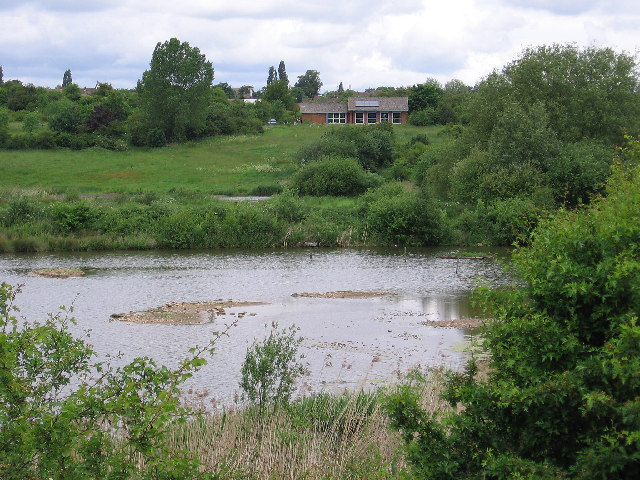
Forge Mill Lake

Forge Mill Lake LNR has an area of 63 hectares (160 acres). The lake is alongside the River Tame, and a footpath around it. The car park for the reserve is close to Forge Mill Farm, on Forge Lane.

Sandwell Valley RSPB reserve manages part of Forge Mill Lake, including one of the two islands; there is a bird hide and an RSPB visitor centre. The reserve is important for breeding birds, including oystercatchers and lapwings. A car park is next to the visitor centre.

There are two working farm visitor centres. Sandwell Park Farm is a restored Victorian farm with a walled kitchen garden; it has rare breeds including Hereford cattle and Berkshire pigs. Forge Mill Farm has a farm shop and a farm trail.

== History ==
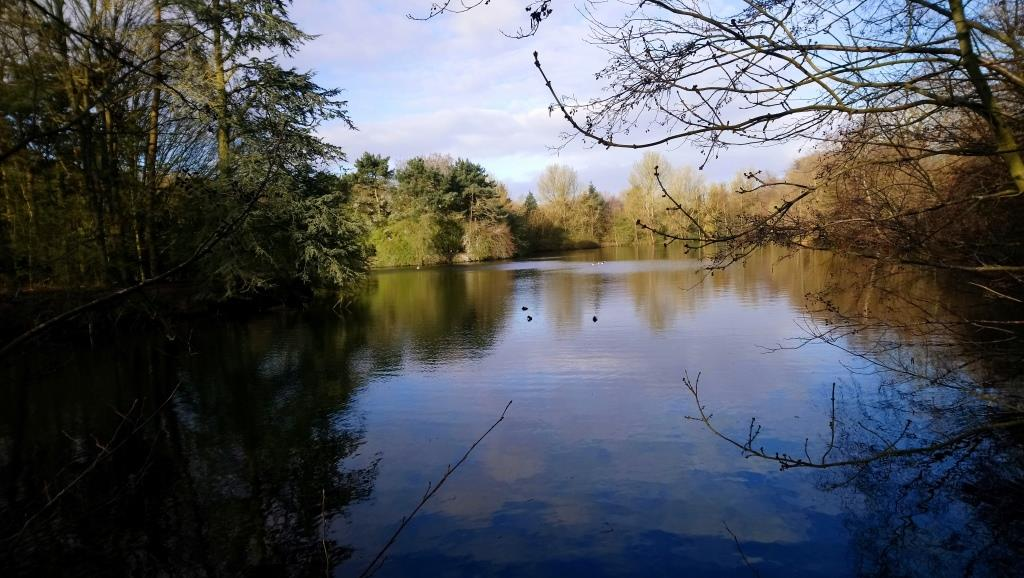
Priory Pools

Sandwell Valley Country Park was once the site of Sandwell Priory, a 12th-century Benedictine monastery which itself was founded on the site of an earlier hermitage. The monastery was closed on the orders of Cardinal Wolsey in 1525, and by 1705 the land was redeveloped once more, into Sandwell Hall, built for the Earl of Dartmouth.

From the late 19th century, the Hall was used as an asylum, and then in 1907, a home for boys, "Sandwell Hall Industrial School for Mentally Defective Boys". In 1928, Sandwell Hall was demolished due to subsidence caused by mining from Sandwell Park (Jubilee) Colliery, which employed over 600 miners. A coal tramway ran from the Jubilee pit through Sandwell Park to the canal at Smethwick. By the 1960s, the site was developed into the Country Park with up to 660 acres (270 ha) set aside for amenities.
