= Puleston =

Surname

Puleston is a surname. Notable people with the surname include:

- Dennis E. Puleston (1940–1978), American archaeologist and ecologist
- Dennis Puleston (1905–2001), British-born American environmentalist, adventurer and designer
- Hamlet Puleston (1632–1662), English academic, known as a political writer
- John Henry Puleston (1830–1908), Welsh journalist and entrepreneur in the United States, later a Conservative politician
- John Puleston (judge) (1583–1659), Welsh barrister and judge
- Robert Puleston, brother-in-law and supporter of Owain Glyndŵr, at the time of his rebellion against King Henry IV of England
- Robert Puleston (MP) (1526–1583), Welsh politician
- Roger Puleston (1565–1618), Welsh politician who sat in the House of Commons at various times between 1584 and 1611
- William D. Puleston (1881–1968), American naval officer and author

== See also ==
- Puleston Cross
- Ian Puleston-Davies (born 1958), British actor and writer
- Puleston baronets, of Emral in the County of Flint, was a title in the Baronetage of the United Kingdom
