= Thomas Trentham (disambiguation) =

Thomas Trentham (1538–1587) was an English politician.

Thomas Trentham may also refer to:

- Thomas Trentham (died 1519?), MP
- Thomas Trentham (1575–1605), MP
