= Trentham =

Trentham may refer to:

== Places ==
Australia

- Trentham, Victoria

England

- Trentham, Staffordshire, a suburb of Stoke-on-Trent, England
  - Trentham Estate, a visitor attraction
  - Trentham Priory, now a ruin

New Zealand

- Trentham, New Zealand, a suburb of Upper Hutt City
  - Trentham Military Camp, located in Upper Hutt

== Surname ==
- Elizabeth Trentham
- Herbert Trentham
- Richard Trentham, MP
- Thomas Trentham
- Thomas Trentham (died ?1519), MP
