= Henry de Verdun (I) =

English sheriff during the middle ages

Sir Henry de Verdun (I) was recorded as being a Knight of Staffordshire in 1227 and 1228 (with his brother Milo de Verdun), and Sheriff of Staffordshire and Coroner there in 1228, seemingly in succession to Henry de Deneston.

== Early life ==
Henry was the son of Bertram de Verdun (III) of Alton Castle, Staffordshire. He married Hawise, daughter of Engenulf de Gresley. He held the manor of Bucknall from his older brother Nicholas de Verdun of Alton, and gained other manors and lands through his marriage to Hawise, including Darlaston, Biddulph, Swadlincote, Thursfield and Levedale.

== Personal life ==
His heir was Henry de Verdun (II), who married Amice, daughter or sister of Sir Roger de Pyvelesdon (died 1272 and commemorated by the Puleston Cross in Newport, Shropshire), father of Jordan de Pyvelesdon, Roger de Pyvelesdon (died 1294), and Alice de Pyvelesdon who married Sir Robert de Harley, Lord of Harley in Shropshire.
