= John de Aston =

John de Aston may refer to:

- John de Aston of Parkhall and Heywood (fl. 1475), sheriff of Staffordshire in the reign of Edward IV of England.
- John de Aston (knight banneret) (died 1523), military character during the reigns of Henry VII and Henry VIII

== See also ==
- John Aston (disambiguation)
