= John Aston =

John Aston may refer to:

== Politicians ==
- John Aston (fl. 1362–1391), MP for Leominster, Dartmouth and Barnstaple
- John Aston (MP for Leominster, 1388)
- John Aston (MP for Ludlow); see Ludlow

== Sportspeople ==
- John Aston Sr. (1921–2003), English footballer
- John Aston Jr. (born 1947), English footballer
- John Aston (cricketer) (1882–1951), Irish cricketer

== Others ==
- John Dastin (c. 1293–c. 1386), associated with Oriel College and worked at the court of cardinal Napoleon Orsini
- John Aston (preacher) (fl. 1382), one of John Wycliffe's earliest followers
- John Aston (knight banneret) (died 1523), a military character of great eminence in the during the reigns of Henry VII and Henry VIII
- John Aston (statistician), British statistician, Chief Scientific Adviser at the Home Office

== See also ==
- John Astin (born 1930), American actor
- John Ashton (actor) (1948–2024), American actor
- John de Aston (disambiguation)
