= Lees Priory =

- Location within Derbyshire
- Interactive map of Lees Priory

Monastery information
- Other name: Leyes Priory
- Order: Augustinian
- Established: before 1160
- Disestablished: after 1517; most probably 1538.
- Mother house: Rocester Abbey, Staffordshire

Site
- Coordinates: 53.208483°N 1.6271412°W

Lees Priory is a former Augustinian priory located in Derbyshire, United Kingdom.

== History ==
Lees Priory was located near to Chatsworth House, in an area of the estate known as Carlton Lees: between the villages of Edensor and Beeley.

The priory was occupied by Augustinian Canons Regular, and was dependent upon Rocester Abbey in Staffordshire. The priory is thought to have been founded before 1160, and dissolved between 1517 and 1540, but its exact status is unclear. It is known to have been dependent upon Rocester Abbey, and is often referred to as a cell to Rocester. However, in 1517, there is reference to the "Prior of Lees", indicating, at least by that point, the establishment was a formal priory; meaning the establishment had far greater Independence and a larger monastic population than a cell, which is directly dependent upon its mother church.

The priory did not escape King Henry VIII's Dissolution of the Monasteries. It was most probably dissolved in 1538, at the same time as Rocester Abbey.

== See also ==
- Rocester Abbey
