= High Sheriff of Staffordshire =

Ceremonial officer of the English county

This is a list of the sheriffs and high sheriffs of Staffordshire.

The sheriff is the oldest secular office under the Crown. The sheriff was the principal law enforcement officer in the county but over the centuries most of the responsibilities associated with the post have been transferred elsewhere or are now defunct so that its functions are now largely ceremonial. From 1204 to 1344 the High Sheriff of Staffordshire also served as Sheriff of Shropshire.

Under the provisions of the Local Government Act 1972, on 1 April 1974 the office previously known as sheriff was retitled high sheriff. The high sheriff changes every March.

== Sheriffs ==
=== 11th century ===
- 1086: Robert de Stafford
- 1094: Nicholas de Stafford

=== 12th century ===
- 1123: Robert de Stanley
- 1128–1130: Miles of Gloucester
- 1132: Nicholas de Stafford
- ? ? ?
- 1154: Maurice de Tiretei
- 1154–1159: Robert de Stafford
- 1160–1163: Alexander de Claverley (Clericus)
- 1166: Stephen de ? Beauchamp
- 1184–1188: Thomas fitzRobert fitzNoel
- 1189: Thomas de Cresswell
- 1190–1194: Hugh de Nunant
- 1195–1196: Hugo Bardulf
- 1197–1198: Hugh of Chalcombe
- 1198–1204: Geoffrey fitzPiers

=== 13th century ===
- 1204–1344 Sheriffs were sheriffs of Staffordshire and Shropshire
- 1205–1206: Thomas de Erolitto
- 1207–1214: Thomas de Erdinton
- 1215: Hervey de Stafford
- 1216–1222: Ranulf, Earl of Chester
- 1223: Hugh Despencer
- 1223: William, Earl of Salisbury
- 1224: William, bishop of Worcester
- 1227: Henry de Audley of Heighley Castle and Red Castle
- 1228: Sir Henry de Verdun (I), of Bucknall, and Darlaston near Stone
- 1228 (or before) Henry de Deneston (of Denstone)
- 1229: John de Munemowe
- 1229: Henry de Audley of Heighley Castle and Red Castle
- 1232: Robert de Haya
- 1232: Peter de Rivaux
- 1234: Robert de Haya
- 1236: John le Strange
- 1248: Thomas Corbet
- 1250–1254: Robert de Grendon
- 1255–1256: Hugh de Acoure
- 1257: Peter de Montfort
- 1258–1260: Sir William Bagot
- 1260: Sir William de Cavereswell
- 1261: James de Audley of Heighley Castle and Red Castle
- 1263: Hamo le Strange
- 1265: Robert de Grendon
- 1267: Walter de Hopton
- 1268: Sir William de Cavereswell
- 1270: James de Audley
- 1270: Urian de St. Pierre
- 1271: Hugh de Mortimer
- 1273: Ralph de Mortimer
- 1274: Robert de Trillec
- 1274: Bago de Knovill
- 1277: Walter de Hopton
- 1278–1285: Sir Roger Sprenghose
- 1285: Sir Roger de Pulesdon (or ‘Pyvelesdon’)
- 1286: Leofwin fitz Leofwin
- 1288: Sir Robert Corbet
- 1289: William de Titteley
- 1295: Ralph de Schirlegh
- 1298: Thomas Corbet

=== 14th century ===
- 1300: Ralph de Shirle
- 1300: Richard de Harley
- 1303: Walter de Beysyn
- 1304: Sir John de Acton, of Iron Acton
- 1305: John de Dene
- 1307: Sir Roger Trumwyne
- 1308: John le Strange
- 1309: Hugh de Croft
- 1309: Hugh de Audley
- 1311: Hugh de Croft
- 1312: Hugh de Audley
- 1314: Rogert de Cheygny
- 1314: Sir William de Mere
- 1315: Rogert de Cheigny (rebelled)
- 1315: Ralph de Crophull
- 1316: Sir Roger Trumwyne
- 1318: Peter de Lymesy
- 1318: Sir Robert de Grendon
- 1322: Sir John de Swynnerton
- 1322: Sir Henry de Bisshebury
- 1326: Sir William de Ercalewe
- 1327: Henry de Bisshebury
- 1327: Sir John de Hynkele
- 1330: Henry de Bisshebury
- 1330: John de Hynkele
- 1333: Sir Richard Peshall of Peshall
- 1334: Sir Richard Peshall of Peshall
- 1338: Sir Richard Peshall of Peshall
- 1341: Sir Adam Peshall of Weston under Lizard
- 1344: Robert de Harley
- 1345 onwards – the High Sheriffs were sheriffs of Staffordshire only
- 1345–61 Henry of Grosmont, 1st Earl of Derby
- 1361 Sir John Musard of Missarden
- 1361 Sir John de Gresley of Drakelow and Colton
- 1361 John de Swynnerton of Hilton
- 1362 Sir Robert de Grendon of Shenstone
- 1363 John de Perton of Perton
- 1364 Philip de Lutley of Lutley
- 1368 Sir Nicholas de Bek of Tean
- 1369 Henry Puys
- 1369 Philip de Grendon
- 1370 Sir John de Perton
- 1371 John de Gresley
- 1372 Sir Nicholas de Stafford of Throwley
- 1373 Sir John de Verdon of Darlaston (near Stone)
- 1374 Sir John Basset of Cheadle
- 1375 Sir Nicholas de Stafford of Throwley
- 1376 Sir Peter de Caverswall of High Ercall and Caverswall
- 1377 William Walsall of Rushall replaced by Brian de Cornewaill of Kynlet (also High Sheriff of Shropshire)
- 1378 William Coleson
- 1379 Sir John de Verdon of Darlaston (near Stone)
- 1380 Sir Thomas Thamhorn of Thamhorn
- 1380 Sir Adam Peshale of Weston-under-Lizard and Peshale replaced by Roger de Wyrley
- 1381–83 William Walsall of Rushall
- 1384 Sir Humphrey de Stafford of Amblecote
- 1385 Sir Robert de Mauvesyn
- 1386 Adomar de Lichfield
- 1387 Sir William Chetwynd of Ingestre Hall
- 1388 Sir Humphrey de Stafford of Southwick
- 1389 William Walsall of Rushall
- 1390 John Delves of Doddington
- 1391 John Swynnerton of Hilton
- 1392 Sir William de Shareshull of Patshull and Shareshull
- 1393 Adomar de Lichfield
- 1394 Sir Robert Fraunceys of Foremark, Derbyshire
- 1395 Sir Robert Mavesyn of Mavesyn Ridware
- 1395 John Aston of Great Haywood
- 1396 William Walsall of Rushall
- 1399 Sir William Shareshull

=== 15th century ===
- 1400: Sir Robert Mavesyn
- 1401: Sir William Newport of Abernale-by-Lichfield
- 1402: Sir Robert Fraunceys of Foremark, Derbyshire
- 1403: Sir Humphrey Stafford the younger of Amblecote
- 1404: Sir Robert Fraunceys of Foremark, Derbyshire
- 1405: Sir William Newport of Abernale-by-Lichfield
- 1406: William Walsall of Rushall
- 1407: Sir William Newport of Abernale-by-Lichfield
- 1408: Sir Robert Fraunceys of Foremark, Derbyshire
- 1409: John Delves of Delves Hall, Bramshall, near Uttoxeter – replaced by Sir Thomas Aston of Great Haywood
- 1410: Sir John Delves of Delves Hall, Doddington, Cheshire and Apedale
- 1411: Thomas Giffard of Chillington Hall
- 1412: Thomas Dethek of Derbyshire
- 1413: Sir John Bagot of Blithfield Hall
- 1414: Robert Babthorp
- 1415: Sir John Delves of Delves Hall, Bramshall, near Uttoxeter
- 1416: Sir Richard Vernon of Haddon Hall and Harlaston
- 1417: John Meverell of Throwley
- 1418: Sir William Trussell
- 1419: Humphrey Haughton of Haughton
- 1420: William Preston replaced by Sir John Delves of Delves Hall, Bramshall near Uttoxeter
- 1422: Sir Thomas Gresley of Colton
- 1423: Hugh Erdeswyk of Sandon
- 1424: Sir Nicholas Montgomery, the younger
- 1425: Sir John Bagot of Blithfield Hall
- 1426: Sir Roger Aston of Great Heywood
- 1427: Sir Richard Vernon of Haddon Hall and Harlaston
- 1428: Philip Chetwynd of Ingestre Hall
- 1430: Thomas Griffith of Wychnor replaced by Sir Nicholas Montgomery of Caverswall Castle
- 1431: Sir Roger Aston of Great Heywood
- 1432: Ralph Egerton of Betley Hall
- 1433: Thomas Stanley of Elford
- 1434: Sir Robert Strelley
- 1435: Nicholas Peshall of Horsley or Richard Peshale of Patshull
- 1436: Sir Philip Chetwynd of Ingestre Hall
- 1437: Ralph Basset of Blore Hall
- 1438: Thomas Stanley of Elford
- 1439: Sir John Gresley of Drakelow, Derbyshire
- 1440: Humphrey Lowe of Enville
- 1441: Richard Archer of Statfold
- 1442: William Mytton of Weston under Lizard
- 1443: Nicholas Montgomery of Cubley and Marston Montgomery
- 1444: Sir Thomas Blount
- 1445: Sir John Griffith of Wichnor
- 1446: Sir Humphrey Blount of Kinlet, Shropshire
- 1447: Thomas Ferrers of Tamworth
- 1449: Humphrey Swynnerton of Swynnerton
- 1450: Sir John Stanley of Elford
- 1451: Thomas Asteley of Patshull
- 1452: Sir Robert Aston of Great Heywood
- 1453: Richard Bagot of Blithfield Hall
- 1454: Thomas (or John) Cotton of Hamstall Ridware
- 1455: Sir John Delves of Doddington, Cheshire and Delves Hall, Bramshall near Uttoxeter
- 1456: John Cotes
- 1457: William Mytton of Weston-under-Lizard
- 1458: Hugh Egerton of Betley Hall
- 1459: Sir John Stanley of Elford
- 1460: Walter Wrottesley of Wrottesley
- 1461: John Harcourt of Ellenhall Hall, near Eccleshall
- 1463: Humphrey Peshall of Knightley
- 1464: Sir John Stanley of Elford
- 1465: Thomas Basset of Blore Hall
- 1466: John Harcourt of Ellenhall Hall, near Eccleshall
- 1467: John Acton
- 1468: Sir John Stanley of Elford
- 1469: Sir Randle Brereton
- 1470: Sir John Delves of Delves Hall, Bramshall near Uttoxeter (killed and replaced by Sir Henry Beaumont)
- 1471: Walter Griffith of Wychnor
- 1472: Sir William Basset of Blore Hall
- 1473: George Stanley
- 1474: Sir John Stanley of Elford
- 1475: Sir John Aston of Great Heywood
- 1476: Hugh Egerton of Betley Hall
- 1477: Richard Bagot of Blithfield
- 1478: Nicholas Montgomery of Caverswall Castle
- 1479: John Aston
- 1480: Sir William Basset of Blore Hall
- 1481: Humphrey Stanley of Pipe Ridware
- 1482: Nicholas Montgomery of Caverswall Castle
- 1483: Thomas Wortley
- 1484: Marmaduke Constable of Flamborough, Yorkshire
- 1485: Sir Humphrey Stanley of Pipe Ridware
- 1486: Henry Willoughby
- 1487: William Harper of Rushall
- 1488: Sir Hugh Peshall of Horsley
- 1489: Sir Thomas Gresley of Drakelow, Derbyshire
- 1490: Ralph Okeover of Okeover Hall
- 1491: Roger Draycot of Painsley Hall, Draycot in the Moors
- 1492: Richard Wrottesley of Wrottesley Hall
- 1493: Humphrey Stanley of Pipe Ridware
- 1494: Sir Richard (or Robert) Harcourt of Ellenhall Hall, near Eccleshall
- 1496: Sir John Draycot of Painsley Hall, Draycot in the Moors
- 1497: Sir Thomas Gresley of Drakelow, Derbyshire
- 1495: John Mytton the elder of Weston under Lizard (son of Willam, HS 1442)
- 1496: John Draycot
- 1497: Sir Thomas Gresley
- 1498: William Harpur
- 1499: John Ferrers of Tamworth

=== 16th century ===
- 1500: Sir John Aston of Tixall Hall
- 1501: John Swynnerton
- 1502: Richard Wrottesley of Wrottesley Hall
- 1502: William Harper
- 1503: Sir John Draycot of Painsley Hall, Draycot in the Moors
- 1504: William Smythe of Elford and Haselour
- 1506: Sir Lewis Bagot of Blithfield
- 1507: John Mytton of Weston under Lizard
- 1508: Sir John Aston
- 1509: Sir John Giffard of Chillington Hall
- 1510: Sir Thomas Neville
- 1511: John Egerton of Betley Hall
- 1512: John Mytton of Weston under Lizard
- 1513: Sir John Aston
- 1514: William Chetwynd of Ingestre Hall
- 1515: Sir Thomas Neville
- 1516: Richard Wrottesley of Wrottesley Hall
- 1517: John Giffard of Chillington Hall
- 1518: Ralph Egerton of Betley Hall
- 1519: Sir Edward Grey of Enville Hall
- 1520: Sir Lewis Bagot of Blithfield
- 1522: Sir John Giffard of Chillington Hall replaced by William Smyth
- 1523: Edward Littleton (died 1558) of Pillaton Hall
- 1524: Sir Edward Grey of Enville Hall
- 1525: Sir John Giffard of Chillington Hall
- 1526: John Blount of Kinlet
- 1527: John Vernon
- 1528: Sir Edward Aston (died 1568) of Tixall Hall
- 1529: Thomas Giffard of Chillington Hall
- 1530: Sir John Giffard
- 1531: Richard Astley replaced by Walter Wrottesley of Wrottesley Hall
- 1532: John Vernon
- 1533: Sir Philip Draycot of Painsley Hall, Draycot in the Moors
- 1534: Sir Edward Aston (died 1568) of Tixall Hall
- 1535: William Chetwynd of Ingestre Hall
- 1536: John Dudley
- 1537: Sir George Gresley of Drakelow, Derbyshire
- 1538: John Vernon
- 1539: Sir Edward Littleton (died 1558) of Pillaton Hall
- 1540: Sir Edward Aston (died 1568) of Tixall Hall
- 1541: Sir John Gyfford
- 1542: Sir William Basset of Blore Hall
- 1543: Thomas Fitzherbert of Norbury Hall
- 1544: Sir George Gresley of Drakelow, Derbyshire
- 1545: Sir John Harcourt of Ellenhall Hall, near Eccleshall
- 1546: James Leveson of Lilleshall Abbey, Shropshire and Trentham Hall
- 1547: Francis Meverell of Throwley
- 1548: John Fleetwood of Calwich Abbey, Ellastone
- 1549: Sir William Sneyd of Bradwell
- 1550: Edward Littleton of Pillaton Hall
- 1551: Sir William Basset of Blore Hall
- 1552: Sir George Blount of Nether Hall, Burton On Trent
- 1553: Thomas Giffard of Chillington Hall
- 1554: Thomas Fitzherbert of Norbury Hall
- 1555: Sir Philip Draycot of Painsley Hall, Draycot in the Moors
- 1556: Sir Edward Aston (died 1568) of Tixall Hall
- 1557: Sir John Harcourt of Ellenhall Hall, near Eccleshall
- 1558: Sir William Sneyd of Bradwell
- 1559: Humphrey Welles of Hoar Cross
- 1560: Sir Ralph Bagnoll
- 1561: John Leveson of Wolverhampton
- 1562: Sir William Gresley of Drakelow Hall, Derbyshire
- 1563: Edward Littleton of Pillaton Hall
- 1564: Ralph Okeover of Okeover Hall
- 1565: John Wrottesley of Wrottesley Hall
- 1566: Simon Harcourt of Ellenhall Hall, near Eccleshall
- 1567: John Skrymsher of Mere, near Eccleshall
- 1568: John Fleetwood of Calwich Abbey, Ellastone
- 1569: Richard Bagot of Blithfield
- 1570: Sir Walter Aston of Tixall Hall
- 1571: Thomas Trentham of Rocester Priory
- 1572: Sir George Blount of Nether Hall, Burton on Trent
- 1573: John Giffard of Chillington Hall
- 1574: Thomas Whorwood of Stourton Castle and Compton
- 1575: Ralph Adderley of Coton Manor
- 1576: Ralph Sneyd of Bradwell
- 1577: Richard Bagot of Blithfield
- 1578: John Chetwynd of Ingestre Hall
- 1579: Thomas Trentham of Rocester Priory
- 1580: Sir Walter Aston of Tixall Hall
- 1581: Edward Lyttleton of Pillaton Hall
- 1582: John Grey of Enville Hall
- 1583: Thomas Gresley of Drakelow.
- 1585: Philip Okeover of Okeover Hall
- 1586: Walter Leveson of Lilleshall Abbey, Shropshire and Trentham Hall
- 1587: Sir William Basset of Blore Hall
- 1588: John Bowes
- 1589: Robert Stamford
- 1590: Sir Edward Aston (died 1598) of Tixall Hall
- 1591: Thomas Leveson of Wolverhampton
- 1592: Sir Francis Trentham of Rocester Priory
- 1593: Edward Lyttleton of Pillaton Hall
- 1594: Henry Griffith of Wychnor
- 1595: Ralph Sneyd of Bradwell
- 1596: Thomas Whorwood of Stourton Castle and Compton
- 1597: William Crompton of The Priory, Stone
- 1598: Walter Wrottesley of Wrottesley Hall
- 1599: Walter Bagot of Blithfield

=== 17th century ===
- 1600: William Chetwynd of Ingestre Hall.
- 1601: William Skeffington of Fisherwick
- 1602: Edward Leigh
- 1603: Walter Bagot (or Baghott) of Blithfield
- 1604: Sir William Whorwood of Sandwell Hall
- 1606: Sir Edward Brabazon (later Baron Ardee)
- 1607: Sir Walter Chetwynd of Ingestre Hall.
- 1608: Thomas Peshall of Horsley replaced by James Skrymsher of Aqualate Hall, Mere, near Eccleshall
- 1609: Walter Heveningham of Pipe Hall, near Lichfield
- 1610: Sir Simon Weston of St John's
- 1611: Sir Francis Trentham of Rocester Priory
- 1612: Thomas Meverell of Throwley
- 1613: Sir Edward Littleton of Pillaton Hall
- 1614: Sir Richard Fleetwood Bt of Calwich Abbey and Wootton Lodge, Ellastone
- 1615: Sir John Peshall Bt. of Horsley
- 1616: Sir John Offley of Madeley Manor
- 1617: Sir Hugh Wrottesley of Wrottesley Hall
- 1618: Sir Thomas Skrymsher of Aqualate Hall, Mere, near Eccleshall
- 1619: Henry Leigh of Rushall
- 1620: Edward Windsor
- 1621: Ralph Sneyd of Bradwell
- 1622: William Comberford
- 1623: William Skeffington of Fisherwick
- 1624: Edward Stanford of Perry Hall, Birmingham
- 1625: Thomas Parkes of Willingsworth
- 1626: Hervey Bagot of Blithfield Hall.
- 1627: William Bowyer of Knypersley Hall
- 1628: John Bowes of Elford
- 1629: John Cootes of Callowhill
- 1630: William Wollaston
- 1631: Thomas Broughton of Broughton Hall.
- 1632: Sir Thomas Whorwood of Sandwell Hall
- 1633: Sir Henry Griffith, 1st Baronet of Wichnor
- 1634: Humphrey Wyrley of Hamstead
- 1635: Richard Pyott of Streethay
- 1636: Edward Littleton of Pillaton Hall
- 1637: Sir John Skeffington Bt. of Fisherwick
- 1638: Sir John Skrymsher of Norbury Manor, Eccleshall
- 1639: John Bellot of Great Moreton Hall, Cheshire
- 1640: John Agarde
- 1641: Sir Edward Mosley, 1st Baronet of Rolleston Hall
- 1642: ??
- 1643 Colonel Simon Rugeley (d. 1665) of Shenstone and Callingwood
- 1644 ??
- 1645: Edward Mainwaring (d. 1647) of Whitmore Hall
- 1646: Thomas Kynnersley of Loxley Hall
- 1647: Walter Chetwynd(d. 1669) of Ingestre Hall.
- 1648: Edward Seabright of Prestwood
- 1649: John Offley of Madeley
- 1650: William Jolley of Leek
- 1651: Gerrard Skrymsher of High Offley
- 1652: Robert Ducy of Little Aston
- 1653: Brome Whorwood of Sandwell Hall
- 1654: Thomas Wilbraham
- 1655: Thomas Chetwynd of Ingestre Hall
- 1656: Rowland Cotton of Crakemarsh
- 1657: Jonathan Cope
- 1658: Humble Ward, 1st Baron Ward of Birmingham.
- 1659: Humble Ward, 1st Baron Ward of Birmingham and John Shelton of West Bromwich
- 1660: Brian Broughton of Broughton Hall (created baronet 1661)
- 1661: John Bellot of Great Moreton Hall, Cheshire (later Sir John Bellot Bt).
- 1662: Sir John Bowyer, 1st Baronet of Knypersley Hall.
- 1663: William Jolliffe of Caverswall Castle
- 1663: John Offley of Madeley Manor
- 1663: William Sneyd
- 1664: Sir John Wyrley of Hampstead
- 12 November 1665: Francis Leveson Fowler
- 7 November 1666: Sir Walter Wrottesley, 2nd Baronet, of Wrottesley Hall
- 6 November 1667: John Whitehall, of Park Hall, near Leigh
- 6 November 1668: Walter Chetwynd, of Ingestre Hall
- 25 November 1668: Edwin Skrymsher, of Aqualate Hall
- 11 November 1669: Rowland Cotton, of Crakemarsh
- 4 November 1670: Richard Cresswell, of Barnhurst
- 9 November 1671: Henry Gough, of Bushbury
- 11 November 1672: William Lawton, of Lawton Hall, Cheshire
- 12 November 1673: Thomas Jolley, of Leek
- 5 November 1674: John Eynge
- 1674: John Wilson, of Stafford
- 15 November 1675: Thomas Goring, of Kingston
- 1675: William Sneyd of Keele Hall.
- 10 November 1676: Walter Scrimshaw, of Onslow
- 18 November 1676: Henry Stone, of Walsall
- 6 January 1676/7: Simon Unwin
- 15 November 1677: William Batch,
- 23 November 1677: Henry Grey, of Enville
- 1 December 1677: William Cotton, of Crakemarsh
- 21 December 1677: Sir John Bowyer, 2nd Baronet, of Knypersley Hall
- 16 January 1677/8: John Stone, of Walsall
- 17 January 1677/8: Richard Amphlett, of Clent
- 14 November 1678: Sir Thomas Bellot, 2nd Baronet
- 23 November 1678: Edward Mainwaring, of Whitmore Hall
- 13 November 1679: John Offley, of Madeley
- 1680: John Whitehall of Hamstall Ridware
- 1680: Edward Littleton of Pillaton Hall
- 1682: Sir Charles Skrymsher of Norbury Manor, Eccleshall
- 1683: Sir --- Wrotchley (Sir Walter Wrottesley, Bt?) replaced by Thomas Rudyard of Rudyard then Matthew Floyer of Hints Hall
- 1683: William Inge of Thorpe Constantine Hall
- 1684: Richard Verney
- 1684: Walter Chetwynd of Ingestre Hall
- 1685: Jonathan Cope of Ranton Abbey
- 1686: Sir Walter Wrottesley, Bt of Wrottesley Hall
- 1687: Philip Draycot of Painsley Hall, Draycot in the Moors
- 1688: Thomas Fowke replaced by Francis Lawley
- 1689: Francis Eld, then William Cotton, then William Ward
- 1690: John Newton
- 1691: William Jolliffe of Bothams, Caverswall, then Henry Vernon, then Sir John Chetwode, 1st Baronet of Oakley Hall. Staffordshire
- 1692: Grosvenor Dyson replaced by William Jolliffe
- 1693: John Chetwood of Oakley replaced by Richard Bagnall
- 1694: William Trafford of Swythamley Hall replaced by John Taylor
- 1695: John Younger replaced by John Chetwynd of Ingestre Hall
- 1696: William Murrall
- 1697: John Bowyer of Knypersley
- 1698: John Chetwode (later Sir John Chetwode Bt) of Oakley Hall. Staffordshire followed by Walter Landor
- 1699: Thomas Nabbs replaced by Oswald Mosley of Rolleston Hall

=== 18th century ===
- 1700: Thomas Nabbs replaced by Oswald Mosley of Rolleston Hall
- 1701: Benjamin Jolliffe of Cofton Hall, Worcestershire
- 1702: Thomas Nabbs
- 1702: John Babington of Curborough Hall
- 1703: John Amfleet, replaced by Humphrey Hodges
- 1704: Rowland and Thomas Okeover of Okeover Hall
- 1705: Matthew Ducie Moreton (later 1st Baron Moreton)
- 1705: Leigh Brooke of Haselour Hall
- 1706: Hamp. Hedges
- 1707: Thomas Crompton of The Priory, Stone, replaced by William Trafford of Swythamley Hall
- 1708: James Wood
- 1709: Edward Mainwaring of Whitmore Hall
- 1710: Edmund Arblaster of Arblaster Hall, Brocton
- 1711: Walter Moseley of The Mere, Enville.
- 1712: Leigh Brooke of Haselour Hall,
- 1713: Sir Edward Littleton, Bt of Pillaton Hall
- 1714: Zachary Babington of Curborough Hall replaced by Harry Grey, replaced by Edward Mainwaring of Whitmore Hall, replaced by Oswald Moseley of Rolleston Hall
- 1715: Weston Bailey of Harborne, replaced by Thomas Birch of Harborne
- 1716: John Craddock of Audley, replaced by John Turton of Alrewas
- 1717: Joseph Amphlett, replaced by Thomas Whitby of Haywood Abbey
- 1718: Charles Chadwick
- 1719: Thomas Brown of Caverswall
- 1720: Edward Browne of Caverswall
- 1721: Robert Bosville of Biana, replaced by Ralph Sneyd of Keele Hall
- 1721: Humphrey Hodgetts
- 1722: Henry Goring
- 1724: Zachary Babington of Curborough Hall
- 1725: Richard Scott
- 1726: Richard Townsend
- 1726: Edward Bird, replaced by William Robins then Fowke Hussey
- 1728: Edward Wilson of Cank
- 1728: Samuel Newton
- 1729: John Arden of Longcroft
- 1730: William Robins
- 1731: Ralph Williamson
- 1732: John Dolphin of The Moss, Shenstone, replaced by Warren Faulkener
- 1733: John Hodgetts of Shutt End, Kingswinford
- 1734: Craven Kynnersley of Loxley Hall
- 1735: Charles Baldwin
- 1736: Samuel Clark replaced by Ralph Adderley of Coton Hall.
- 1737: Thomas Jolliffe of Cofton Hall, Worcestershire
- 1738: Richard Fowler of Harnage Grange, Shropshire
- 1739: Theodore William Inge of Thorpe Constantine Hall
- 1740: John Dolphin of The Moss, Shenstone
- 1741: William Murrhall
- 1742: Charles Chadwick, replaced by Sir Robert Lawley Bt of Canwell Priory
- 1743: Thomas Webb
- 1744: Samuel Hellier of Seawall, Featherstone (more usually associated with the Wodehouse, Wombourne)
- 1745: Charles Bosville of Biana
- 1746: George Hunt of Rocester
- 1747: John Jervis the younger of Darlaston
- 1748: John Wyrley of Birch
- 1749: Edward Busby of Barton-under-Needwood
- 1750: Henry Vernon of Hilton Hall
- 1752: Thomas Bradney of Penne
- 1753: Richard Drakeford of Castlechurch
- 1754: Thomas Mills of Barlaston Hall
- 1755: John Burridge Leigh of Rushall
- 1756: John Touchet Chetwode (later Sir John Chetwode Bt of Oakley Hall).
- 1757: Walter Acton Moseley of The Mere, Enville.
- 1758: Sir Richard Whitworth MP of Batchacre Grange, Adbaston
- 1759: Sir Nigel Gresley, 6th Baronet of Knypersley Hall.
- 1760: John Dolphin of The Moss, Shenstone.
- 1761: Jeremiah Smith of Fenton Hall
- 1762: Sir Edward Littleton Bt of Pillaton Hall.
- 1763: John Sneyd of Bishton
- 1764: William Armet of Heaton
- 1765: John Hodgetts of Shutt End, Kingswinford.
- 1766: William Inge of Thorpe Constantine Hall
- 1767: Edward Mainwaring, of Whitmore Hall
- 1768: Francis Eld of Seighford Hall
- 1769: Clement Kynnersley of Loxley Hall
- 1770: John Marsh of Wombourne
- 1771: Thomas Hoo of Great Barr Hall.
- 1772: Rev. Sir Thomas Broughton Bt of Broughton Hall
- 1773: Thomas Whitby of Creswell Hall and Hales Hall, Cheadle
- 1774: Nathaniel Barrett of Oaken Hall
- 1775: John Williamson of Stafford
- 1776: William Tennant of Little Aston Hall
- 1777: John Turton of Orgreave Hall
- 1778: John Swinfen of Swinfen Hall
- 1779: Sir Edward Walhouse Okeover of Okeover Hall
- 1780: Ralph Floyer of Hints Hall.
- 1781: Philip Keay of Abbots Bromley, replaced by John Jarvis of Darlaston
- 1782: Charles Tollett of Betley Hall
- 1783: Richard Gildart of Norton Canes
- 1784: Sir John Edensor Heathcote of Longton Hall.
- 1785: Thomas Stevenson of Stafford
- 1786: Thomas Parker of Park Hall, Caverswall
- 1787: Thomas Whieldon of Fenton Hall
- 1788: Thomas Fletcher of Betley Court (later Sir Thomas Fletcher, 1st Baronet)
- 1789: Thomas Leversage Fowler of Pendeford Hall
- 1790: John Sparrow of Bishton
- 1791: Moreton Walhouse of Hatherton Hall
- 1792: Simon Debank of Leeke
- 1793: George Molineux of Molineux House, Wolverhampton.
- 1794: Matthew Boulton of Soho House, Handsworth, then in Staffordshire
- 1795: Thomas Swinnerton of Butterton Hall, Staffordshire
- 1796: Henry Vernon of Hilton Hall
- 1797: John Gough of Old Fallings and of Perry Hall, replaced by Sir Robert Lawley Bt later Baron Wenlock of Canwell Hall
- 1798: Richard Dyott of Freeford Hall
- 1799: Joseph Scott of Great Barr Hall, later Sir Joseph Scott, 1st Baronet

=== 19th century ===
- 5 February 1800: Haughton Farmer Okeover, of Okeover Hall
- 11 February 1801: Thomas Bainbridge, of Woodseat
- 3 February 1802: Robert Parker, of Park Hall, Caverswall
- 3 February 1803: George Birch, of Hamstead
- 1 February 1804: Richard Jesson, of West Bromwich
- 6 February 1805: John Heyliger Burt, of Colton House
- 1 February 1806: William Phillips Inge, of Thorpe Constantine Hall
- 4 February 1807: George Briscoe, of Summer Hill
- 18 February 1807: John Lane, of Kings Bromley
- 24 February 1808: William Cary, of Cannock
- 6 February 1809: Theophilus Levett, of Wychnor Park
- 31 January 1810: Henry Webb, of Forebridge
- 8 February 1811: James Beech, of the Shaw
- 24 January 1812: Thomas Mottershaw, of Silkmore House
- 10 February 1813: Walter Sneyd, of Keele Hall
- 4 February 1814: Sir Oswald Mosley, 2nd Baronet of Rolleston Hall
- 13 February 1815: Henry Crockett, of Little Onn Hall
- 1816: John Smith of Elmhurst Hall
- 1817: Thomas Kirkpatrick Hall of Holly Bush
- 1818: Edward Trafford Nicholls of Swithamley Hall
- 1819: Jesse Watts-Russell of Ilam Hall
- 1820: Moreton Walhouse of Hatherton Hall
- 1821: Francis Eld of Seighford
- 1822: Phineas Hussey of Wyrley Grove, Little Wyrley
- 1823: James Horden of Oxley Manor
- 1824: Edward Sneyd of Byrkley Lodge
- 1825: Sir George Pigot, 3rd Baronet of Patshull Hall
- 1826: John Burton Philips of The Heath House, near Checkley
- 1827: Hugo Charles Meynell of Hoar Cross Hall
- 1828: John Atkinson of Maple Hayes, near Lichfield
- 1829: John Bateman of Knypersley Hall
- 1830: Thomas Twemlow of Peats Wood
- 1831: Thomas FitzHerbert of Swinnerton Park
- 1832: Sir Thomas Fletcher Fenton Boughey, 3rd Baronet of Aqualate Park
- 1833: Thomas Kinnersly of Clough Hall, near Kidsgrove
- 1834: Hugh Henshall Williamson, of Greenway Bank
- 1835: Edward Monckton of Somerford, Brewood
- 1836: Thomas Hawe Parker of Park Hall, Caverswall
- 1837: George Thomas Whitgreave of Moseley Court.
- 1838: John Stevenson Salt of Weeping Cross
- 1839: William Moore of Wychdom Lodge
- 1840: Henry John Pye of Clifton Hall, Clifton Campville
- 1841: Thomas Cartwright of Hill Hall
- 1842: John Edwards Piercy of Rowley Regis
- 1843: John Shawe Manley of Manley Hall, near Lichfield
- 1844: Ralph Sneyd (1793–1870) of Keele Hall
- 1845: Charles Smith Forster of Lysways Hall, Longdon.
- 1846: John Levett of Wychnor Park and Packington Hall
- 1847: Sir Edward Dolman Scott, 2nd Baronet of Great Barr Hall
- 1848: Frederick Gough of Perry Hall
- 1849: Charles Arkwright of Dunstall Hall
- 1850: Josiah Spode IV of Armitage Park
- 1851: John Barker of Wolverhampton
- 1852: John Ashford Wise of Clayton Hall
- 1853: Edward Buller of Dilhorne Hall
- 1854: John Davenport of Westwood Hall
- 1855: Samuel Pole Shawe of Maple Hayes
- 1856: Richard Dyott of Freeford Hall
- 1857: Edward Swinfen Parker Jervis of Little Aston Hall
- 1858: Philip Williams of Tipton
- 1859: William Davenport of Maer
- 1860: Richard Howard Haywood of Brownhills Villa, Burslem
- 1861: John William Phillips of Heybridge
- 1862: Henry Killick of Walton Hall
- 1863: Thomas Bagnall, of West Bromwich.
- 1864: George Briscoe of Elmhurst Hall, Lichfield was initially appointed, but was replaced by Thomas Thorneycroft, of Tottenhall Wood, Wolverhampton
- 1865: Smith Child of Stallington Hall
- 1866: Ralph Thomas Adderley of Barlaston Hall.
- 1867: Henry Charles Vernon of Hilton Hall
- 1868: James Timmins Chance later Sir James Timmins Chance, 1st Bt. of Handsworth
- 1869: Colin Minton Campbell of Wood Seat, Uttoxeter
- 1870: John Hartley of Wolverhampton
- 1871: Charles Walter Lyon of Silver Hill.
- 1872: Henry Ward of Oaklands
- 1873: William Mander Sparrow of Penn Hall
- 1874: Sir Tonman Mosley, 3rd Baronet of Rolleston Hall
- 1875: John Nock Bagnall of The Moss, Shenstone
- 1876: Richard Holt Briscoe of Somerford Hall
- 1877: Henry John Wentworth Hodgetts-Foley of Prestwood Hall, Stourbridge
- 1878: Sir John Hardy Bt of Dunstall Hall
- 1879: Augustus East Manley of Manley Hall near Lichfield
- 1880: Walter Williams of Sugnall Hall, Eccleshall
- 1881: Augustus Cholmondeley Gough Calthorpe of Perry Hall, later 6th Baron Calthorpe
- 1882: John Robinson of Westwood Hall, Leek
- 1883: Alfred Charles Duncombe of Calwich Abbey, Ellastone
- 1884: Abraham Briggs Foster of Canwell Hall
- 1885: Robert Heath of Biddulph Grange
- 1886: James Chadwick of Hints Hall
- 1887: George Fox of Elmhurst Hall, Lichfield
- 1888: Frederick Charles Perry of Dunston Hall
- 1889: Albert Octavius Worthington of Maple Hayes, near Lichfield
- 1890: Samuel Lipscomb Seckham of Whittington Old Hall near Lichfield
- 1891: William Frederick Inge, of Thorpe Constantine Hall, Tarnworth
- 1892: Ralph Sneyd of Keele Hall
- 1893: Sir Reginald Hardy Bt of Dunstall Hall
- 1894: Sir Oswald Mosley, 4th Baronet of Rolleston Hall
- 1895: Francis Monckton of Stretton Hall
- 1896: Henry Arthur Wiggin of Metchley Grange, Harborne (later Sir Henry Wiggin, 2nd Baronet)
- 1897: William Bealey Harrison of Aldershaw, near Lichfield
- 1898: Sir Thomas Fletcher Fenton Boughey Bt of Aqualate Hall
- 1899: Augustus Leveson Vernon of Hilton Hall

=== 20th century ===
- 1900: Sir Charles Forster, of Lysways Hall, Rugeley
- 1901: Richard Powell Cooper of Shenstone Court (later Sir Richard Cooper,1st Baronet)
- 1902: Richard Pirie Copeland of Kibblestone Hall, Stone
- 1903: Charles Tertius Mander of the Mount, Tettenhall Wood (later Sir Charles Mander Bt).
- 1904: Robert Halstead Hargreaves of Knightley Court, Eccleshall
- 1905: Robert Heath of Biddulph Grange, Congleton
- 1906: Thomas William Twyford of Whitmore Hall, Newcastle-under-Lyme
- 1907: Colonel Michael AW Swinfen Broun of Swinfen Hall
- 1908: Loftus Balfour Moreton of Moseley Old Hall, Wolverhampton
- 1909: Sir Thomas Anderson Salt of Chatcull, Eccleshall
- 1910: Frederick George Lindley Meynell of Hoar Cross Hall
- 1911: William Robert Parker Jervis of Meaford Hall.
- 1912: William Moat of Johnson Hall, Eccleshall
- 1913: George Harry Holcroft of The Grange, Stourbridge
- 1914: John Fletcher Twemlow Royds of The Hill, Sandbach, Cheshire
- 1915: William Warrington Dobson of Seighford Hall
- 1916: Sir Arthur Nicholson of Highfield Hall, Leek
- 1917: George Fletcher Fletcher-Twemlow of Betley Court
- 1918: George Elliot Meakin of Creswell Hall
- 1919: Francis Alfred Bolton of Moor Court, Oakamoor
- 1920: Albert Baldwin Bantock of Merridale House, Wolverhampton
- 1921: Geoffrey Le Mesurier Mander of Wightwick Manor
- 1922: Sir Graham Percival Heywood of Dove Leys, Rocester
- 1923: John Twigg Homer of Dormston, Sedgeley
- 1924: Lt Col Arthur Faulkner Nicholson of Shirburn House, Leek
- 1925: Maj Bertram Hardy of Dunstall Hall
- 1926: Maj. Charles Arthur Mander (later Sir Charles Mander Bt) of Kilsall Hall, Tong
- 1927: Lt Col William Edward Harrison of Wychnor Hall
- 1928: John Edwin Mitchell of Cape Hill, Smethwick
- 1929: Francis Hamilton Wedgwood of Barlaston Lea
- 1930: Lt Col Richard Fowler-Butler of Pendeford Hall, Wolverhampton
- 1931: James Thompson of Ludstone Hall, Claverley
- 1932: Sir Francis L'Estrange Joseph, 1st Baronet of The Gables, Alsager
- 1933: James Cadman of Walton Hall, Staffordshire
- 1934: George Herbert Sankey of Ashley Abbotts, Bridgnorth, Salop
- 1935: Adolph Henry Charles Wenger of Trentham Priory
- 1936: George Henry Downing of Clayton Lodge, Newcastle under Lyme
- 1937: Reginald Francis Percy Monckton of Stretton Hall.
- 1938: Stephen John Thompson of Stanley Old Hall, Bridgnorth
- 1939: Richard Ronald John Copeland of Kibblestone Hall, near Stone
- 1940: William Edward Carter of Eccleshall Castle
- 1941: John Leslie Swanson
- 1942: Lt-Col. William J. Kent
- 1943: Major William E. Melles
- 1944: Albert H.S. Hinchcliffe
- 1945: Ernest Byfield Hall
- 1946: Lt-Col. Harold Bantock Sankey of Whiston Hall, Albrighton
- 1947: William John Talbot
- 1948: Henry John Bostock
- 1949: Charles Cyril Dennis of Park House, Oakley
- 1950: George Ronald Sankey of Gay Hills, Lower Penn, Wolverhampton
- 1951: James Donald Eadie of Park Mount, Wombourne
- 1952: Gerald Fenwick Haszard of Milford Hall.
- 1953: James Forrester Bostock of Barn Bank
- 1954: Rafe Gordon Dutton Cavenagh-Mainwaring of Whitmore Hall.
- 1955: Edward Walter Thompson of Gatacre Park
- 1956: Walter William Marsh of Woodfield
- 1957: Richard Charles Eld of Cooksland House, Seighford
- 1958: Godfrey Stafford Bostock of Tixall
- 1959: John Henry Neville Thompson of Farmcote House
- 1960: Martin Alfred Butts Bolton of Croxden Abbey
- 1961: Charles Kenneth Stott
- 1962: Sir Charles Marcus Mander, 3rd Baronet, of The Dippons Farm, Tettenhall
- 1963: William Anthony Adams of Lea Head Manor, Aston, Shropshire
- 1964: William Herbert Harrison of Wychnor Hall
- 1965: Thomas Hassal Gardner of Bishton Lodge, Wolseley Bridge
- 1966: George David Inge-Innes-Lillingston of Thorpe Constantine Hall
- 1967: Charles Geoffrey Michael Boote of Croxtonbank House, near Eccleshall
- 1968: Alan Edward Stott
- 1969: Lt-Col. W.P.D. Featherstone
- 1970: John David Marsh
- 1971: Richard Somers Angus Hardy
- 1972: Peter Greenville Wild
- 1973: George Harold Michael Stanley

== High sheriffs ==
=== 20th century ===
- 1974: Thomas Mark Carter
- 1975: Alan Stobart Monckton of Stretton Hall
- 1976: Major James Appleton Hawley
- 1977: Guy Cavenagh-Mainwaring of Whitmore Hall
- 1978: Major Jacinth Rodney Haszard of Milford Hall
- 1979: Christopher J. Nanscawen Williams
- 1980: Col. William A. Franks Sargeant
- 1981: Cecil H. Stafford Northcote
- 1982: Lt-Col. David J Keeling German
- 1983: Richard B. Kennedy Dyott
- 1984: John Hugh Leigh
- 1985: Anthony Paul Bamford
- 1986: Lt-Col. Michael C. Bagshaw
- 1987: Nicholas Stephen G. Bostock
- 1988: David Gerald Stern
- 1989: Derek Harold Field
- 1990: Major Charles R.M. Boote
- 1991: John Lewis Jones
- 1992: Roger Edward Whitfield
- 1993: Charles Herbert Mitchell
- 1994: Col. Michael P.K. Beatty
- 1995: Joanna Bird Monckton (nee Bird) of Stretton Hall
- 1996: Sampson Eric Mitchell
- 1997: Gerald Raymond Tams
- 1998: Arthur Edward Robin Manners
- 1999: David Edward Dunn Johnson of Chartley Hall

=== 21st century ===
- 2000: David Eliot
- 2001: Deborah Chetwynd-Talbot, The Countess of Shrewsbury & Talbot, of Wanfield Hall, Uttoxeter.
- 2002: Michael Hurdle
- 2003: Sir Stanley Clarke of Dunstall Hall near Burton upon Trent
- 2004: Dorothy Sheila Carver née Tildesley
- 2005: Francis Fitzherbert, 15th Baron Stafford of Swynnerton Hall
- 2006: Angela Tams
- 2007: Graham Stow
- 2008: Catherine A Evans of Stowe by Chartley
- 2009: Richard Byrd Levett Haszard of Milford Hall
- 2010: Ian James Dudson of Stoke-on-Trent
- 2011: Simon William Clarke of Dunstall Hall, near Burton on Trent
- 2012: A Sarah Elsom of Rugeley
- 2013: Susan Caroline Inge-Innes-Lillingston of Tamworth
- 2014: Ann E Fisher of Market Drayton
- 2015: John William Leavesley of Alrewas
- 2016: Colonel David L Leigh of Hamstall Ridware
- 2017: Humphrey David Sneyd Scott-Moncrieff
- 2018: Philippa Jane Gee
- 2019: Ashley Edward Brough of Uttoxeter
- 2020: Charles James Bagot Jewitt of Admaston
- 2021: James Irvine Hinchliffe Friend
- 2022: Clarence Bennie Robinson
- 2023: Victoria Louise Hawley
- 2024: Julia Mitchell, of Stone
- 2025: John Timothy Joseph Gillow, of Stone
- 2026: Pritpal Singh Nagi, Newcaste-under-Lyme
