= Theophilus Levett =

British attorney and Staffordshire politician (1693–1746)

- Born: 1693; Austerson, Cheshire, England
- Died: 1746 (aged 52–53); Lichfield, England
- Occupation: barrister
- Known for: Town clerk (Steward) of Lichfield 1721–1746
- Spouse: Mary Levett (née Babington)
- Children: 3, including John Levett

Theophilus Levett (1693–1746) was an attorney and early town clerk of Lichfield, Staffordshire, a prominent Staffordshire politician and landowner, and a member of a thriving Lichfield social and intellectual circle which included his friends Samuel Johnson, the physician Erasmus Darwin, the writer Anna Seward and the actor David Garrick, among others.

== Life ==
Theophilus Levett was married to Mary Babington, the daughter of Zachary Babington, a lawyer, High Sheriff of Staffordshire. Levett and his wife later inherited Babington properties at Curburough, Whittington and elsewhere in Staffordshire. The Babington family had been prominent in the Lichfield Cathedral for two centuries and as local barristers. Dr. Zachary Babington, great-grandfather of barrister Zachary, was precentor of Lichfield Cathedral, as well as diocesan chancellor, and died at his estate Curborough Hall in 1613.

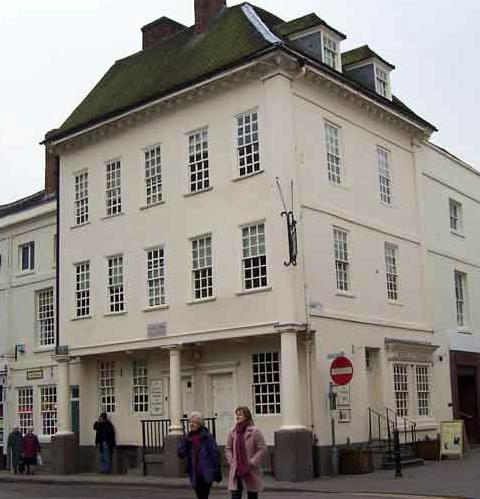
Samuel Johnson home on Lichfield's Market Street. Theophilus Levett loaned his 31-year-old friend Johnson £80 secured by a mortgage on the home where Johnson's mother lived

An early friend of Samuel Johnson's before the author went off to Oxford, Levett later assumed the mortgage on Johnson's mother's Lichfield home for £80 on 31 January 1739, when Johnson was 31 years old, a debt that Theophilus Levett's son John continued to carry after his father's death. Hardpressed for cash, Johnson and his mother had only one substantial asset after the death of his father, who had invested in a parchment-making operation that failed. Levett offered Johnson favourable terms and advanced him ready money in return for holding the mortgage, easing Johnson's financial bind. Theophilus Levett and Johnson were frequent correspondents, and they remained lifelong friends, despite Levett's occasional inquiries about overdue payments.

Theophilus Levett had St. John's House (later Yeomanry House) opposite St. John's hospital built for himself before 1732. Levett's new home "replaced a house known in 1577 as Culstubbe Hall, the home of the physician Sir John Floyer in the late 17th century," according to the Victoria County History of Staffordshire. The Levett home was demolished in 1925.

=== Descendants ===
Theophilus Levett's daughter Anne was, according to Anna Seward, the early paramour of actor David Garrick. Garrick, wrote Seward, "was the lover of her early youth. When he quitted Lichfield to become a theatrical adventurer, he had her promise to be his the instant his situation became profitable." The romance was not to be: Anna Levett ultimately married her cousin Rev. Richard Levett of West Wycombe, Buckinghamshire. The episode prompted Seward to pen her poem Portrait of Miss Levett about the fickle Lichfield beauty.

The descendants of Theophilus Levett and his wife Mary Babington went on to become prominent in Lichfield and Staffordshire for more than two centuries, serving as High Sheriffs of Staffordshire, Members of Parliament, investors in Matthew Boulton's Soho Manufactory at Birmingham, as well as rectors of the local church at Whittington and elsewhere. Several streets in today's Lichfield are named for the early town clerk and his family. The family is of Anglo-Norman descent and originated in Sussex, arriving in Staffordshire from Cheshire. Theophilus Levett was named for Theophilus Hastings, 7th Earl of Huntingdon, whose wife the Countess of Huntingdon was Levett's godmother.

== Career ==
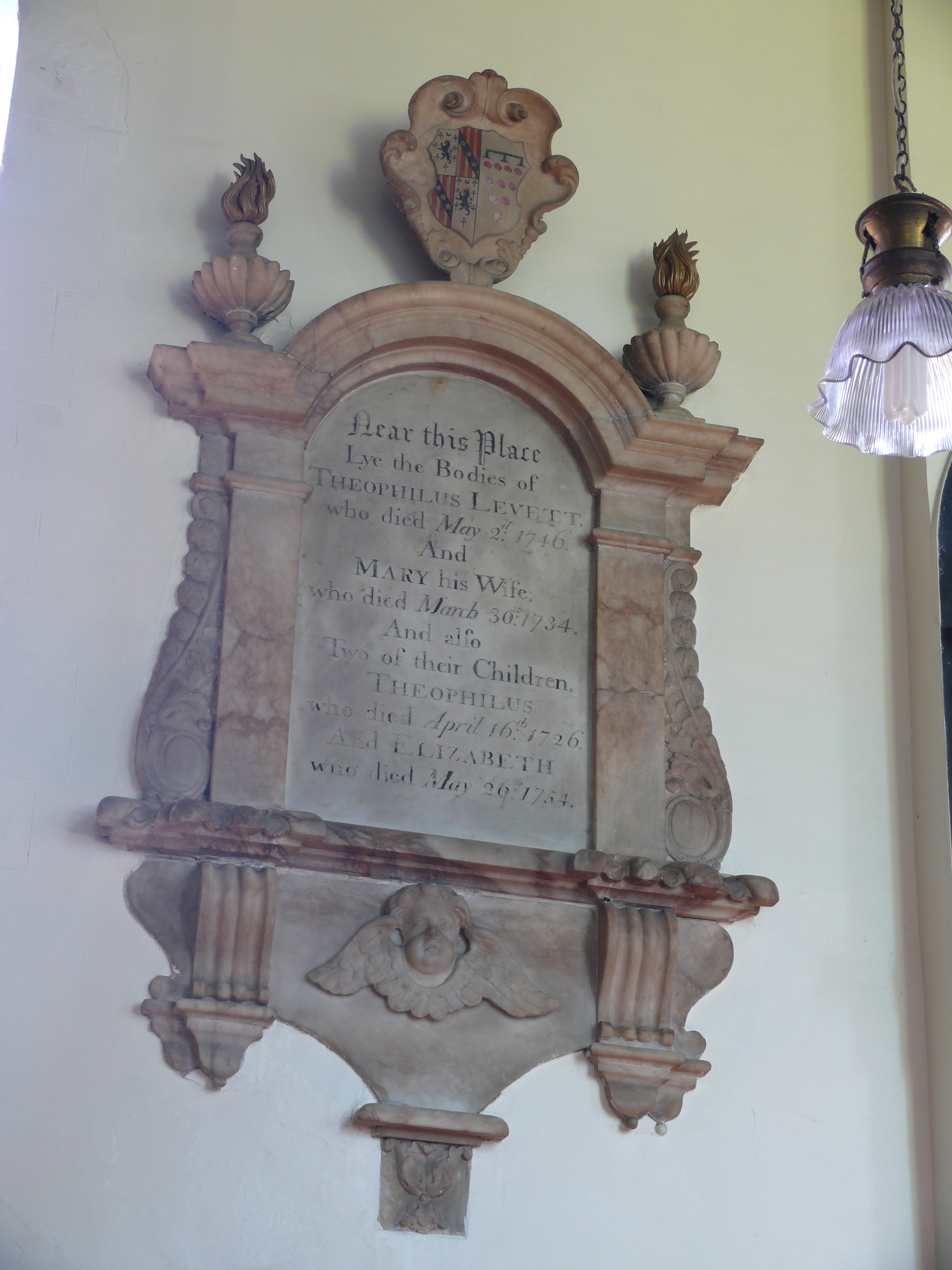
Alabaster monument to Theophilus and Mary Levett, St Giles Church, Whittington, Staffordshire

Theophilus Levett served as Steward (town clerk) of Lichfield from 1721 to 1746, during which time he was a prominent player in the town's political affairs, occasionally narrowly averting political disaster. In 1718 and 1721 Levett narrowly escaped prosecution for sedition after declaring his Jacobite sympathies. After Levett retracted his statements, the matter was dropped but not without a storm of controversy.

The imbroglio began in 1718 when Levett prevented the Town Clerk from saying 'amen' to the final 'God Save the King' when a brief was read in church. Levett, according to testimony, had "clapt his Hand upon the Deponent's Mouth," and the Clerk "Blubbered" to the bemusement of the congregation. Three years passed before Levett again stirred up controversy. A candidate for coroner and Town Clerk, Levett was accused of wearing white roses on 10 June, as well as drinking toasts to the Pretender "with other Gentlemen who were reconned the Jacobites of the Town."

Subsequently, all Levett's accusers retracted their statements, and he was elected to office as Town Clerk. Levett's accusers claimed they had been manipulated into testifying against him by local Whigs. One accuser, a "poor servant girl" named Alice Hayes, even claimed that one prominent local Whig gentleman had promised to marry her if she swore falsely against the aspiring politico. Shortly afterwards, a petition was sent to the King, signed by 185 Lichfield worthies, including Michael Johnson, the father of Samuel, a favour that Levett later repaid when he arranged a tutor's job for Samuel Johnson at the home of Thomas Whitby in Great Haywood, near Lichfield, after Johnson's father's death.

Because of his position, Levett became a major powerbroker in Lichfield. In a letter to the Earl of Dartmouth and the Deputy Lieutenants from 1745, Levett gives a snapshot of the influence he wielded, and showed there was little doubt about where he stood on the question of the Monarchy. "By command of Lord Gower," Levett wrote, "I beg to call a meeting for 9 October to consider whether it will be more for his Majesty's service and the ease of the county, to call out the militia or to raise some companies of foot and a troop or two of horse, by virtue of commissions to be granted by Lord Gower, with a declaration that they shall be disbanded as soon as the present troubles are over."
