= Manley Hall =

Manley Hall may refer to

- Manley Hall, Erbistock, at Erbistock south of Wrexham
- Manley Hall, Manchester, a demolished house in Whalley Range
- Manley Hall, Staffordshire, a partly demolished country house near Lichfield
