= John Puleston =

John Puleston may refer to:

- John Puleston (judge) (c. 1583–1659), Welsh barrister and judge
- John Puleston (MP, died 1551) (by 1492–1551), Welsh politician, MP for Caernarvon Boroughs, and for Caernarvonshire
- Sir John Henry Puleston (1830–1908), Welsh journalist, entrepreneur and politician, MP for Devonport
