= John de Aston of Parkhall and Heywood =

Sir John de Aston (fl. 1475) of Parkhall and Heywood was a Sheriff of Staffordshire and of Warwickshire in the reign of Edward IV of England.

== Biography ==
Sir John was the son of Robert de Aston, of Parkhall and Heywood, (Note: Sir John was: The son of Sir Robert Aston of Parkhall and Heywood (Burke 1866, p. 13); The grandson of Sir Roger Aston of Great Heywood (Burke 1866, p. 13), who was one of the prime gentry returned by the commissioners for that county in 1433 (Burke 1866, p. 13), and served as Sheriff of Staffordshire in 1427 and 1433 during the (5th and 10th years of the reign of Henry VI (Erdeswicke & Harwood 1820, p. 63).) and his second wife Isabel, daughter of Sir William Brereton, of Brereton, Staffordshire.

Ashton was one of the adherents of William, Lord Hastings, who was put to death in a very summary manner, by the protector, afterwards King Richard III. The name of John Aston, Esq. is to be found in a list of 89 persons, knights, esquires, and gentlemen, who engaged to stand by Lord Hastings, whether in peace or war. (Note: This list is contained in an ancient roll, titled "Anno Edwardi Quarti decimo quarto", contains two lords; nine knights, 58 esquires, and 20 gentlemen, in all 89. The name of John Aston is the third among the esquires.)

Sir John was Sheriff of Staffordshire in 1475, (15th of the reign of Edward IV), and 1481 (20th of the reign of Edward IV). He was also twice Sheriff of Warwickshire.

== Family ==
Sir John married Elizabeth, daughter of Sir John Delves, of Doddington, Cheshire. They had sons and daughters:

- John, his successor and a favourite of Henry VIII
- Richard, later lived at Whorcross, Staffordshire.
- Robert.
- Elizabeth, married John Basset of Blore.
- —— married Dudley, of Sedgeley.
- Isabella, married Humphrey O'Keover.
- —— married Braddock, of Adelbaldeston.
- Catherine, married Thomas Blount of Burton.
- Margaret, married 1st, Thomas Kynardetley of Loxley; and 2nd Ralph Wolseley.
- Alice, married John Dodd, of Choriey.
- —— married Colwich, of Colwich, Staffordshire.
- Rose married Thomas Child, of Ormesley, Shropshire.
