= Edward Aston (died 1568) =

Sir Edward Aston (died 1568) built and resided at Tixall House, Staffordshire. He served four terms as Sheriff of Staffordshire.

== Biography ==
Edward Aston was the son and heir of Sir John Aston and Joan, the only child of Sir William Littleton, of Frankley, Worcestershire. Aston was knighted by Henry VIII at Calais in November 1532.

Sir Edward demolished the old manor house at Tixall and build a large mansion called Tixall House. Most of it has been demolished but the gatehouse survives. Sir Edward was Sheriff of Staffordshire in the years 1528, 1534, 1540, and 1556.

His tomb is in St Mary's Church, Stafford.

== Family ==
Sir Edward married first Mary, daughter of Sir Henry Vernon. They had no children, and she died in 1525.

Sir Edward married secondly Joan (died 15 September 1562), daughter of Sir Thomas Bowles (of Penhow Castle, Monmouthshire), a baron of the Exchequer.

They had several children:

- Walter Aston (1530–1589), was a Knight of the Shire and Sheriff of Staffordshire.
- Leonard.
- Anthony.
- Catherine, who married Sir William Gresley, of Drakelow, Derbyshire.
- Mary, who married Simon Harcourt, of Stanton Hardcourt, Oxfordshire and an ancestor of the Earl of Harcourt.
- Frances, who married Robert Needham, of Shenton, in Leicestershire, an ancestor of Viscount Kilmoney.
- Elizabeth, who married —— Lawley of Wenlock, Staffordshire.
