= A. M. Irvine =

Irish author (1866–1950)

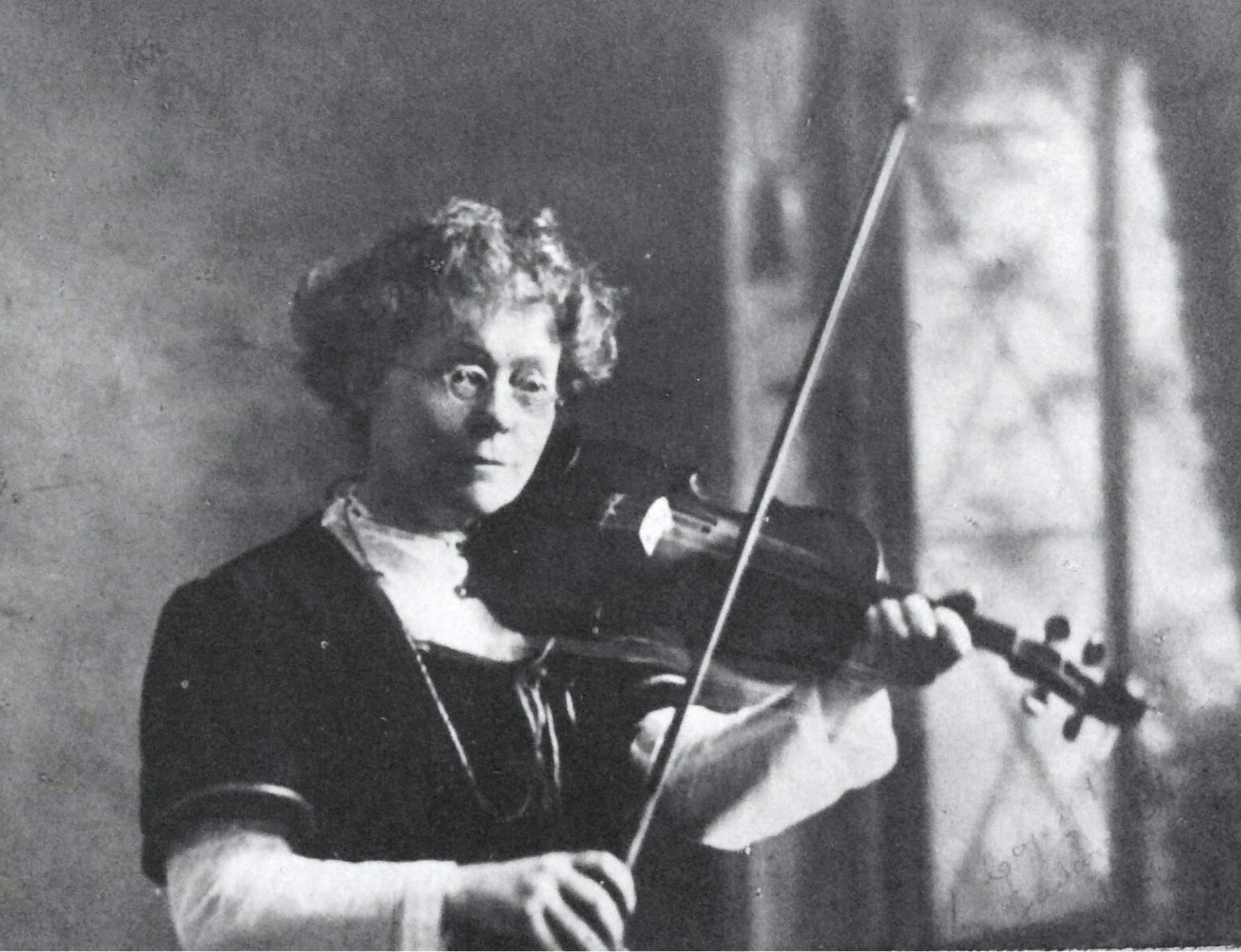
- A. M. Irvine in about 1920
- Born: Amelia Mary Irvine; 13 April 1866; Coleraine, County Londonderry, Ireland
- Died: 20 November 1950 (aged 84); Deal, Kent, England
- Known for: Author

Amelia Mary Irvine (13 April 1866–20 November 1950) was an Irish author who, as A. M. Irvine, wrote 28 books, several on a medical theme, but mostly stories for girls.

Her first published book was The Specialist in 1904 and not 1907.

== Early life ==
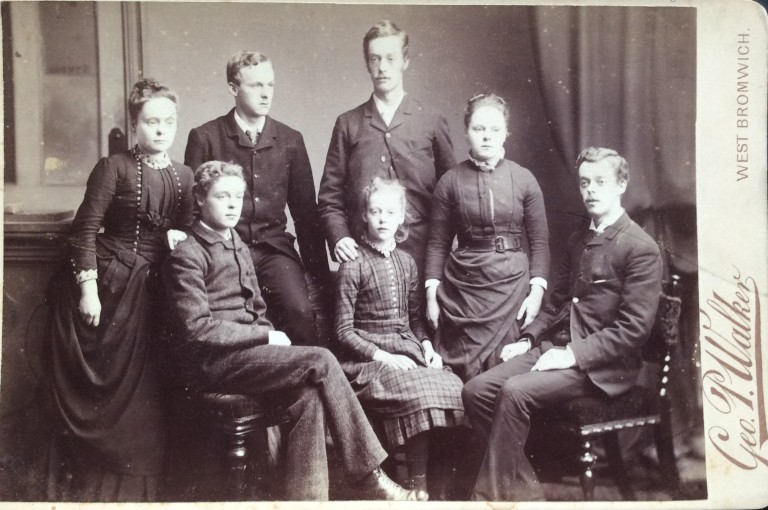
The Irvine siblings in 1885. Standing left to right: Amy Irvine, Maziere, John and Constance. Front row: William, Winifred and Arthur

Of Scottish and Irish descent, 'Amy' Irvine was born in Coleraine in County Londonderry, Ireland in 1866, one of seven children of Louisa Caroline née Brady (1840-1912) and the Reverend Arthur Benjamin Irvine (1838-1907), vicar of Holy Trinity Church in West Bromwich, near Birmingham from 1874 to 1902. Although his stipend was meagre, the Rev. Irvine ensured his children were adequately educated for their future lives. Amy Irvine was educated at Sandwell Hall, an Anglican boarding school. In 1891 and 1901 she was living at home with her parents, the last of her siblings to do so.

== Writing career ==
She developed an interest in medical life and in 1907 published her first novel, The Specialist, which features a minor staple of Edwardian fiction, the life-transforming operation. Another novel on a medical theme, aimed at girls, was The Frantic Misfortunes of a Nurse, Or, The Probationer (1910). In 1911 Irvine bought 78 West Street in Deal, in Kent and here she lived for nearly 50 years. In Deal she lived a simple self-sufficient life supported by her writing. She studied the violin and cello sufficiently well to be able to supplement her income by giving music lessons. In addition she painted landscapes, but this was for her own pleasure.

During World War I she served as a Voluntary Aid Detachment (VAD) nurse. The majority of her novels were aimed at schoolgirls, including The Worst Girl in the School and A Girl of the Fourth.

== Later years ==
Irvine had poor health for much of her life and survived a number of strokes. In the summer of 1942 during World War II her home was damaged by an enemy bomb and was looted by two local boys who stole her paints and paintings only to throw them away. Local residents clubbed together to fund the cost of replacing the stolen materials. She died at The Lumeah Nursing Home in Deal in Kent in November 1950. Her estate at her death was valued at £3792 7s. 8d. She never married.

== Books by A. M. Irvine ==
Books by Irvine include:

- The Beginning and End of Mary Jones [A tale.], Birmingham: The Midland Educational (1893) - as Amy Irvine
- Bothersome Babies. True-Alas!, Birmingham: Midland Educational Co (1893) - as Amy Irvine
- The Specialist, John Lane: The Bodley Head (1904)
- Roger Dinwiddie, Soul Doctor, London: T. Werner Laurie (1907)
- Cliff House: A Story For School Girls, London: S. W. Partridge & Co (1908)
- Auntie Amy's Bird Book: Fully illustrated, S. W. Partridge & Co (1909)
- A Girl Of The Fourth: The Story Of An Unpopular School-Girl, London: S. W. Partridge & Co (1909)
- The Probationer, London: S. W. Partridge & Co (1910)
- The Frantic Misfortunes of a Nurse, Or, The Probationer, S. W. Partridge and Company (1910)
- The Worst Girl in the School; or, The Secret Staff, London: S. W. Partridge & Co (1912)
- Nora, the Girl Guide; or, From Tenderfoot to Silver Fish, London: S. W. Partridge & Co (1913)
- The Dreams of Orlow, George Allen and Unwin, London (1916)
- Naida the Tenderfoot, London: S. W. Partridge & Co (1919)
- The Girl Who Was Expelled, London: S. W. Partridge & Co (1920)
- The Girl Who Ran Away, London: S. W. Partridge & Co (1922)
- The School Enemy: A Story for Girls, London: T. Nelson & Sons (1925)
- A School Conspiracy, London: Jarrolds (1926)
- The Two J. G's. A story for boys, London: T. Nelson & Sons (1930)
- Scouts to the Rescue, with Charles Platt, London: S. W. Partridge & Co (1932)
- Adventurous Jean, London: S. W. Partridge & Co (1934)
- Quiet Margaret London: S. W. Partridge & Co (1935)
