= Thomas Trentham =

16th-century English politician

Thomas Trentham (1538–1587) was an English politician.

He was the son of Richard Trentham of Rocester Abbey, who died in 1547.

In 1571, he became a Knight of the Shire in the House of Commons as one of two members for the County of Stafford. Later that year he was appointed High Sheriff of Staffordshire to replace the outgoing Sir Walter Aston and again in 1579. He was a staunch Protestant and greatly trusted by Queen Elizabeth and by 1577 was appointed the Custos Rotulorum of Staffordshire. He was one of the gentlemen out of Staffordshire appointed to attend Mary, Queen of Scots in her remove to Fotheringay Castle.

He died in 1587 and was buried on 25 May 1587 at Rocester Abbey, Staffordshire. He had married Jane Sneyd c. 1561 with whom he had several children. He was succeeded by his son and heir Francis Trentham, who became High Sheriff of Staffordshire in 1592. His second son Thomas became an MP for Newcastle-under-Lyme. His daughter, Elizabeth Trentham, married in 1591 Edward de Vere, 17th Earl of Oxford, Lord Great Chamberlain of England.
