= Weeford =

Village in Staffordshire, England

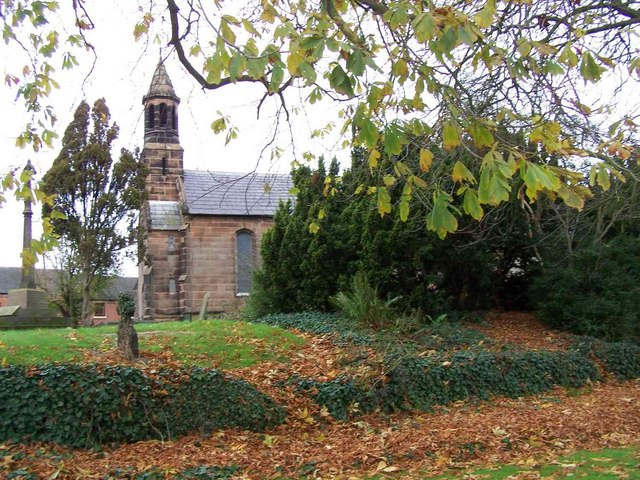
- St Mary's Church

- Location within Staffordshire
- Population: 215 (2011)
- OS grid reference: SK1404
- Civil parish: Weeford
- District: Lichfield
- Shire county: Staffordshire
- Region: West Midlands
- Country: England
- Sovereign state: United Kingdom
- Post town: LICHFIELD
- Postcode district: WS14
- Dialling code: 01543
- Police: Staffordshire
- Fire: Staffordshire
- Ambulance: West Midlands
- UK Parliament: Tamworth

Weeford is a village and civil parish in the Lichfield district of Staffordshire, England. According to the 2011 Census, the parish had a population of 215, an increase from 202 in the 2001 Census.

The name Weeford is believed to come from the Old English Wēohford or Wēoford, and to mean "Holy ford", or "ford by a heathen temple".

The medieval church is dedicated to St Mary the Virgin, and listed Grade II. It was rebuilt to its present form in 1802, to a design by James Wyatt. Wyatt had himself been born at Blackbrook Farm in Weeford in 1746, and by 1802 had already designed such buildings as the Radcliffe Observatory, Oxford and Broadway Tower, Worcestershire.

Manley Hall (also known as Thickbroom Hall) was an English Tudor-style country house which at one time stood in a 1200-acre estate on the western outskirts of the village.

Moneymore Hill was the site of Weeford Mill. The mill has been demolished as the hill has been quarried.

== Notable people ==
- Henry Wyatt (1794–1840), a portrait, subject and genre painter.

The British politician, author, journalist and broadcaster, Woodrow Wyatt was created a life peer on 3 February 1987 with the title Baron Wyatt of Weeford, in the County of Staffordshire. The Wyatt family had lived at Weeford in the seventeenth century.

== Listed buildings ==
The parish contains eight listed buildings that are recorded in the National Heritage List for England. All the listed buildings are designated at Grade II, the lowest of the three grades, which is applied to "buildings of national importance and special interest". The parish includes the village of Weeford and the surrounding countryside. The buildings in Weeford House Farm were at one time part of a large coach staging complex, and some of them are listed. The other listed buildings are a church, a farmhouse, and two lodges.

Name and location	Photograph	Date	Notes
Blackbrook Farmhouse; 52.63002°N 1.80215°W	—	18th century	A red brick farmhouse with a corbelled and dentilled eaves band, and a tile roof with verge parapets. It is in early Georgian style, and there are two storeys and an attic, a double depth plan, and a front of five bays. On the front is a doorway with a radial fanlight and a pediment, the windows are sashes with painted wedged segmental heads, the middle window in the upper floor with a raised keystone, and there are three gabled dormers.
St Mary's Church; 52.63255°N 1.79239°W		1802	The west bay, chancel and bell turret were added later in the 19th century. The church is built in sandstone with slate roofs, and consists of a nave, north and south transepts, a chancel, and a north vestry, with the bell turret at the west end. The bell turret has a square base, rising to an octagonal bell stage with a pyramidal cap, and the bell openings have Tudor arched heads.
Cartshed 120 metres northeast of Weeford House Farmhouse; 52.63297°N 1.79319°W	—	Early 19th century	The cartshed is in red brick with an eaves band and a tile roof. There is one storey and an attic, and the east front contains four segmental-headed cart entries.
Cartshed 150 metres northeast of Weeford House Farmhouse; 52.63314°N 1.79295°W	—	Early 19th century	The cartshed is in red brick with an eaves band, and a tile roof with a verge parapet on the left. There is a single storey, and the west front contains three segmental-headed cart entries.
Stable block east of Weeford House Farmhouse; 52.63279°N 1.79251°W	—	Early 19th century	The stable block is in red brick with an eaves band and a tile roof. There are two storeys, and a south front of 13 bays. In the centre is a square pavilion with a pyramidal roof surmounted by a timber dovecote. The front contains various openings, including a segmental-headed cart entry, with a round-arched opening above.
Stable and walls northeast of Weeford House Farmhouse; 52.63294°N 1.79281°W	—	Early 19th century	The stable is in red brick with string courses, and a tile roof with verge parapets and kneelers. There are two storeys, and a Classical front of three bays. In the centre is a segmental-arched opening, flanked by round-headed and rectangular blind openings. At the sides of the stable are walls of one-storey height and one bay wide.
Manley Lodge; 52.62781°N 1.81667°W	—	c. 1830–40	The lodge is in brick with stone dressings on a chamfered plinth, with a floor band, and a slate roof with coped gables and kneelers. There are two storeys and an L-shaped plan. The porch is gabled and has a four-centred arch and mullioned windows on the sides. The windows are iron-framed casements with chamfered surrounds. On the gables are finials with ogee domical caps.
Weeford Lodge; 52.63351°N 1.80256°W	—	1830s	The lodge is in red brick with stone dressings, a string course, and a slate roof with coped verge parapets on corbelled kneelers with finials. It is in Tudor style, there are two storeys, the front facing the road has two bays, a small central gable, and it contains mullioned windows. On the front facing the drive is a gabled porch and a Tudor arched doorway.
