= Sandwell Hall =

Former mansion house near West Bromwich, UK

- Location in West Midlands

General information
- Location: Site of Sandwell Priory, in Sandwell Valley, West Midlands grid reference SP 025 914
- Coordinates: 52°31′14″N 1°57′53″W
- Completed: 1711
- Demolished: 1928
- Owner: William Legge, 1st Earl of Dartmouth

Design and construction
- Architect: William Smith of Tettenhall

Sandwell Hall was a mansion house in the county of West Midlands (originally in Staffordshire), England, about 1 mile (1.6 km) east of West Bromwich. The site is within Sandwell Valley Country Park. It was built in 1711 for William Legge, 1st Earl of Dartmouth, and demolished in 1928.

== History ==
=== Whorwood family ===
The estate of Sandwell, formerly the property of Sandwell Priory, was owned from 1531, shortly after the Dissolution of the Monasteries, by Dame Lucy Clifford; in 1569 they were purchased from her grandson by Robert Whorwood.

Priory House, created out of the original priory, was known as Sandwell Hall by 1611 when it was occupied by William Whorwood. His son, Thomas Whorwood, was knighted by King James in 1624. He was censured in the Star Chamber in 1634 for having his bailiff kill a man at King's Norton. Thomas Whorwood had married Ursula Brome, their son Brome Whorwood (1615-1684) married Jane Ryder in 1634. She became a spy for Charles I.

=== Earls of Dartmouth ===
In 1701 William, Baron Dartmouth (1st Earl of Dartmouth from 1711) purchased the estate of Sandwell from Thomas Brome Whorwood, a descendant of Robert Whorwood. The Earl of Dartmouth had the house rebuilt, by William Smith of Tettenhall, a leading master-builder of the area. Construction began in 1705, and the brick-built hall, designed by Smith, was completed about 1711. Fragments of the priory house remained as parts of the new building.

The house was the favourite residence of William Legge, 2nd Earl of Dartmouth, grandson of the 1st Earl whom he succeeded in 1750. In the mid 18th century a park was created, and ponds, thought to have been part of the priory, were modified. In the early 19th century a portico was added to the house, and the house was extended on the west side. From 1853 William Legge, 5th Earl of Dartmouth lived at Patshull Hall in Staffordshire; it is supposed that his move away was due to the industrial development of West Bromwich. Sandwell Hall was let for a short period to the industrialist George Muntz, then was unoccupied.

=== Later history ===
In 1857 it became the Sandwell Hall Training Home, established "to receive children, more especially the orphans of the respectable poor, and train them for domestic service". The Earl and Countess of Dartmouth were Presidents of the charity.

In the 1860s Frances Laetitia Selwyn was running an Anglican boarding school here and A. M. Irvine and Florence Gadesden were notable pupils. By the time it closed in 1891 it had extended its range to governesses and even industrial jobs irrespective of gender.

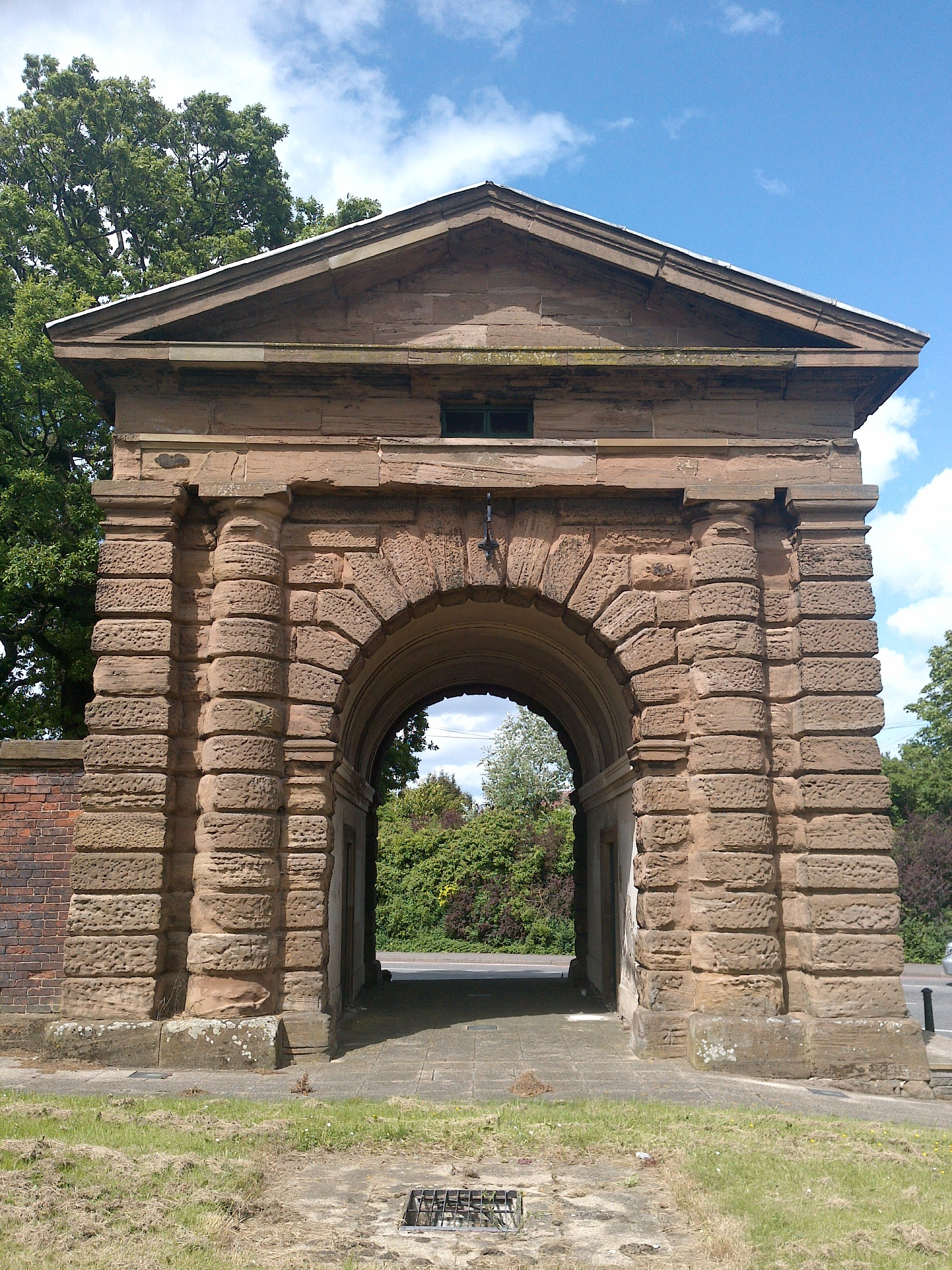
The lodge of Sandwell Hall

In 1898 it became a branch of Winson Green Asylum, housing 150 inmates. In 1907 the Reverend Harold Burden and his wife Katherine opened the hall as an Industrial School for Mentally Defective Children, specified in 1908 to accommodate 200 boys. In 1913 the Burdens set up a trust to take over ownership of this and their other institutions. The school closed in 1921. The building, damaged by mining subsidence, was demolished in 1928.

The lodge of Sandwell Hall survives, within the roundabout of Junction 1 of the M5 Motorway, at grid reference SP 0185 9041; it is a Grade II listed building. It is a pedimented gateway with Doric columns, thought to be built by William Smith; a curved flanking wall on its left also survives.
