= G. H. Downing =

British businessman (1866–1937)

George Downing JP
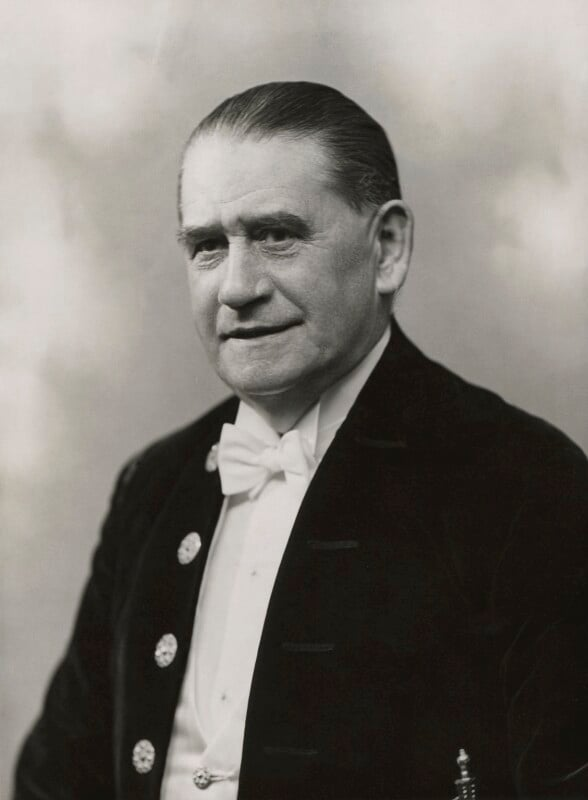
- G.H. Downing

High Sheriff of Staffordshire
- In office 1936–1937

Personal details
- Born: George Henry Downing; 10 November 1866 Chesterton, Staffordshire, England
- Died: 12 October 1937 (aged 70) Newcastle-under-Lyme, Staffordshire, England
- Relatives: Ken Downing (son)
- Occupation: Manufacturer, philanthropist

George Henry Downing, JP (10 November 1866 – 12 October 1937) was a British businessman and philanthropist. He was chairman of G.H. Downing & Co. Ltd., involved in the manufacture of bricks and tiles.

Established by his father James Downing (1845-1901) in the late 19th century, the company claimed to be the largest producer of roof tiles in the world. Based at Brampton Hill, Newcastle-under-Lyme, G.H. Downing became one of the principal employers in north Staffordshire with several thousand workpeople. In 1921, he acquired the Etruria works. By 1939 the company had taken over the entirety of the local Staffordshire works.

Downing was a Justice of the peace for Stoke-on-Trent and appointed High Sheriff of Staffordshire in 1936.

On 10 November 1936, Downing celebrated his birthday at Trentham with over 3500 guests.

Downing died at his residence of Clayton Lodge, Newcastle-under-Lyme, in October 1937, aged 70. He was to be knighted, but died before the patent could be completed.

He was the father of Ken Downing, a Formula One racing driver.

Honorary titles
Preceded by Adolph Wenger	High Sheriff of Staffordshire; 1936–1937	Succeeded by Reginald Monckton
