= Perpetuana =

Woollen fabric of the Early Modern period

Perpetuana was a woollen fabric made and used in early modern England and elsewhere for clothing and furnishings including bed hangings. It was lighter than broadcloth and resembled serge, some varieties had a glossy finish. The name seems to advertise its long-lasting qualities. A fabric called "sempiternum" or "sempiterna" for the same reason was perhaps a similar weave. Like another English-made fabric "Penniston", perpetuana was used for the clothing of slaves in Jamaica and the Caribbean.

== New drapery ==
The cloth was one of the "new draperies" first made in England at Norwich, Colchester, and Taunton in the last half of the 16th century.

Perpetuana was permitted as an export to India by Charles I in 1631. Large quantities of English perpetuana were shipped to Hamburg in 1640. Also known as "perpets", perpetuana fabrics were made in France and Holland (Leiden). An English author in 1713 considered that the English version of the cloth had better success as an export to Spain than the French, as it was cheaper and possibly of better quality. By this time, Crediton and Sandford in Devon had become centres for weaving perpetuana and other woollens.

== As country clothing ==
An Edinburgh tailor Patrick Nimmo supplied a doublet and socks or hose of "sad perpetuana" to the Marquess of Hamilton in 1605. The account book of William Fitzwilliam of Milton Hall includes the making of two pairs of perpetuana hose trimmed with gold and silver lace around the year 1610. A green perpetuana doublet was made for Richard Bagot, a son of Walter Bagot of Blithfield, in 1611. Accounts for the clothes of Thomas Myddleton at Chirk Castle in 1612 include "sea-green" perpetuana.

Two park keepers in Thomas Campion's entertainment at Caversham Park on 27 April 1613 for Anne of Denmark were "formally attired in green perpetuana". Perpetuana was suitable for country workmen and servants. Lord William Howard of Naworth Castle bought broadcloth in November 1617 and six yards of lighter green perpetuana in June 1618 for the clothes of his servant George Armstrong. In 1640, Sir William Calley of Chiseldon and Burderop Park, a retired cloth merchant, asked his steward Richard Harvey to buy "broad black perpetuana" to make suits for three servants.

=== Female elite costume ===
In February 1616, Annas Elphinstone, Countess of Sutherland, widow of John Gordon, 13th Earl of Sutherland, wrote from Dunrobin Castle to a tailor in Edinburgh, asking him to send fine and light-coloured perpetuana to make a gown for her daughter Elizabeth Gordon, soon to be Lady Frendraught.

== On the stage ==
There are references to perpetuana in 17th-century drama. In Ben Jonson's Cynthia's Revels of 1600, a character Hedon suggests that courtiers should wear silks rather than perpetuana, and the gentleman ushers of the court ought to exclude such tough "terrible coarse rags" and "rubbing devices" from the royal presence. Perpetuana was the name of a character in John Marston's 1599 play Histriomastix, (at first) the wife of a merchant "Velure", a French word for velvet. A textile-based insult in Barnabe Barnes' The Devil's Charter of 1607 has the alliterative "My perpetuana pander". Black perpetuana was used to make a costume for a madman in Thomas Campion's Masque of Lords and Honourable Maids, performed at the wedding of Princess Elizabeth and Frederick V of the Palatinate.

== Bed hangings ==
Despite negative associations presented on the stage, perpetuana was chosen for warm winter clothes and bed curtains by aristocrats. In 1606, William Cavendish, a son of Bess of Hardwick, bought a suit of green perpetuana for his teenage son, also William Cavendish. There were four perpetuana beds decorated with lace with matching chairs and stools at Petworth House in 1635. In 1639 at Gosfield Hall in Essex there was a French (style) bed of green perpetuana, and a red perpetuana bed in a nursery. Henrietta Maria owned some crimson damask window curtains lined with red perpetuana. Blue perpetuana hangings and a blue perpetuana bed at Ham House were trimmed with gilt Spanish leather.

== In church ==
Green perpetuana was used to back or "bottom" a cushion with green silk fringes for the pulpit of St Laurence's at Ludlow in 1621, and to make a decorative border for the pulpit. Blue perpetuana was chosen for a new chapel screen at King's College, Cambridge in 1633.

== Perpetuana and slavery ==
Richard Cocks an officer of the English East India Company stationed at Hirado in Japan received a bale of English perpetuana from the cargo of the Adviz in 1617. Hard-wearing perpetuana was exported to America. The cloth was exchanged for slaves at Ouidah in Benin and at Accra in Ghana. Olfert Dapper, a 17th-century writer, mentioned that men of the Guinea Coast wore outfits made from a variety of fabrics or stuffs including perpetuana in his Description of Africa (1668). West Africans rejected plain blue and black perpetuanas offered for sale in 1660, preferring brighter colours. In the 18th-century clothing for slaves in Jamaica was made with perpetuana fabric. Female slaves on several estates had petticoats of perpetuana.
