= John Morris (soldier) =

John Morris (1617?–1649) was a celebrated and dashing army officer of the First English Civil War. He served on both royalist and parliamentarian sides of the conflict, and was executed on a treason charge.

== Early life ==
John Morris was eldest son of Mathias Morris of Emsall, near Pontefract, Yorkshire. Mathias Morris was the son of Thomas Morris and Barbara Wentworth, daughter of John Wentworth of Emsall Esq. This made John Morris the great-grandson of John Wentworth Esq. John Morris' great uncle, Richard Morris, was a steward to Thomas Wentworth, Earl of Strafford. The Wentworth family had strong links to North Elmsall for many generations. Brought up in the house of Thomas Wentworth, Earl of Strafford, when Strafford became Lord Deputy of Ireland, he was at age 16 made ensign to Strafford's own company of foot, and soon afterwards lieutenant of his guard. After Strafford's death, Morris became captain in Sir Henry Tichborne's regiment. During the Irish rebellion of 1641 he was appointed sergeant-major in the regiment commanded by Sir Francis Willoughby, and major by commission from the Earl of Ormonde (2 June 1642). After the storming of Ross Castle, though wounded, he rallied some English troops that were retreating before General Preston, and charged the enemy. On returning to England, Morris served for a while in Lord Byron's regiment.

== Roundhead soldier ==
After the surrender of Liverpool in 1644, Morris threw up his commission on a whim, and joined the parliamentary army, where he became a colonel. But when the New Model Army was set up, he was out of place, and was not immediately entrusted with command. Morris went back to his home at Esthagh. Esthagh is one of many variants used to name East Hague, the location of Hague Hall, then the manor house of the Parish of South Kirkby, near Pontefract. The manor house, Hague Hall was acquired by Nathaniel Burkead Esq around 1620 the area must have been the location of more buildings as John Morris and his family were not the sole inhabitants. Edward Watson inherited the manor in 1649 from his father-in-law Nathaniel Birkhead, showing that Morris was simply an inhabitant in the area.

== Seizure of Pontefract Castle ==
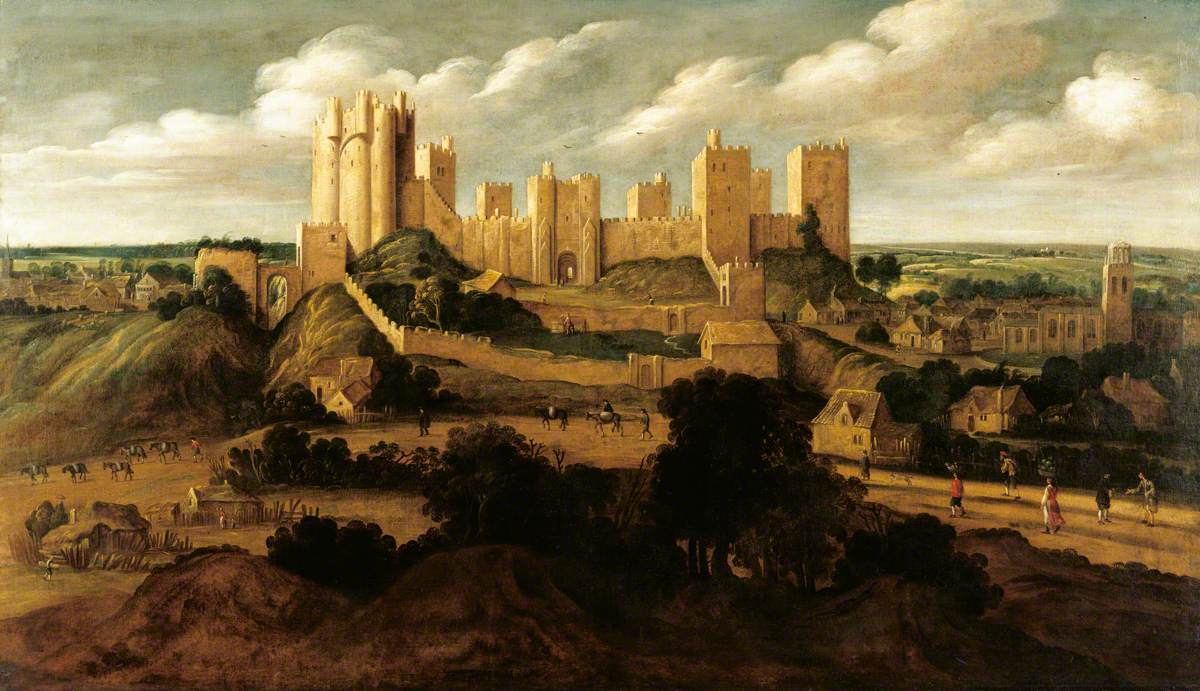
Pontefract Castle, painted about 1620 by Alexander Keirincx

From the siege of Sandal Castle in 1645 Morris knew Colonel Robert Overton, who had since been made governor of Pontefract. With reason to believe Overton sympathetic to the royalists, Morris entered into a conspiracy with him to surprise Pontefract Castle: Overton promised that he would open a sally port at need. But in November 1647 Overton was transferred to the governorship of Kingston upon Hull, and Morris had little connection with Cotterell, who succeeded him at Pontefract.

Morris made an unsuccessful attempt to seize the castle by means of a scaling ladder on 18 May 1648. Cotterell pulled in those of the garrison who were sleeping in the town, and issued warrants for beds for a hundred men. Disguised as countrymen, Morris and William Paulden (brother of Capt. Thomas Paulden), each with four men carrying beds and with three others bringing money as though to compound for theirs, gained admission to the castle on 3 June. Offering quarter to the guard, they shut them in the dungeon. Cotterell, who, lying on his bed at the time, resisted Paulden and was wounded. Troops waiting nearby joined Morris's party. Colonel Bonivent who had been governor of Sandal Castle in 1644-5 was at first credited with the exploit; and Morris allowed Sir John Digby, who came from Nottingham, to assume nominal command.

Morris answered Oliver Cromwell's summons to surrender (9 November) with defiance, but desertions were frequent. He made two determined sallies in February 1649 but was compelled on 3 March to treat with the parliamentarians. General John Lambert, who was in command, insisted upon having six persons, whom he refused to name, excepted from mercy, and of these Morris was one.

== Aftermath and trial ==
On 17 March the treaty was concluded. The excepted officers having liberty to make their escape if they could, Morris charged through the enemy's army, and with Cornet Michael Blackborne got away into Lancashire. Lambert had given assurance for Morris's safety if he could escape five miles from the castle; but he was betrayed at Oreton in the Furness Fells, about ten days later, and taken to Lancaster Castle.

On 16 August Morris was brought to trial at York assizes, and indicted. The judges, John Puleston and Francis Thorpe, ordered him to be put in irons. He defended himself, and was condemned to death as a traitor; vain efforts were made to save him, even by officers of the parliamentary army. On the night of 20 August Morris and his fellow-prisoner Blackborne escaped from prison in York Castle, but in getting over the wall Blackborne broke his leg, and Morris refused to leave him. They were retaken, and executed on 23 August.

== Burial and legacy ==
By his desire Morris was buried at Wentworth, near the grave of Lord Strafford. His exploits were celebrated by Thomas Vaughan in Latin elegiac poems printed at the end of Henry Vaughan's Thalia Rediviva (1678).

== Family ==
Morris married Margery (1627-1665), eldest daughter of Robert Dawson, Bishop of Clonfert and Kilmacduagh, by whom he had issue Robert (b. 1645) of North Emsall, Castilian (1648-1702), and Mary. His widow remarried Jonas Bulkeley or Buckley of South Elmsall, fourth son of Abel Bulkley, of Bulkley, Lancashire. Castilian, so named because he was born during the siege of Pontefract Castle, was appointed town clerk of Leeds in 1684. Some extracts from his diary were printed in the Yorkshire Archaeological and Topographical Journal (x. 159). Margery appears to have died in childbirth, giving birth to Morris Buckley the son of Jonas Buckley.

== Notes ==
Attribution

This article incorporates text from a publication now in the public domain: Lee, Sidney, ed. (1894). "Morris, John (1617?-1649)". Dictionary of National Biography. Vol. 39. London: Smith, Elder & Co.
