= Brome Whorwood =

Brome Whorwood (10 October 1615 – 12 April 1684) was an English politician, and Lord of the Manor of Headington and Holton. He supported exclusion during the Exclusion Crisis.

== Life ==
He was the elder son of Sir Thomas Whorwood of Sandwell Hall in Staffordshire, and his wife Ursula, daughter and heir of George Brome of Holton, Oxfordshire. During 1634 he attended Trinity College, Oxford.

His biographers in The History of Parliament wrote that from his father "he inherited a savage and penurious disposition". Anthony Wood regarded him as a clownish and ill-natured person.

In 1634, he married Jane Ryder in London. She was a Royalist agent during the Civil War; Brome Whorwood lived on the continent during this period. They had two children who lived beyond infancy: Brome (1635–1657), drowned on a crossing to the Isle of Wight; Diana (1639–1701), married in 1677 Dr Edward Masters, Chancellor of the Diocese of Exeter.

On the death of his mother in 1653, he became Lord of the Manors of Headington and Holton, where he was usually resident. In June 1659, Jane obtained a decree of alimony against her husband. He had a relationship with his servant Katherine Mary Allen, and they had a son Thomas Allen alias Whorwood, born in 1664.

Among offices held, Whorwood was High Sheriff of Staffordshire from 1653 to 1654, and he was an assistant of the Company of Royal Adventurers Trading into Africa from 1669 to 1671.

He was elected MP for Oxford in four successive parliaments, in the elections of 1661, March 1679, October 1679 to the Exclusion Bill Parliament, in which he supported the Exclusion Bill, and 1681. Having supported exclusion, he remained under suspicion; his house was searched for arms after the Rye House Plot.

Whorwood died in 1684 and was buried at Holton; the Manor of Headington and Holton passed to his daughter Diana, and on her death in 1701 to Diana's half-brother Thomas.
