= Robert Puleston =

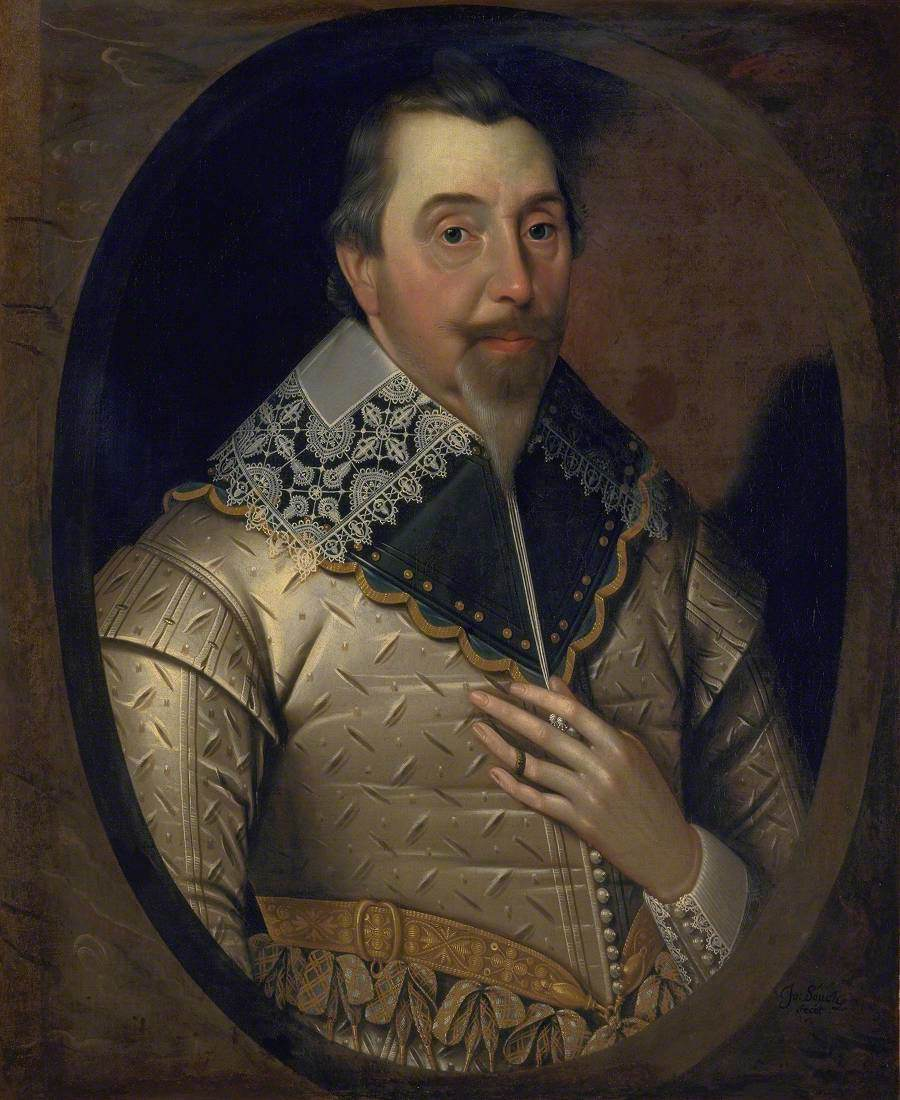
Painting of a member of the Puleston family, possibly George Puleston, by an English artist

Robert Puleston was a brother-in-law and supporter of Owain Glyndŵr, at the time of his rebellion against King Henry IV of England in the early 15th century and afterwards.

== Lineage ==
He was from a well established Welsh Marcher family. Pulestons had settled during the reign of King Henry III in Newport, Shropshire initially, in Pilston village and manor, from where they derive their surname.

His forebear Sir Roger de Puleston (died 1294) established himself at Emral in Maelor Saesneg, and was appointed the first High Sheriff of Anglesey by King Edward I of England in 1293. His first task there was to impose the new English taxes (one fifteenth of all moveables) that unsurprisingly led to the revolt of Madog ap Llywelyn, at the height of which the Welsh mob seized the Sheriff and hanged him following a raid on Caernarvon borough.

Another Puleston, Richard de Puleston, was at this time King Edward's High Sheriff of Caernarvonshire and had been appointed the same date as Sir Roger - the two men were brothers.

== Career ==
Robert Puleston was son of Richard Puleston. He was a witness in the Scrope v. Grosvenor Trial at Chester in 1386, alongside another witness Owain Glyndŵr.

This trial was to settle a dispute between Sir Richard le Scrope of Bolton and Sir Robert Grosvenor of Hulme concerning ownership of a coat of arms. During King Richard II's military campaign in Scotland in 1385 three knights had borne the same coat of arms. Also involved was Carminow of Cornwall.

The Court was presided over by the Duke of Gloucester as Constable of England who also adjudicated on the evidence presented by each party and their many witnesses. The trial was to run for five years.

Glyndŵr gave evidence on behalf of Grosvenor saying he had seen Grosvenor bear the arms and that in the counties of Flintshire, Chester and Denbighshire they were accepted as being his rightfully. Glyndŵr's younger brother Tudur also testified to this, as did Puleston. However, eventually Scrope won.

Puleston later took part in Glyndŵr's rebellion and his extensive lands in the county of Chester, in Shropshire, and Flintshire were declared forfeit before 1401. However, as part of the programme of Royal Pardons meted out by the new King Henry V he received his old lands back, restored to him after the rebellion had petered out around 1415.

== Marriage and issue ==
Robert Puleston married Owain Glyndŵr's younger sister, Lowry. They had a son called John Puleston, whose will was proved in 1444. He married Angharad, a daughter of Griffith Hanmer, of the same family as Owain Glyndŵr's wife, Margaret Hanmer.

Angharad was a granddaughter of Gronw ap Tudor of Anglesey, member of the Tudors of Penmynydd. Another son, Roger Puleston (died 1469), who was a staunch ally of Jasper Tudor, Earl of Pembroke holding Denbigh Castle as Deputy Constable to Jasper Tudor in 1460 and 1461.
