= Walter Bagot (died 1622) =

Member of the Parliament of England

Sir Walter Bagot of Blithfield (1557–1623), was a landowner and Member of Parliament for Tamworth in 1586. He was High Sheriff of Staffordshire in 1602.

== Background ==
Walter Bagot was the son of Richard Bagot (1530-1597) of Blithfield and Mary Saunders. He was educated at Merton College, Oxford.

Bagot married Elizabeth Cave (d. 1638), daughter of Roger Cave of Stanford and Elizabeth Cecil, a daughter of Thomas Cecil (1542-1623).

== The Chadwick Bagot letters ==
Bagot's eldest son Lewis's behaviour in London caused his parents concern. He had discussed marrying his cousin Jane Skipwith behind his father's back. Before and after his death in 1611 there was a rumour that he had a child or was married. Bagot asked his associates in London, John Chadwick and Thomas Docksie, to investigate. They found a woman called Mary Bagaley who claimed to be Lewis's wife, but the marriage had been kept secret by Lewis for "fear of his father's displeasure". Mary said she was pregnant by Lewis. Chadwick and Docksie heard that Lewis had denied any relationship with Mary, and they thought she was faking the pregnancy with padding. Chadwick discovered another woman, Jane Wilcox, a connection of Lewis's aunt Dorothy Okeover, who claimed to have had a child by Lewis. He found midwives willing to testify that she had not had a child. Wilcox was calling herself a widow and living near Theobalds at a house provided by her new lover.

== Death and legacy ==
Bagot died on 16 March 1623.

Many of the Bagot family papers from Blithfield Hall were acquired by the Folger Shakespeare Library at Sotheby's in 1955, from Winnie Myers in 1959, and from Bernard Quaritch in 1962. These include letters to Walter Bagot from his sister Lettice Kinnersley.

== Family ==
Walter and Elizabeth Bagot had five sons and six daughters, including:

- Lewis Bagot (1587-1611)
- Hervey Bagot (b. 1590)
- Richard Bagot (b. 1592), a bill for his suit of clothing in 1611 includes a green perpetuana doublet.
- Thomas
- William (b. 1605), married Mary Hughes
- Anne, married John Lane of Bentley. Her daughter Jane Lane travelled with the disguised and defeated Charles I of England from Staffordshire to Trent, Dorset
- Frances, married Thomas Broughton of Broughton
- Letitia, married Thomas Owen of Condover
- Mary
- Elizabeth
