= Zachary Babington =

English barrister

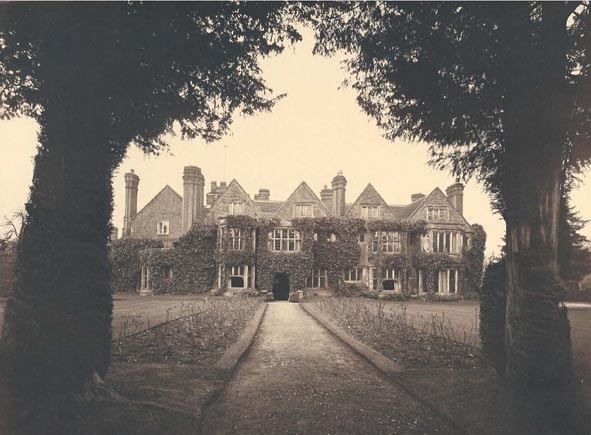
Whittington Old Hall, Whittington, Staffordshire, home of Zachary Babington

Zachary Babington (born c. 1690 – 15 October 1745) was an English barrister who served as High Sheriff of Staffordshire in 1713 and 1724.

He was the son of John Babington (High Sheriff in 1702), and was named for his grandfather Dr. Zachary Babington, chancellor of Lichfield Cathedral. He was distantly related to Anthony Babington, who in 1586 was hung, drawn and quartered on Tower Hill for his participation in the Babington Plot to put Mary, Queen of Scots, on the English throne. But a nearer relation had been chaplain to King Charles I.

Babington attended University College, Oxford, matriculating at age 17 in 1707, and was a student at the Inner Temple in 1708.

Babington resided at Curborough Hall, Curborough, Staffordshire, and later at Whittington Old Hall, Whittington, Staffordshire. Zachary Babington's daughter Mary married Theophilus Levett, town clerk of Lichfield, Staffordshire. The Levett family inherited the Babington estates at Curborough and Packington.
