= Thomas Trentham (1575–1605) =

English politician

Thomas Trentham (1575–1605) was an English politician.

He was the second son of Thomas Trentham and educated at Balliol College, Oxford (1591).

He was a member (MP) of the parliament of England for Newcastle-under-Lyme in 1601.
