= Hamlet Puleston =

Hamlet Puleston or Puliston (1632–1662) was an English academic, known as a political writer.

== Life ==
Born at Old Alresford, Hampshire, he was the son of Richard Puleston, a cleric, and nephew of John Puleston. Admitted a scholar of Wadham College, Oxford on 20 August 1647, he graduated B.A. on 23 May 1650, and M.A. on 25 April 1653.

Puleston at first declined to subscribe to the ordinances of the parliamentary visitors; he took part, in fact, in the stubborn armed resistance in Lincoln College, around George Hitchcocke. Subsequently he became a fellow of Jesus College. He was nominated moderator dialecticæ on 19 May 1656. Anthony Wood wrote that he also became a local preacher.

Puleston later settled in London, where he died at the beginning of 1662, in poverty according to Wood.

== Works ==
Puleston published in 1660 Monarchiæ Britannicæ singularis Protectio; or a brief historical Essay tending to prove God's especial providence over the British Monarchy. It was reissued as the Epitome Monarchiæ Britannicæ … wherein many remarkable observations on the civil wars of England, and General Monk's Politique Transactions in reducing the Nation to a firm Union, for the resettlement of his Majesty, are clearly discovered, 1663.

== Notes ==
Attribution

This article incorporates text from a publication now in the public domain: Lee, Sidney, ed. (1896). "Puleston, Hamlet". Dictionary of National Biography. Vol. 47. London: Smith, Elder & Co.
