= Puleston Cross =

Butter cross

Coordinates: 52.76932°N 2.37903°W

The Puleston Cross is a Butter cross in the market town of Newport, in the Telford and Wrekin district, in the ceremonial county of Shropshire, England.

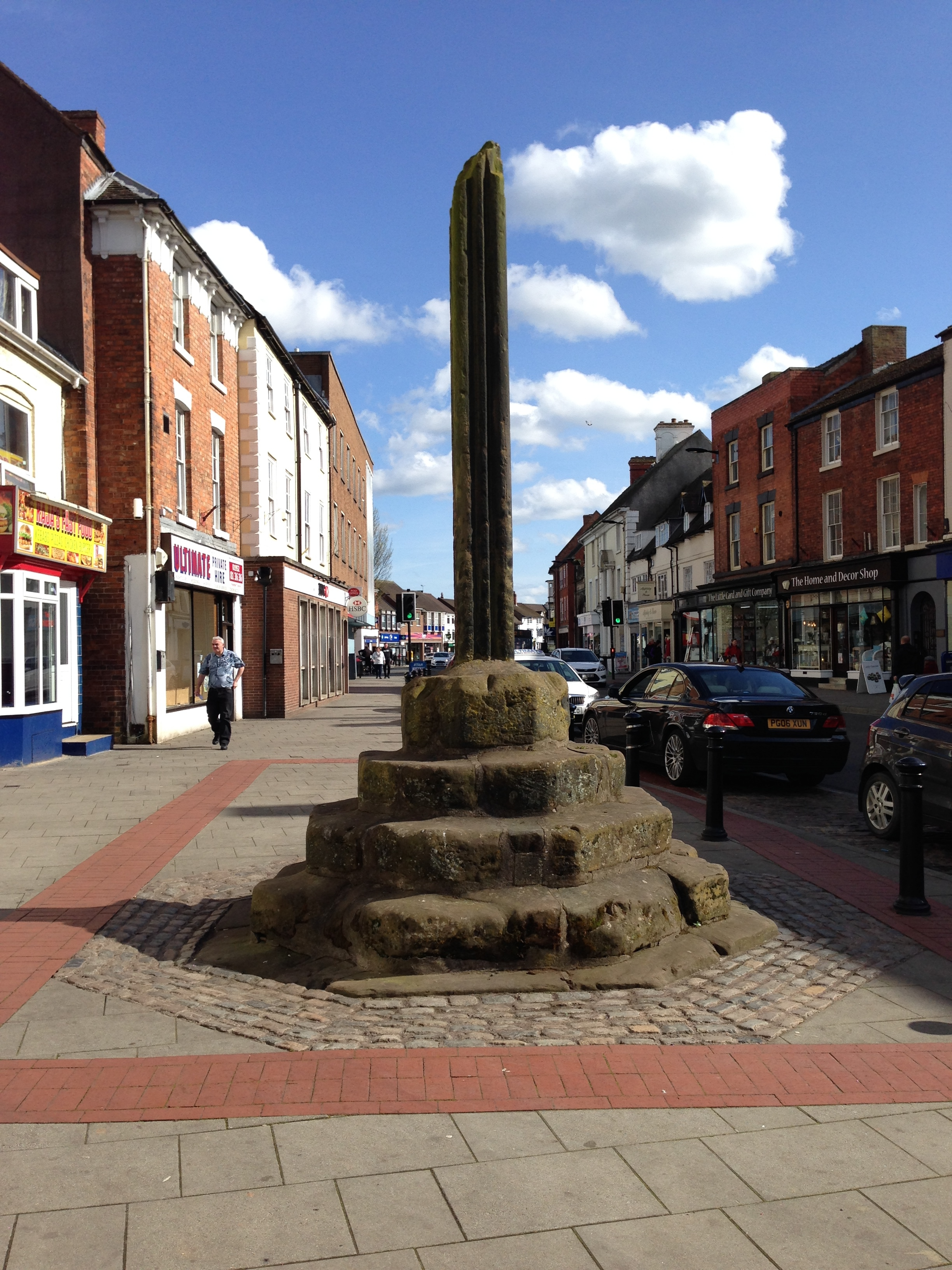
The Puleston Cross, Newport, Shropshire. Erected c.1280 in memory of Sir Roger de Pyvelesdon, who died in 1272.

The Cross sits in Middle Row, formerly Rotten Row, and denotes the market place. The cross was built in the early 14th century and was moved to this position in 1633 after the new market hall was built by William Adams.

The Butter Cross

The Market or "Butter" Cross of which this is the shaft and base, was originally set up c.1280 in memory of Roger de Pyvelesdon, and hence is also known as "The Puleston Cross". It was probably mutilated during the Civil War.

The cross is protected as a monument of National Importance under the Ancient Monuments Act 1913–1953.

— Ancient Monuments act (1956)

The cross was set up in memory of Sir Roger de Pyvelesdon who died in 1272, in Shropshire. This is confirmed in a deed dated 1285, signed by his son and namesake Sir Roger de Puleston, which includes these words: the cross set up for the soul of Roger de Pyvelesdon who died in 1272.

The father has sometimes been confused with the son, who was killed in a Welsh revolt in 1295, leading more than one local historian to state the cross was erected in memory of this Roger.

The cross has remained in its current position since the 13th century.

There are differing accounts as to how the cross lost its head. It has been alleged to have been "decapitated by the Parliamentarians" troops in the English Civil War. Another account is that: "When the Market was rebuilt after the fire of 1665 the top of the Cross was broken off and remained in a local garden for many years and was then broken up to mend a footpath".

== The Butter Cross market ==
The Butter Cross (market) was built around the cross by Richard Barnefield in 1632. Some records indicate that it was rebuilt by Thomas Talbot in 1665. The market was demolished in 1866. It was taken down as there was no further use for it when the new market hall was built.

The Market cross was spared demolition and given railings to protect the cross from damage; these have since been taken down.

The market cross consists of five steep octagonal steps leading to the remains of a square-sectioned fluted shaft made from Sandstone and is overall 500cm high.

== 2010 redevelopment ==
In the summer of 2010 the cobbles that surrounded the monument were removed and replaced with paving, stopping cars parking around the cross, with archaeologists from English Hermitage carrying out work on the surroundings of the monument, uncovering that the monument had stood in the same position since around 1280 and finding the foundations of the 1850s market hall.

This meant the designs for the Buttercross pavements were amended so that the footprint of the foundations can be traced and by digging a small, deeper hole around the monument, the team also unearthed original cobbles which appear to date back hundreds of years and small pieces of china and animal teeth were also found which were taken away for examination.

== See also ==
- Listed buildings in Newport, Shropshire
