= John Aston (MP for Leominster, 1388) =

English politician

John Aston (fl. 1388) was an English politician. He sat as MP for Leominster in September 1388.

He was probably related to Hugh and Walter Aston.
