= Jane Whorwood =

English Royalist agent (1612–1684)

- Born: Jane Ryder; 1612; Westminster, England
- Died: 1684 (aged 71–72)
- Occupation: Royalist agent
- Known for: Smuggling funds and intelligence for Charles I, coordinating his escape attempts
- Spouse: Brome Whorwood (m. 1634; died 1684)
- Espionage activity
- Allegiance: Royalist
- Service years: 1640s
- Codename: N

Jane Whorwood (née Ryder; 1612 – September 1684) was a Royalist agent during the English Civil War. She managed circulation of intelligence, as well as smuggling of funds to sustain the Royalist faction. Whorwood was a close confidante of King Charles I, having helped to co-ordinate his attempts to escape captivity in the late 1640s.

== Personal life ==
Jane was born in Westminster, in 1612. Her father was Scots courtier William Ryder, surveyor of the royal stables, and her mother was Elizabeth de Boussy, a laundress to Anne of Denmark, queen consort of James I of England. Soon after accompanying King James I in his return visit to Scotland, in 1617, her father died of undetermined illness. Two years later, her mother remarried to a more influential courtier, James Maxwell, himself also originally from Scotland.

Jane married Brome Whorwood, four years her junior, in 1634. However, in 1642, at the outbreak of the Civil War, her husband fled England, leaving for continental Europe where he remained until 1645. Jane Whorwood and their children Brome and Diana resided in his family property, Holton House in the outskirts of Oxford city where the Royal court was established. But Whorwood travelled continuously as an active Royalist agent.

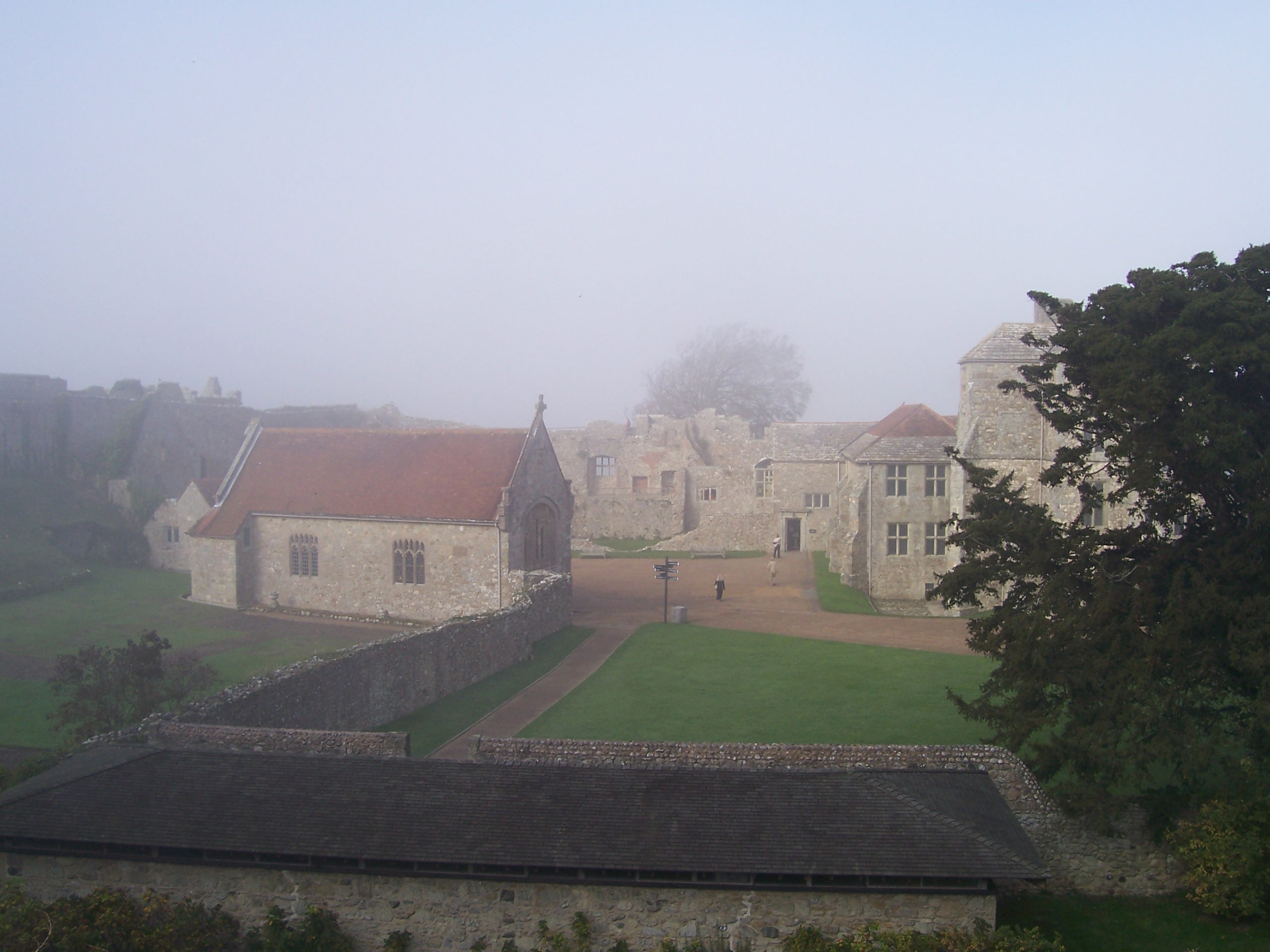
Courtyard of Carisbrooke Castle, Isle of Wight. From late April 1648 on, Charles I's chamber was located in the now ruined lodgings to the left.

== Support for the Royalist faction during the English Civil War ==
Composed of merchants and laundresses, the contact networks established by Whorwood's stepfather and mother facilitated her actions in favour of the Royalist cause. James Maxwell, her stepfather, had been a groom of the bedchamber successively to princes Henry and Charles, whose accession to the throne would occur in 1625. Maxwell assumed the office of Black Rod in 1622 and, upon the dissolution of Parliament in 1629, acted as pawnbroker and private financier to Charles I. This enabled him to work closely with merchants with whom Whorwood would co-operate in smuggling funds for the Royalists during the Civil War.

In one occasion, with the aid of a laundress, Whorwood arranged the smuggling of no less than 1,705 lbs (775 kg) of gold at once. The sum came from Royalist merchant Sir Paul Pindar, located in London, and was delivered into Oxford, concealed inside barrels of soap. In 1680, the Pindar family addressed a petition to Charles II describing these operations: "Sir Paul Pindar sent several sums of money in gold to Oxford (by the hand of Madam Jean Whorewood, yet living) in 1644, for the transporting of [the then] Prince of Wales and the late Queen, his mother, to France."

Whorwood remained an active supporter of Charles I throughout most of the 1640s, being invested in gathering more funds, helping to create a network of Royalist contacts extending from London to Edinburgh, and covertly relaying intelligence amongst the king's supporters, as well as from and to the king himself. In addition, she was involved in co-ordinating Charles I's attempts to escape captivity, seeking for this purpose guidance from famed astrologer William Lilly, whose advice she requested in 1647 concerning the king's plans to flee Hampton Court where he was being held captive by Parliament. It was also Lilly who, in 1648, the year prior to Charles I's execution, provided her with the contact of a locksmith from whom to obtain files and aqua fortis to be used on the window bars of the king's chamber at Carisbrooke Castle, Isle of Wight. Charles was, however, unsuccessful in his attempt, leaving Whorwood to wait several weeks aboard a ship she had helped to obtain with the aim of sailing him to Holland.

== Physical appearance ==
From this period, a key description of Jane Whorwood, of whom no portraits have been discovered, emerges. Following his observation of Whorwood while aboard the vessel on the coast of Wight, Parliament spy Anthony Wood noted in a report dating from 30 April 1648: "Mistress Whorwood is (…) a tall, well-fashioned and well-languaged gentlewoman, with a round visage and with pock holes in her face".

Decades later, he would add to this characterisation: “…red haired, as her son Brome was (…) exceedingly loyal, understanding and of good judgement (…) the most loyal to King Charles in his miseries of any woman in England".

== Relationship with the King of England ==
Ciphered letters sent between Charles I and Whorwood, indicated that she became the king's mistress during the summer of 1648, when Whorwood managed to gain access to the king's chamber in Carisbrooke Castle, the king having been granted parole from close guard to prepare negotiations with Parliament. They communicated frequently, and sometimes exchanged several notes per day, letters were sent during July, which contained plans for intimate encounters. The king wrote to their accomplice William Hopkins in the same year: "You may freely trust Whorwood with anything that concerns my service, for I have had perfect trial of her friendship to me. I cannot be more confident of any". He noted that between April, and December 1648, (Thirty -Three) 33 letters were written to Whorwood and 18 was sent from her to him. She signed her ciphered notes as N, 390, 409, and 715, then signed the remaining as JW or Hellen.

Despite his supporters' continuous efforts to restore his freedom, Charles I was brought to trial and executed at Whitehall Palace, in London, on 30 January 1649.

== Life after war ==
Whorwood underwent a brief period of imprisonment herself in 1651, under the Commonwealth, along with a fine for having defrauded the Parliamentary Committee for the Advance of Money in her efforts to finance the Royalists. During that same year, Whorwood returned home to her increasingly violent husband, Brome. Then devoted to his mistress Katherine Allen, Brome subjected Whorwood to verbal abuse, serious injuries and a period of confinement in the tower of Holton House, which the three of them shared. In 1657, the year their son died while, incidentally, sailing to Isle of Wight, Whorwood left home permanently, fearing for her life.

A longstanding legal battle for alimony followed the couple's formal separation in 1659, lasting virtually until their deaths. Brome, who became MP for the House of Commons in 1661, one year after Charles II's Restoration to the throne, refused to comply with court and Crown orders to provide his wife with payments. Ultimately he only granted Whorwood a small portion of the monetary compensation she was legally entitled to, leaving her impoverished. Holton locals defended Whorwood in court on multiple occasions, testifying as to the abusive treatment and the extent of the violence she suffered while with her husband.

Brome died in April 1684, and Jane Whorwood in September the same year, aged 72. On the subject of her own efforts to support the Royalists, wholly unrecognised during the Restoration period and overlooked thereafter, Jane Whorwood wrote, in 1648: "My travels, the variety of accidents (and especially dangers) more become a Romance than a letter."

== Notes and references ==
1.Fox, Chapter 5, para. 38
2.Fox, Chapter 5, para. 2
3.Fox, Chapter 8, para. 38
4.Fox, Chapter 1, para. 1
5.Fox, Chapter 1, para. 2
6.Fox, Chapter 9, para. 38
7.Poynting, pp. 128–40
8.Fox, Chapter 8, para. 2
9.Fox, Chapter 11, para. 11
10.Fox, Chapter 11, para. 41

== Sources ==
• Firth, Charles Harding (1885). Whorwood, Jane. Dictionary of National Biography. London: Smith, Elder & Co.
• Fox, John (2010). The King’s Smuggler : Jane Whorwood, Secret Agent to Charles I [Kindle version]. Gloucestershire: The History Press.
• Poynting, Sarah (2006). Deciphering the King: Charles I's Letters to Jane Whorwood. The Seventeenth Century, 21 (1), 128–40.
