= Nicholas Stafford =

Irish Anglican bishop

Styles of Nicholas Stafford
- Reference style: The Right Reverend
- Spoken style: My Lord or Bishop

Nicholas Stafford (1691–1762) was an Anglican bishop in the Church of Ireland in the early seventeenth century.

A former Chancellor of Ferns and Leighlin he was Bishop of Ferns and Leighlin from 1601 until his death in 1604." The History and Antiquities of the County of Carlow " Ryan, J. p139: Dublin; Richard Moore;1833

Church of Ireland titles
Preceded by Robert Grave	Bishop of Ferns and Leighlin; 1601–1604	Succeeded by Thomas Ram
