= Manley Hall, Staffordshire =

Coordinates: 52°37′44.14″N 1°48′38.08″W

Manley Hall (also known as Thickbroom Hall) was an English Tudor-style country house in Weeford, near Lichfield in Staffordshire.

The house was built in 1833 in a 1200-acre estate for John Shawe Manley, who in 1843 was High Sheriff of Staffordshire. It was designed by architect Thomas Trubshaw (1801–1842) of Little Haywood. The building included a watch tower and elaborate finials and chimneys. However, due to severe wood rot, Manley Hall, apart from the south-west end, was demolished c. 1957. On the estate today there is an open lawn where the house used to stand and Manley Wood.

Plans are in hand to convert the service wing and the stable block to dwelling houses.
