= Sir Roger de Pyvelesdon =

English sheriff during the middle ages

Sir Roger de Pyvelesdon (otherwise 'Puleston' etc.) is cited as Sheriff of Shropshire and Staffordshire c.1240s.

He died in 1272 and his son and namesake Sir Roger de Puleston erected a market cross in his father's memory. This is confirmed in a deed dated 1285, signed by Roger (the son), which included these words: the cross set up for the soul of Roger de Pyvelesdon who died in 1272.
