= Richard Trentham =

16th-century English politician

Richard Trentham (by 1515 – January 1547) was an English politician.

His father was Thomas Trentham of Shrewsbury from whom he inherited land in Shropshire.

He entered the royal household and was an Esquire of the Household by 1537 and cupbearer in the household of Prince Edward by 1544. In 1545 he fought with the king in France.

He was elected Member of Parliament (MP) of the Parliament of England for Shropshire in 1536.

In 1539 he acquired the site of Rocester Abbey, Staffordshire which had been closed down as part of the Dissolution of the Monasteries and reestablished his family there. He had married Mary, the daughter of David Ireland of Shrewsbury and had one son and heir, Thomas and 5 daughters.
