= Thomas Trentham (died c. 1519) =

English politician

Thomas Trentham (by 1487 – 1519?) was an English politician.

He was the son of Thomas Trentham of Shrewsbury and Catherine, daughter of John Marshall of Hurst, and followed his father into the drapery business.

He was elected a Member of Parliament (MP) in the Parliament of England for Shrewsbury in 1512 and 1515. He fought in France in 1513 under George Talbot, 4th Earl of Shrewsbury.

He married Elizabeth, the daughter of Sir Richard Corbet of Moreton Corbet and had two sons and five daughters. His son, Richard Trentham, was MP for Shropshire.
