= Sir Roger de Pulesdon =

Sir Roger de Pulesdon (otherwise 'Pyvelesdon' / Puleston etc) from Puleston in Shropshire, was the son of Sir Roger de Pyvelesdon, who was commemorated by his son and namesake with a Market Cross ('the Puleston Cross') in Newport, near the family's home.

He is found recorded as Sheriff of Staffordshire and Salop in 1285.

Sir Roger (the son) was appointed by Edward I as the first High Sheriff of Anglesey following the defeat, occupation and dismemberment of the Kingdom of Gwynedd in 1284. His tenure came to an end at the height of the rising of Madoc ap Llywelyn in 1295. The hated sheriff was seized and hanged by the Anglesey Welshmen during a sudden raid on the borough of Caernarvon.
