= John de Aston (knight banneret) =

English knight and politician

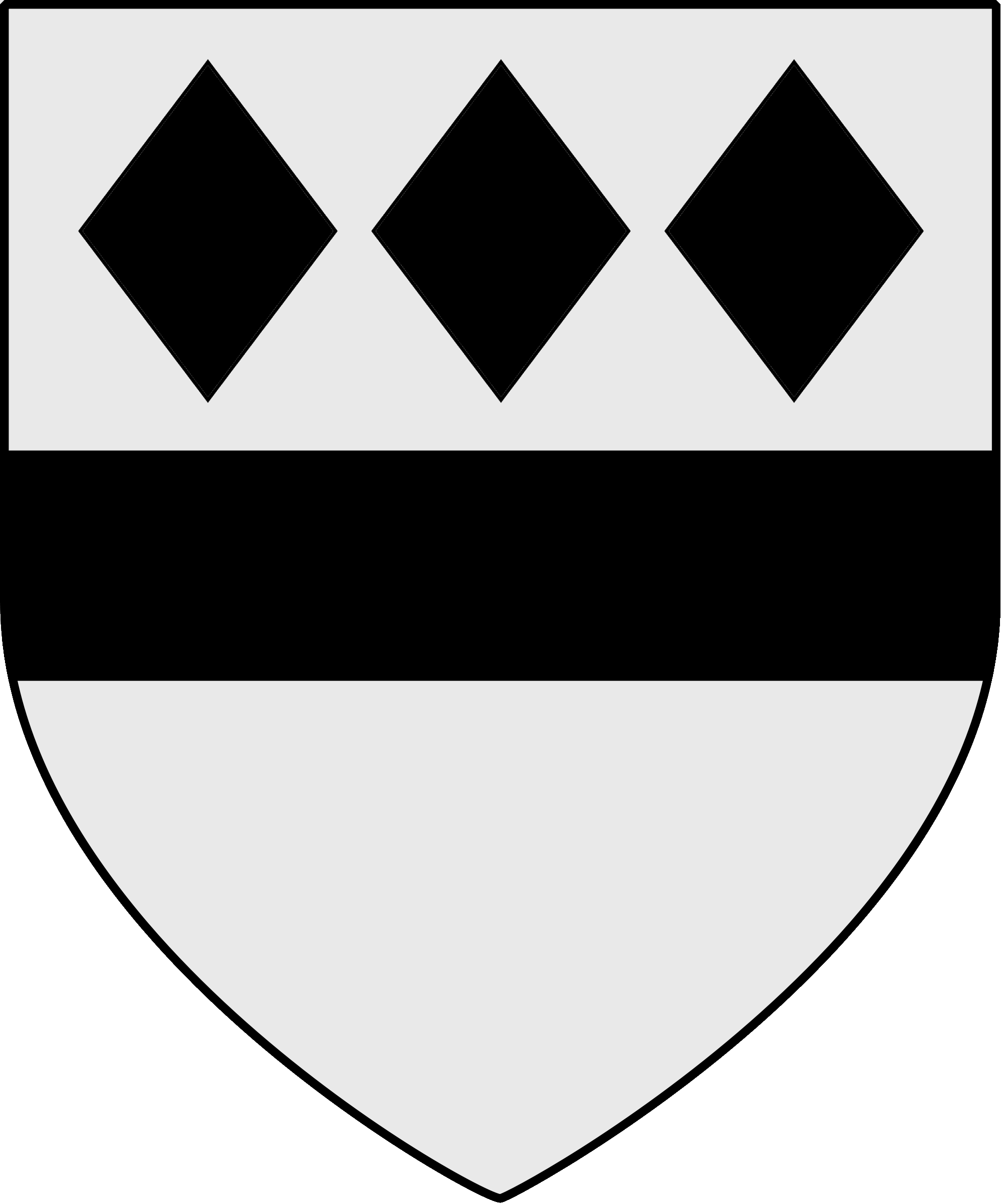
Arms of Ashton/Aston of Tixhall, Staffordshire: Argent, a fess and in chief three lozenges in fess sable

Sir John de Aston, K.B. (died 1523) of Heywood, Staffordshire, was a soldier of great eminence during the reigns of Kings Henry VII and Henry VIII. He served three times as Sheriff of Staffordshire and once as Sheriff of Leicestershire and Warwickshire.

== Biography ==
John Aston was the son and heir of John de Aston (fl. 1475) of Parkhall and Heywood by his wife Elizabeth Delves, a daughter of Sir John Delves, of Dodrington, Cheshire.

Aston was made a Knight of the Bath, at the marriage of Prince Arthur, eldest son of Henry VII, to Catherine of Aragon, Infanta of Spain, (later the wife of his younger brother Henry VIII) which was celebrated in the year 1502.

Sir John was Sheriff of Leicestershire and Warwickshire in 1510–1511, and thrice Sheriff of Staffordshire (in 1500–1501, 1508–1509, 1513–1514).

Sir John accompanied Henry VIII in the Anglo-French War of 1513, and was made a knight banneret for his conduct at the Battle of the Spurs. He also distinguished himself at the Siege of Thérouanne and Tournay.

Maitland in his History of London records a charitable association, of which Sir John Aston was one of the members and founders:

There was a very noble Guild, or fraternity, founded in the church of St. Catherine's Hospital, in honor of St. Barbara. It was governed by a master and three wardens. It had two royal founders, King Henry VIII. and Queen Katharine his first wife; and many very high and honourable persons associated themselves as members and founders of the said confraternity ...

== Death and burial ==
Sir John died on 14 March 1523, and he was succeeded by his eldest son Sir Edward Aston of Tixall. Sir John was buried by the side of his wife, in All Saints Church, Church Leigh, the parish church of Leigh, Staffordshire, where a handsome marble monument richly gilded, was erected to her memory. The manor of Leigh (and the manor house known as Park Hall in Church Leigh) was acquired by the Aston family on the marriage of Sir Thomas Aston to Elizabeth de Legh, a sister and co-heiress of Reginald de Legh, of Leigh.

On the top of the monument are the figures of Sir John habited as a knight in complete armour, and his lady lying by him, their hands joined, and elevated in a praying posture, with appropriate emblems of valour and virtue, at the head and feet. The monument stands lengthways against the wall, and on the opposite side are six niches, with two human figures in each. At the head are also three niches, with two figures in each, and at the foot of the monument there are three, each filled with an angel, supporting a coat of arms. Round the verge is this inscription:

Hic jacent corpora Domini Johannis Aston Militis, et Domimæ Johannæ Aston, uxoris ejus, qui quidem Dominus Johannes obiit decimo octavo die Mensis Maii, Anno Domini 1523. Et prædicta Domina Johanna obiit, —— die Mensis —— Anno Dom. 15——.

== Marriage and issue ==
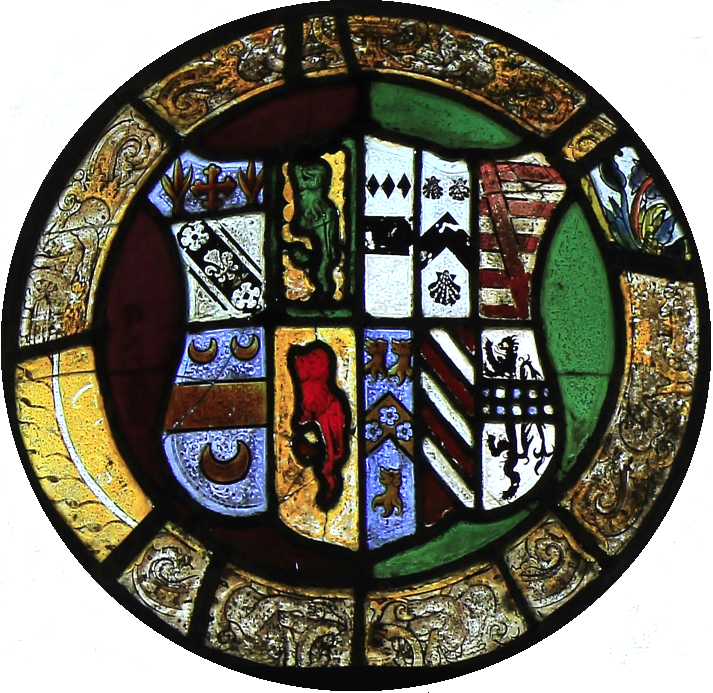
Arms of Elyn Aston, a daughter of Sir John Aston, impaled by those of her husband John Morgan (d.1535) of Mapperton Hall, Dorset. Stained Glass, All Saints Church, Mapperton. In the second quarter of the female half are the arms of Lyttleton, followed by quarterings of Lyttleton

Sir John Aston married Joan Littleton, the daughter and heiress of Sir William Littleton (1450–1507) of Tixhall Hall, Staffordshire, eldest son and heir of Sir Thomas Littleton, by his first wife, Ellen Walsh, a daughter of William Walsh/Welsh/Walsshe/Waleys of Wanlip in Leicestershire. Joan Littleton inherited the manor of Wanlip from her mother, Ellen Walsh. Through this marriage the manor of Tixall also came to the Aston family, having been purchased by Sir Thomas Littleton from the heiress Rosede Wasteneys. Sir John Aston had issue by his wife Joan Littleton including:

- Edward Aston (died 1568), son and heir, who built Tixall Gatehouse, the only surviving part of Tixall Hall.
- William Aston of Millewitch.
- Isabel Aston.
- Elizabeth Aston.
- Elyn Aston, wife of John Morgan (d.1535) of Mapperton Hall, Dorset. Her arms, with six quarters, impaled by Morgan, survive in a stained glass window in All Saints' Church, Mapperton.
