= John Puleston (judge) =

Welsh judge

John Puleston (c.1583–1659) was a Welsh barrister and judge.

== Life ==
He was son of Richard Puleston of Emral, Flintshire, by Alice, his wife, daughter of David Lewis of Burcot in Oxfordshire. He was a member of the Middle Temple, and reader of his inn in 1634, was recommended by the House of Commons as a baron of the exchequer in February 1643. The king Charles I not appointing him, he received by parliamentary order the degree of serjeant-at-law on 12 October 1648.

Puleston was appointed by parliament a justice of the common pleas on 1 June 1649. With Francis Thorpe, he tried John Morris, governor of Pontefract Castle, at York assizes for high treason in August of the same year. He was also, with Philip Jermyn, appointed in the same year to try John Lilburne. He was a commissioner in April 1650, under the proposed act for establishing a high court of justice, and was placed in the commission of December 1650 for the trial of offenders in Norfolk.

During the Interregnum, it is now recognised, a group of barristers from the common law tradition, as justices, preserved it as an active force in the judiciary. Puleston was one such judge, with Sir John Glyn, Sir Matthew Hale, Robert Nicholas and Peter Warburton.Oliver Cromwell, on becoming Lord Protector in 1653, did not renew Puleston's patent. He died 5 September 1659.

== Family ==
Puleston's wife Elizabeth, daughter of Sir Francis Wolryche of Dudmaston Hall, predeceased him in 1658. By her he had two sons, to whom Philip Henry was appointed tutor on 30 September 1653, succeeding Thomas Chaloner. Hamlet Puleston the writer was Puleston's nephew.

== Notes ==
Attribution

This article incorporates text from a publication now in the public domain: Lee, Sidney, ed. (1896). "Puleston, John". Dictionary of National Biography. Vol. 47. London: Smith, Elder & Co.
