= Rocester Abbey =

Medieval monastic house in Rocester, Staffordshire, England

Coordinates: 52.951243°N 1.8352962°W

Rocester Abbey was a medieval monastic house at Rocester, Staffordshire, England of which there is now no trace above ground level.

The Augustinian abbey of St. Mary, Rocester was founded in Dovedale between 1141 and 1146 by Richard Bacon, a half brother-in-law of Ranulph, 6th Earl of Chester and a son-in-law of Hugh de Kevelioc, the previous earl. The Earls of Chester were the early patrons of the abbey until the death of the 7th Earl in 1237, after which the earldom was annexed to the Crown, who thereby took over the patronage. Nevertheless, the abbey, a relatively small one, was also commensurately poor. Improved funding in the 13th century and the granting to them of the right to hold a weekly market and an annual fair at Rocester improved their situation.

In 1538, the abbey was finally dissolved as part of the Dissolution of the Monasteries. At the time the abbey was dissolved there were only 9 monks there, including the abbot. Most of the building was dismantled for its reusable materials and the land sold to Richard Trentham, the MP for Shropshire. He relocated his family there, where a manor house was built, and the property subsequently passed down in the Trentham family.

The site today is known as Abbey Fields and is an open space with traces of an earlier Roman Fort.
