= Edward Littleton =

Edward Littleton may refer to:

- Edward Littleton, 1st Baron Lyttelton (1589–1645), chief justice of North Wales
- Edward Littleton (colonial administrator) (died 1705), administrator of the English East India Company
- Sir Edward Littleton (died 1558) (c. 1489–1558), MP for Staffordshire in five parliaments, including the Reformation Parliament
- Sir Edward Littleton (died 1574), sheriff of Staffordshire, 1563
- Sir Edward Littleton (died 1610) (c. 1555–1610), participant in the Essex Rebellion, MP for Staffordshire, 1604
- Sir Edward Littleton (died 1629) (c. 1577–1629), MP for Staffordshire in the Happy Parliament, 1624
- Sir Edward Littleton, 1st Baronet (c. 1599–c. 1657), English Baronet, politician and combatant in the English Civil War
- Sir Edward Littleton, 2nd Baronet (c. 1632–1709), MP for Staffordshire in the Cavalier Parliament, 1661–79
- Sir Edward Littleton, 3rd Baronet (died 1742), High Sheriff of Staffordshire
- Sir Edward Littleton, 4th Baronet (1727–1812), MP for Staffordshire, 1784–1812
- Edward Littleton, 1st Baron Hatherton (1791–1863), British politician
- Edward Littleton, 2nd Baron Hatherton (1815–1888), British peer and Liberal member of parliament

== See also ==
- Littleton baronets
- Baron Hatherton
- Baron Lyttelton
