= John Grey (Staffordshire MP) =

English politician

Hon. John Grey (died 1709), of Enville Hall, Staffordshire, was an English politician who sat in the House of Commons at various times between 1660 and 1698.

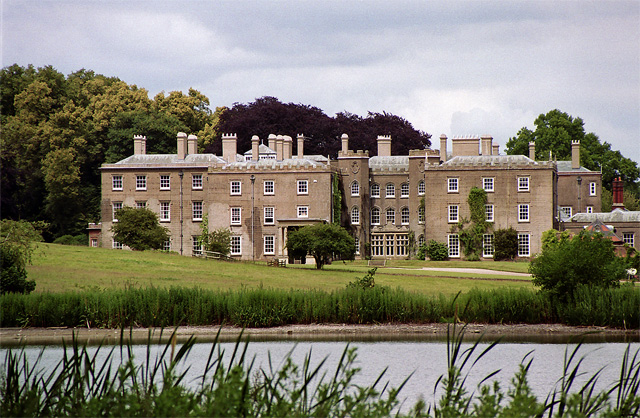
Enville Hall, Staffordshire

Grey was the third son of Henry Grey, 1st Earl of Stamford and Lady Anne Cecil, youngest daughter and coheiress of William Cecil, 2nd Earl of Exeter, whose second son was Anchitell Grey, the Parliamentary diarist. In 1660 he was elected Member of Parliament for Leicester in the Convention Parliament. He was elected MP for Leicester again in 1677 in a by-election to the Cavalier Parliament and was returned again for the two elections in 1679 and in 1681. He inherited the Enville estate under the will of his cousin Henry Grey who died in 1687. In 1689 he was elected MP for Staffordshire and was re-elected in 1690 and 1695.

Grey married:

1. Mary daughter of Sir Francis Wolryche of Dudmaston by whom he had a daughter Mary, who married William Ward of Willingsworth. Their son was John Ward who succeeded as 6th Baron Ward and to the entailed portion of the Dudley estates in 1740, and was created Viscount Dudley and Ward in 1763.
2. Catherine, eldest daughter of Edward Ward, 7th Baron Dudley, 2nd Baron Ward (on 21 November 1683). They had:
- A son Henry, who succeeded him to the Enville estate and succeeded his cousin as Earl of Stamford in 1720, and
- A daughter Mary, who married Sir John Wrottesley, 4th baronet.

Parliament of England
Preceded by Edward Littleton; Sir Walter Bagot	Member of Parliament for Staffordshire; 1689–1698; With: Sir Walter Bagot 1689–1690; Walter Chetwynd 1690–1693; Sir Walter Bagot 1693–1695; Henry Paget 1695–1698	Succeeded by Edward Bagot; Henry Paget
