= Edward Bagot =

Edward Bagot may refer to:

- Alec Bagot (Edward Daniel Alexander Bagot, 1893–1968), member of the South Australian Legislative Council
- Sir Edward Bagot, 2nd Baronet (1616–1673), English landowner and politician
- Sir Edward Bagot, 4th Baronet (1674–1712), English politician
- Edward Meade Bagot (1822–1886), pastoralist and developer in Central Australia
