= Edward Littleton (colonial administrator) =

British administrator of the East India Company (died 1705)

- Died: 1705
- Occupation: Colonial Administrator
- Known for: President of Bengal

Sir Edward Littleton (died 1705) was an administrator of the English East India Company. He served as President of Bengal in the early eighteenth century.

Littleton was the eldest son of Sir Edward Littleton, 2nd Baronet. He studied at The Queen's College, Oxford, and in 1671 married Susannah, daughter of Sir Theophilus Biddulph. From 1685 until 1689, he sat as Member of Parliament (MP) for Staffordshire.

Littleton was expelled from the East India Company in 1682. Later he was a founding director of the New East India Company, and was sent out to Bengal to act as president in its interest. He was knighted early in 1699. Later in that year he was at Calcutta, opposing John Beard of the old Company in Indian matters. It was some years before the two companies were amalgamated.

Parliament of England
Preceded by Sir John Bowyer; Sir Walter Bagot	Member of Parliament for Staffordshire; 1685–1689; With: Sir Walter Bagot	Succeeded by John Grey; Sir Walter Bagot
Political offices
Preceded by John Beard	President of Bengal; 1701– 1705	Succeeded by Council
