= Walter Chetwynd =

English antiquary and politician

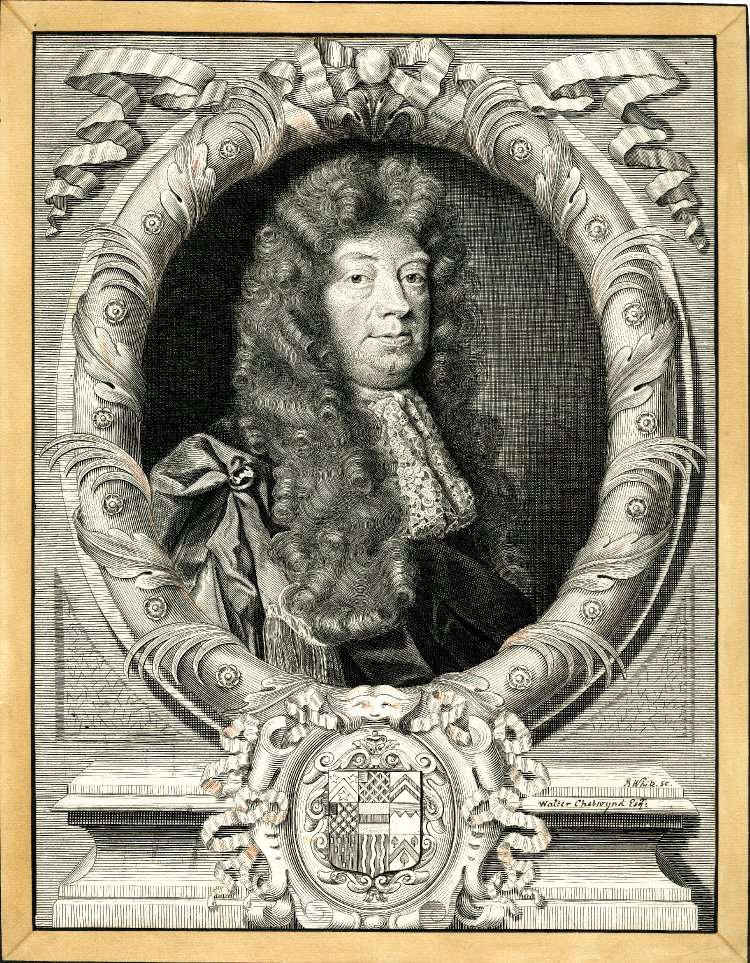
Walter Chetwynd

Walter Chetwynd FRS (1 May 1633 – 21 March 1693), of Ingestre Hall, Staffordshire was an English antiquary and politician.

== Life ==
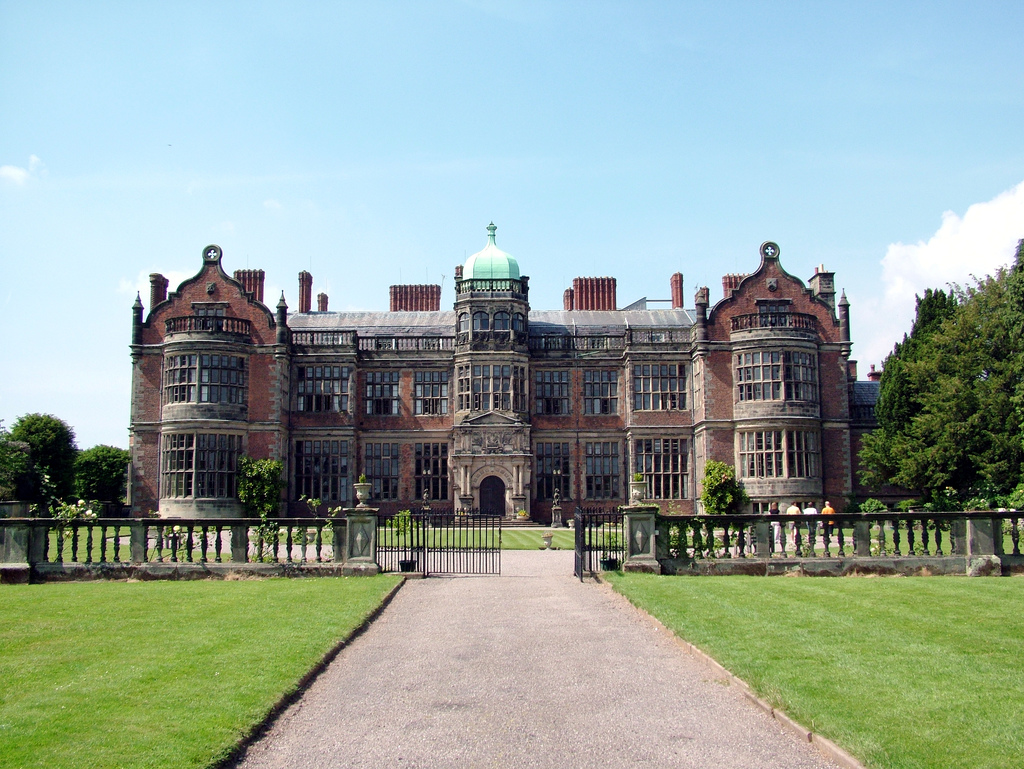
Ingestre Hall, Staffordshire

He was the only child of Walter Chetwynd (1598–1669), the eldest son of Walter Chetwynd (died 1638), who built Ingestre Hall. He was admitted to the Middle Temple in 1657, but returned his native Staffordshire and occupied various local offices.

In 1674, he was elected as Member of Parliament for Stafford when the sitting member died, but lost his seat in the second election of 1679. During the Popish Plot, he supported Titus Oates, but in 1682, he was providing information on the Staffordshire activities of the Duke of Monmouth. He regained Stafford in 1685 even though he had been appointed Sheriff of Staffordshire for that year. His attitude the Glorious Revolution was cautious, reporting the passage through Staffordshire of troops hostile to James II and did not sit in the Convention Parliament, but was elected for Staffordshire in 1690, greeting William III on his arrival at Lichfield in 1690.

Chetwynd was also significant as a historian of his native county, building on the work of Sampson Erdeswicke. He began work on this subject in the 1660s and worked on it for the rest of his life. In doing this, he was following on the work of William Dugdale on Warwickshire. His writing of "A Short Account of Staffordshire" began in 1679, but by 1688, he had only covered Pirehill Hundred in the northwest of the county. This remained unpublished until the early 20th century, when William Salt Archaeological Society published it in two of their volumes in 1909 and 1914.

He was elected a Fellow of the Royal Society in 1678, but took little part in its activities. He probably knew Christopher Wren, who was probably the architect of his new church at Ingestre, started in 1673 and completed in 1676. His interests were widespread, including numismatics, literature, theology, mathematics, but above all antiquities and natural history. Thus he gave hospitality and help to Robert Plot while he wrote his Natural History of Staffordshire from 1679. He was a hospitable and convivial man.

He died in London in 1693 of smallpox and was buried at Ingestre.

== Family ==
On 14 Sept. 1668, he married Anne, eldest daughter of Sir Edward Bagot, 2nd Baronet, of Blithfield, Staffordshire, leaving an only daughter, Frances, who died in her infancy. The Ingestre estate passed to his cousin Walter Chetwynd who was created Viscount Chetwynd.

== Notes ==
Parliament of England
Preceded by Robert Milward; William Chetwynd	Member of Parliament for Stafford; 1674–1679; With: William Chetwynd 1674–1679; Sir Thomas Armstrong 1679	Succeeded by Sir Thomas Armstrong; Sir Thomas Wilbraham
Preceded by Sir Thomas Armstrong; Edwin Skrymsher	Member of Parliament for Stafford; 1685–1689; With: Rowland Okeover	Succeeded by Philip Foley; John Chetwynd
Preceded by Sir Walter Bagot; John Grey	Member of Parliament for Staffordshire; 1690–1693; With: John Grey	Succeeded by Sir Walter Bagot; John Grey
