= Sir John Bowyer, 2nd Baronet =

English politician

Sir John Bowyer, 2nd Baronet (25 April 1653 – 18 July 1691) was an English politician.

He was the oldest son of Sir John Bowyer, 1st Baronet, and Mary Milward, daughter of Robert Milward. Bowyer was educated at Christ Church, Oxford, and graduated with a Master of Arts (MA) in 1669. Three years ago, he had succeeded his father as baronet. Bowyer was High Sheriff of Staffordshire between 1677 and 1678. He sat then as Member of Parliament (MP) for Warwick from 1678 until 1679 and for Staffordshire from 1679 until 1685.

On 10 July 1672, he married Hon. Jane Murray, daughter of Henry Murray and the Viscountess Bayning. Bowyer was buried at Biddulph in Staffordshire, and was succeeded in the baronetcy by his only son John.

Parliament of England
Preceded by The Lord Digby; Sir Francis Compton	Member of Parliament for Warwick; 1678–1679; With: Sir Francis Compton	Succeeded by Sir John Clopton; Sir Henry Puckering
Preceded by Sir Edward Littleton; Randolph Egerton	Member of Parliament for Staffordshire; 1679–1685; With: Sir Walter Bagot	Succeeded by Sir Walter Bagot; Edward Littleton
Baronetage of England
Preceded by John Bowyer	Baronet (of Knipersley); 1666–1691	Succeeded by John Bowyer
