= Henry Paget, 1st Earl of Uxbridge (first creation) =

British politician (1663–1743)

The Right Honourable The Earl of Uxbridge PC DL JP
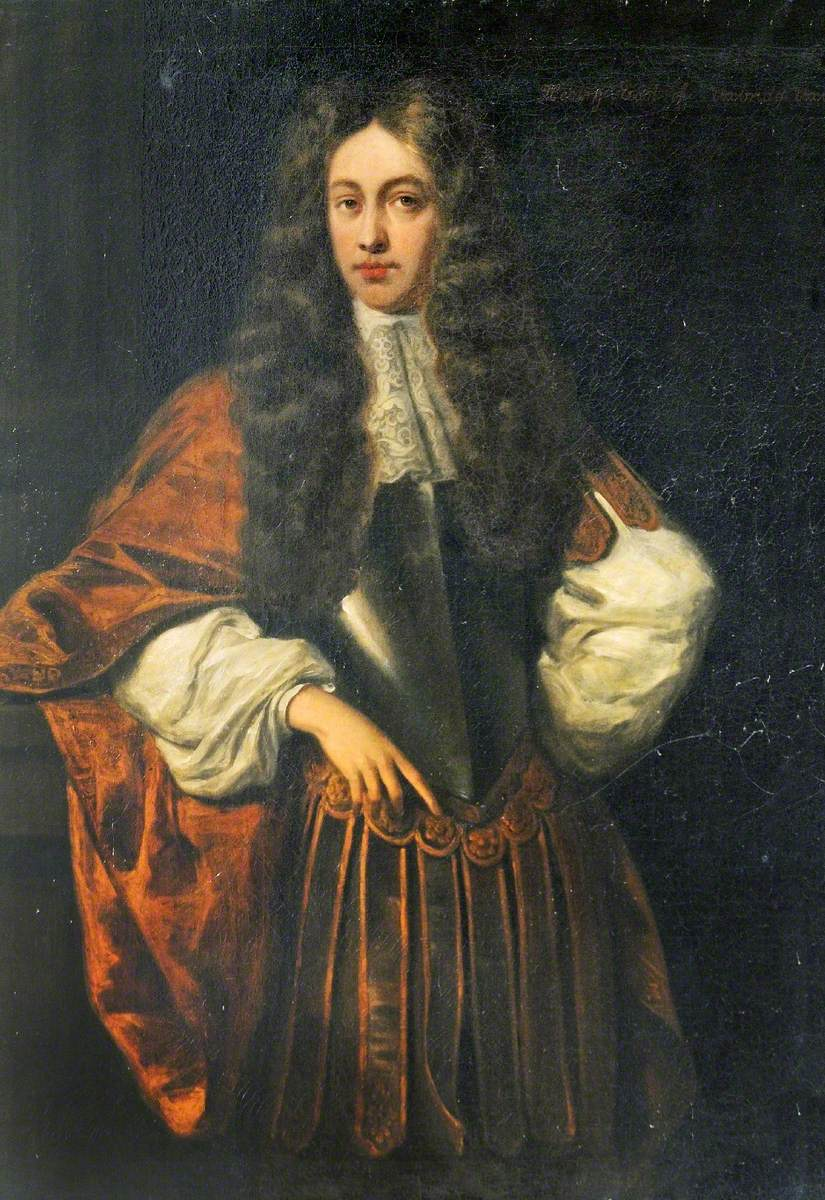

Member of Parliament for Staffordshire
- In office 1707–1712 Serving with Sir Edward Bagot, John Wrottesley, William Ward
- Preceded by: Parliament of England
- Succeeded by: William Ward; Charles Bagot
- In office 1695–1707 Serving with John Grey, Sir Edward Bagot
- Preceded by: Sir Walter Bagot; John Grey
- Succeeded by: Parliament of Great Britain

Personal details
- Born: Henry Paget; 13 January 1663
- Died: 30 August 1743 (aged 80) West Drayton
- Spouses: Mary Catesby (m. 1686; died 1734) Elizabeth Bagot (m. 1739)
- Relations: Francis Pierrepoint (grandfather); Henry Paget, 2nd Earl of Uxbridge (grandson)
- Children: Thomas Paget, Lord Paget (son)
- Parent(s): William Paget, 6th Baron Paget; Frances Pierrepont

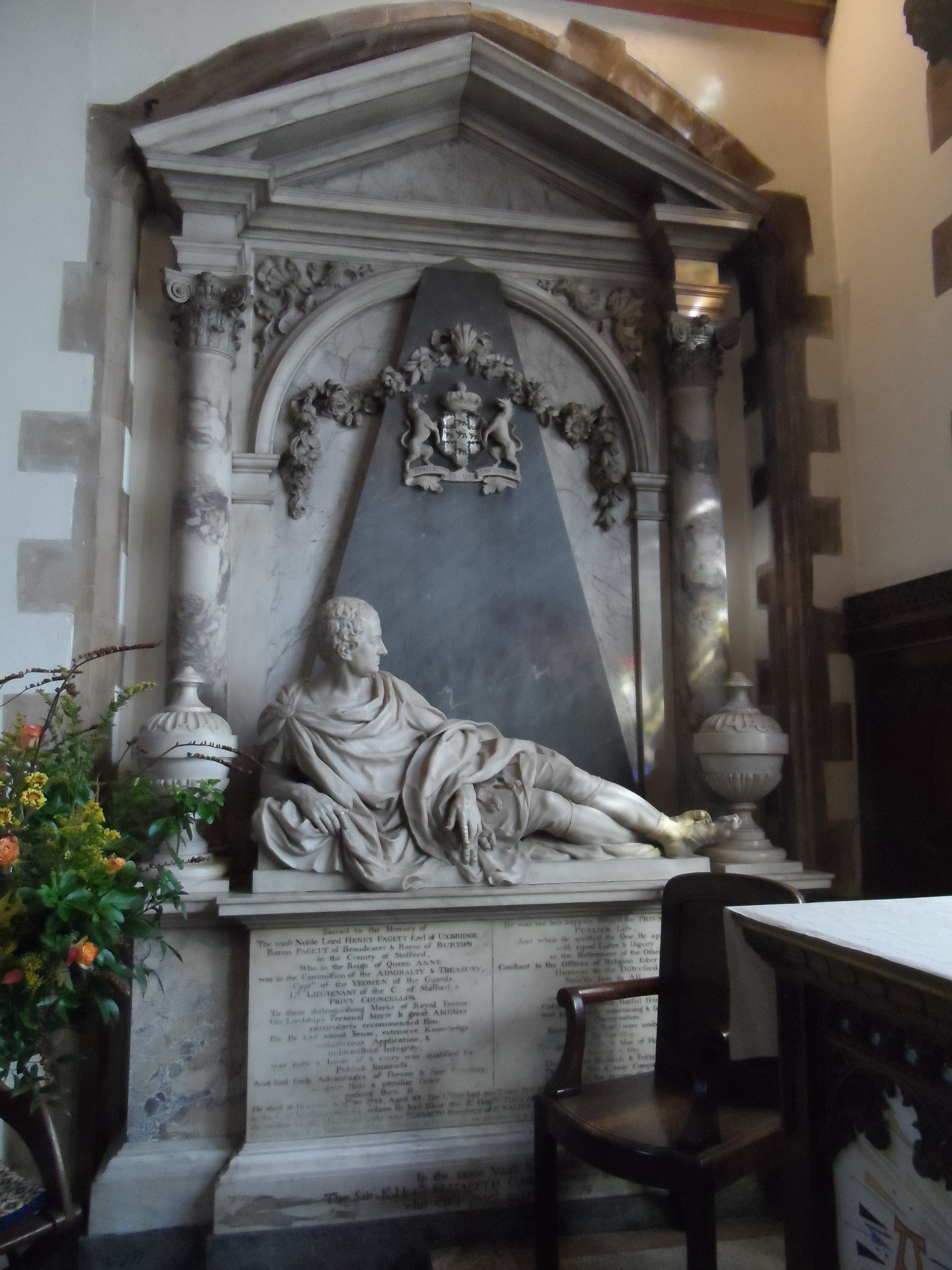
Monument to Lord Henry Pagett in St John the Baptist's Church, Hillingdon

Henry Paget, 1st Earl of Uxbridge PC (13 January 1663 – 30 August 1743), of Beaudesert, Staffordshire, and West Drayton, Middlesex, was a British landowner and Tory politician who sat in the English and British House of Commons from 1695 until 1712 when he was raised to the peerage as Baron Burton as one of Harley's Dozen. He was a Hanoverian Tory, supportive of the Hanoverian Succession.

== Personal life ==
Paget was the son of William Paget, 6th Baron Paget, and his first wife Frances Pierrepont, daughter of Hon. Francis Pierrepoint. She was a granddaughter of Robert Pierrepont, 1st Earl of Kingston-upon-Hull.

== Career ==
Paget was appointed a deputy lieutenant for Middlesex on 6 April 1689 and Staffordshire on 14 May 1689. He was elected Member of Parliament for Staffordshire on 7 November 1695 as a Tory. In 1702 he was made a deputy lieutenant for Buckinghamshire.

On 30 April 1704 Paget was appointed one of the Council advising the Lord High Admiral, Prince George of Denmark, and served until the Prince's death on 28 October 1708. He was also a Lord Commissioner of the Treasury between 10 August 1710 and 30 May 1711. On 13 June 1711 he was appointed Captain of the Yeomen of the Guard, being made a Privy Counsellor the next day and being raised to the House of Lords as Baron Burton, of Burton in the County of Stafford, on 1 January 1712. On 26 February 1713 he succeeded his father as 7th Baron Paget of Beaudesert, and was also appointed to succeed him as Lord Lieutenant of Staffordshire.

On 1 May 1714 he was appointed Envoy Extraordinary to the Elector of Hanover, but refused to go unless he was made an Earl, which Queen Anne refused. However, when the Elector succeeded as King George I of Great Britain on 1 August, he raised Paget in the peerage as Earl of Uxbridge in the County of Middlesex, on 19 October 1714, and appointed him to the new Privy Council, 16 November 1714. In 1727, the Town of Uxbridge, Massachusetts Colony, was named in honour of Henry Paget, First Earl of Uxbridge.

=== Later life ===
In 1715 Lord Uxbridge ceased to be Captain of the Yeomen of the Guard and Lord Lieutenant, and took on the post of Recorder of Lichfield, in which he served until his death. In 1740, he became a justice of the peace for Cambridgeshire.

== Personal life ==
In 1686, he married Mary Catesby, the eldest daughter and co-heiress of Thomas Catesby of Whiston and Ecton and Margaret Samwell (a daughter of Richard Samwell of Upton). Together, they were the parents of:

- Thomas Catesby Paget (died 4 February 1742), styled Lord Paget, who married Lady Elizabeth Egerton, youngest daughter of John Egerton, 3rd Earl of Bridgewater and Lady Jane Paulet (a daughter of Charles Paulet, 1st Duke of Bolton).
- Lady Mary Paget, who married Stephen Metcalfe.

Lady Uxbridge died suddenly on 3 November 1734, and was buried at West Drayton on 9 November. On 7 June 1739, Lord Uxbridge remarried Elizabeth Bagot (b. 1674). She was a member of another Staffordshire county family, the daughter of the late Sir Walter Bagot, 3rd Baronet (to whose Parliamentary seat Uxbridge had succeeded in 1695). He was seventy-six and she was sixty-nine.

The Earl of Uxbridge died at West Drayton on 30 August 1743, aged eighty. As his son Thomas, Lord Paget had predeceased him the previous year, he was succeeded in his titles by his grandson Henry, who became the 2nd Earl. His widow Lady Uxbridge died on 2 September 1749.

== Sources ==
- leighrayment.com
- leighrayment.com
- Haydn's Book of Dignities
- Colley, Linda. In Defiance of Oligarchy: The Tory Party 1714-60. Cambridge University Press, 1985.
- Doyle, James William Edmund (1885). The Official Baronage of England. London: Longmans, Green. p. 548.

Parliament of England
Preceded by Sir Walter Bagot; John Grey	Member of Parliament for Staffordshire with John Grey 1685–1698; Sir Edward Bagot 1698–1707; 1695–1707	Succeeded by Parliament of Great Britain
Parliament of Great Britain
Preceded by Parliament of England	Member of Parliament for Staffordshire with Sir Edward Bagot 1707–1708; John Wrottesley 1708–1710; William Ward 1710–1712; 1707–1712	Succeeded by William Ward; Charles Bagot
Political offices
Preceded by The Viscount Townshend	Captain of the Yeomen of the Guard; 1711–1715	Succeeded by The Earl of Derby
Honorary titles
Preceded by The Lord Paget	Lord Lieutenant and Custos Rotulorum of Staffordshire; 1713–1715	Succeeded by The Earl of Bradford
Peerage of England
Preceded by William Paget	Baron Paget de Beaudesert; 1713–1743	Succeeded by Henry Paget
Peerage of Great Britain
New creation	Earl of Uxbridge; 1714–1743	Succeeded by Henry Paget
New creation	Baron Burton; 1712–1743	Succeeded by Henry Paget
