= Sir Edward Littleton, 4th Baronet =

English politician (died 1812)

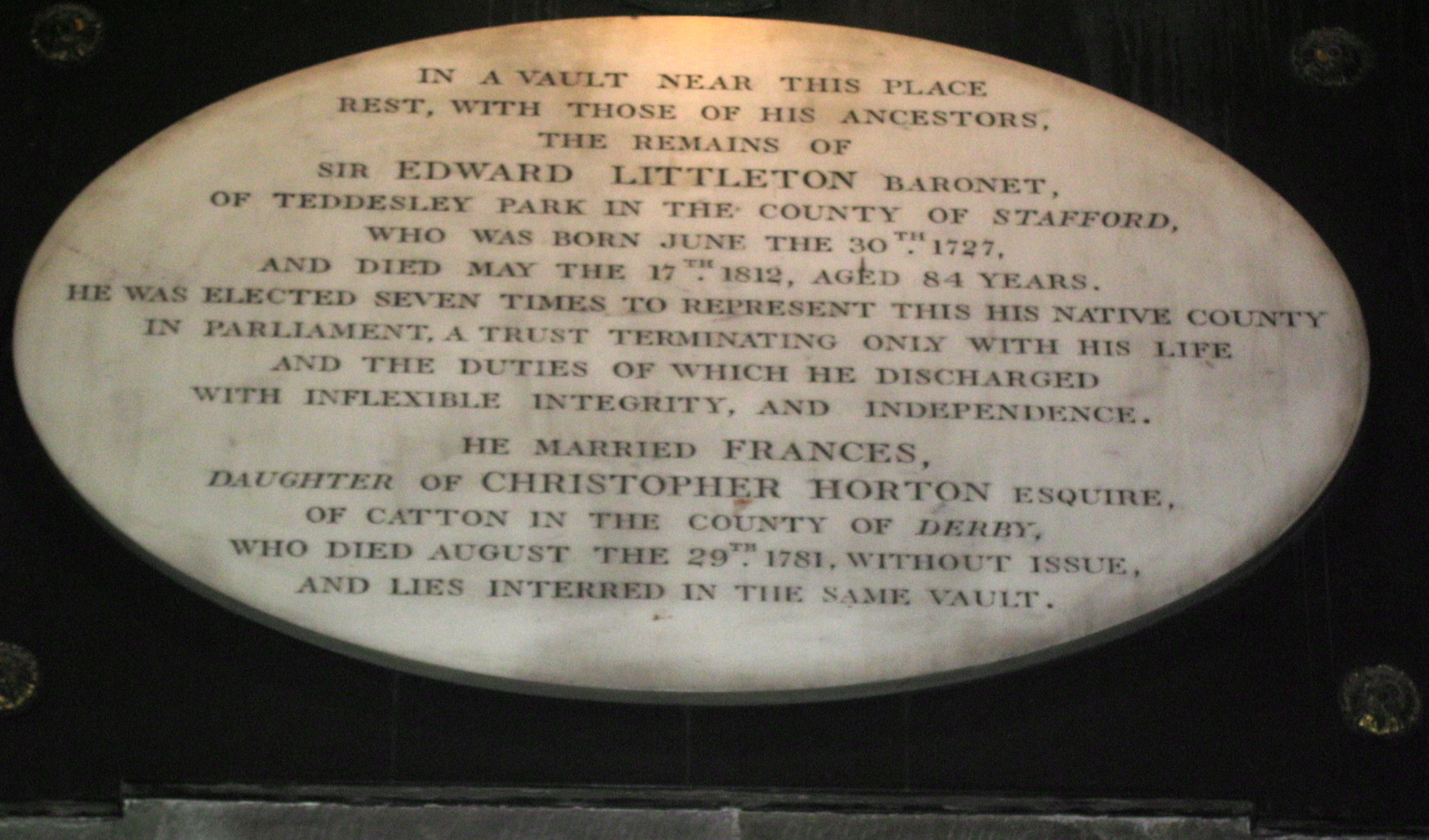
Memorial to Sir Edward Littleton, the 4th and last baronet, in St Michael's church, Penkridge. He moved the family seat to Teddesley Hall and died without issue in 1812, leaving the estates to his great-nephew, Edward Walhouse, who became Edward Littleton, 1st Baron Hatherton

Sir Edward Littleton, 4th Baronet (c. 1727–1812) was a British politician and landowner from the extended Littleton/Lyttelton family who represented Staffordshire in the Parliament of Great Britain and the Parliament of the United Kingdom for a total of 28 years. The last of the Littleton Baronets of Pillaton Hall, he transferred the family seat from eponymous Pillaton to Teddesley Hall, and died childless, leaving the estates to his great-nephew, Edward Walhouse, who became Edward Littleton, 1st Baron Hatherton.

== Background and early life ==
Edward Littleton, the 4th Baronet, was the son of Fisher Littleton' and Frances Whitehall. Edward's year of birth is generally given as 1727, although occasionally as 1725. The later date seems more likely, as he was still considered a minor as late as 1749. His mother, Frances, was the daughter and coheir of James Whitehall of Pipe Ridware, a village close to Rugeley, Staffordshire. His father had not been a baronet or head of the family, and Edward's line of succession went back to Sir Edward Littleton, 2nd Baronet.

The 3rd and 4th Baronets were cousins and both grandsons of the 2nd Baronet, who died in 1709. He had married twice and had at least 19 children. However, his eldest son, by his first marriage to Mary Wrottesley, naturally named Edward, predeceased him in 1706. The 3rd baronet was therefore a grandson, a son of the deceased Edward. The 3rd baronet died childless in 1742. This necessitated passing the title and estates to another line of descent from the second baronet. Fisher Littleton, his third son by his second wife, Joyce Littleton, was indubitably legitimate (unlike their earlier children), and had married relatively late in life. Fisher was actually a few years younger than his nephew, the Baronet. He had a young son, conveniently called Edward, who might succeed to the Littleton estates and titles.

Edward's cousin, the 3rd Baronet, sent him to nearby Brewood School, a clear sign that he regarded him as a likely heir. The school was at that time under the headship of the celebrated William Budworth, who benefited considerably from the Baronet's generosity. In 1740 Fisher Littleton died and the young Edward, while still a schoolboy, inherited his father's land. In January 1742 he also inherited the much larger estates, as well as the titles, of his cousin, the 3rd Baronet. Still a minor, he was admitted to Emmanuel College, Cambridge in 1744.

== Landowner ==
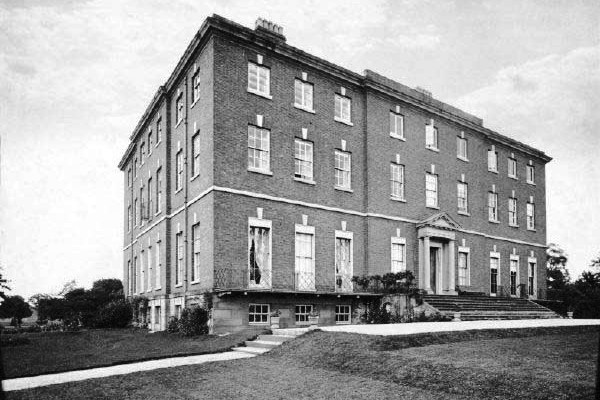
Frances Horton's home, Catton Hall, photographed in about 1875.

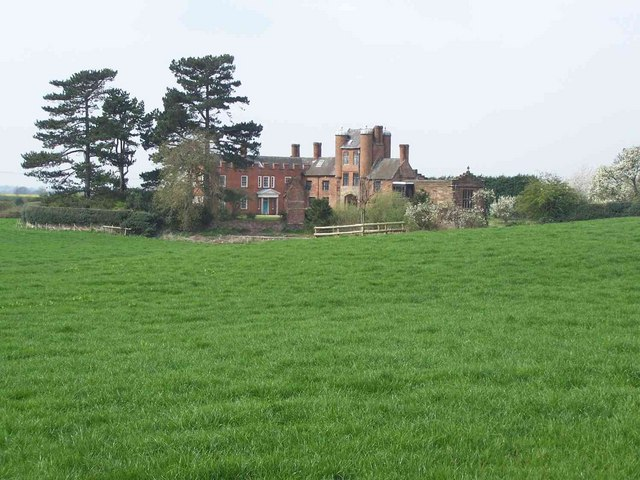
Remains of Pillaton Old Hall, near Penkridge, Staffordshire. The original moated manor house became ruinous after the Littletons abandoned it, but the Gatehouse and Chapel were restored in the 1880s.

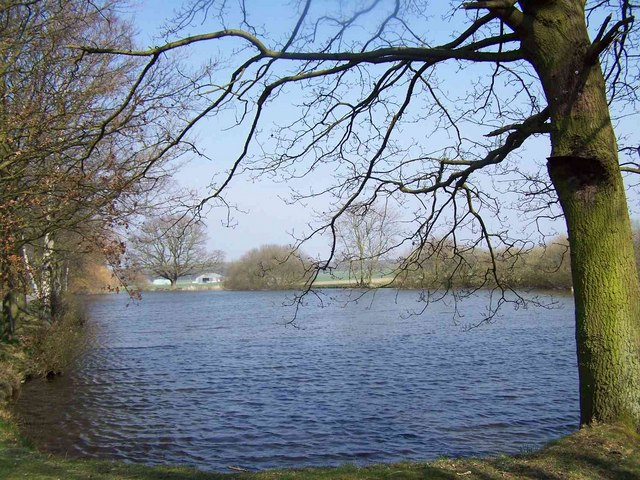
The Keeper's Pool in Teddesley Park. Teddesley Hall itself disappeared much more completely than Pillaton, as it was systematically demolished in 1954.

It was not until 1749 that Littleton became independent enough to steer a policy of his own. In that year he completed his family's dominance of the Penkridge area by buying the manor of Penkridge itself. This had been divided into two by Henry de Loundres, Archbishop of Dublin and dean of Penkridge in the 13th century. The smaller part, conferred on the Collegiate Church of St. Michael, Penkridge, and known as the deanery manor, had been leased to the Littletons even before the Reformation. The church lost it in the Dissolution of Chantries in 1547, and the Littletons were able to purchase it in the 1580s. The larger part of the manor, conferred on lay landowners, had belonged to heads of the Greville family, later Barons Brooke, since the early 16th century. However, the Grevilles had larger interests in Warwickshire, not least Warwick Castle itself. Francis Greville, who had recently been made Earl Brooke and was soon to become Earl of Warwick, decided to sell Penkridge to Littleton, giving the family not only a larger but a more compact and manageable block of estates.

On 10 May 1752 Littleton married Frances Horton, daughter of Christopher Horton of Catton Hall, near Walton-on-Trent, Derbyshire. The Hortons had just had their medieval manor house demolished to make way for a large baroque building more in keeping with the times. Pillaton Hall was a 16th-century structure, originally conceived as simply a manor house for the small Littleton estate of Pillaton and Otherton. Littleton soon began work on a new and more impressive seat for the family. It was said that two large hoards of coins were discovered in 1742 and 1749 behind panels at Pillaton Hall, which raised the sum of £15,000 on sale, and thus defrayed the costs of the new hall.

Teddesley Hall was built north-west of Penkridge, on Teddesley Hay. The Hay had been acquired about two centuries earlier, when the Tudor dynasty disposed of the old royal forest lands. It was heath and bog land, difficult to cultivate but potentially attractive. There the Littletons had Teddesley Lodge, a moated house that had accommodated junior members of the family, including an earlier Fisher Littleton, who had helped recover the family property after the English Civil War.

Teddesley Hall was constructed on a new site, about 200 metres from the Lodge. It was large but austere, a three-storied, square, brick structure, with seven windows on the upper storeys on all four faces. The main building was linked by curved screen walls to flanking ranges, one housing stables, the other kitchens, stores and servants' rooms. It was to remain the family seat until the 20th century, when it was demolished.

Littleton now lived the life of a country gentleman, participating in county life to the full. He actively improved Teddesley Park, the area around his new home, creating gardens and hundreds of acres of grazing land beyond them. He did not seek to cultivate the land but developed his own strain of cattle to suit the conditions. He and his tenants also created an improved breed of sheep by crossing the hornless sheep of Cannock Chase with Ross rams.

In 1762-3 he was High Sheriff of Staffordshire, an onerous and expensive post that was not universally welcomed but reflected his standing. In 1781 his wife Frances died. They had no children and he never remarried.

== Political career ==
Littleton was returned unopposed, along with Sir John Wrottesley, 8th Baronet, as MP for Staffordshire on 8 April 1784. The seat was dominated at this time by the Leveson-Gower family of Trentham Hall. They were traditionally Whigs but Granville Leveson-Gower, 1st Marquess of Stafford had accepted posts in Tory ministries. By general agreement among the county landed gentry, one candidate should represent the Leveson Gower interest: this was Wrottesley, who had served in the American Revolutionary War, but returned home to oppose the running of it – essentially Gower's own position. The second seat was for a country member: a gentleman acceptable to the local landowning interest but essentially uncommitted to the party. This was Littleton. In fact, the Earl of Uxbridge had designs on the seat for his son, Lord Paget, who was still only 16 years old. By proposing Littleton, now in his late 50s, he hoped the seat might become vacant at the next election. In reality, Littleton survived for a further 28 years, holding his seat until his death. Wrottesley, however, died in 1787 and was replaced by Lord Gower, the Marquess's son. Gower was to remain an MP for Staffordshire until 1799, when his half-brother Lord Granville Leveson-Gower took over, holding the seat until 1815. Thus Littleton's colleagues at Westminster were much grander than himself for most of his political career, and in his last years he was largely overawed by them. Because of the tacit agreement about the distribution of seats, all Littleton's elections were uncontested.

The Staffordshire landowning establishment

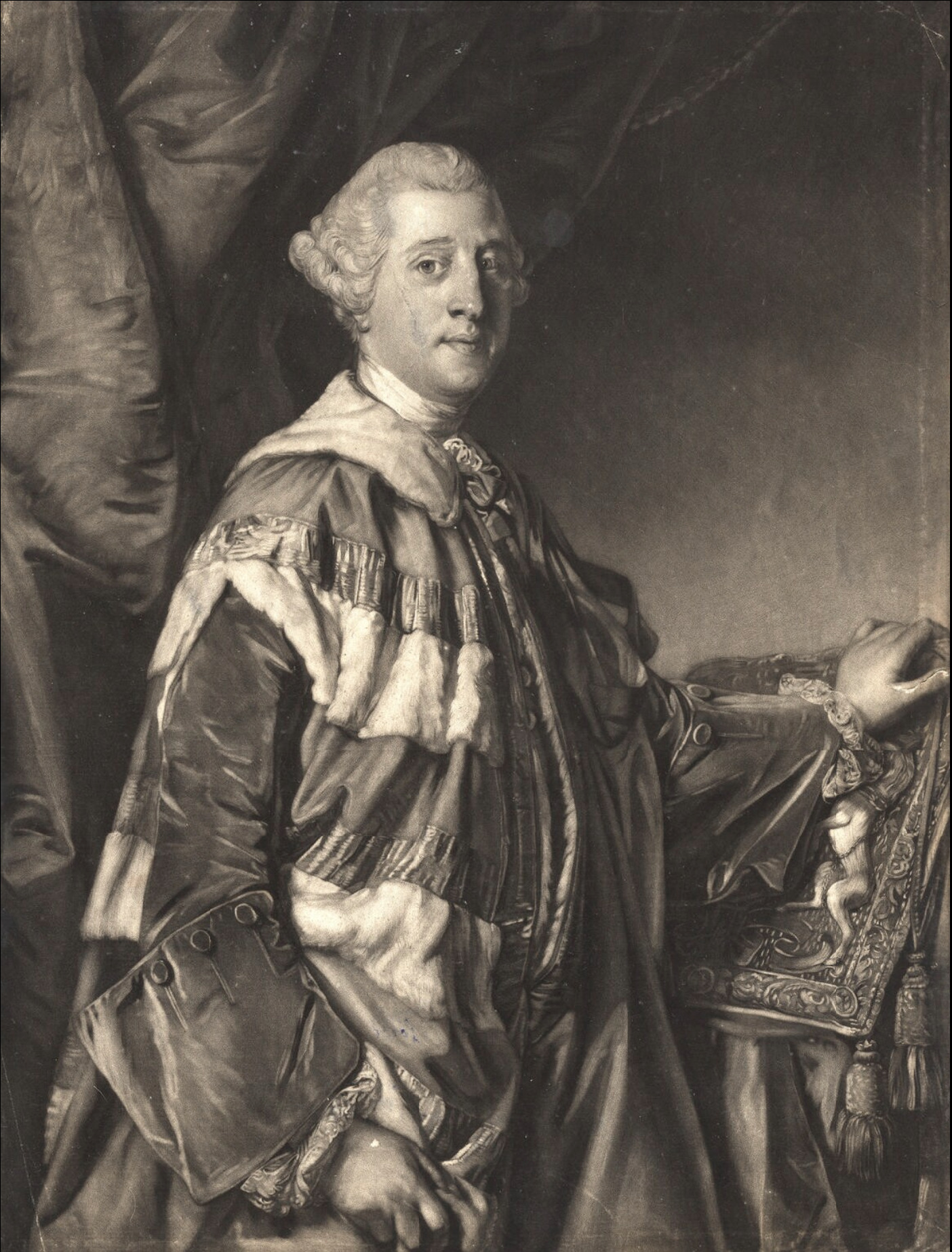
Granville Leveson-Gower, The Earl Gower (1721–1803) in 1784, later 1st Marquess of Stafford. Head of a traditionally Whig family based at Trentham Hall, he joined the Tory ministry of Frederick North, Lord North in the 1770s. His acquiescence was essential for Staffordshire MPs. He put in his nephew, Wrottesley, alongside Littleton.

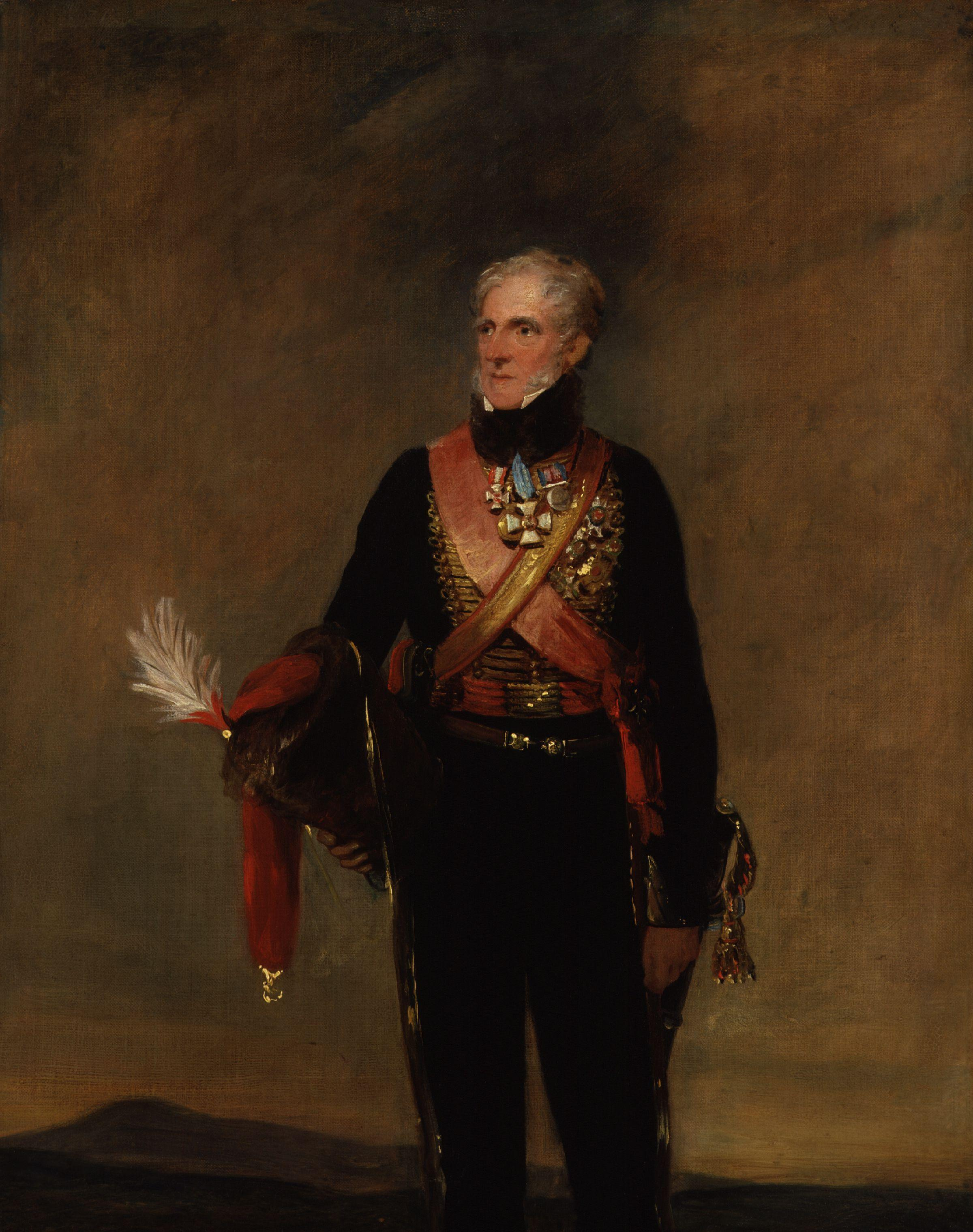
Henry William Paget, son of the Earl of Uxbridge. The Pagets were close neighbours of Littleton, with their Staffordshire seat at Beaudesert. Uxbridge approved Littleton's candidature, intending to keep the seat warm for Lord Paget. Littleton's longevity frustrated their plan, and Paget went on to win great fame as a soldier.

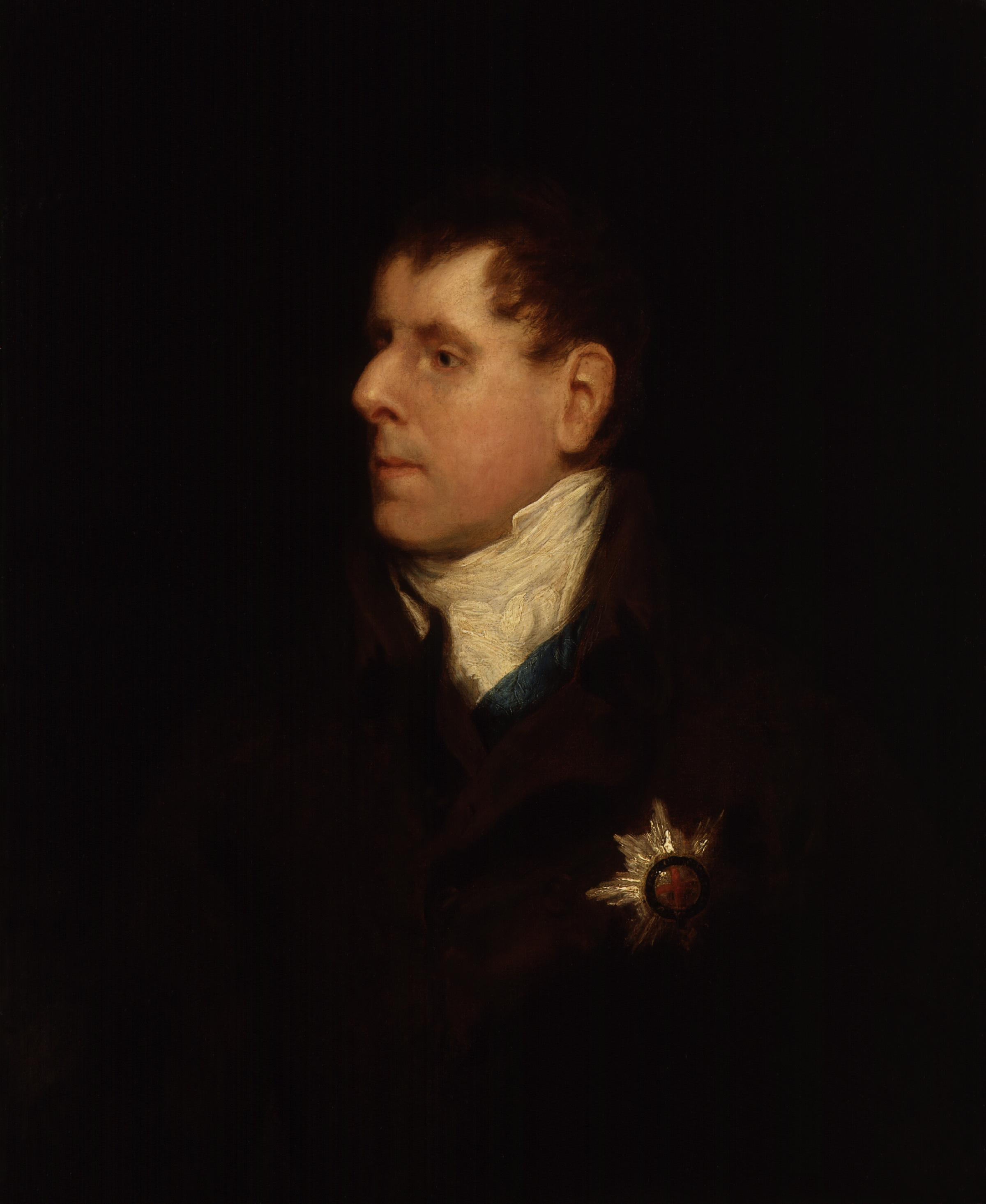
Lord Gower (1758–1833), Littleton's colleague as Staffordshire MP 1787–1799, pictured in later life as Duke of Sutherland. As the son of the 1st Marquess of Stafford, he was well-placed to interpret and police the family's interests. Later his role in the Highland Clearances was to be controversial.

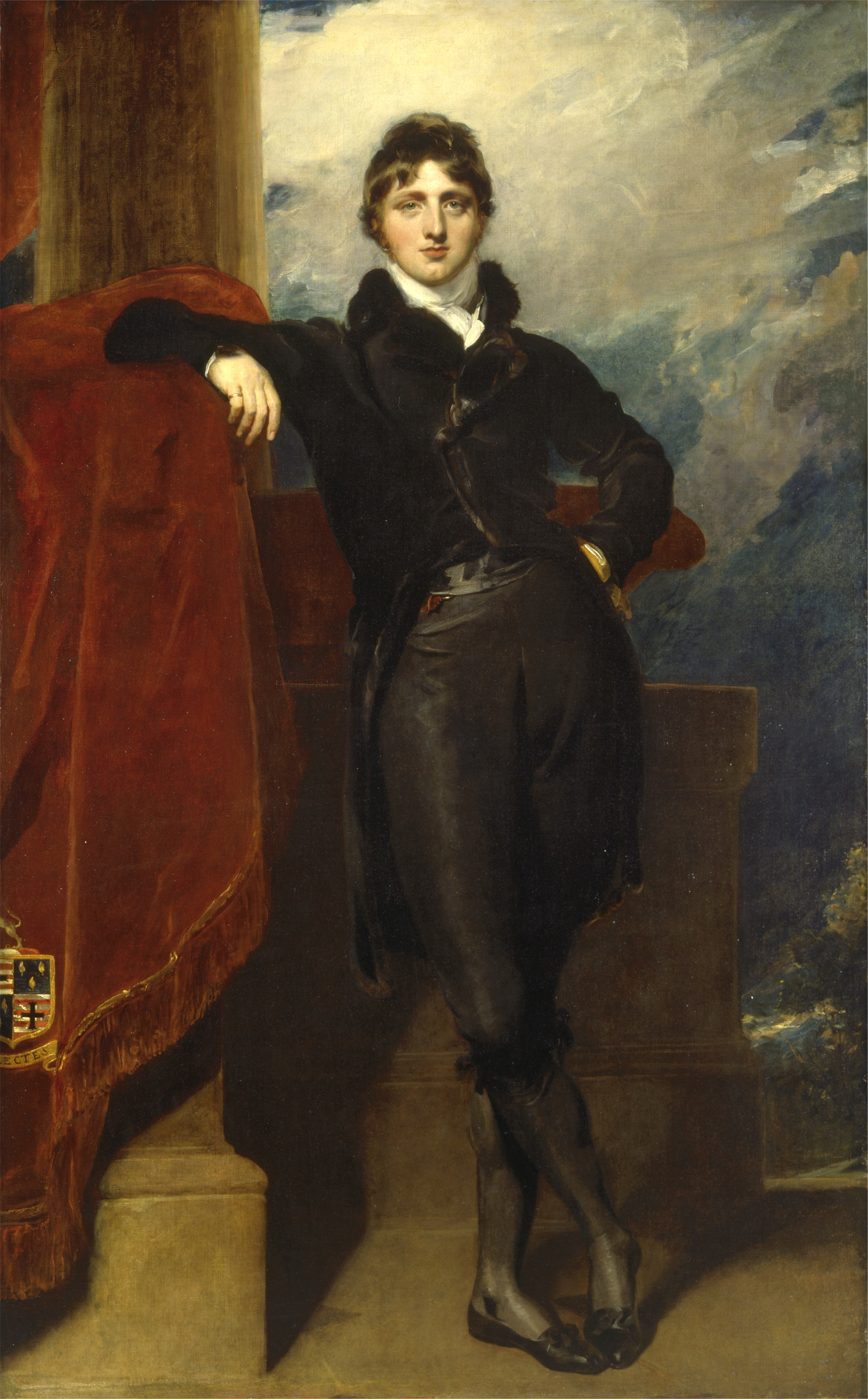
Lord Granville Leveson-Gower (1773–1846), Lord Gower's half-brother and Littleton's colleague as Staffordshire MP from 1799. He had considerably more liberal views and helped tip the family into opposition to William Pitt the Younger. Later he was to become a prominent Whig reformer.

Littleton was never a very active MP. He spoke only once in the House of Commons, shortly after he was first elected, against the brick tax. His party loyalties were vague. Often considered a Whig, he nevertheless voted most often with the Tory ministries that dominated the age, although this was not uncommon in times of war. With the collapse of the Rockingham Whigs, the Whig party in Parliament became fragmented and presented little opposition to the broadly Tory ministries of William Pitt the Younger. Littleton voted with Pitt's government on most issues. Whigs were distinguished at least as much by their support of the Prince of Wales against his father, George III, as with any specific cause. Littleton did not support the Prince and the Foxite Whigs in the Regency crisis of 1788 but he did vote for their proposal to settle the Prince's debts in 1795. In 1791 he opposed the repeal of the Test Act in Scotland, an early move towards civil rights for Roman Catholics, a cause that was to become an identifying mark of liberals in both Whig and Tory parties. On the other hand, in the very same year, he voted with the minority for abolition of the slave trade.

One problem faced by Littleton, very much a countryman, was his lack of metropolitan contacts and polish. In 1795, the cultivated, liberal Tory George Canning attended a dinner given by Littleton and wrote:

Poor Sir Ed, who is a quiz of the first magnitude, and who I believe had not given a dinner for twenty years before, was all bustle and anxiety during the whole of the entertainment. He informed us at the outset that he had been able to get but two bottles of champagne, and he seemed to take it much to heart when anybody showed a disposition to drink other wine in a much larger proportion.

In his later years, Littleton showed considerably more dissent from the ministerial position on key issues. This was probably because the Leveson Gowers were increasingly opposed to Pitt, while his colleague from 1799, Lord Granville Leveson-Gower was personally sympathetic to the Whigs. From 1801 to 1804, Pitt's place as prime minister was taken by Addington, introduced as a caretaker for Pitt, but on increasingly strained terms with his former friend. This gave Pitt's opponents in both parties an opportunity to undermine him. The Leveson Gowers induced Littleton to join the opposition to Pitt's Additional Forces Bill of 1803. The measure, to create a large Reserve Army, was highly controversial and its course through Parliament tortuous. Littleton voted with the minority against its final form on 11 June 1804. This was his last known vote. Thereafter he was considered a doubtful supporter of Tory ministries, but the Whigs too were doubtful of his support.

For much of the rest of his tenure of the Staffordshire seat, Littleton was either in default or on sick leave. He was considered still 'friendly' to the abolition of the slave trade in 1807, but was unable to vote for it. On his death in 1812, his nephew Edward Walhouse replaced him as MP, soon after changing his name to Littleton. He was a very different MP from the 4th Baronet: urbane, studious, a master of political detail and a determined debater, he first joined the Canningite Tories, but later became a Whig.

== Family ==
Littleton married Frances Horton in 1752. She died childless in 1781. As a result, there was no heir to the baronetcy, which therefore lapsed.

Littleton's sister, also called Frances, had married Moreton Walhouse, a member of a business dynasty with valuable investments in the Walsall area. Their grandson, Edward Walhouse was made heir to the Littleton estates, on condition that he change his name to Littleton, which he subsequently did. Heir to two fortunes, and thus a very rich man, he also became by far the most illustrious of the Littleton family politically, an important reformer and an active parliamentarian in both Houses for over fifty years, he served as Chief Secretary for Ireland in the 1830s.

== See also ==
- History of Penkridge

Baronetage of England
Preceded by Edward Littleton	Baronet (of Pillaton Hall); 1742–1812	Extinct
