= Sir Walter Bagot, 3rd Baronet =

English politician, barrister and landowner (1644-1704)

Sir Walter Bagot, 3rd Baronet (21 March 1644 – 15 February 1704), a barrister and landowner, succeeded to the title 3rd Baronet of Blithfield Hall, Staffordshire, on the death of his father Sir Edward Bagot in 1673.

He was educated at Christ Church, Oxford, and was called to the Middle Temple bar in 1666.

He served, like his father before him, as Member of Parliament for Staffordshire, England, from 1678 to 1695.

He married Jane Salesbury in June 1670 and had 5 sons and 5 daughters. He was succeeded by their son Edward Bagot. His daughter Elizabeth married Henry Paget, 1st Earl of Uxbridge, his daughter Jane married Morris Jones of Llanrhyadr, Denbighshire and later John Roberts, MP. His eldest daughter Mary (1672-1727) married Sir George Parker, 2nd Baronet in 1692.

Parliament of England
Preceded by Sir Edward Littleton; Randolph Egerton	Member of Parliament for Staffordshire; 1679–1690; With: Sir John Bowyer 1679–1685; Edward Littleton 1685–1689; John Grey 1689–1690	Succeeded by Walter Chetwynd; John Grey
Preceded by Walter Chetwynd; John Grey	Member of Parliament for Staffordshire; 1693–1695; With: John Grey	Succeeded by Henry Paget; John Grey
Baronetage of England
Preceded by Edward Bagot	Baronet (of Blithfield); 1673–1705	Succeeded by Edward Bagot
