= Sir Edward Littleton, 2nd Baronet =

Sir Edward Littleton of Pillaton Hall, 2nd Baronet (c. 1632–1709), was a Staffordshire landowner and MP from the extended Littleton/Lyttelton family, who represented Staffordshire in the Cavalier Parliament.

== Background and early life ==
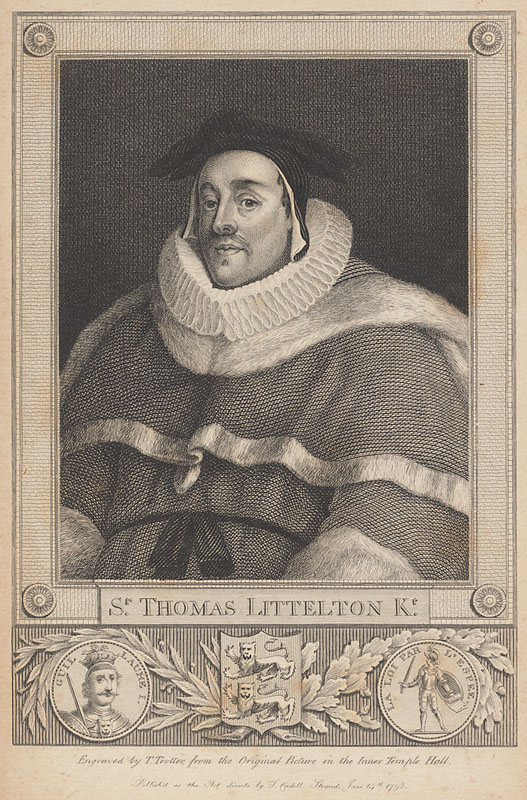
Sir Thomas de Littleton, ancestor of the Littleton families of Frankley, Penkridge and Stoke Milburgh. An 18th-century engraving after a 15th-century painting.

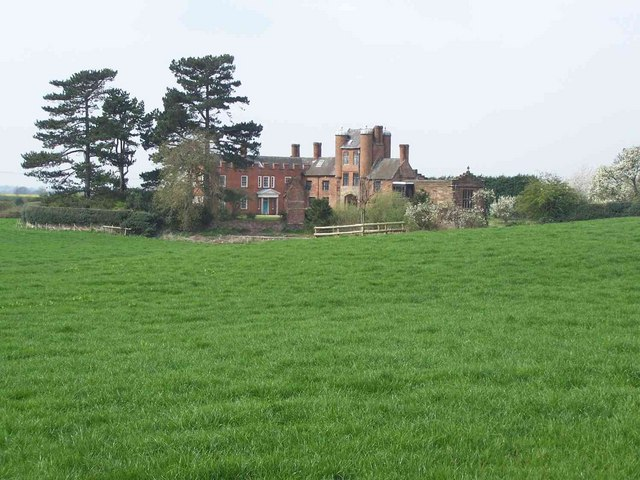
Remains of Pillaton Old Hall, near Penkridge, Staffordshire. The original moated manor house became ruinous after the family moved to Teddesley Hall in the mid-18th century, but the Gatehouse and Chapel were restored in the 1880s.

Littleton was descended from Thomas de Littleton, a noted 15th-century jurist. His family had had their seat at Pillaton Hall, near Penkridge, since 1529. They had built up substantial landholdings in the area from the mid-16th century, including large areas of Cannock Chase and the deanery manor of the dissolved collegiate church. His father was Sir Edward Littleton, 1st Baronet. His mother was Hester Courten, daughter of Sir William Courten, an immensely wealthy London textile merchant and financier, originally from Menen in Flanders. His birth date is generally given as circa 1632, although the birth of an Edward Littleton, son of Edward Littleton, is recorded by the Penkridge parish register for 22 January 1633, with the baptism on 5 February.

Littleton was educated at Shrewsbury School, which he entered in 1644. By this time his father had taken up the royalist side in the English Civil War. He was taken prisoner by the Parliamentary at Worcester in 1642 and his estates were sequestrated As he had large debts, Sir Edward was unable to come to an arrangement with the Committee for Compounding with Delinquents. The estates were purchased and saved for the Littletons by the family trustees: Richard Salway and Richard Knightley, a Northamptonshire cousin who was a moderate Parliamentarian and Presbyterian, and Fisher Littleton, a cousin who lived at Teddesley Lodge. The estates were back in family hands by 1654 but the first baronet probably died in 1657: certainly the second baronet had succeeded him in the title by August of that year, and it seems he had held the lands before that.

Presumably, Littleton had meanwhile acquired some form of legal training, as he was commissioner for oyer and terminer at Oxford shortly after the Restoration of Charles II in 1660.

== Landowner ==
In inheriting his father's title and estates, Littleton took on the traditional role of his family as pillars of the county, serving in a range of administrative, judicial and military posts. From July 1660 until March 1688 he served as a Staffordshire Justice of the Peace, and thereafter as Deputy Lieutenant. He served as a captain in the Volunteer Horse (precursor of the yeomanry). He was a commissioner for assessment, operating the taxation system locally, and for a time a commissioner for recusants. He was fairly undistinguished. A list of county landed gentry drawn up in 1662 describes him as "loyal, orthodox and sober, but of only ordinary parts." However, his lands were worth £1,500 a year.

In the 1690s the Littletons were forced to defend their rights in the manor formerly belonging to the college (canon law) of St. Michael, Penkridge. Littletons had leased the manor before the abolition of chantries swept away the college in 1547. In 1585 Edward Littleton (died 1610) bought the college, with all its lands and rights. This included the peculiar jurisdiction of the college. Although St Michael's became the centre of a large Anglican parish, it was still not absorbed into the Diocese of Lichfield. The Littletons, as lords of the manor, assumed the role of chief official of the peculiar. For over three hundred years before the dissolution of the college, its dean had been the current Archbishop of Dublin. In 1661 Archbishop James Margetson carried out a canonical visitation – something to which he no right as his predecessors had never been ordinary of the church: rather they had acted as agents of the Crown.

In the 1690s things went a large step further when the diocese of Lichfield and Coventry requested permission to carry out a visitation on behalf of Archbishop Narcissus Marsh. Marsh granted a process to carry out a visitation of Penkridge to Bishop William Lloyd. The process was delivered to the churchwardens of St. Michael's, who immediately involved the Littletons, although it appears that the baronet's son Edward dealt with matters on the spot. Clearly forearmed after his previous experience, Edward Littleton wrote in reply to the bishop. William Walmesley, chancellor of the diocese, came to Penkridge to look at the relevant documents and convinced himself that the Archbishop of Dublin had no right of visitation and, consequently, no right to delegate it to anyone else. Bishop Lloyd then called on Littleton to confirm this and had dinner with him. No more was heard of the matter. The Littletons continued to appoint the vicar and to keep the bishop at bay until the peculiar jurisdiction was abolished in 1858.

== Political career ==
The Cavalier Parliament, the first English parliament summoned by Charles II, lasted for most of his reign, from 8 May 1661 to 24 January 1679. Littleton was not initially elected to represent Staffordshire: the county's MPs were Sir Thomas Leigh and Randolph Egerton. However, Leigh died on 5 April 1662 and a writ for fresh election was issued two weeks later. Sir Walter Wrottesley, Littleton's brother-in-law, was the preferred candidate of many of the local gentry and a letter from Lord Brooke written to Clarendon, the Lord Chancellor in November stated that Littleton was agreed on 'after much trouble'. He reminded Clarendon that Littleton would be ineligible as MP if appointed sheriff, an unpopular post for which he was presumably being considered. Clarendon accepted this but the election was held only on 3 March 1663. Littleton was returned unopposed, although the county had been represented by only one member for nearly a year.

Littleton seems to have been a lethargic MP. He served mainly on the committee of elections and privileges. In his first session, he helped with legislation to aid Cavalier officers impoverished by their service. He was also involved in an investigation into loyal and indigent officers and conducted the inquiry into the conduct of Sir Richard Temple, who was accused of a breach of Parliamentary privilege in offering his services directly to Charles II in a plot to subvert Clarendon. The following year he helped handle a petition from navy creditors.

Littleton's last appearance in a committee was late in 1670. After this he retired to the Moat House, Tamworth with his second wife, leaving his 17-year-old, newly married son to occupy Pillaton Hall. In 1678 he was imprisoned briefly for failing to attend parliament. He seems to have opposed the succession of James II. He was removed from the lieutenancy and the commission of the peace, and his son, also Edward Littleton represented the county in James II's Loyal Parliament. He welcomed the Glorious Revolution and was rewarded with the honorary post of Gentleman of the Privy Chamber to William III in 1692, holding it until the end of the reign in 1702.

== Death ==
Littleton's son and heir, Edward, a horseracing enthusiast but an unenthusiastic MP like his father, died in 1706, predeceasing his father, after a notable career as an administrator in India. However, this Edward had a son, also Edward. This grandson of the baronet was thus destined to become Sir Edward Littleton, 3rd Baronet.

The 2nd Baronet died in 1709 and was buried at Tamworth on 31 July.

== Marriages and family ==
Littleton married twice:

About 1650 he married Mary Wrottesley, daughter of Sir Walter Wrottesley of Wrottesley, 1st Baronet. She died in 1665. They had 6 children:

- Mary Littleton (married Henry Gough, Knt in 1668)
- Edward Littleton – heir to the estates and title, died 1706, father of Sir Edward Littleton, 3rd Baronet.
- Catherine Littleton
- Elizabeth Littleton
- Major Walter Littleton killed in a dual “with Captain Adderley as a direct result of the fiasco outside Axminster” (Captain Charles Adderley, a protestant officer of the Royal Horse Guards, cut down his catholic major, Walter Littleton, in a duel in the streets of London on 19 December 1688.) m. Lady Anna Maria Knowles, dau of Nicholas Knowles, 3rd earl of Banbury. This marriage produced a daughter, Anne, who died unmarried aged 18 Lady Anna Maria married secondly Capt Philip Lawson killed in a dual on 6 October 1692 (sixth son of Sir John Lawson Bt of Brough in Yorkshire), and thirdly Col (Robert?.) Harvey of Leicestershire
- Esther Littleton.

About 1674 he married a cousin, Joyce Littleton, daughter of Edward Littleton of Shuston, Church Eaton, who was about 20 years his junior. Neither cousin marriage nor inter-generational marriage was unusual among 17th-century gentry. However, there seems to have been some whiff of scandal and it was rumoured that their first three children were illegitimate. This may be connected with their move to Tamworth, leaving the heir, Edward, to occupy the family estates. In all, they had 13 children:

- Mary Littleton
- Devereux Littleton
- Thomas Littleton
- Fisher Littleton – father of Sir Edward Littleton, 4th Baronet
- William Littleton
- Adam Littleton
- Jane Littleton
- Joyce Littleton
- Charles Littleton
- Edward Littleton
- Catherine Littleton
- Adam Littleton
- Sarah Littleton

== See also ==
- Littleton baronets

Baronetage of England
Preceded by Edward Littleton	Baronet (of Pillaton Hall) c. 1657–1709	Succeeded by Edward Littleton
