= Sir Edward Bagot, 4th Baronet =

Sir Edward Bagot, 4th Baronet (21 January 1674 – May 1712) succeeded to the Baronetcy of Blithfield Hall, Staffordshire, on the death of his father Sir Walter Bagot in 1704.

He was educated at Christ Church, Oxford. He matriculated in 1691 and was admitted to the Middle Temple in 1692.

He served, like his father, as member of parliament for Staffordshire 1698–1708.

He married Frances Wagstaffe, daughter of Sir Thomas Wagstaffe, in 1697 and he was succeeded by his only son Walter.

== See also ==
- Baron Bagot

Parliament of England
Preceded by John Grey; Henry Paget	Member of Parliament for Staffordshire; 1698–1707; With: Henry Paget	Succeeded by Parliament of Great Britain
Parliament of Great Britain
Preceded by Parliament of England	Member of Parliament for Staffordshire; 1707–1708; With: Henry Paget	Succeeded by Henry Paget; John Wrottesley
Baronetage of England
Preceded by Walter Bagot	Baronet (of Blithfield Hall); 1704–1712	Succeeded by Walter Bagot
