= Littleton baronets =

Extinct baronetcy in the Baronetage of England

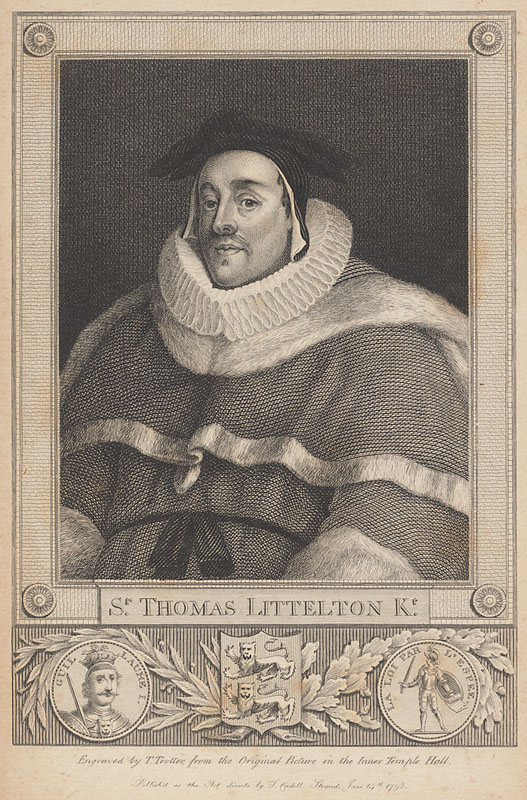
Sir Thomas de Littleton, ancestor of the Littleton families of Frankley, Penkridge and Stoke Milburgh. An 18th-century engraving after a 15th-century painting.

Three baronetcies have been created in the Baronetage of England for members of the Littleton or Lyttelton family. All three lines are descended from Thomas de Littleton, a noted 15th-century jurist. Despite differences in the spelling of the title, the names of all three lines were spelt in many varied ways in the early modern period, without distinction between the different branches of the family. This can be confusing, as the range of forenames in use was very limited.

== Origins ==
The Littleton family had its origins in South Lyttleton, near Evesham, Worcestershire. With the marriage of the heiress Elizabeth Littleton to Thomas Westcote, esquire, two of Elizabeth's sons, Sir Thomas and Edmund, took the surname Lyttleton or Littleton while two others, Nicholas and Guy, retained the earlier surname; Nicholas Westcote married Agnes Vernon, the daughter and heiress of Edmund Vernon, and was an ancestor of the Westcotes of Staffordshire, while Guy married the daughter of one Greenevill of Gloucestershire, and was an ancestor of the Westcotes of Devon and Somerset. Edmund Littleton died unmarried. Thomas de Littleton became 'one of the great law luminaries of his country, and is immortalized by one work alone, his celebrated Treatise on Tenures. He was appointed a judge of the Court of Common Pleas in 1464, and was created a Knight of the Bath in 1475. He inherited the Frankley estates from his mother. He married Joan Burley, a wealthy heiress, who was the widow of Philip Chetwynd V of Ingestre, Staffordshire. They had three sons, William, Richard and Thomas, from whom originated three lines of landed gentry in the West Midlands, all of which acquired baronetcies in the 17th century.

== The Lyttelton baronets of Frankley ==
The greater part of the wealth of Thomas and Joan passed to their eldest son, Sir William Littleton of Frankley, Worcestershire. The Frankley line acquired a baronetcy on 25 June 1618. With the fifth baronet, the title was subsumed into that of Baron Lyttelton.

== The Littletons of Pillaton Hall ==
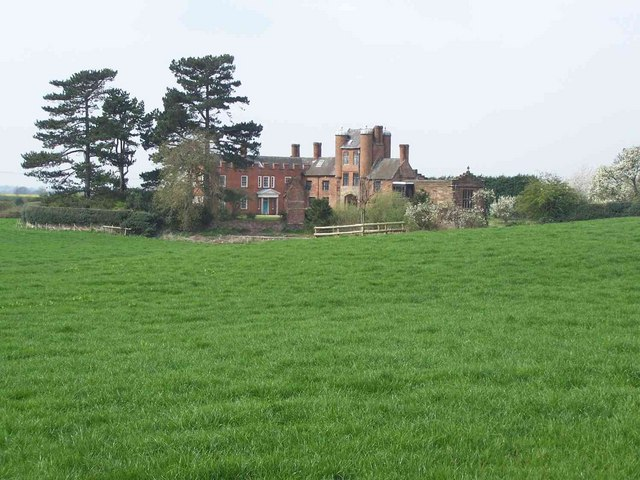
Remains of Pillaton Old Hall, near Penkridge, Staffordshire. The original moated manor house became ruinous, but the Gatehouse and Chapel were restored in the 1880s.

Richard married Alice Winesbury or Wynnesbury, heiress of Pillaton Hall, near Penkridge, in Staffordshire. Their eldest son, Edward, inherited Alice's lands and was vigorous in acquiring lands on Cannock Chase as it was finally deforested. He was appointed Constable of Stafford Castle for life and was High Sheriff of Staffordshire on three occasions. He was the first of the line to be knighted. All subsequent Pillaton heirs were named Edward.

The Baronetcy of Littleton of Pillaton Hall was created for Edward Littleton, of Pillaton Hall, on 28 June 1627. The Baronetcy became extinct in 1812 on the death of the 4th Baronet, who had moved the seat of the family to Teddesley Hall and whose heir was a nephew, Edward John Walhouse. The latter adopted the Littleton name and inherited both the Littleton lands and the Walhouse lands and investments. A prominent politician, he became Edward Littleton, 1st Baron Hatherton.

=== Ancestors ===
- Thomas de Littleton (died 1481)
- Richard Littleton
- Sir Edward Littleton (died 1558)- MP for Staffordshire in five parliaments
- Sir Edward Littleton (died 1574) - sheriff of Staffordshire 1563
- Sir Edward Littleton (died 1610) - MP for Staffordshire 1604–10
- Sir Edward Littleton (died 1629) - MP for Staffordshire 1624

=== Baronets ===
- Sir Edward Littleton, 1st Baronet (c. 1599 – c. 1657)
- Sir Edward Littleton, 2nd Baronet (c. 1632–1709)
- Sir Edward Littleton, 3rd Baronet (died 1742)
- Sir Edward Littleton, 4th Baronet (1727–1812)
Monuments to the Littletons of Pillaton Hall in Penkridge parish church

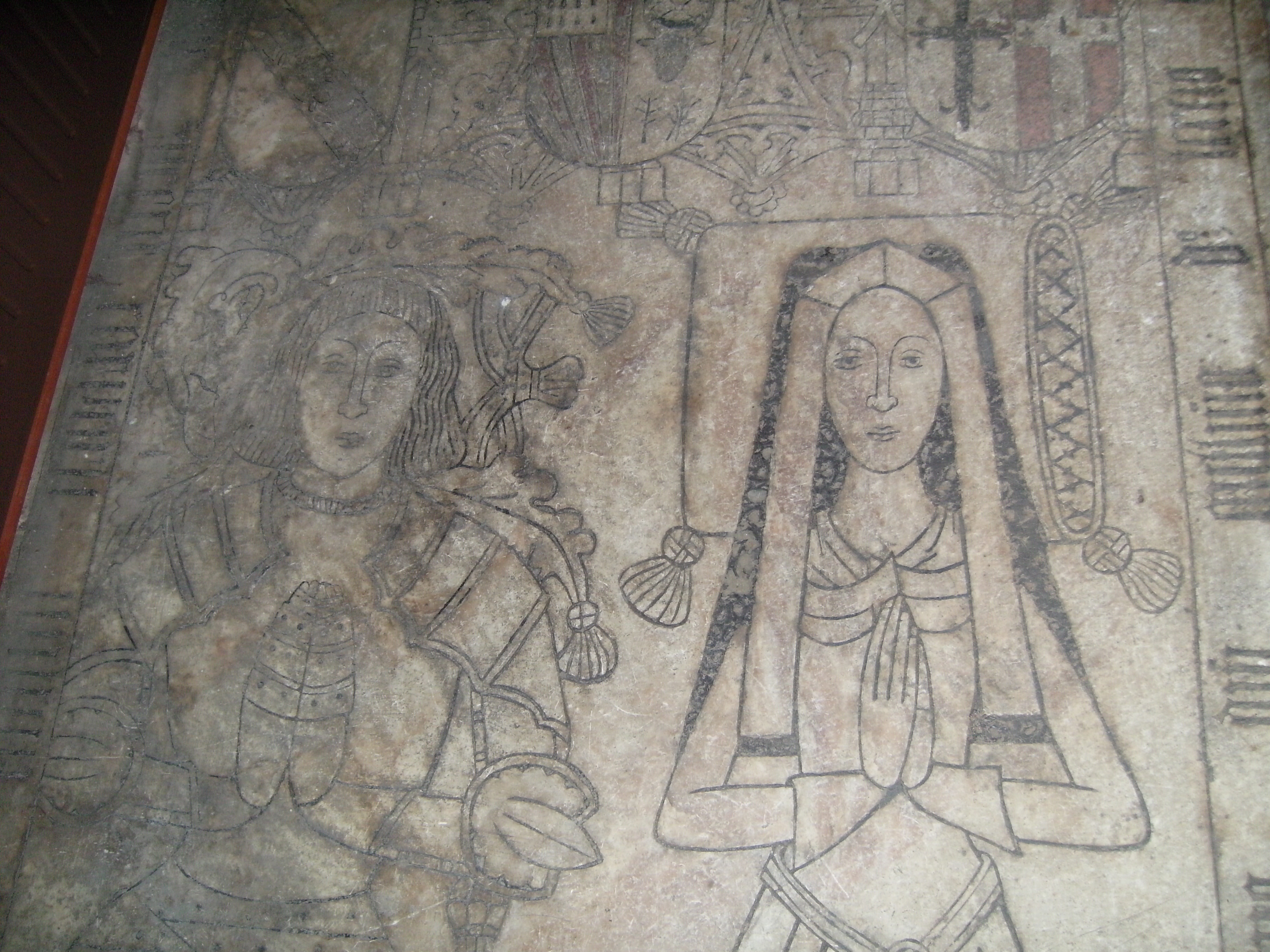
William Wynnesbury of Pillaton Hall and his wife. From their memorial, in the floor of the south chancel aisle, St. Michael's church. Their daughter, Alice, conveyed their estate to the Littletons of Pillaton Hall, the foundation of their fortune.

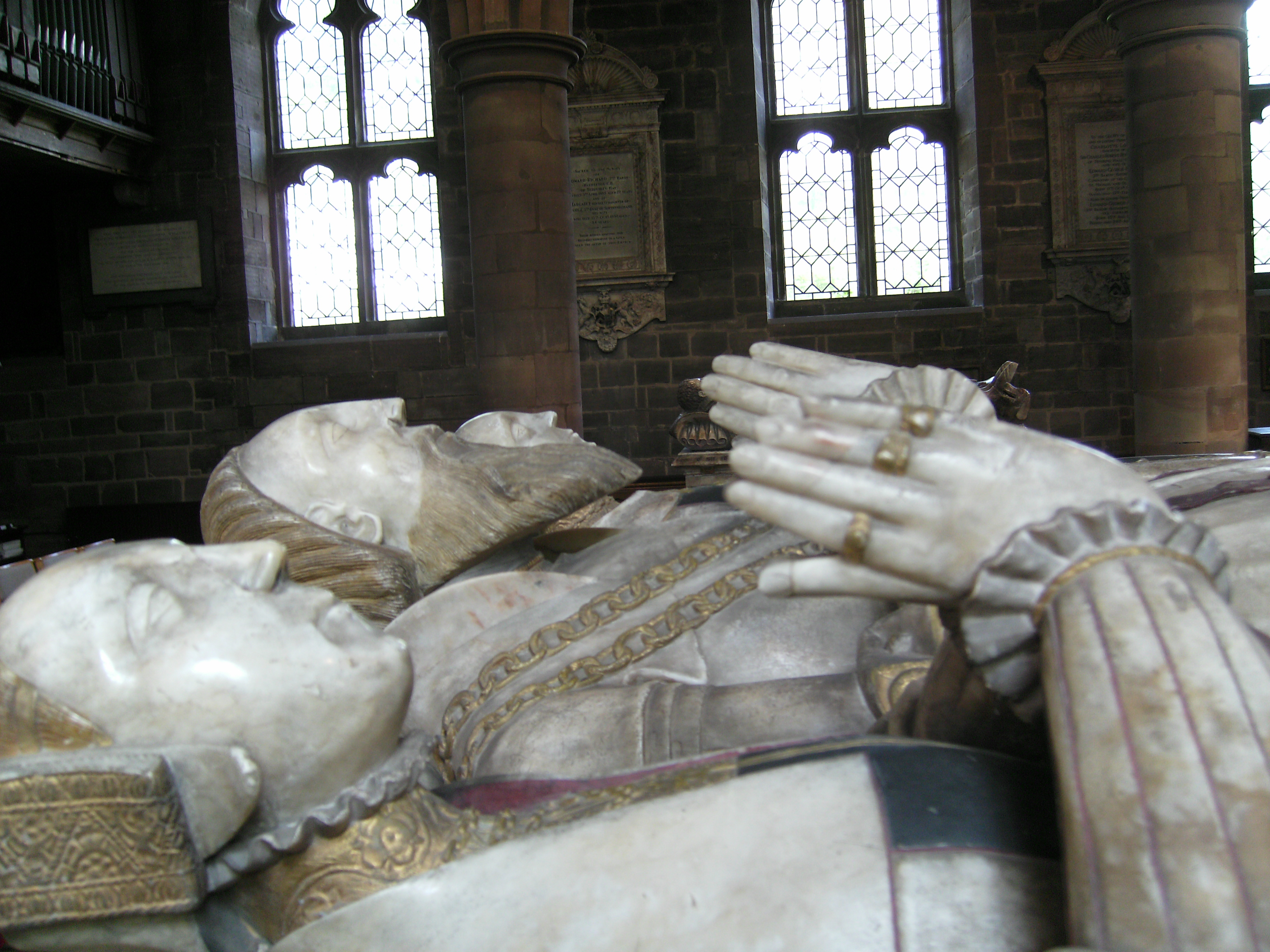
Tomb of Sir Edward Littleton (died 1558) and his wives, Helen Swynnerton and Isabel Wood. Attributed to the Royley workshop in Burton on Trent.

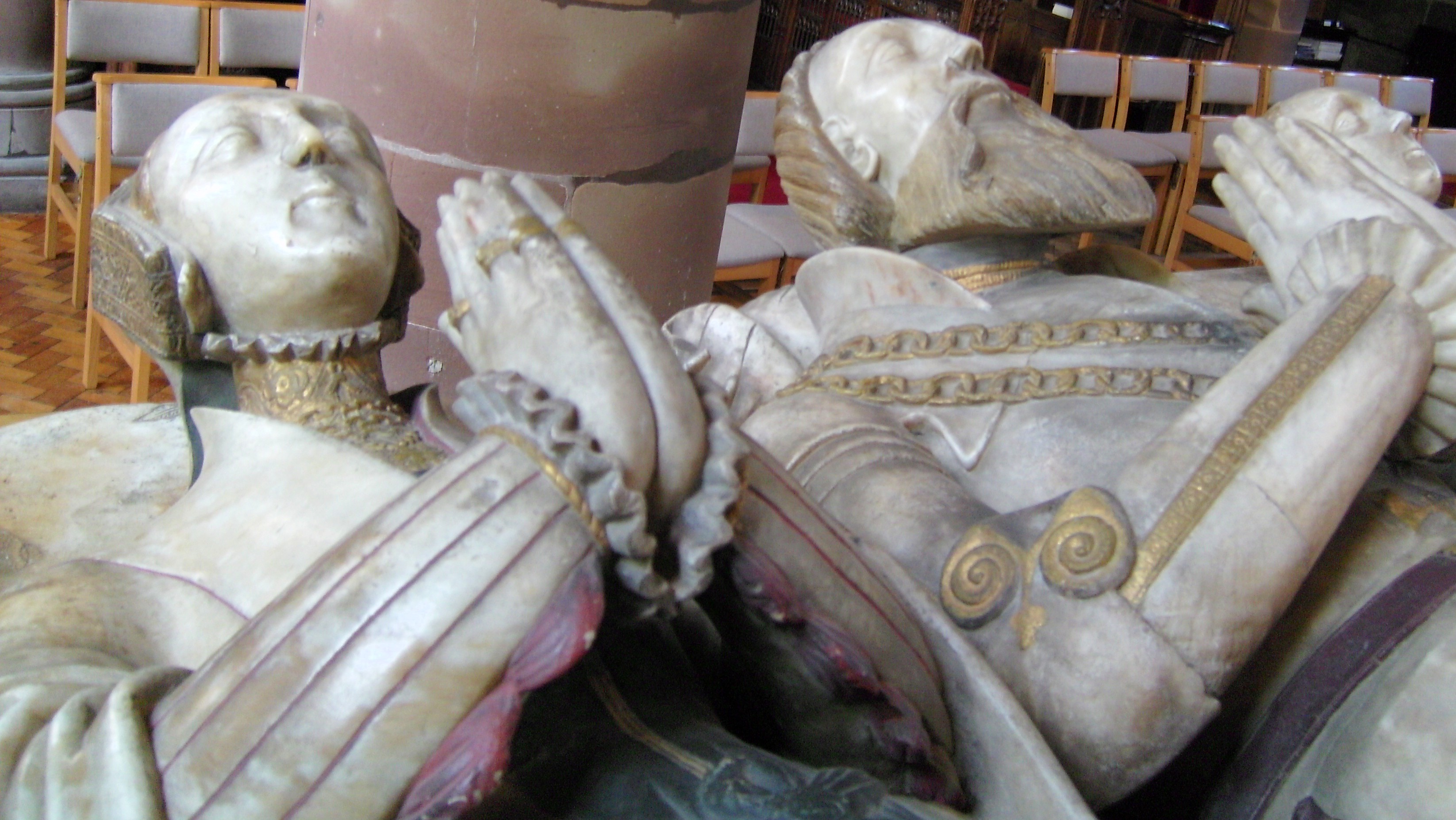
Helen Swynnerton's gable hood clearly places her in an earlier, pre-Reformation, age.

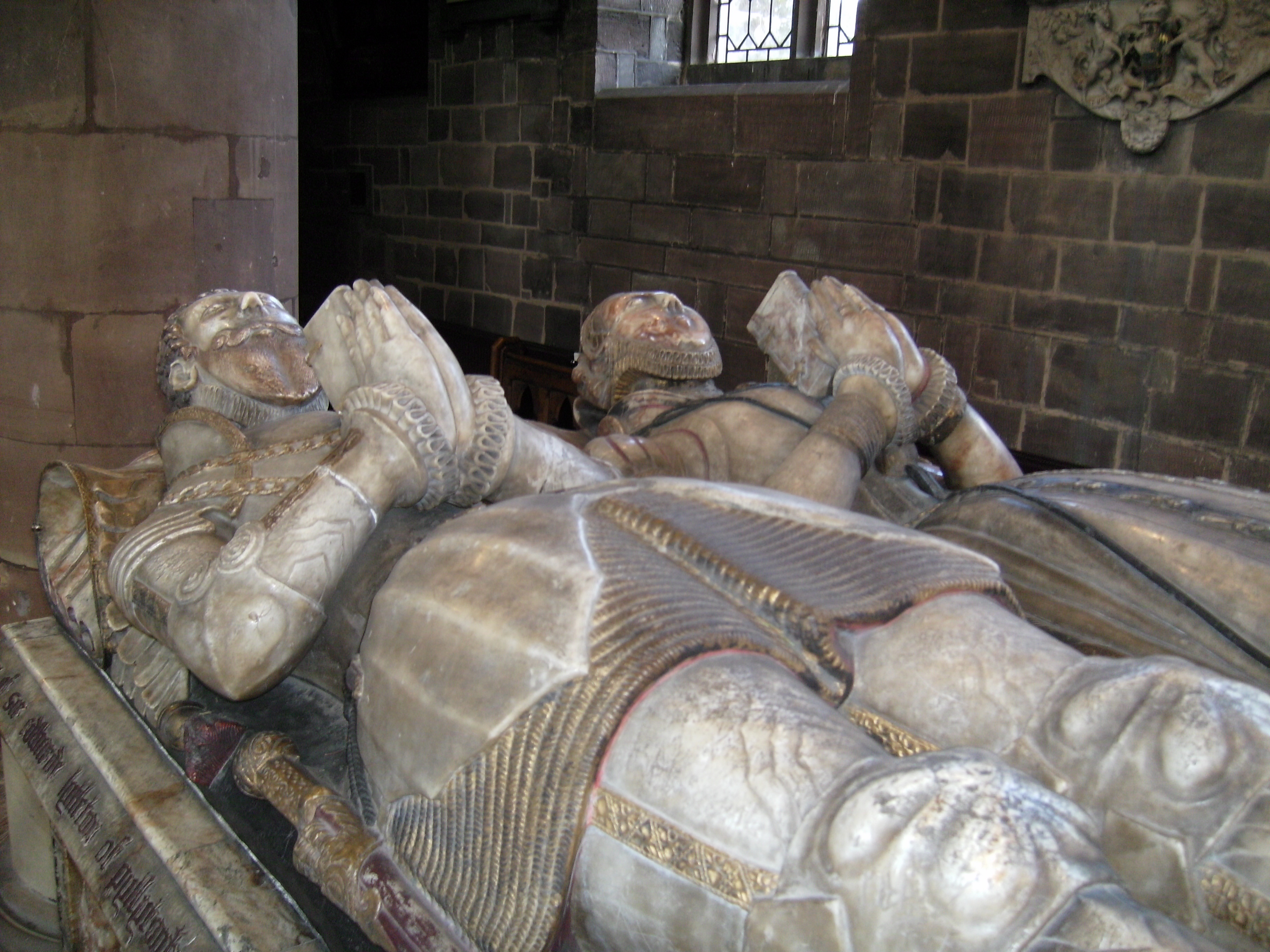
Tomb of Sir Edward Littleton (died 1574) and his wife, Alice Cockayne. The high ruffs for both are characteristic of the period. Attributed to the Royley workshop in Burton on Trent.

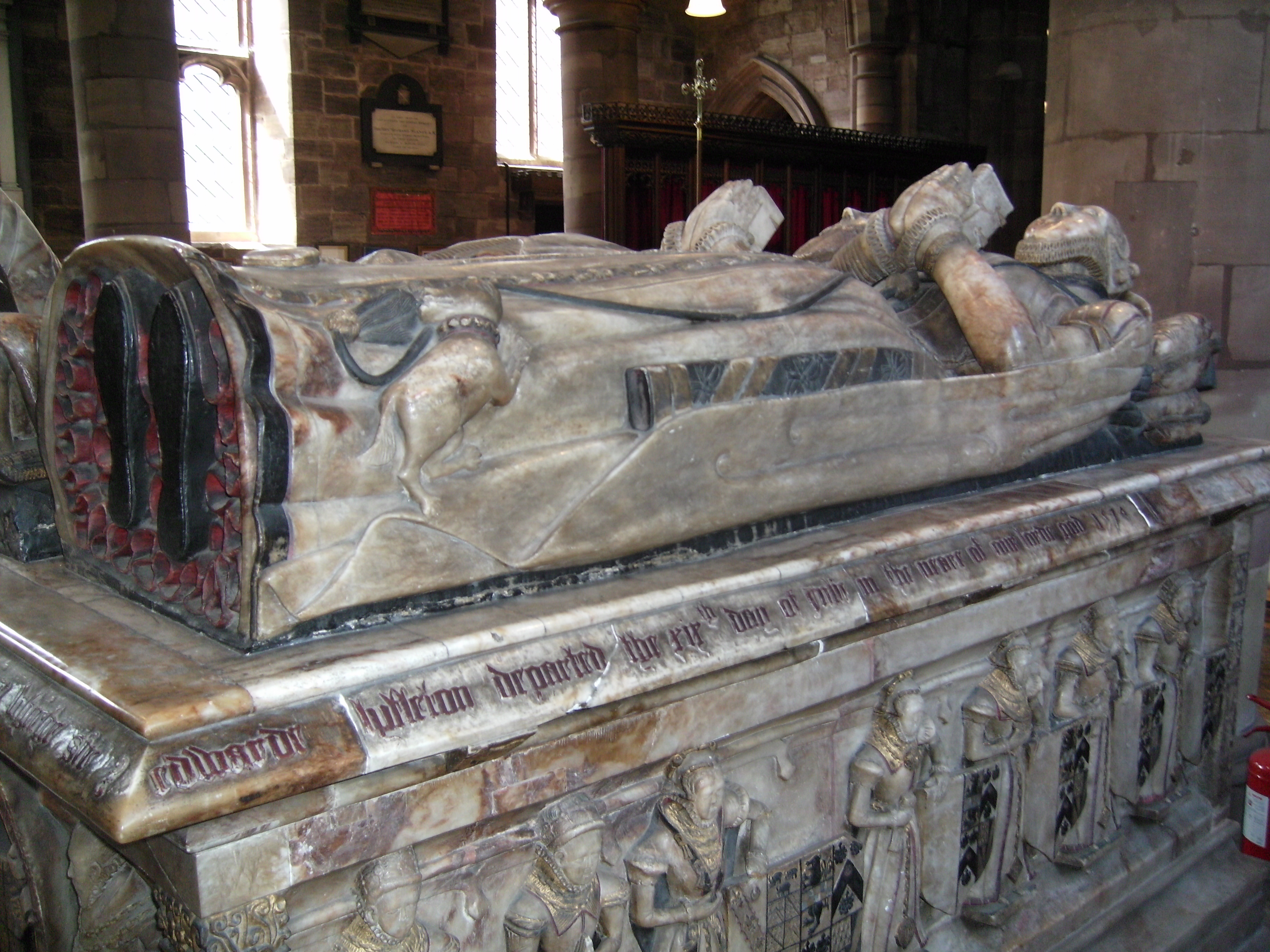
Alice Cockayne. The Royleys once again show intricate details of dress and fashion, while the modelling of faces is highly stereotypical.

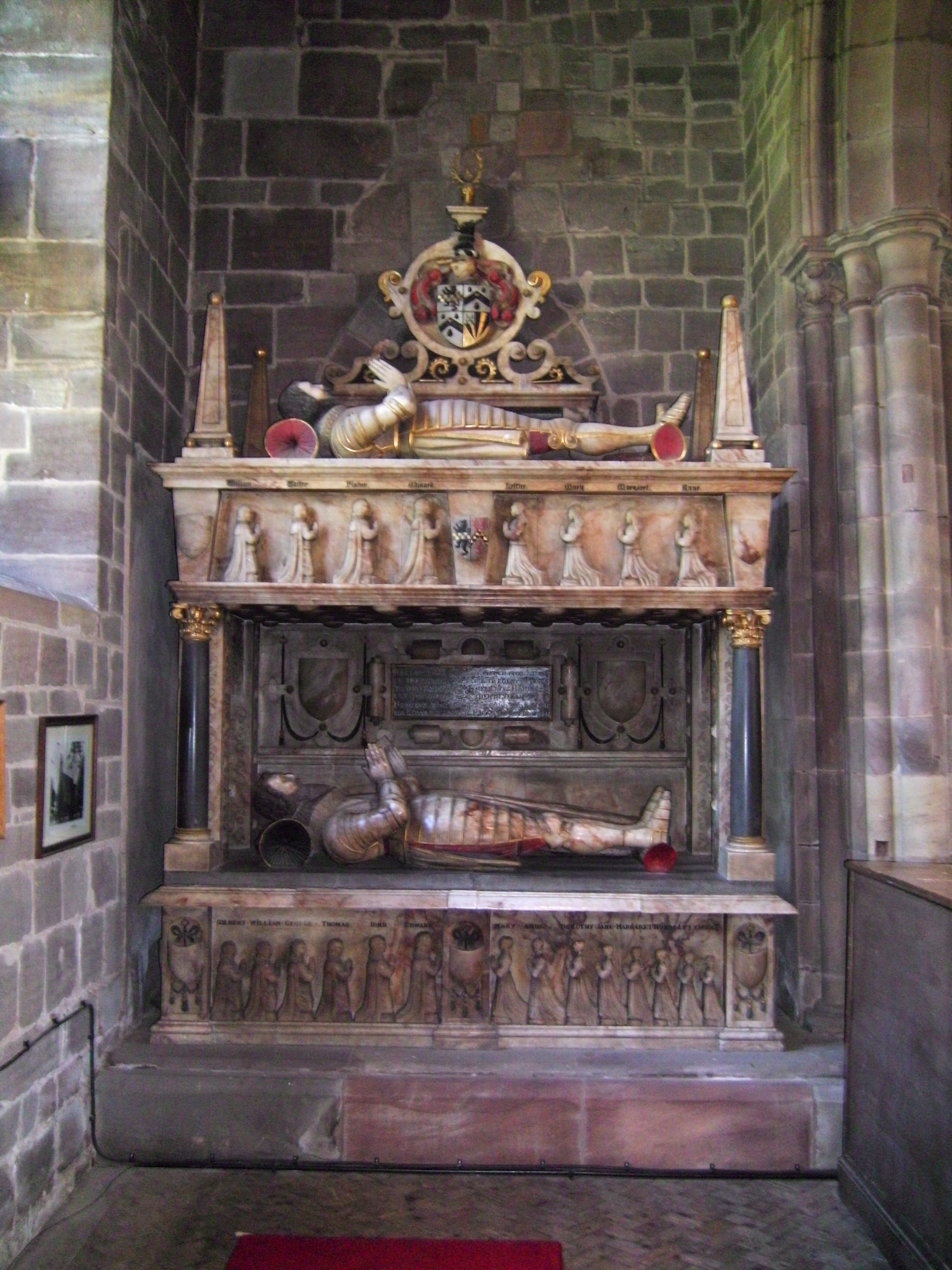
Tomb of two Sir Edward Littletons, father and son. East wall of north chancel aisle. Lower stage: Sir Edward Littleton (died 1610) and his wife Margaret Devereux. Upper stage: Sir Edward (died 1629), and his wife Mary Fisher. Their son, also Sir Edward, became the first baronet in 1627.

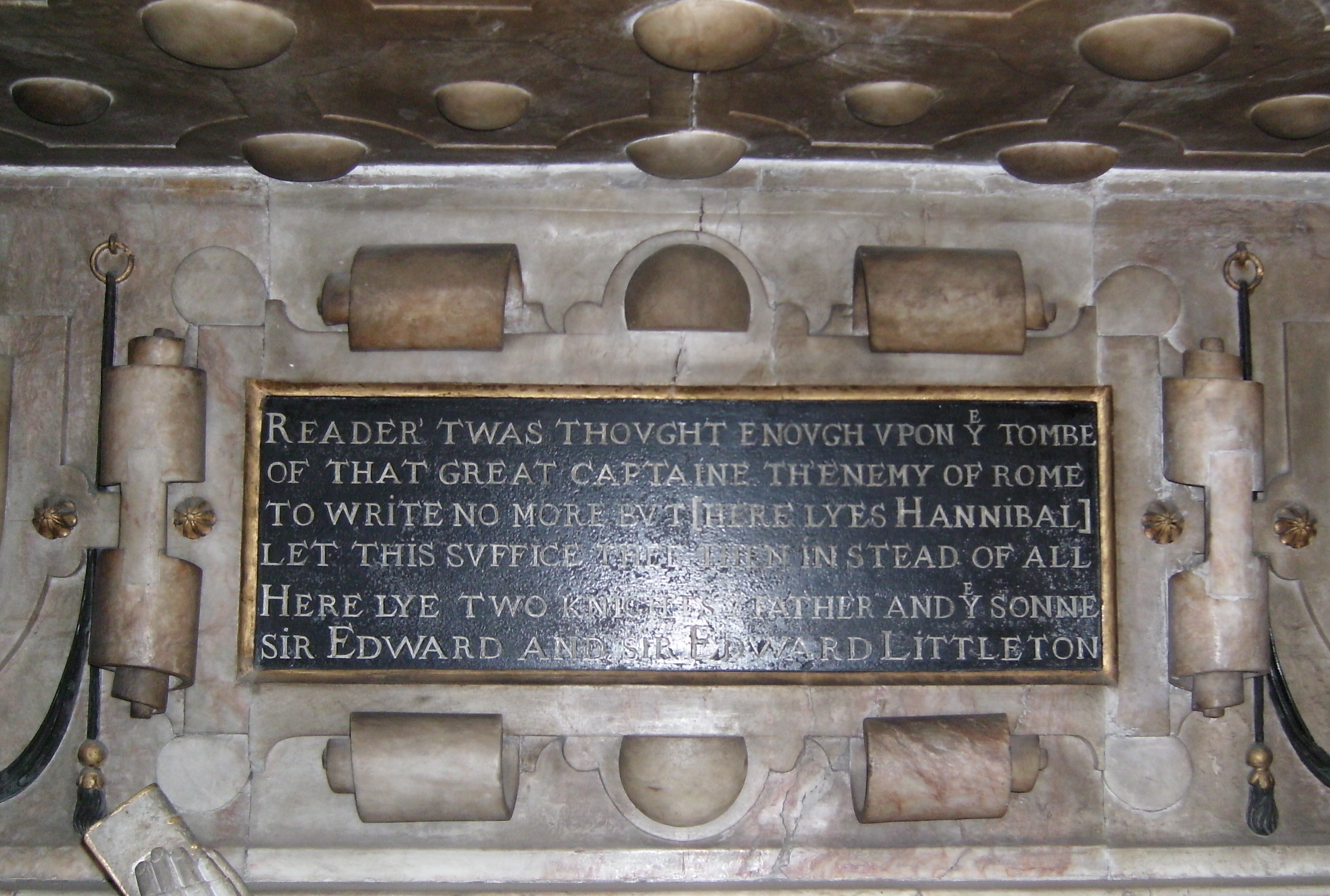
Inscription on the double tomb. Although the import of the inscription is that their reputation is self-evident, it just manages to convey a hint of anti-Catholicism.

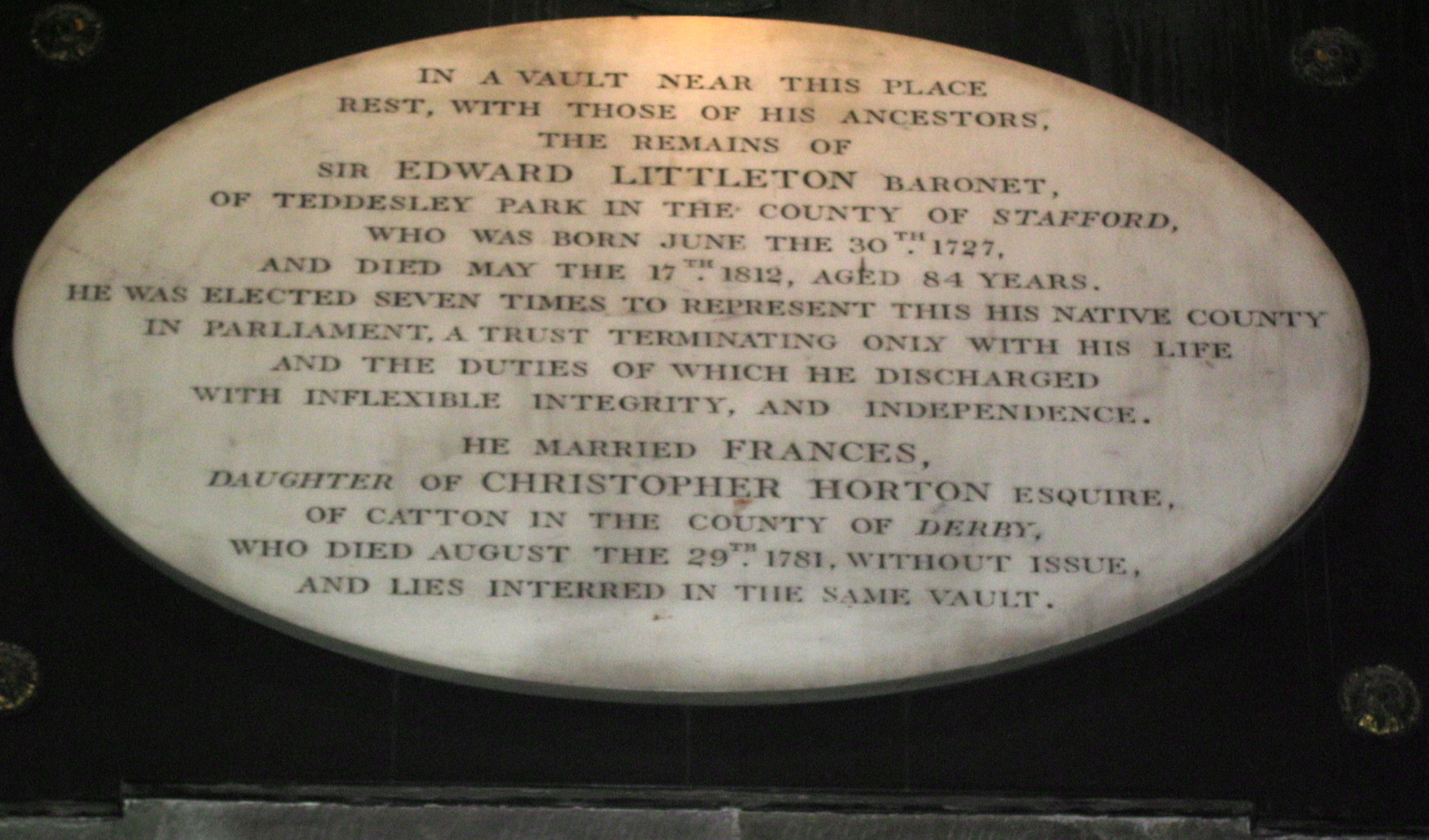
Memorial to Sir Edward Littleton, the 4th and last baronet, who moved the family seat to Teddesley Hall. He died without issue in 1812, leaving the estates to his great-nephew, Edward Walhouse, who became Edward Littleton, 1st Baron Hatherton.

== The Littletons of Stoke Milburgh ==
The Baronetcy of Littleton of Stoke Milburgh was created on 14 October 1642 for Adam Littleton. He was a descendant of Thomas Litleton of Speechly, Worcestershire, third son of Thomas de Lyttleton. this baronetcy became extinct upon the death of Sir Thomas Littleton, sometime Speaker of the House of Commons, in 1709.

=== Littleton baronets, of Stoke Milburgh, Shropshire (1642) ===
- Sir Adam Littleton, 1st Baronet (died 1647)
- Sir Thomas Littleton, 2nd Baronet (c. 1621–1681)
- Sir Thomas Littleton, 3rd Baronet (1647–1709)

== See also ==
- Lyttelton family

== Notes ==
Baronetage of England
Preceded by Boynton baronets	Littleton baronets 25 June 1618	Succeeded by Leigh baronets
