= Thomas de Littleton =

English judge (c. 1407–1481)

Sir Thomas de Littleton KB SL
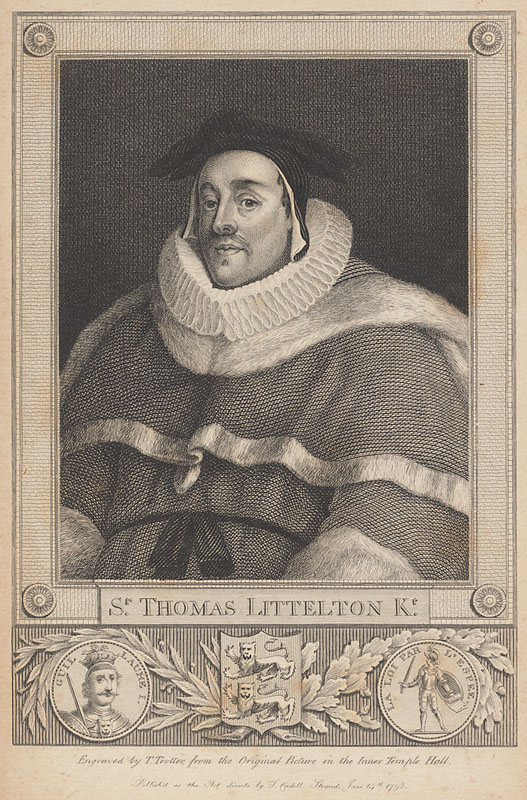
- Sir Thomas Littleton
- Born: 1407
- Died: 23 August 1481 (aged 73–74)
- Buried: Worcester Cathedral
- Noble family: Lyttleton
- Spouse: Joan Burley
- Issue: Sir William Littleton; Richard Littleton; Thomas Littleton; Ellen Littleton; Alice Littleton
- Father: Thomas Westcote or Heuster alias Littleton
- Mother: Elizabeth Littleton
- Occupation: Judge, Writer, Undersheriff, Knight

Arms of Sir Thomas de Lyttleton (Lyttleton impaling Burley alias Mylde), St Michael's Church, Munslow, Shropshire

Sir Thomas de Littleton KB SL (or de Lyttleton; c. 1407–23 August 1481) was an English judge, undersheriff, Lord of Tixall Manor, and legal writer from the Lyttelton family. He was also made a Knight of the Bath by King Edward IV.

== Family background ==
Thomas de Littleton was the eldest son of Elizabeth Littleton (sole daughter and heiress of Thomas de Littleton, Lord of Frankley, Worcestershire) and of Thomas Westcote or Heuster, esquire, chief prothonotary of the Court of Common Pleas. The date of Littleton's birth is uncertain; a MS. pedigree gives 1422, but it probably occurred earlier than this. If, as is generally accepted, he was born at Frankley Manor, it could not have been before 1407, in which year Littleton's grandfather recovered the manor from a distant branch of the family.

Elizabeth Littleton and Thomas Westcote had four sons. Thomas, the eldest son and heir, took his mother's surname – likely as a condition of her marriage-settlement as heir to the manor of Frankley. Two of his brothers, Nicholas and Guy, retained the surname Westcote. Nicholas Westcote married Agnes Vernon, the daughter and heiress of Edmund Vernon, and was an ancestor of the Westcotes of Staffordshire, while Guy Westcote married the daughter of one Greenevill of Gloucestershire and was an ancestor of the Westcotes of Devon and Somerset.

== Career ==
He attended the grammar school attached to the monastery in Worcester. Thus, he is cherished as an alumnus by both descendant educational institutions, today's Royal Grammar School Worcester and The King's School Worcester. He is said by Sir Edward Coke to have "attended one of the universities," but there is no corroboration of this statement.

He was probably a member of the Inner Temple and lectured there on the statute of Westminster, i.e., Donis Conditionalibus. His name appears in the Paston Letters (ed. J. Gairdner, p. 60) about 1445 as that of a well-known counsel, and in 1481/2 he received a grant of the manor of Sheriff Hales, Shropshire, from Sir William Trussell as a reward for his services as counsel.

Sometime before 1468, he purchased Tixall Manor from John Merston, who married an heiress of the De Wasteney family who had previously owned the manor. After Littleton's death, his granddaughter Joan inherited the manor. She married Sir John Aston of Haywood, and the manor would remain in the hands of the Aston family for many generations.

He appears to have been Recorder of Coventry in 1450; he was made Escheator of Worcestershire, and in 1447/8 he was under-sheriff of the same county; he became sergeant-at-law in 1453 and was afterwards a Justice of Assize on the northern circuit. In 1466, he was made a judge of the common pleas and, in 1475, a knight of the Bath.

He died, according to the inscription on his tomb in Worcester Cathedral, on 23 August 1481.

== Marriage and issue ==
Littleton married, before Easter term 1447, Joan Burley (died 22 March 1505), widow of Sir Philip Chetwynd (died 10 May 1444) of Ingestre, Staffordshire, and daughter and coheiress of William Burley, esquire, Speaker of the House of Commons, of Broncroft in Corvedale, Shropshire, by his first wife, Ellen Grendon, daughter and co-heiress of John de Grendon of Gayton, by whom he had three sons and two daughters:

- Sir William Littleton (1450–1507), knighted after the Battle of Stoke, was a lawyer at the Inner Temple. He married first Ellen Walsh, daughter of William Walsh of Wanlip, and then Mary Byron, daughter and coheir of Richard Byron of Clayton, by whom he had a daughter, Joan Littleton, who married Sir John Aston of Haywood. He married secondly Mary Whittington, the daughter of William Whittington of Pauntley, Gloucestershire, by whom he had his son and heir, John Littleton (c. 1499–17 May 1532), and a daughter, Anne Littleton, who married Thomas Rouse of Ragley in Warwickshire. By an unknown mistress, he had an illegitimate son, William Littleton alias Lodge, who was the father of Sir Thomas Lodge, Lord Mayor of London.
- Richard Littleton (died 1517) was a lawyer at the Inner Temple. He married Alice Winnesbury.
- Thomas Littleton (died 1524) was a lawyer at Lincoln's Inn. He married Anne Botreaux.
- Ellen Littleton died unmarried.
- Alice Littleton died unmarried.

Through his three sons, he became an ancestor of the families holding the peerages of Cobham (formerly Lyttelton) and Hatherton. His eldest son and heir, Sir William Littleton, became an ancestor of the Lyttelton Baronets, who later acquired the title Baron Lyttelton of Frankley. His second son, Richard Littleton, became the founder of another wealthy dynasty, later to become the Littleton Baronets and later Barons Hatherton, through marriage into the Wynnesbury family of Pillaton Hall, near Penkridge, Staffordshire. His youngest son Thomas's descendants became another line of Littleton baronets, named for Stoke Milburgh, Shropshire.

== Treatise on Tenures ==
=== Background ===
His Treatise on Tenures was probably written after he had been appointed to the bench. According to tradition it is addressed to his second son, Richard, who went to the bar, and whose name occurs in the year books of the reign of Henry VII; it has however been argued that the words mon filz (my son) were simply a conventional way of addressing law students. The book, both historically and from its intrinsic merit, may be characterised as the first text-book upon the English law of property. The law of property in Littleton's time was mainly concerned with rights over land, and it was the law relating to this class of rights that Littleton set himself to digest and classify. The time was ripe for the task: ever since the Norman conquest, regular courts of justice had been at work administering a law that had grown out of an admixture of Teutonic custom and of Norman feudalism.

Under Henry II, the courts had been organised, and the practice of keeping regular records of the proceedings had been carefully observed. The centralising influence of the royal courts and of the justices of assize, working steadily through three centuries, had made the rules governing the law of property uniform throughout the land; local customs were confined within certain prescribed limits, and were only recognised as giving rise to certain well defined classes of rights, such, for instance, as the security of tenure acquired by villains by virtue of the custom of the manor, and the rights of freeholders, in some towns, to dispose of their land by will. Thus, by the time of Littleton (Henry VI and Edward IV), an immense mass of material had been acquired and preserved in the rolls of the various courts. Reports of important cases were published in the "year books". A glance at Statham's Abridgment, the earliest digest of decided cases, published nearly at the same time as Littleton's Tenures, is sufficient to show the enormous bulk that reported cases had already attained as materials for the knowledge of English law.

=== Language ===
Littleton's treatise was written in that peculiar dialect compounded of Norman French and English phrases called law French. Although it had been provided by a statute of Edward III that viva voce proceedings in court should no longer be conducted in the French tongue, "which was much unknown in the realm," the practice of reporting proceedings in that language and of using it in legal treatises lingered till a much later period and was, at length, prohibited by a statute passed in the time of the Commonwealth in 1650.

=== Sources ===
Unlike the preceding writers on English law, Glanville, Bracton, and the authors of the treatises known by the names of Britton and Fleta, Littleton borrows nothing from the sources of Roman law or the commentators. He deals exclusively with English law.

The first two books are stated, in a note to the table at the conclusion of the work, to have been made for the better understanding of certain chapters of the "Ancient Book of Tenures." This refers to a tract called The Old Tenures, said to have been written in the reign of Edward III. By way of distinguishing it from this work, Littleton's book is called in all the early editions "Tenores Novelli."

=== Method ===
The book is written on a definite system and is the first attempt at a scientific classification of rights over land. Littleton's method is to begin with a definition, usually clearly and briefly expressed, of the class of rights with which he is dealing. He then proceeds to illustrate the various characteristics and incidents of the class by stating particular instances, some of which refer to decisions that had actually occurred, but more of which are hypothetical cases put by way of illustration of his principles. He occasionally refers to reported cases. His book is thus much more than a mere digest of judicial decisions; to some extent, he pursues the method that gave Roman law its breadth and consistency of principle. In Roman law, this result was attained through the practice of putting hypothetical cases to jurisconsults hypothetical cases to be solved by them. Littleton, in like manner, is constantly stating and solving, by reference to principles of law, cases that may or may not have occurred in actual practice.

=== Contents ===
In dealing with freehold estates, Littleton adopts a classification that has been followed by all writers who have attempted to systematize the English law of land, especially Sir Matthew Hale and Sir William Blackstone. It is indeed the only possible approach to a scientific arrangement of the intricate "estates in land" that were known to English law. He classifies estates in land by reference to their duration, or, in other words, by reference to the differences between the persons who are entitled to succeed upon the death of the person in possession, or "tenant."

First of all, he describes the characteristics of tenancy in simple terms. In Littleton's time and until the present day, it was the largest interest in land known to the law. Next in order comes tenancy in fee tail, the various classes of which are sketched by Littleton with brevity and accuracy, but he is silent as to the important practice, which first received judicial recognition shortly before his death, of "suffering a recovery," whereby, through a series of judicial fictions, a tenant in fee tail was enabled to convert his estate tail into a fee simple, thus acquiring full power of alienation.

After discussing, in their logical order, other freehold interests in land, he passes to interests in land that were called by later writers interests less than freehold, namely, tenancies for terms of years and tenancies at will. With the exception of tenancy from year to year, now so familiar to us but which was a judicial creation of a date later than the time of Littleton, the first book is a complete statement of the principles of the common law, as they, for the most part, existed until 1925, governing and regulating interests in lands. The first book concludes with a very interesting chapter on copyhold tenures, which marks the exact point at which the tenant—by copy-of-court-roll, the successor of the villein, who, in his turn, represented the freeman reduced to villeinage by the growth of the manorial system—acquired security of tenure.

The second book relates to the reciprocal rights and duties of lord and tenant and is mainly of historical interest to the modern lawyer. It contains a complete statement of the law as it stood in Littleton's time relating to homage, fealty, and escuage, the money compensation to be paid to the lord in lieu of military service to be rendered to the king, a peculiar characteristic of English as distinguished from Continental feudalism.

Littleton then proceeds to notice the important features of tenure by knight's service, with its distinguishing incidents of the right of wardship of the lands and person of the infant heir or heiress, and the right of disposing of the ward in marriage. The non-military freehold tenures are next dealt with: we have an account of "socage tenure," into which all military tenures were subsequently commuted by a now unrecognized act of the Long Parliament in 1650, afterwards reënacted by the well-known statute of Charles II (1660), and of "frankalmoign", or the spiritual tenure by which churchmen held.

In the description of burgage tenure and tenure in villeinage, the life of which consists in the validity of ancient customs recognized by law, we recognize survivals of a time before the iron rule of feudalism had molded the law of land in the interests of the king and the great lords. Finally, he deals with the law of rents, discussing the various kinds of rents that may be reserved to the grantor upon a grant of lands and the remedies for recovery of rent, especially the remedy of distress.

The third and concluding book of Littleton's treatise deals mainly with the various ways in which rights over land can be acquired and terminated in the case of a single possessor or several possessors. This leads him to discuss the various modes in which several persons may simultaneously have rights over the same land, such as parceners (daughters who are co-heiresses, or sons in gavelkind), joint tenants, and tenants in common.

Next follows an elaborate discussion of what are called estates upon condition—a class of interests that occupied a large space in the early common law, giving rise, on one side, to estates tail and, on the other, to mortgages. In Littleton's time, a mortgage, which he carefully describes, was merely a conveyance of land by the tenant to the mortgagee, with a condition that, if the tenant paid the mortgagee a certain sum on a certain day, he might return and have the land again. If the condition was not fulfilled, the interest of the mortgagee became absolute, and Littleton gives no indication of any modification of this strict rule, such as was introduced by courts of equity, permitting the debtor to redeem his land by payment of all that was due to the mortgagee, although the day of payment had passed and his interest had become, at law, indefeasible. The remainder of the work is occupied with an exposition of a miscellaneous class of modes of acquiring rights to property, the analysis of which would occupy too much space.

The work is thus a complete summary of the common law as it stood at the time. It is nearly silent as to the remarkable class of rights that had already assumed vast practical importance—equitable interests in lands. These are only noticed incidentally in the chapter on "Releases." But it was already clear in Littleton's time that this class of rights would become the most important of all.

Littleton's own will, which has been preserved, may be adduced as proof of this assertion. Although nothing was more opposed to the spirit of Norman feudalism than that a tenant of lands should dispose of them by will, we find Littleton directing, by his own will, the "feoffees" (trustees) of certain manors to make estates to the persons named in his will. In other words, in order to acquire over lands powers unknown to the common law, the lands had been conveyed to feoffees who had full right over them according to the common law, but who were under a conscientious obligation to exercise those rights at the direction and for the exclusive benefit of the person to whose "use" the lands were held. This conscientious obligation was recognized and enforced by the Lord Chancellor, and thus arose the class of equitable interests in lands. Littleton was the first writer on English law after these rights had risen into a prominent position, and it is curious to find to what extent they are ignored by him.

=== Editions ===
The first edition of The Tenures appeared in 1481 or 1482, being one of the earliest books printed in London and the earliest treatise on English law printed anywhere. The second edition was printed about 1483 in London, and the third about 1490 in Rouen. These editions and many others were in the original French. In 1766 (second edition 1779) David Hoüard, a Norman advocate, published the Tenures under the title of Anciennes Loix des François conservées dans les coutumes angloises, arguing that they were derived from, and thus the best evidence for, early French customary law. There have also been many editions in English. In 1628, Edward Coke published The First Part of the Institutes of the Laws of England. Or, a Commentary upon Littleton, Not the Name of a Lawyer Onely, but of the Law Itselfe, commonly called "Coke Up on Littleton." There have been about 25 editions of Coke upon Littleton and about 90 editions of The Tenures without the commentary. With or without commentary, The Tenures formed an important part of legal education for almost three centuries and a half and is still cited in the courts of England and the United States as an authority on the feudal law of real estate. Eugene Wambaugh wrote a learned introduction to the 1903 edition of The Tenures (Washington).
