= Sir John Wrottesley, 4th Baronet =

Sir John Wrottesley, 4th Baronet (c.1682–1726), of Wrottesley Hall, Tettenhall, Staffordshire, was a Tory politician who sat in the House of Commons from 1708 to 1710.

Wrottesley was the second, but eldest surviving son of Sir Walter Wrottesley, 3rd Baronet of Wrottesley Hall and his first wife. Eleanor Archer, daughter of Sir John Archer of Coppersale, Essex. He was educated at Rugby School in 1699 and was admitted at Trinity College, Cambridge on 22 April 1700. He married Frances Grey, daughter of Hon. John Grey on 15 January 1704.

At the 1708 British general election, Wrottesley was returned as Tory Member of Parliament for Staffordshire. He made little impression, but voted against the impeachment of Henry Sacheverell in 1710. He did not stand at the 1710 British general election.

In 1712, Wrottesley succeeded his father in the baronetcy. He died in 1726 and was buried at Tettenhall on 1 November 1726. He had three surviving sons and five daughters and was succeeded in the baronetcy by his son Hugh .

Parliament of Great Britain
| Preceded by Henry Paget; Sir Edward Bagot, Bt | Member of Parliament for Staffordshire; 1708–1710; With: Henry Paget | Succeeded by Henry Paget; William Ward |
Baronetage of England
| Preceded by Walter Wrottesley | Baronet (of Wrottesley); 1712-1726 | Succeeded by Hugh Wrottesley |
