= Teddesley Hall =

Coordinates: 52.7397°N 2.0788°W

Teddesley Hall was a large Georgian English country house located close to Penkridge in Staffordshire, now demolished. It was the main seat firstly of the Littleton Baronets and then of the Barons Hatherton. The site today retains considerable traces of the hall, gardens and other buildings, while the former home farm remains a working farm.

== Origins and history ==
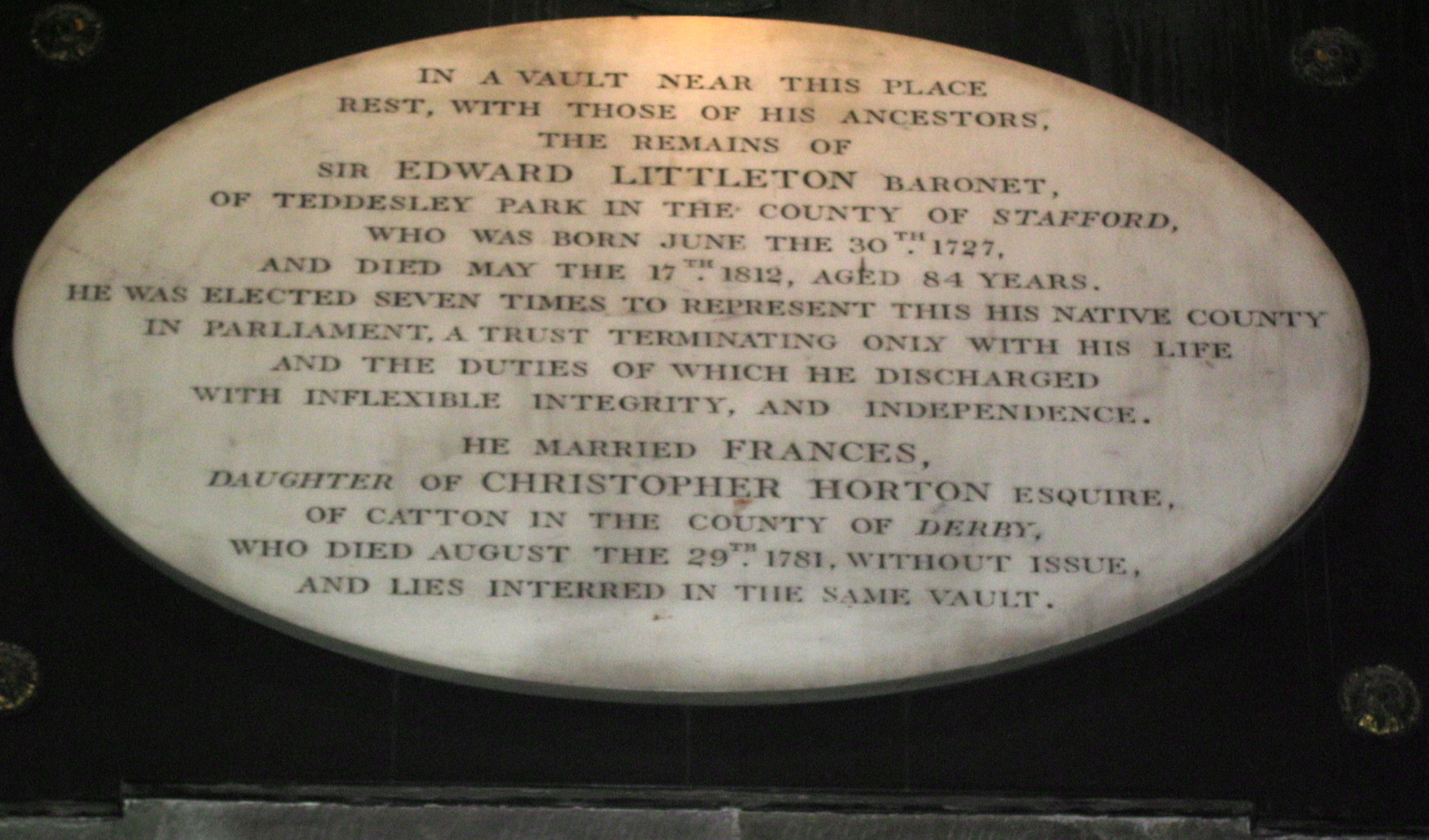
Memorial to Sir Edward Littleton, the 4th and last baronet, who had Teddesley Hall built as a new seat for his family. However, he died without issue in 1812, leaving the estates to his great-nephew. St. Michael and All Angels, Penkridge.

Teddesley Hall was built by Sir Edward Littleton, the fourth to hold the baronetcy, who succeeded in 1742, while still a minor. The Littletons had risen steadily in importance as landowners in the Penkridge area over the course of more than two centuries. Their seat since the early 16th century had been Pillaton Hall, a short distance east of the village, the site of which they had inherited from the Wynnesbury family. They had owned Teddesley Hay, an area of 2,625 acres to the north-east of Penkridge, since the mid-16th century. However, the lords of Pillaton had held it as farmers or lessees for at least three centuries before that. The Hay had been formerly part of the royal forest of Cank or Cannock Chase. It was very sparsely inhabited: in 1666 the assessment for the hearth tax found only three eligible to pay it in the Hay and it had only 59 inhabitants as late as 1811.

The fourth baronet completed his family's dominance in the area by buying the manor of Penkridge from Francis Greville, Lord Brooke in 1749. It seems that he decided to build a new seat for the family at Teddesley around that time, as he moved into the Hall in 1754, before it was entirely completed. It was built on the site of Teddesley Lodge, a smaller house that had earlier accommodated junior members of the Littleton family. It was said that the finance came from large hoards of coins discovered behind panels at Pillaton Hall, which raised the then vast sum of £15,000 on sale.

Sir Edward developed a large park surrounding the Hall. It became noted for the quality of its cattle, and its reputation for agricultural innovation was enhanced by his heir, Edward Walhouse, a great-nephew who changed his name to Littleton in order to succeed to the estates, but not the baronetcy, in 1812. He was to become the first Baron Hatherton in 1835. Hatherton drained and developed a large area of land to expand the farm into a holding of some 1700 acres around the Hall, with 200 cattle and 2000 sheep, 700 acres under cultivation. By 1860, he had established a free agricultural college for 30 boys there.

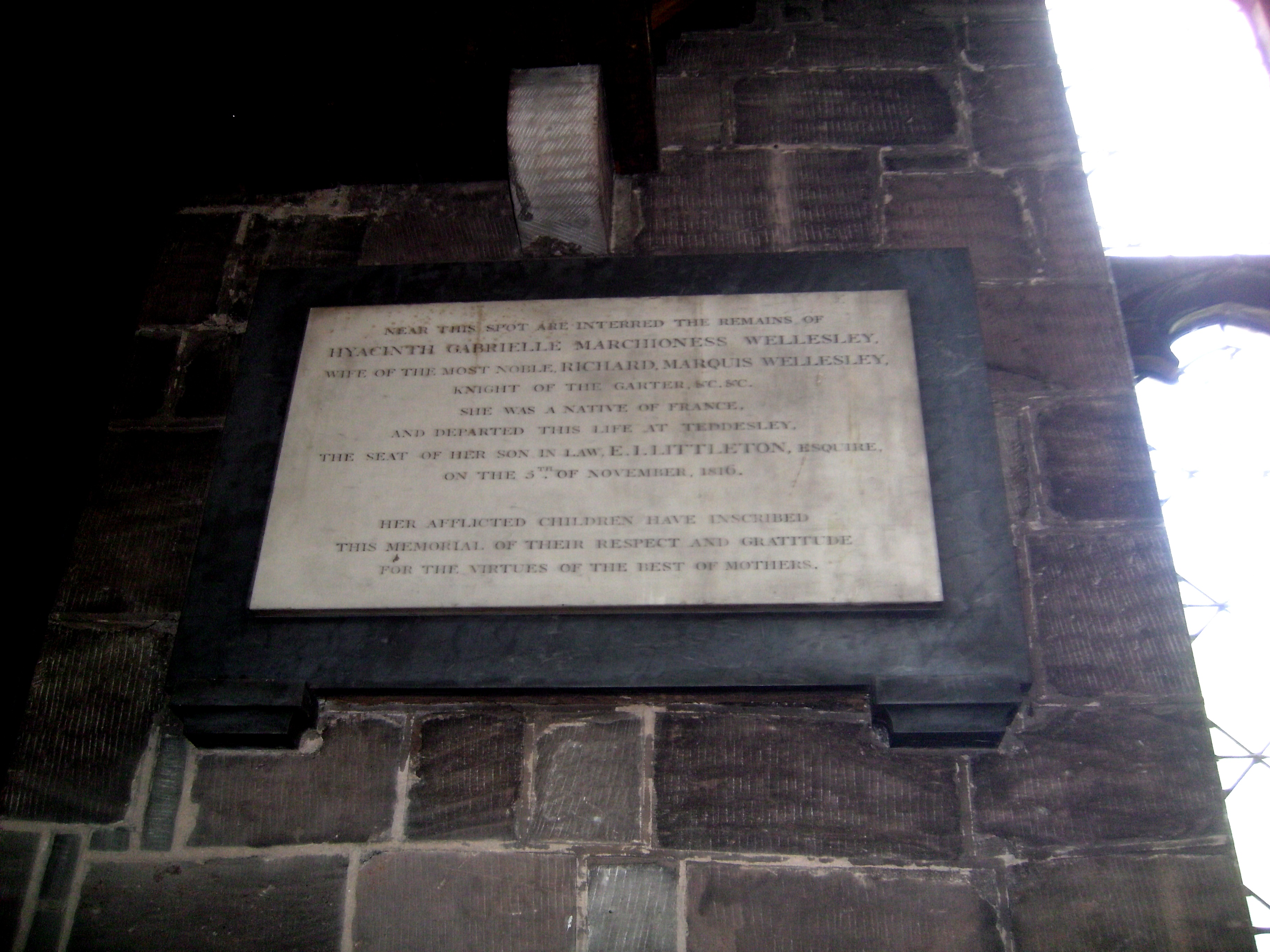
Memorial to Hyacinthe Wellesley, née Roland, who died at Teddesley in 1816. St. Michael's church, Penkridge.

Under Hatherton, Teddesley became a political and literary salon. His first wife, Hyacinth Mary Wellesley, daughter of Richard Wellesley, 1st Marquess Wellesley, and thus niece of the Iron Duke. The Marchioness, Hyacinthe-Gabrielle Roland, Mary's mother, a famous French actress (as "Gabrielle Fagan") in earlier life, was residing at Teddesley when she died in 1816. Mary presided over life at Teddesley during much of Hatherton's political career but died in 1849. Hatherton married Caroline Davenport, almost twenty years his junior, in 1852. An educated middle-class woman, she had liberal political and literary interests of her own, and one of her guests at Teddesley was the novelist Elizabeth Gaskell.

The Hall remained the main seat of the Hathertons for five generations, although the first Baron had also inherited Hatherton Hall, another country house, from which he derived his title. It ceased to be the family home after the death of the third Lord Hatherton in 1930. During World War II it was requisitioned by the government and used for billeting troops and prisoners of war. After the war, it remained empty for some years. The fifth Lord Hatherton sold most of the Littletons' remaining estates in the area in 1953, including the Hall. Being no longer required, it was demolished by the new owner in 1954, as were many such large houses at this time, although the service buildings were kept for storage use.

== Building and grounds ==
The name of the architect who designed Teddesley Hall is not known for certain. It is certain, however, that Charles Cope Trubshaw, forebear of a dynasty of Staffordshire architects, who lived nearby, worked at Teddesley in the early days, so he is a definite candidate. Another possible designer was William Baker, a Cheshire architect who is known to have drawn up plans for buildings in Teddesley Park in 1757–59, about a decade after the likely start date for the Hall.

The Hall was large but austere, a three-storied, square, brick structure, with stone dressings. There were seven windows on the upper storeys on all four faces. Its frontage to the garden had a large, projecting bay. The entrance was pedimented and pilastered and was approached by a double flight of steps. The main room was octagonal and housed an organ.

The main building was linked by curved screen walls to flanking ranges, one housing stables, the other kitchens, stores and servants' rooms. These partially enclosed the entrance court to the house.

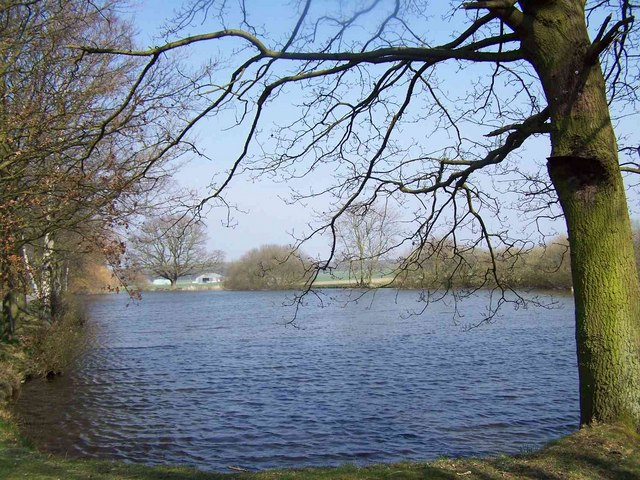
The Keeper's Pool in Teddesley Park.

The grounds contained a formal garden some distance to the south east of the house. To the west was a large expanse of informal parkland, sloping down to the Lodgerail Pool, created by damming a small tributary of the River Penk. The grounds contained a number of other pools and lakes, some intended specifically for fishing. To the north east was a large complex of farm buildings, mostly of 19th century date around an 18th-century core. The overall scope and design of these was owed mainly to the 1st Lord Hatherton. The park was largely bordered by linear wooded areas, the northern section being known as the Wellington Belt.
