= War memorials in Monmouth =

Monmouth War Memorial
- Wales
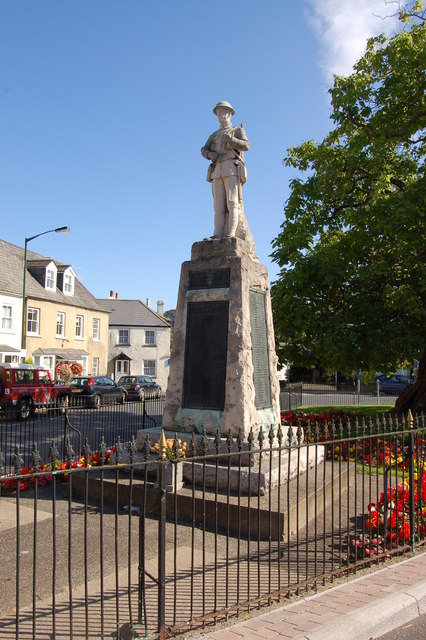
- For Monmouth dead of all wars
- Unveiled: 6 October 1921
- Location: 51.8126°N 2.7099°W near Monmouth
- Designed by: Reginald Harding

Monmouth School Memorial
- Wales
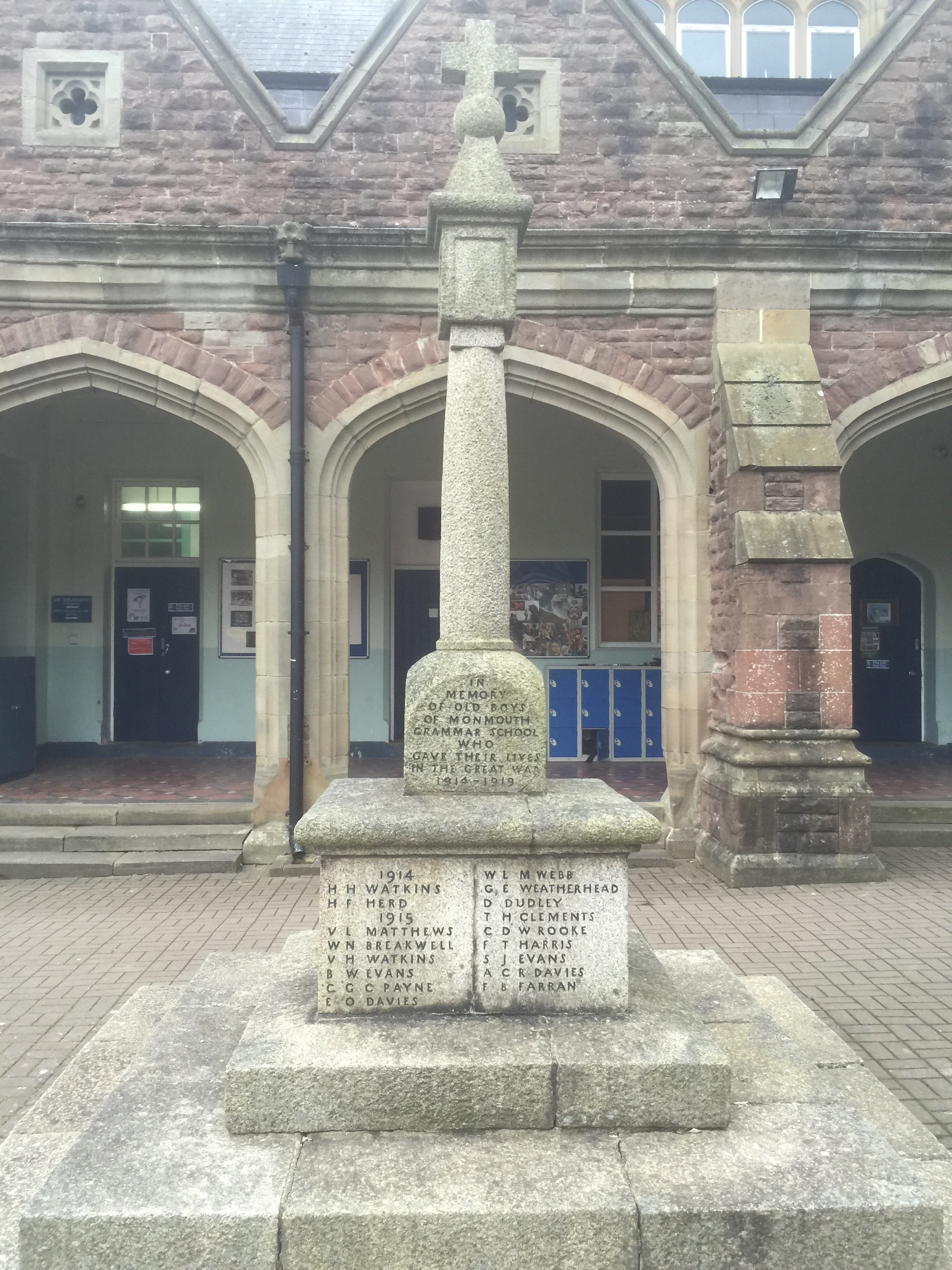
- For Monmouth School War Dead
- Unveiled: 1921
- Location: 51.8111°N 2.7104°W near Monmouth

Royal Monmouthshire Royal Engineers War Memorial
- Wales
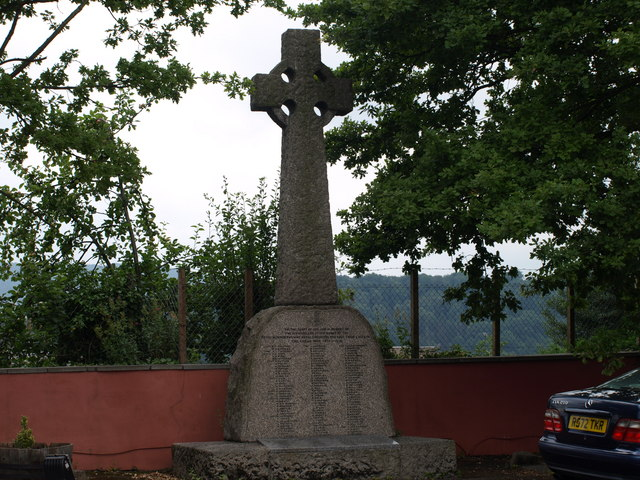
- For The Great War
- Location: 51.8117°N 2.7152°W near Monmouth

There are a number of war memorials in Monmouth, Wales.

Monmouth’s main war memorial is in St. James Square. Monmouth School has its own war memorial and the Royal Monmouthshire Royal Engineers have a memorial at the Monmouth Castle on the parade grounds. One of the oldest memorials in Monmouth is the Naval Temple at the Kymin. All are Grade II listed buildings.

== Naval Temple ==
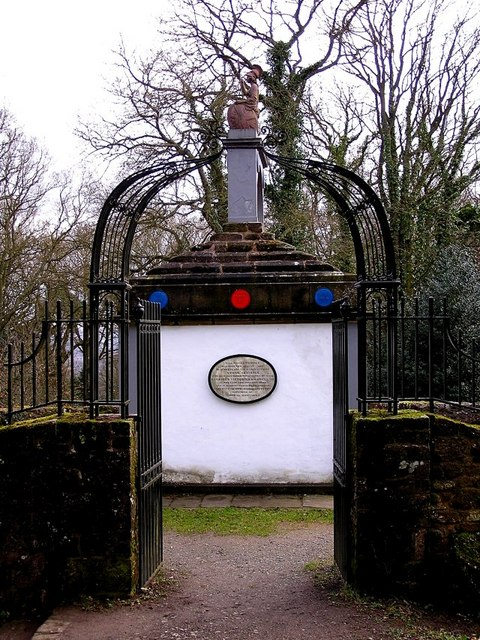
The Naval Temple.

The Naval Temple at The Kymin was built in 1800 to celebrate Britain's victories during the French Revolutionary Wars and is in honour of sixteen Admirals. Its inscription reads:

This Naval Temple was erected in August 1800, to perpetuate the names of those noble Admirals who distinguished themselves by their glorious victories for England in the last and present wars; and is respectfully dedicated to her Grace the Duchess of Beaufort, daughter of Admiral Boscawen. It was unveiled on the second anniversary of the Battle of the Nile.

== St Mary's Church ==
On 7 August 1904 a memorial window in St Mary's Church in Monmouth was unveiled by Lord Tredegar to the memory of the men of the Royal Monmouthshire Royal Engineers who lost their lives in the South African war. The window was partly funded by the Militia and in part by the public.

== St James Square ==
The Monmouth War Memorial in St James Square was unveiled on 6 October 1921. Former soldiers J. Jenkins and J. Pembridge sounded the "Last Post" following the unveiling, which was done by Major Reade DSO MC, headmaster of Monmouth School. Also present was the Mayor, A. T. Blake, Cannon Harding, A. E. Monahan, Vicar of Monmouth, and Major A. C. Tweedy, the town clerk. The area has a Catalpa tree which was planted in c. 1900. The memorial figure itself was by Reginald Harding.

== Monmouth School ==
In 1921 Captain Angus Buchanan VC, a former Head Boy at Monmouth School, opened the ceremony for the Monmouth School War Memorial. Former pupils of the School have been awarded 32 Military Crosses, 11 Distinguished Service Orders, 8 Flying medals (DFC, AFC and DFM), and 1 Victoria Cross. One hundred and forty three old boys fell in battle in the 20th century.

== Royal Monmouthshire Royal Engineers ==
The War Memorial of the Royal Monmouthshire Royal Engineers is located at the western edge of the site on Castle Hill occupied by the Regimental Museum at Monmouth Castle. This memorial is dedicated:

To the glory of God and in memory of
the officers and other ranks of the
Royal Monmouthshire Royal Engineers who gave their lives in
the Great War 1914-1918.

Underneath are the names of 100 soldiers of the RMRE who died in the Great War. A marble slab at the base commemorates those who died in the Second World War.

== Polish servicemen ==
A small war memorial erected in 1969 dedicated to the Polish servicemen who died at Monte Casino is on the bank of the River Wye near Redbrook. This monument was erected on the 25th anniversary of the battle.
