= West Monmouth School =

- Ysgol Gorllewin Mynwy
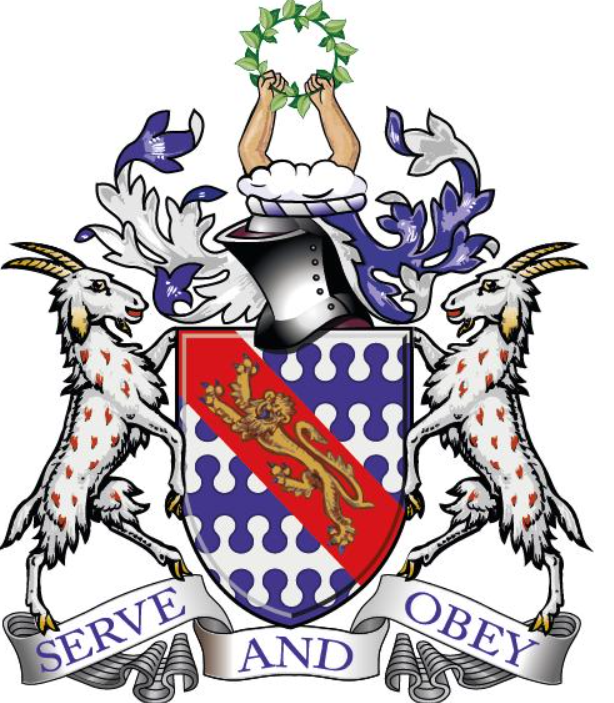
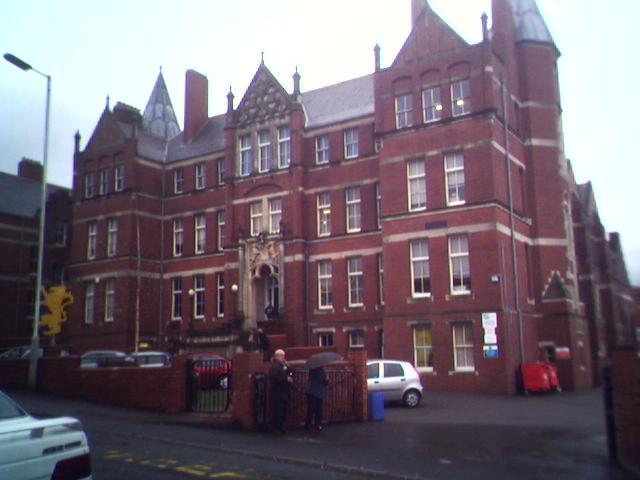
- Coat of arms of the Haberdashers' Company Main School Building

Location
- Blaendare Road; Pontypool, Torfaen, NP4 5YG; Wales; 51.6965°N 3.0376°W

Information
- Type: Comprehensive
- Mottoes: Believe, Achieve, Succeed; Serve & Obey
- Established: 1898; 128 years ago
- Founder: Worshipful Company of Haberdashers
- Local authority: Torfaen
- Chair of Governors: Janet Bond
- Head teacher: Emma Jordan
- Gender: Co-educational
- Age: 11 to 16
- Enrolment: 1174
- Colours: Navy blue, red and green
- Website: www.westmonmouthschool.org.uk

West Monmouth School (Welsh: Ysgol Gorllewin Mynwy; colloquially: West Mon) is a state-funded and non-selective secondary school in Pontypool, Torfaen, South Wales.

== Admissions ==
Pupils who attend the school generally live in the Torfaen area. The school offers education for 11-year-olds to 16-year-olds, and 1,174 pupils are currently enrolled there as of September 2024.

== History ==
The school owes its existence to the charitable donations of haberdasher William Jones, who died in 1615. He bequeathed money to the Worshipful Company of Haberdashers for the foundation of a grammar school in Monmouth. An accumulation of funds by the end of the nineteenth century encouraged Monmouth School to build a sister school to serve western Monmouthshire.

=== Grammar school ===
After much discussion and debate the town of Pontypool was chosen after land of six acres (24,000 m2) was donated by local landowner John Capel Hanbury. In 1896 the foundation stone of what was then known as Jones' West Monmouth School was laid by Louisa Eager, wife of John Hanbury. The school was officially opened by Godfrey Morgan, 1st Viscount Tredegar in 1898, to accommodate 70 boarders and 30 day boys. The total cost of erecting the school was estimated at £30,000.

The original school buildings were designed by Henry Stock, the Haberdashers’ in-house architect, who also designed structures at Monmouth School for Boys and the main block at Monmouth School for Girls. Stock constructed the West Monmouth school of red brick, with stone dressings and roofs of Welsh slate. It is a Grade II listed building. The school became a county grammar school (under the auspices of the then Monmouthshire County Council) in 1954, and the last boarders left in 1958.

=== Comprehensive ===
In 1982 the school lost its grammar school status to become a comprehensive school when amalgamated with the three local secondary modern schools at Twmpath, Trevethin and the Wern. A new block (known simply as 'N Block') was constructed and now houses the mathematics, technology and some humanities classrooms. A new music and performing arts centre was built on the site of the old swimming pool in 2001 which gave the school some of the best facilities in Torfaen.

== Expansion and changes of school buildings ==
The school's original building with its tall spires and grand entrance became too small for the school numbers. By 1934 a new 'Science Block' building had been added at a cost of £20,000 and contained extra classrooms and modern laboratories.

The school recently went through a six million pound overhaul that has seen numerous changes. The school now has performing arts facilities including an auditorium housed in the Haberdashers' Building. The special educational needs department has been expanded and there is a new cafeteria.

== Facilities ==
West Mon has an AstroTurf football pitch which has floodlights. As of November 2019, the AstroTurf was closed due to it being upgraded to a 4G pitch which will come with new flood lights and fence, construction was due to finish in early April 2020. There is also a performing arts centre and two gymnasia. There are six IT suites and a comprehensive technology centre. The school also has a running track, tennis courts and the Albion rugby fields nearby. The school has been extended once again; the old dining hall has been converted into classrooms and a new cafeteria built on the west side of the site. This was due to the amalgamation of Trevethin Community School which closed in 2007. The new building is called 'Haberdashers Block' in a nod to its history and The Haberdashers' Company. It contains the Canteen plus Drama Theatre downstairs and 7 classrooms on the first floor.

== Names ==
The school has been known by a variety of names over the last 100 years. Originally conceived as Jones' West Monmouth School it has also been known as Haberdashers' West Monmouth School, West Monmouth Boys' School and in later years West Monmouth Grammar School. Today the school is often referred to (incorrectly) as West Monmouth Comprehensive School. Internally the school use the shorthand names West Mon or WMS. There is at least one plaque in the school that refers to it as Jones' West Monmouthshire School. The official name, however, is West Monmouth School.

== Notable alumni ==
Arts and Entertainment

- Sir Anthony Hopkins - actor

Public Life

- Ivor Bulmer-Thomas CBE - Labour (then Conservative for two years) MP for Keighley from 1942–50
- David Philip Gething MBE, Former Consul on Her Majesty's Diplomatic Service.
- Theodore Huckle QC - Counsel General for Wales
- David Gwilym James - Vice-Chancellor from 1952-65 of the University of Southampton
- Alun Gwynne Jones, Baron Chalfont of Llantarnam in the County of Monmouthshire OBE MC - former Foreign Office minister from 1964–70, and Chairman of the Radio Authority from 1991-4
- Noel Debroy Jones - Bishop of Sodor and Man from 1989–2003
- Paul Murphy - Former Labour MP for Torfaen, now life peer Baron Murphy of Torfaen
- Rhys Probert CB - Director from 1973-80 of the Royal Aircraft Establishment
- Edwin Stevens CBE - Inventor of the first hearing aid

Sporting

- James Waite - Gloucester City football player
- Terry Cobner - Wales international rugby union player
- Ken Jones - Wales international rugby union player
- Bryn Meredith - Wales international rugby union player
- Graham Price - Wales international rugby union player
- Iestyn Thomas - Wales international rugby union player
- Mako Vunipola - England international rugby union player

== See also ==
- Monmouth School - independent school, previously known as Monmouth Grammar School
