= Monmouth Alms Houses =

Charitable organisation

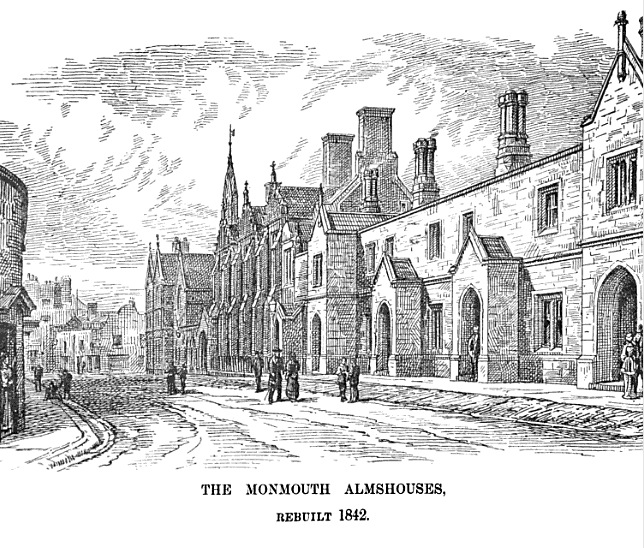
- Founded: 1614
- Founder: William Jones
- Location: Monmouth, Wales, UK
- Coordinates: 51.811643°N 2.712389°W

The Monmouth Alms Houses of Monmouth, Wales are funded by the charity established by the haberdasher William Jones before his death in 1615. That charity also established schools in Monmouth and a lectureship in London. The Haberdashers' Company served as trustee of the charity from 1613 until 2011, when the trusteeship was transferred to Bristol Charities. A second charity established through a separate bequest by Jones enabled the building of the Newland Alms Houses in the Forest of Dean. The original Monmouth Alms Houses were constructed in 1614; they were rebuilt in 1842 and 1961. The fourth version of the Monmouth Alms Houses was completed in 2013 and is named 'Cwrt William Jones Almshouses' and is owned and managed by Bristol Charities under the name of 'William Jones Almshouse Charity'. The original alms houses were located on what is now known as Almshouse Street. The most recent houses are located off St James' Square.

== William Jones ==
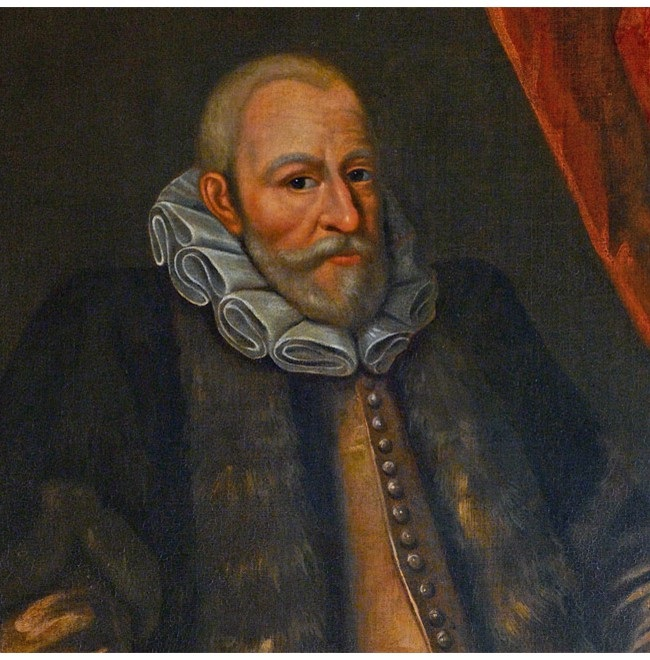
William Jones

The first alms houses in Monmouth were founded by a wealthy merchant, the haberdasher William Jones, during the reign of James I. Jones had been a native of Newland, Gloucestershire, England, where he was born about 1545–1550. However, prior to his 1 Oct 1600 invitation to join the membership of the Haberdashers' Company, there is fairly little reliable information about his life. Consequently, a number of different stories exist which vary with regard to the details of his youth. One account indicates that, unable to pay a fine in Newland, he instead moved to London and found employment as a porter to a merchant. He eventually amassed a large fortune and decided to test the generosity of his native city. Accordingly, he disguised himself and sought financial assistance. However, he was refused and referred to Monmouth. There, he was received more favorably. Jones then revealed his true identity and expressed his appreciation financially. However, author William Meyler Warlow dismisses this account, including the disguise as a poor man, as fiction.

Rather, he indicates that Jones was of gentle, but not noble, birth and went to Monmouth in his youth to apprentice, and that his acquaintance with the area in his youth most probably was responsible for his benevolence to the town. The author speculates that some of the stories arose in an attempt to explain the difference in how the towns of Newland and Monmouth fared. He indicates that the primary difference was in how the money to the towns was invested. Jones founded not only the Monmouth Alms Houses, but also the Free School in Monmouth. He also founded an alms house in Newland, Gloucestershire and a lectureship in London. In early 1613, he arranged for £6,000 to be spent for charitable purposes, giving it to the Haberdashers' Company to found the Monmouth Alms Houses and the London lectureship during his lifetime. The first record of the establishment of his charity is found in the company minutes of 5 March 1613. By 22 April 1614, Jones had also decided to found a school in Monmouth. William Jones died in Hamburg, Germany in January 1615. In his will, executed in Hamburg on 26 December 1614, he appointed the Haberdashers' Company, formally known as The Worshipful Company of Haberdashers, as trustee of his charity, and bequeathed another £3,000, of which £2,000 was paid out before his death. There were numerous other bequests to friends, relatives, servants, and organizations.

== William Jones's Alms House Charity ==
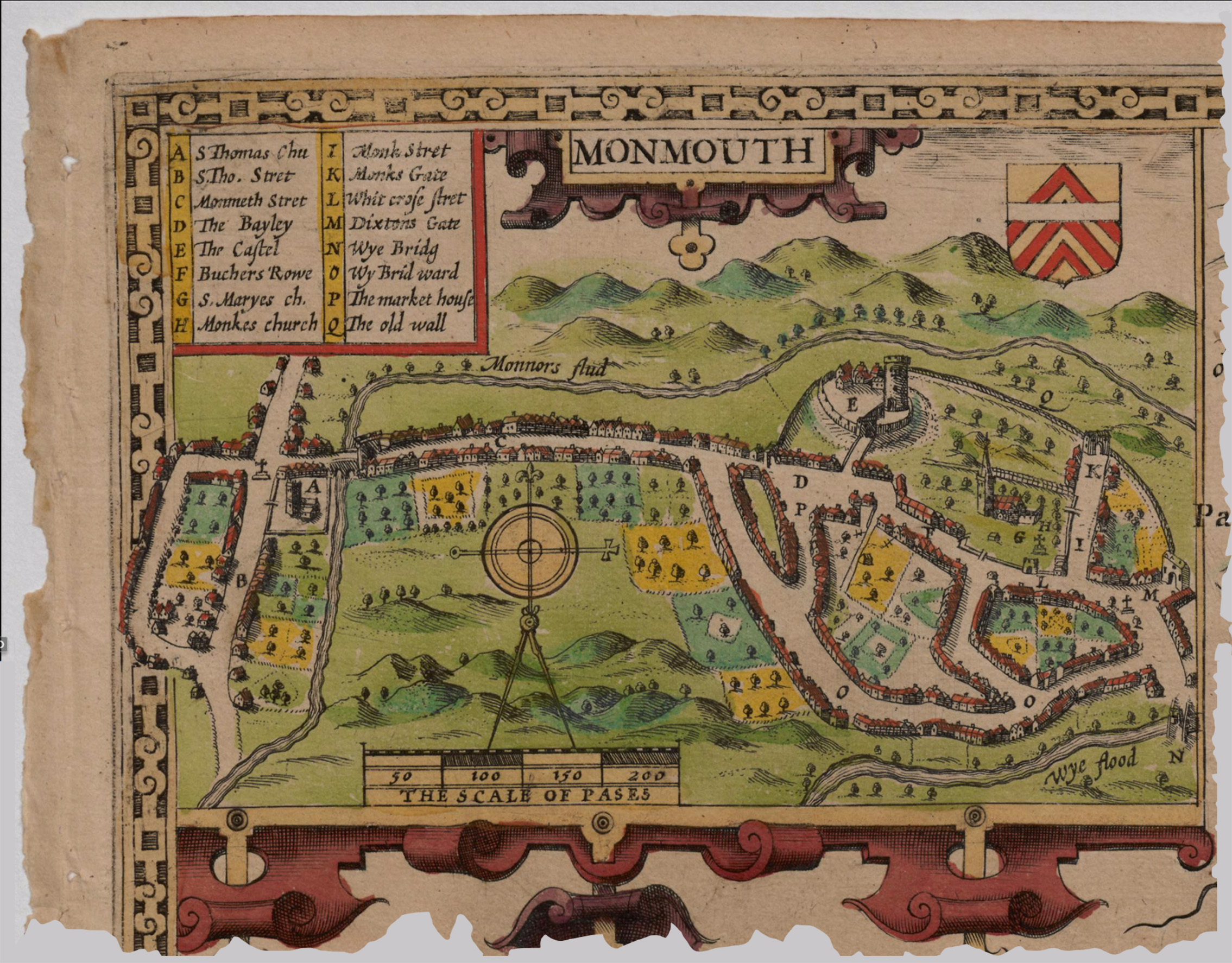
Cartographer John Speed's Map of Monmouth, Monmouthshire, Wales, 1610

The charity was officially established during the lifetime of William Jones. The letters patent, granted by King James I, were dated 19 March 1614. The original site of the Monmouth Alms Houses and Monmouth School and Chapel was the area bounded by four roads: Bridge Street, Almshouse Street (then part of Whitecross Street), Weirhead Street, and the road leading to Wye Bridge. The original twenty Monmouth Alms Houses were constructed in that area of Monmouth during the summer of 1614. The Monmouth Alms Houses were rebuilt in 1842 and 1961. A second charity was established for the town of Newland based on Jones's bequest of £5,000 to that town. The letters patent for the Newland charity were dated 20 July 1619. The 16 Newland Alms Houses and preacher's house had already been erected in 1616 to 1617. The original Newland Alms Houses were added to the National Heritage List for England on 12 December 1953 as Grade II listed buildings. The William Jones's Alms House Charities continued to fund alms houses in both Monmouth, South Wales and Newland, Forest of Dean until recently. Due to the limited amenities in Newland and the age of the early 17th century Newland Alms Houses, which were difficult to modernize, the decision was made to concentrate alms house activity in Monmouth. The Newland Alms Houses were closed and the facility sold in 2010. The Haberdashers' Company had acted as trustee of the charity since 1613. In January 2007, Bristol Charities assumed management responsibilities for the charity. In June 2011 the trusteeship of the charity was transferred from the Haberdashers' Company to Bristol Charities.

== Redevelopment of the Monmouth Alms Houses ==
The recent Monmouth Alms Houses dated from 1961. They consisted of nineteen small units. The residents of those units were temporarily relocated, and the Alms Houses closed in May 2008. Demolition of the Alms Houses off St James' Square began on Thursday, 23 February 2012. and consists of 24 one-bedroom apartments, which were ready for occupancy in early 2013. Housing developer Lovell was awarded the contract for the new flats. In addition, ten mews homes are available for sale. The future gated development of flats and houses is named Cwrt William Jones.
