= Chapel House, Monmouth =

Grade II* building in Monmouth, Wales

Chapel House
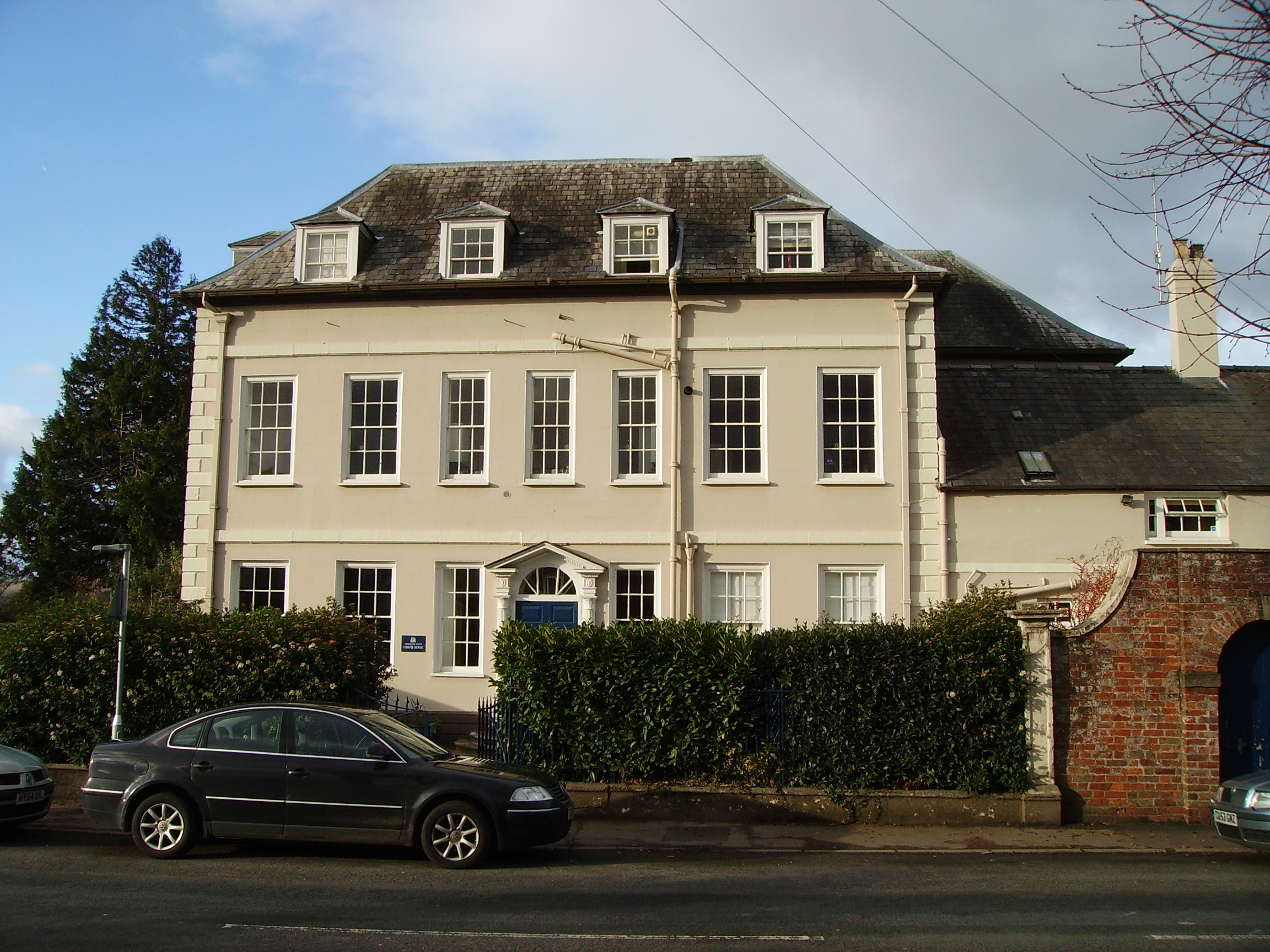
- "the best house in the entire street"
- Interactive map of the Chapel House area

General information
- Status: Boarding House
- Architectural style: Georgian
- Location: Hereford Road, Monmouth, Wales
- Coordinates: 51.8154°N 2.7134°W
- Completed: 1752
- Owner: Monmouth School

Design and construction
- Designations: Grade II* listed building / Cadw/ICOMOS Register of Parks and Gardens of Special Historic Interest in Wales

Chapel House, Hereford Road, Monmouth, Wales, is a Georgian townhouse, built in the early eighteenth century, described by the architectural historian John Newman, as "the best house in the entire street". The house was designated a Grade II* listed building on 27 June 1952. Chapel House was a boarding house of Monmouth School until 2025. Following consolidation of the school’s built estate, it was put up for sale in 2026.

== History ==
The house, originally called The Chantry, then St Brides, is substantially of the early eighteenth century. It has been credited as replacing another building on the same site, although no evidence of this has been found. It was built or improved by the ironmaster William Rea, a former Mayor of Monmouth, around 1720. The windows were replaced and a new entrance doorway was added around 1800, probably by ironmaster David Tanner. Chapel House was restored in 1910 by Humphrey Farran Hall who repaired the panelling. When it was reroofed in the later twentieth century, the large chimney stacks were removed.

The name changed from St Brides in the late 1970s when Chapel House, a boarding house of Monmouth School for Boys, relocated from St James's Street. In 2026, following consolidation of the school’s built estate after the merger of the boys’ and girls’ schools, the property was offered for sale for £1.5m.

== Description ==
The building is of "seven bays under a hipped roof." Like several other 18th century houses in Monmouth, it gives the appearance of being two buildings built back to back. The garden front is longer than the street front. It is listed by Cadw at Grade II*. The red-brick walls to the sides, which have a Grade II listing, are “contemporary” with the house and give access to a service court and to the garden stretching down to the River Monnow. The garden itself represents a "rare substantial townhouse garden from the early 18th century". It is registered at Grade II on the Register of Parks and Gardens of Special Historic Interest in Wales. The interior contains plasterwork and a staircase which "echo Troy House and Great Castle House", although John Newman considers that the quality of the interior fittings surpasses those of either.

== Sources ==
- Newman, John (2000). Gwent/Monmouthshire. The Buildings of Wales. London: Penguin. ISBN 978-0-3000-9630-9.
- — (2009). Gray, Madeleine; Morgan, Prys; Griffiths, Ralph A. (eds.). The Making of Monmouthshire, c.1536–1780. The Gwent County History. Vol. 3. Cardiff: University of Wales Press. ISBN 978-0-7083-2198-0. OCLC 552064875.
