= Rhys Probert =

British aerospace engineer (1921–1980)

Rhys Probert, CB (28 May 1921 – 1980), was a British aeronautical engineer. He was the son of the Reverend Thomas and Margaret Jane Probert of Blackwood, South Wales.

== Early life ==
Probert had his first education at Jones West Monmouth School, then at St Catharine's College, Cambridge.

== Career ==
From 1942-1944, Probert worked at the Royal Aircraft Establishment. He moved to Power Jets (Research and Development) Ltd in 1944, staying until 1946. He spent a brief time at the Applied Physics Laboratory, Johns Hopkins University, from 1946-1947. He joined the National Gas Turbine Establishment in 1947 and remained there until 1963 (as Deputy Director after 1957). Between 1963 and 1968, he was the Director-General of Scientific Research/Air, Ministry of Aviation. From 1968 until 1972, he was Deputy Controller of Aircraft, at the Ministry of Technology, and later the Ministry of Defence. Probert ended his career by returning to the Royal Aircraft Establishment as Director from 1973 until 1980. He was President of the Royal Aeronautical Society from 1979 until 1980.

Probert made notable contributions to many aircraft technologies, including ramjets, scramjets, vertical takeoff for Harrier jump jets, and reheat (afterburners).

His papers are available at the University of Cambridge, at the Churchill Archives Centre.

== Personal life ==
In 1947, Probert married Carolyn Cleasby, of Lancaster, New Hampshire, USA. They had three sons and one daughter.

He was made a Companion of the Bath in 1972. He died of pancreatic cancer in 1980.

Professional and academic associations
Preceded by Prof Lewis Crabtree	President of the Royal Aeronautical Society; 1979-80	Succeeded by Peter Hearne
