= Henry Stock =

British architect (1824–1909)

Henry Stock FRIBA
- Born: 1824/5; London, England
- Died: 11 June 1909; Sandown, Isle of Wight
- Occupation: Architect
- Buildings: Haberdashers' Monmouth School for Girls; Monmouth School for Boys; West Monmouth School

Henry Stock FRIBA (1824/5–1909) was a British architect. He served as the county surveyor for Essex for nearly 50 years, and as the surveyor and architect to the Worshipful Company of Haberdashers. The latter appointment led Stock to undertake a considerable number of educational commissions, but his primary field of activity was in the construction of manufacturing sites and warehouses in London.

== Life and works ==
Henry Stock was born in 1824/5. (Note: Antonia Brodie, in her Directory of British Architects, 1834–1914, indicates Stock's year of birth as either 1824 or 1825.) He came from a family of builders and developers located in London's East End. Articled to George Allen, of Tooley Street, Southwark, in 1840, Stock took over the business on Allen's death in 1847, going into partnership with a surveyor, William Snooke, at Allen's old offices at 69, Tooley Street.

Stock and Snooke's business was primarily industrial and commercial. Their buildings included a biscuit factory at Bermondsey for Peek Freans; (Note: Twiglets were invented in Stock's Bermondsey factory in 1929.) the Anchor Brewery in Southwark for Barclay, Perkins & Co.; another brewery, the Ram Brewery at Wandsworth for Young & Co.; and the cotton warehouse on Tooley Street, which had earlier been designed by Snooke and was renamed The Counting House, following its rebuilding after destruction in the 1861 Tooley Street fire.

Stock and Snooke were appointed architects and surveyors to the Worshipful Company of Haberdashers in 1882, although both had undertaken work for the company prior to this date. Examples of their work in Wales include: the Design and Technology Centre (Stock alone), day houses and School House (the former by Snooke in 1877–1878 and the latter by Stock in 1895–1896), the Chapel and Library (1860–1865), and the central block (Stock alone 1895–1896), all at Monmouth School for Boys; Haberdashers' Monmouth School for Girls in the Jacobethan style he favoured for schools, and West Monmouth School. Snooke and Stock also undertook residential developments at New Cross and at Telegraph Hill in south London. The New Cross estate had been purchased in 1614 to provide a source of funding for the school established at Monmouth by William Jones. (Note: Originally market gardens, the residential development of the New Cross estate in the 19th century, to provide accommodation for the rapidly-growing population of London, provided the Haberdashers with an enormous income which made Monmouth School one of the wealthiest schools in the late Victorian era.)

Stock held the post of County Surveyor for Essex from 1856 to 1900 and designed many public buildings and bridges in the county. In 1885 he was elected a Fellow of the Royal Institute of British Architects. He retired to Sandown on the Isle of Wight in 1904 and died there in 1909. His son, Henry William Stock, was also an architect and worked in his father's practice.

=== Works ===
- Monmouth School for Boys (1860–1890s) – work with Snooke and independently
- Tooley Street warehouses (1860) – by Snooke and Stock
- Buck's Row (Durward Street), Whitechapel (c.1861) – Manure works for George Torr, now the site of Swanlea School
- Church of St Mary, Stifford, Essex (1861–1863) – restoration
- School, Buck's Row, 6 Durward Street, Whitechapel (1862) – a ragged school sponsored by George Torr
- Braintree and Bocking Literary and Mechanics' Institution, Braintree, Essex (1863) – a gift to the town from George Courtauld
- St John the Baptist's Church, Finchingfield, Essex (1865–1866) – addition of a porch and restoration (Note: James Bettley, in his 2007 revised volume Essex, in the Pevsner Buildings of England series, suggests that Stock's father was the vicar and patron of Finchingfield.)
- Bridge, Battlesbridge, Essex (1872–1873) – built by William Webster to Stock's design after the earlier bridge, designed by Stock's predecessor as County Surveyor, Thomas Hopper, was destroyed by a steam traction engine. (Note: The Historic England record notes William Webster as the builder but omits Stock's role as architect.)
- Peek Freans factory, Clement Road, Bermondsey (1880s) - part of a large manufacturing and packing plant with workers’ housing, shops, an independent fire brigade etc., which saw the area nicknamed Biscuit Town. As of 2020, being redeveloped as residential accommodation.
- Ram Brewery (1882–1883) – rebuilding following a fire
- St Anne's Church, Kew (1884) – reconstruction of the southern end of the church
- Police station, Saffron Waldon, Essex (1884–1886) – undertaken in his role as County Surveyor
- The Counting House, Tooley Street, Southwark – rebuilding in 1887 following the 1861 Tooley Street fire
- Haberdashers' School for Girls (1890)
- Haberdashers' Monmouth School for Girls (1892–1896)
- Church of St Catherine, Pepys Road, New Cross (1893–1894) – much altered
- West Monmouth School (1897)

== Gallery ==
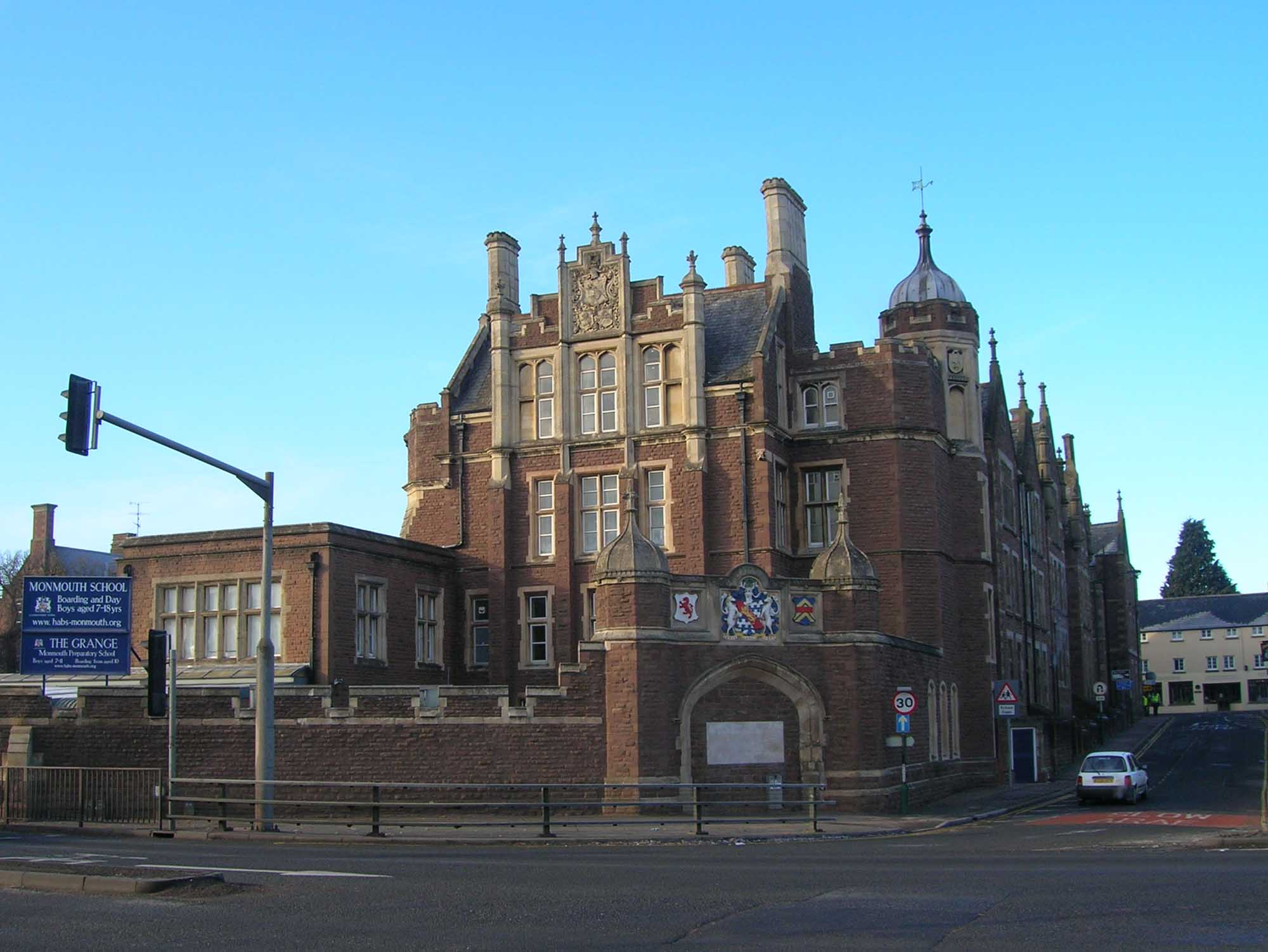
School House and gateway at Monmouth School for Boys 1894–1895

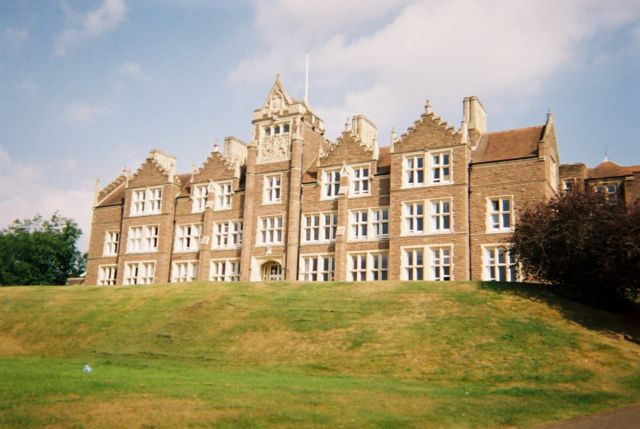
Haberdashers' Monmouth School for Girls Main block

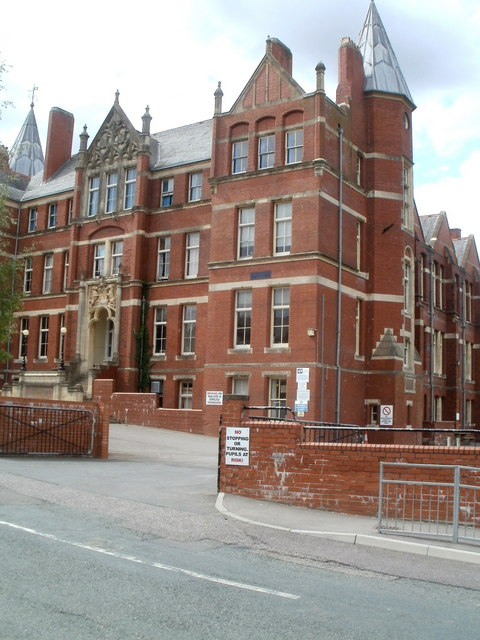
West Monmouth School

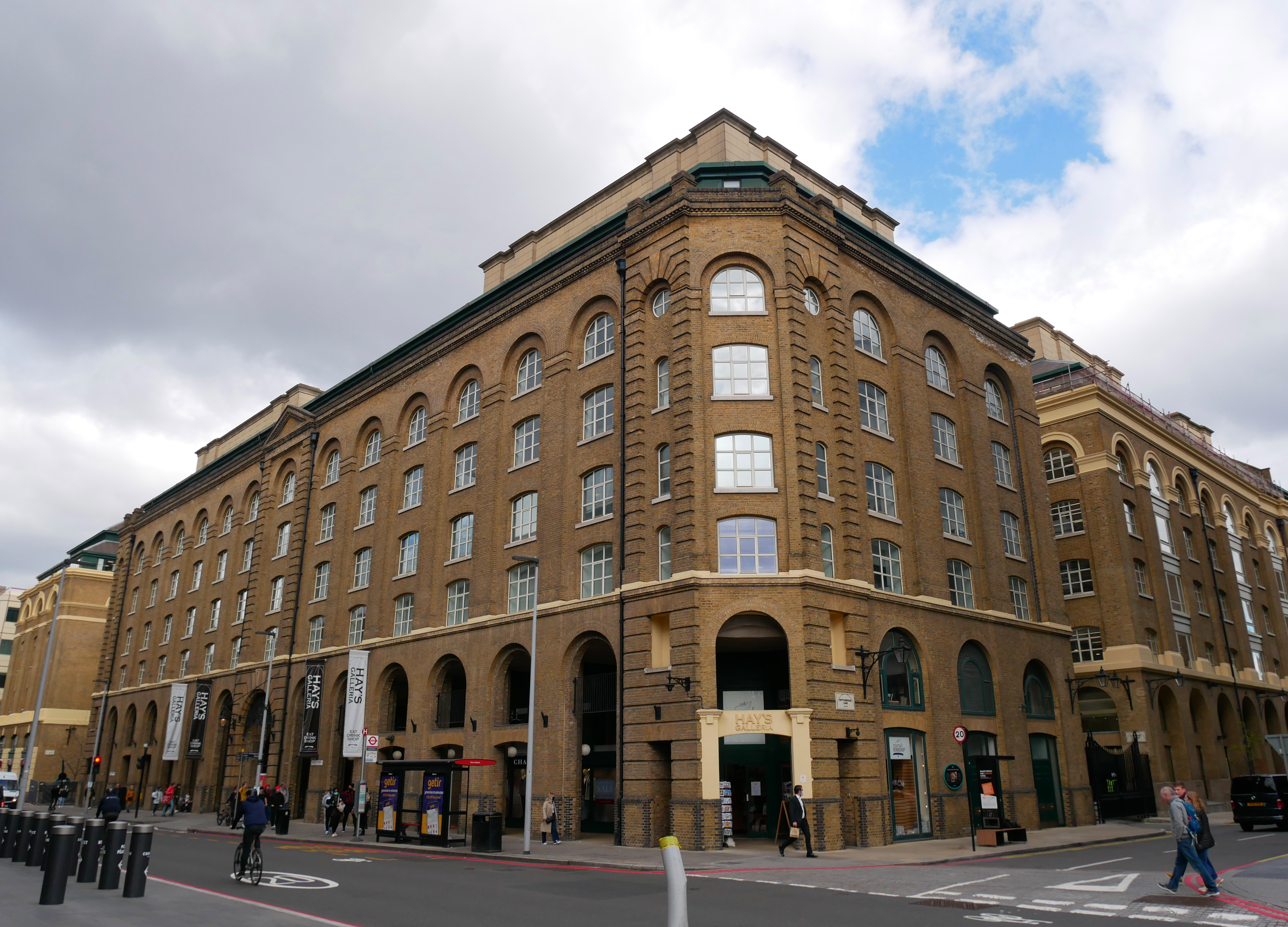
The Counting House, Tooley Street, Southwark, London

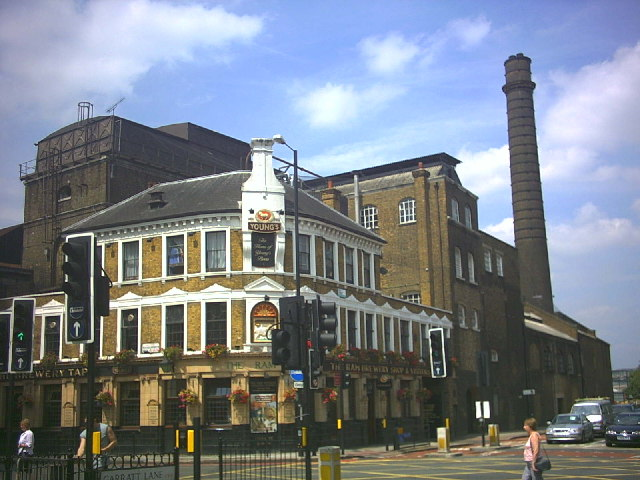
The Ram Brewery complex, Wandsworth

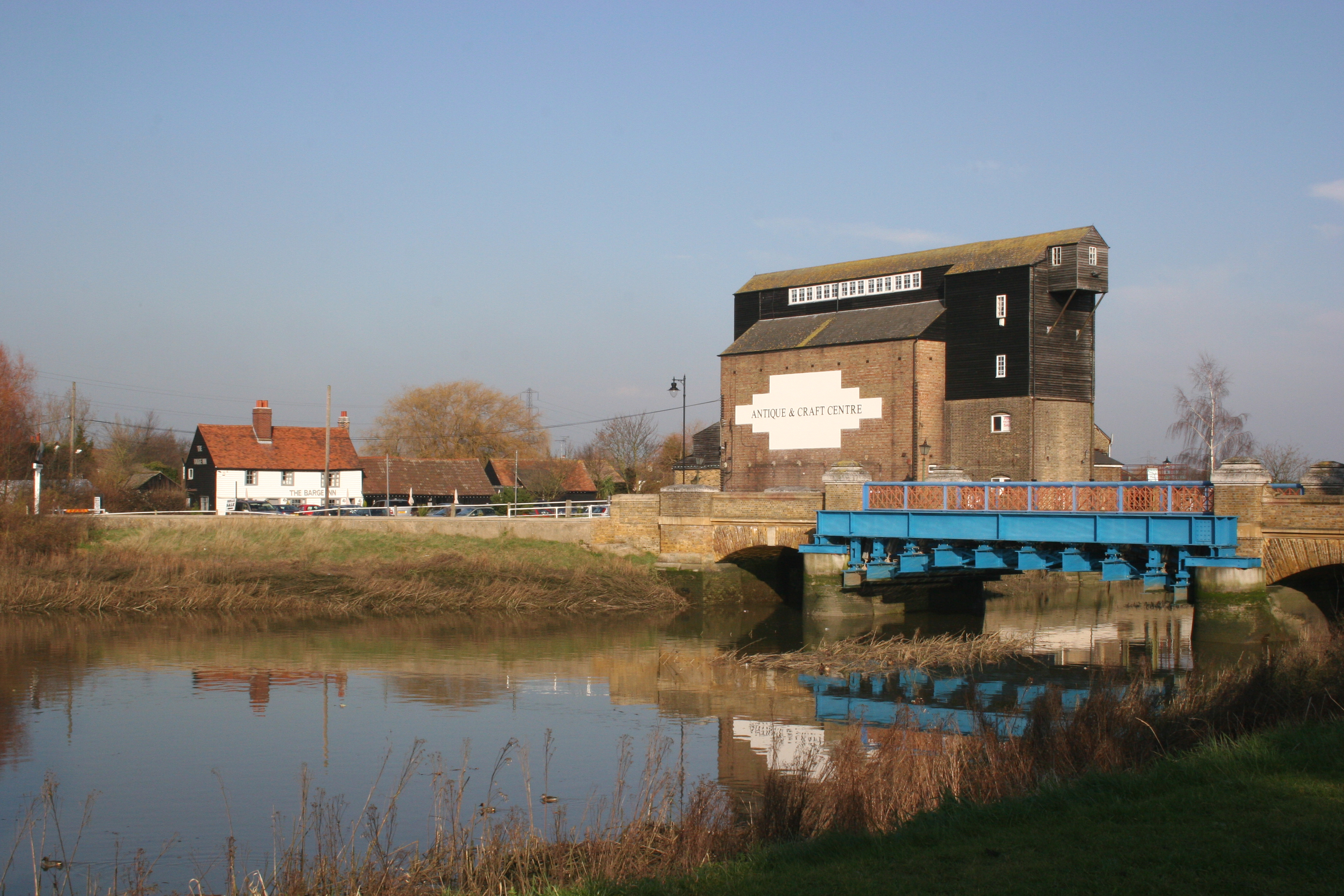
The bridge at Battlesbridge

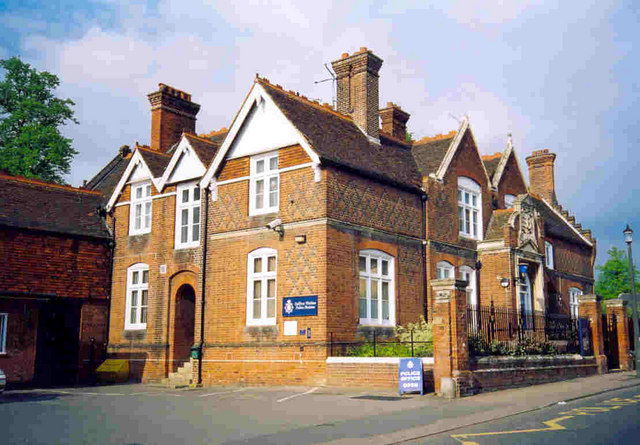
Police station at Saffron Waldon (1884–1886)

== Sources ==
- Bettley, James; Pevsner, Nikolaus (2007). Essex. The Buildings of England. New Haven, US and London: Yale University Press. ISBN 978-0-300-11614-4. OCLC 1042848015.
- Brodie, Antonia (2001). Directory of British Architects, 1834–1914. Vol. 2 (L–Z). British Architectural Library. ISBN 978-0-826-45514-7.
- Edwards, Stephen; Moseley, Keith (2014). Monmouth School: The First 400 Years. London: Third Millennium Publishing. ISBN 978-1-906507-91-6.
- Cherry, Bridget; Pevsner, Nikolaus (2002). London 2: South. The Buildings of England. New Haven, US and London: Yale University Press. ISBN 978-0-300-09651-4. OCLC 719418472.
- Pearson, Lynn (1999). British Breweries: An architectural history. London: Bloomsbury Publishing. ISBN 978-0-826-43460-9.
- Webb, Andrew (2012). Food Britannia. London: Random House. ISBN 978-1-409-02222-0.
