= William Marsh (cricketer) =

Welsh cricketer

Personal information
- Full name: William Edward Marsh
- Born: 10 September 1917; Newbridge, Monmouthshire, Wales
- Died: 6 February 1978 (aged 60); Newbridge, Monmouthshire, Wales
- Bowling: Right-arm fast-medium

Domestic team information
- Years: Team
- 1947: Glamorgan

Career statistics
Competition	FC
Matches	4
Runs scored	39
Batting average	7.80
100s/50s	–/–
Top score	13
Balls bowled	385
Wickets	8
Bowling average	36.25
5 wickets in innings	–
10 wickets in match	–
Best bowling	3/70
Catches/stumpings	2/–
- Source: Cricinfo, 3 July 2010

William Edward Marsh (10 September 1917 – 6 February 1978) was a Welsh cricketer. Marsh was a right-arm fast-medium bowler. He was born at Newbridge, Monmouthshire. He was educated at Monmouth School.

Marsh made his first-class debut for Glamorgan in 1947 against Middlesex. He played 3 further first-class matches for the county in the 1935 season, with his final appearance coming against Worcestershire. In his 4 first-class matches, Marsh took 8 wickets at a bowling average of 36.25, with best figures of 3/70.

Marsh died at Newbridge, Monmouthshire on 6 February 1978.
