= Haberdashers' Monmouth School =

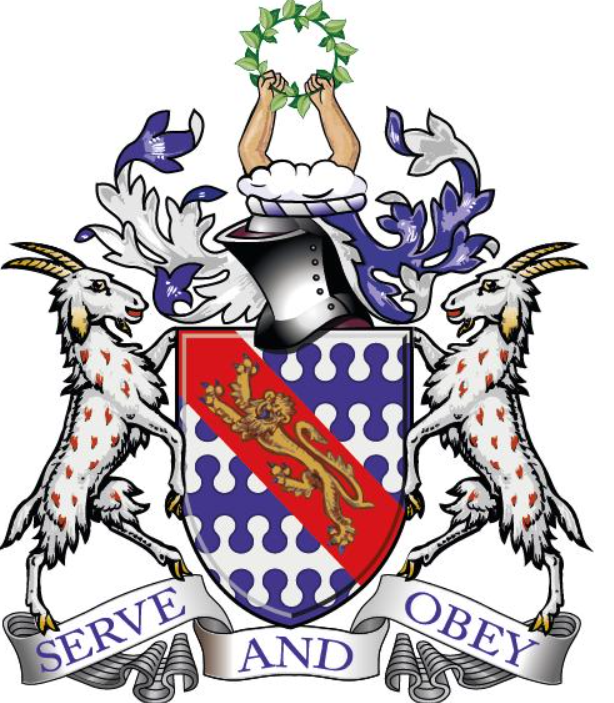
- Coat of arms of the Haberdashers' Company

Location
- Monmouth; Wales
- Coordinates: 51.8115°N 2.7114°W

Information
- Motto: Serve and Obey
- Established: 2024; 2 years ago
- Founder: William Jones
- Head teacher: Melvyn Roffe
- Gender: Mixed
- Age: 3 to 18
- Enrollment: 935
- Colour
- Website: www.habsmonmouth.org

Haberdashers' Monmouth School is a co-educational public school (independent boarding and day school) in Monmouth, Wales for pupils aged 3-18. It was formed in 2024 by the merger of Haberdashers' Monmouth School for Girls and Monmouth School for Boys.

== History ==
In June 2022, the Haberdashers began a consultation on proposals to merge the Boys and Girls schools, making them fully coeducational. The combined new school was officially opened in October 2024 by the Duke of Edinburgh. In December 2024, the school was visited by Jimmy Choo, who hosted two workshops for the pupils. Choo is the schools Patron of Fashion, Design, and Textiles. In February 2025, the Haberdashers' Company announced the appointment of Melvyn Roffe as the school's new head, effective from August 2025.

== Headmasters ==
- 2024-2025 - Simon Dorman
- 2025 - Melvyn Roffe

== See also ==
- Monmouth School
- Monmouth School for Girls
