= Peter Hearne =

Peter Ambrose Hearne FREng (14 November 1927 – 24 January 2014) was a British engineer, who developed a lot of the technology for head-up displays (HUD). He was Chairman of GEC Avionics.

== Early life ==
He was born in Sunderland.

He attended the Loughborough College of Technology (now Loughborough University) where he studied Aeronautical Engineering, and Cranfield Institute of Technology (now Cranfield University) from 1947.

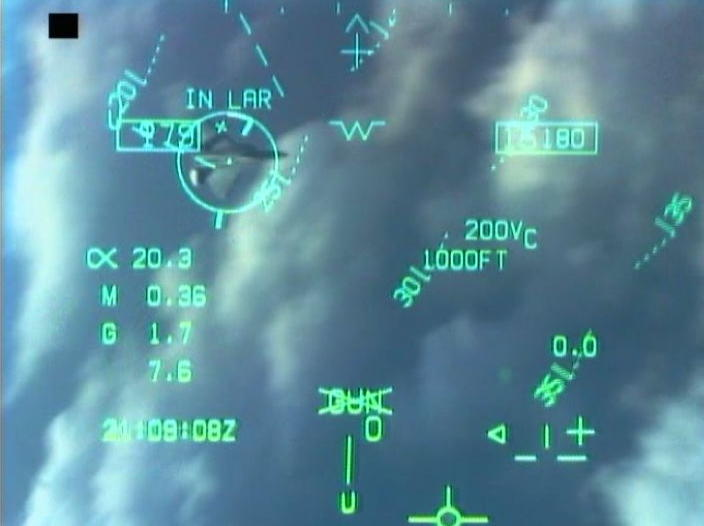
Head-up display on an F-18

== Career ==
He joined BOAC in 1949 and BEA in 1954, where he worked as an aerodynamicist.

=== GEC Avionics ===
He became deputy general manager of Marconi Avionics in 1960. He became general manager in 1966.

== Personal life ==
He married in April 1952 and had three sons; his wife was the secretary of the technical director of BOAC. He lived at Wateringbury. He enjoyed gliding. He died in 2014.

Business positions
Preceded by	Chairman of GEC Avionics; 1992-1994	Succeeded by
Preceded by	General Manager of GEC Avionics; 1966-1987	Succeeded by
Professional and academic associations
Preceded by Rhys Probert	President of the Royal Aeronautical Society; 1980-1981	Succeeded by
