= Katrina Jacks =

Welsh rower and chemical engineering graduate

Katrina Jacks (c. 1986 in Monmouth, Wales – 16 May 2010 in Lake Titicaca, Peru), was a Welsh rower and chemical engineering graduate.

== Biography ==
Jacks was born in Monmouth, the second child and first daughter to General Practitioners Alasdair and Susanna. She had an older brother and a younger sister.

=== Education ===
Jacks went to Haberdashers' Monmouth School for Girls and attended Imperial College, London, graduating with a first class degree in chemical engineering.

=== Competitive rowing ===
Jacks won a number of gold medals at the National Schools Championships, and represented Great Britain at under-16 level for two consecutive years. She was part of the Welsh eight at the 2006 Commonwealth Rowing Championships at Strathclyde Park in Motherwell, Scotland, winning silver with the Welsh team.

=== Death ===
Due to start a job with an engineering consultancy company in summer 2010, Jacks took a gap year in South America from 2009 to improve her Spanish. First volunteering at an orphanage in Ecuador, she then trekked along the Inca Trail to Machu Picchu, before travelling to Lake Titicaca in Peru, the world's highest navigable lake at a height of 3,827 metres (12,556 ft). Jacks died of an apparent case of altitude sickness, which affects human beings above 2,400 metres (7,900 ft), on 16 May 2010. Her body was returned to Wales for burial in late May 2010.
