= Monmouth School =

Public school in Monmouth, Wales

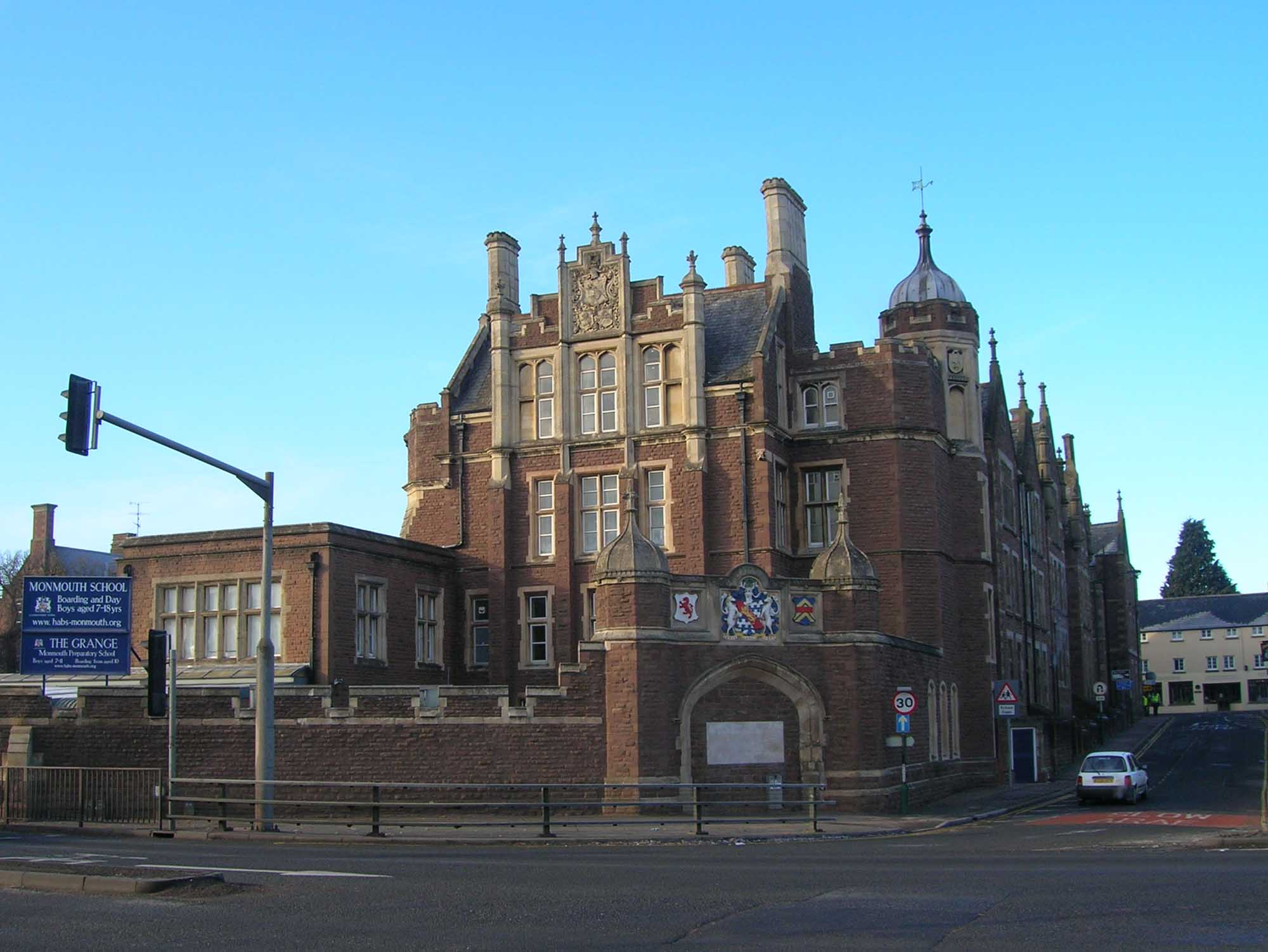
- School House, designed by Henry Stock in the late Victorian era

Location
- Monmouth, NP25 3XP; Wales; 51.8117°N 2.7110°W

Information
- Type: Public school Independent; Boarding and day
- Motto: Serve and Obey
- Religious affiliation: Protestant
- Established: 1614; 412 years ago
- Founder: William Jones
- Local authority: Monmouthshire
- Department for Education URN: 402007 Tables
- Headmaster: Simon Dorman
- Gender: Boys
- Age: 11 to 18
- Enrolment: 650
- Colours: Gold, chocolate and blue
- Alumni: Old Monmothians
- Website: www.habs-monmouth.org

Monmouth School was a public (independent) boarding and day school for boys in Monmouth, Wales.

Founded in 1614 with an endowment from William Jones, a successful cloth merchant and trader in Elizabethan times, Monmouth School was run as a trust, the William Jones's Schools Foundation, by the Worshipful Company of Haberdashers, one of the Great Twelve City Livery Companies, and had close links with its sister school, Haberdashers' Monmouth School for Girls. In 2018, the Haberdashers' Company renamed its group of schools in the town, the Monmouth Schools, and made corresponding changes to the names of the boys' and girls' schools. Further changes were initiated in June 2022, when the Haberdashers opened a consultation on merging the school with the girls' school in the town to create a fully co-educational establishment. In October 2024 the amalgamated schools were relaunched as Haberdashers' Monmouth School.

The school is situated on the eastern edge of the border town of Monmouth, adjacent to the River Wye. Nothing of its original buildings from the 17th century remains as the school was completely rebuilt in the mid to late-19th century. Later developments have included the Science Block (1981–84) and the William Jones Building of the early 21st century (2014). In 2014, the quatercentenary of the school's foundation was celebrated with a service at St Paul's Cathedral.

Established originally as a grammar school, by the early 1870s Monmouth was a member of the newly-formed Headmasters' Conference and had acquired the status of a public school. Between 1946 and 1976 it joined the direct-grant scheme, returning to full independence from 1976. A member of the Headmasters' and Headmistresses' Conference, the school's roll numbered approximately 650 pupils. The fees as at 2024, the last year of operation as a single-sex school, were £25,245 for day pupils, and £48,702 for boarders. The William Jones's Schools Foundation, which funds the Monmouth Schools on behalf of the Haberdashers’ Company, recorded an income of £20.5M against an expenditure of £24.0M in its accounts for 2020.

== History ==
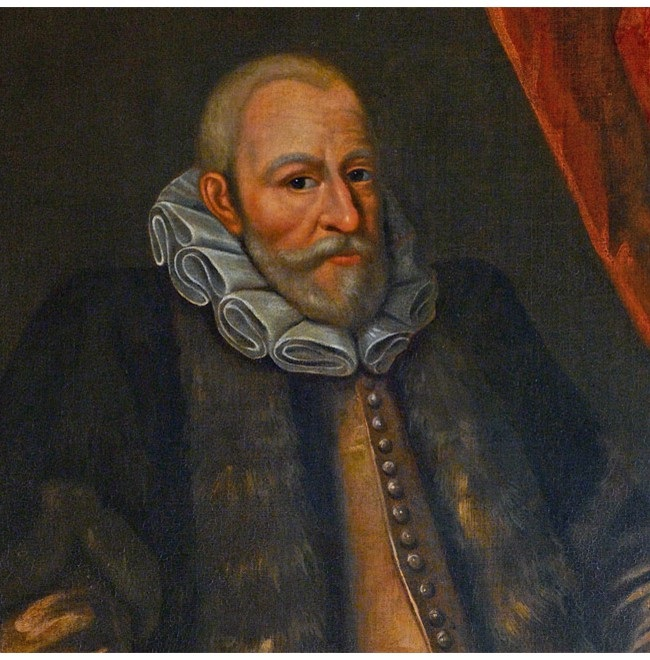
William Jones, the school's benefactor

=== Years of foundation: 1613–1616 ===
In 1613, William Jones, a prosperous merchant and prominent haberdasher, gave the Haberdashers’ Company £6,000, with a further bequest of £3,000 in his will after his death in 1615, to "ordaine a Preacher, a Free-School and Almes-houses for twenty poor and old distressed people, as blind and lame, as it shall seem best to them, of the Towne of Monmouth, where it shall be bestowed". His £9,000 in 1615 is equivalent to £2,009,795 in 2025.

Jones was born at Newland, Gloucestershire and brought up in Monmouth, leaving to make his fortune as a City merchant engaged in cloth trading with the Continent. (Note: W. J. Townsend Collins, in his anthology Monmouthshire Writers, records the traditional story of Jones being forced to leave Monmouth as a youth when unable to settle a debt of ten groats.) Grateful to his livery company's support throughout his career, the motivation for his bequest appears both philanthropic and evangelical; the county of Monmouth in the early 17th century still retained a significant Catholic presence as local historian Keith Kissack noted: "the priority given to the preacher illustrates [Jones's] concern to convert an area in the Marches which was still, when the school opened in 1614, strongly recusant". (Note: John Gwynfor Jones, in his essay Language, Literature and Education in the third volume of the Gwent County History, describes Jones as "puritanically inclined".) The order for the establishment of the school was made, retrospectively by James I in 1616 and decreed "for ever in the town of Monmouth, one almshouse and one free grammar school".

The Haberdashers' Company purchased four fields in the sum of £100 for the Monmouth School site, receiving permission on behalf of Jones by royal decree in 1614 for this charitable purchase as required under the statute of Mortmain. By Jones's death at Hamburg in 1615, the almshouses, and the schoolroom and headmaster's house had been completed, although nothing now remains of the original school buildings.

The remainder of Jones's considerable bequest was used to purchase the manor of Hatcham and surrounding land at New Cross in Surrey, the rent rolls funding the salaries and running costs associated with the school, as well as paying pensions to the almshouse residents.

The first headmaster was the Revd John Owen, M.A. of Queens' College, Cambridge, appointed on a salary of £60 per annum. (Note: Archdeacon Coxe records slightly different rates in his An Historical Tour in Monmouthshire, published in 1801. Coxe notes that the master received, "a house with a salary of £90 a year; to the usher, a salary of £45 per year with a house; and to a lecturer, for the purpose of inspecting the almshouses, reading prayers and preaching a weekly sermon, an excellent house and garden, with a salary of £105 a year".) Neither Owen, nor many of his 17th and 18th-century successors, lasted very long unlike the school day which ran from 7–11 a.m., followed by an afternoon session from 1.30–5.00 p.m.

=== Years of uncertainty: 1617–1799 ===
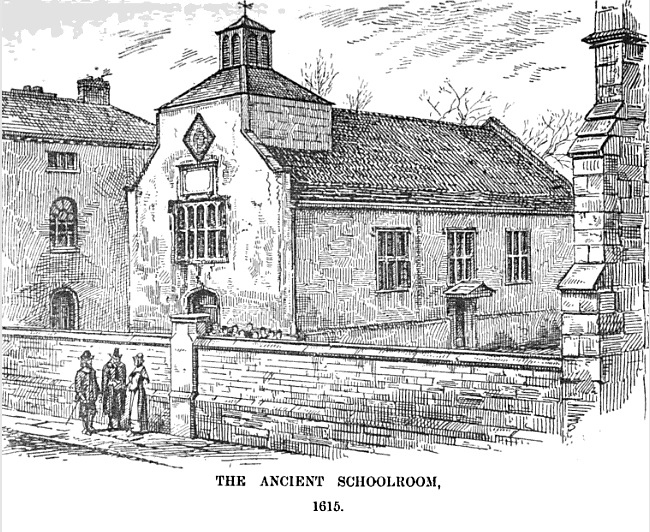
The 17th-century school buildings

The mid-twentieth century school historian, Harold A. Ward, described its early history as "the precarious years". Ongoing religious controversy, exacerbated during the English Civil War, made the town a divided and uncertain setting for Monmouth School. Divisions between staff, and the financial instability, and remoteness, of its City Haberdasher patrons, who were compelled to make substantial loans to the Parliamentary Government that remained unpaid for decades and then also required to finance the rebuilding of their livery hall which was destroyed during the Great Fire of London, contributed to internal weaknesses. These difficulties continued well into the 18th century, and at one point, during the headship of the "morose and tyrannical" John Crowe, who was removed from his post after becoming insane, the school roll fell to just three boys. A source for information regarding the school in the mid-17th century is the diary of the school's usher, More Pye. The diary, extracts from which were published in the Monmouthshire Beacon in 1859 but which is now lost, records Pye's experiences in great detail from the date of his appointment in 1646 until his resignation in 1652. An example is Pye's entry for February 18, 1647; "Pd (paid) 6d ffor (for) wormeseedes and triacle for ye boys". A less parochial entry for November 11, 1647, records Pye's monarchist sympathies, "Ye King's Magy (Majesty) made an escape from Hampton Court, out of ye Armye's power. Vivat, vivat in aeternum". (Note: Placed under house arrest at Hampton Court, Charles I escaped on the night of 11 November 1647. He was quickly recaptured, and imprisoned at Carisbrooke Castle on the Isle of Wight.)

=== Years of controversy: 1800–1850 ===
Ward described the early 19th-century period of Monmouth School's history as years of "controversy". These focused mainly on three issues; relations between the school and the town, relations between the school, the town and the Haberdashers' Company and the Court of Chancery, which together were responsible for the school's funding and oversight, and attempts to expand the school's curriculum beyond the traditional study of Latin and Greek. The first issue saw the school perceived as part of the faction of the Dukes of Beaufort, premier county landowners, and the directors of the town's governance from their regional base at Troy House. Early 19th-century Monmouth had a strong Radical tradition led by burgesses such as Thomas Thackwell, and fuelled by the liberal positions held by local newspapers, the Monmouthshire Beacon and the Monmouthshire Merlin. The school's leadership was perceived in the town to be too close to the Beauforts, and Thackwell ran an almost fifty-year campaign against their attempts to defend the established order. The second controversy related to the governance of the school and another long campaign of attrition saw the School Lecturer lose responsibility for preparing its annual report, this being transferred by the Court of Chancery to a Board of Visitors. The last area of conflict arose between the school's leadership, which wanted to maintain the tradition of a curriculum that involved the study solely of Latin and Greek, and the Court and the Haberdashers' Company which sought to expand teaching to subjects such as writing and arithmetic. In a damming report in 1827 they condemned "the present masters, though so liberally paid, and having so little to do, consider themselves engaged only to teach Latin and Greek. A school teaching those branches of learning only will never be useful to a place of such confined population as Monmouth". Reforms introduced by John Oakley Hill in 1852, saw the establishment of Upper and Lower Schools, the former continuing to provide a classical education, while the latter had a curriculum focused on writing and arithmetic. Archdeacon Coxe, who undertook extensive tours of Wales at the end of the 18th and in the early 19th century accompanied by his patron and friend, Sir Richard Colt Hoare, recorded his impressions of the school in the second volume of An Historical tour in Monmouthshire, published in 1801. Describing the school as enjoying "a high reputation under the care of (the headmaster) the Revd John Powell", Coxe retells the mythical story of the school's establishment and records a "portrait of the founder, habited in the costume of the age of King James the First, with an inscription 'Walter William Jones, haberdasher and merchant of London etc.' is preserved in the school room".

=== Years of expansion: 1851–1913 ===
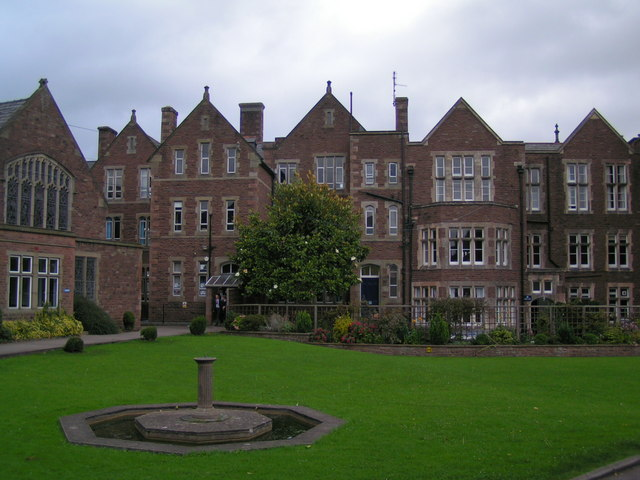
The School Close with the memorial sundial to G. H. Sutherland, Head of School, who drowned in the River Wye in 1921

In the early 1850s the Court of Chancery insisted on the appointment of an external examiner. His report of 1852 was not encouraging; "many of the boys appear so ignorant as to be a disgrace to their parents, still more than to their teachers". If the academic outlook remained bleak, the financial position of the school was transformed in this period. The sale of part of the New Cross estate to railway developers, and the vastly increased rents accruing from the development and expansion of London saw the Haberdashers' fortunes dramatically increase. The availability of funds led to the complete rebuilding of the school on its original site between 1864, the school's 250th anniversary, and the end of the century. Monmouth School's expansion was undertaken during the long incumbency of the Revd Charles Manley Roberts, headmaster for 32 years from 1859 to 1892. During Roberts's time Monmouth became an early member of the prestigious Headmasters' Conference (established by the Revd Edward Thring of Uppingham in 1869), a mark of its increasing reputation and status as a public school. (Note: Manley Roberts' desire to enhance the reputation and status of the school was circumscribed by a traditional snobbery against education in Wales. Siân Rhiannon Williams, in her essay Education and Literacy in the fourth volume of the Gwent County History, notes, "sons of the Monmouthshire gentry were educated in the public schools of England, a tradition which contributed to Monmouth School's difficulty in attracting even the highest rankings of the local professional classes". An inspector appointed by the Haberdashers' Co. to enquire into the issue in 1870 reported that: "The sons of professional men in the neighbourhood hardly ever attend, an objection being felt by their parents to the lower class of boys in the School".) The school's reputation for sporting prowess also rose, its rugby teams and rowers enjoying particular success. As a result of rising revenues from rents and investments, by the mid-19th century, Monmouth's endowment was one of largest of any school in England and Wales. (Note: Sir Joseph Bradney, in his monumental history of the county, A History of Monmouthshire from the Coming of the Normans into Wales down to the Present Time, records the school's income as £780 per year in 1829, £1,324 p/a by 1853 and rising to over £10,000 per annum by 1891.) To use the resulting surpluses, the original foundation was reorganised in 1891 to support a new girls’ school and an elementary school in the town, as well as a boys' grammar school West Monmouth School in Pontypool. As importantly for the school's development, the rule that limited applications to boys from Monmouthshire and the neighbouring counties was set aside, and applications were opened to the entirety of Wales and England.

=== Years of war: 1914–1945 ===
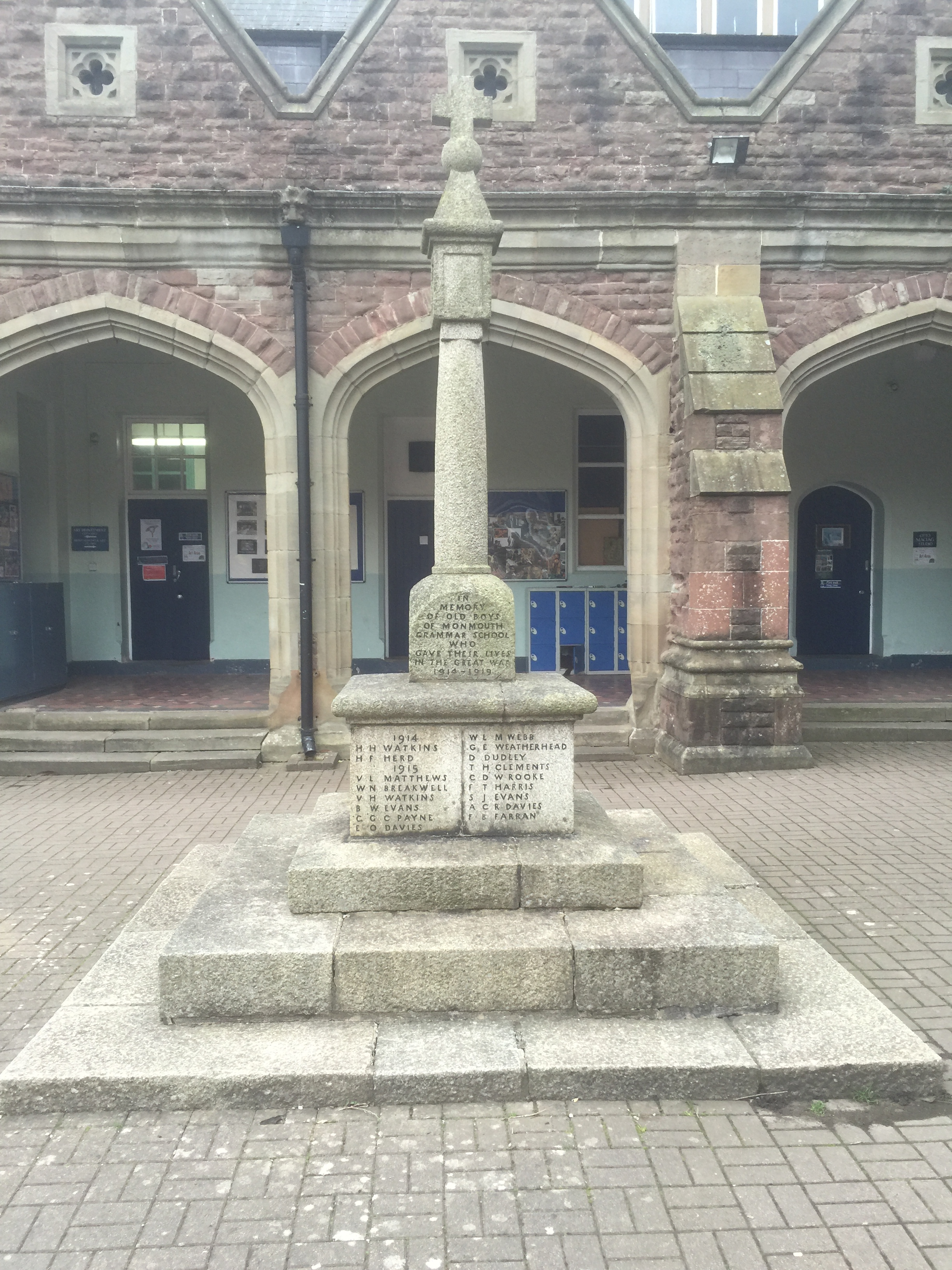
The war memorial, unveiled in 1921 by Old Monmothian Capt. Angus Buchanan

Monmouth School's Combined Cadet Force was reportedly the last CCF in Great Britain to change its uniform to khaki from the traditional blue at the outbreak of war in August 1914. The Great War brought the award of the school's only Victoria Cross, conferred upon Captain Angus Buchanan in 1916 for his conspicuous bravery during the Mesopotamian campaign. (Note: Other decorations awarded to pupils of the school during the World Wars included 32 Military Crosses, 11 Distinguished Service Orders and 8 Distinguished Flying Crosses, Distinguished Flying Medals and Air Force Medals.) Blinded by a bullet to the head the following year, he returned to Monmouthshire and practiced as a solicitor in Coleford, unveiling the school's war memorial in 1921. In total, seventy-six Monmouth old boys were killed on active service during World War I. The school's Bricknell Library, established in 1921, commemorates one of them, Ernest Thomas Samuel Bricknell, who died in October 1916 from wounds received in action at the Battle of the Somme. (Note: A Second lieutenant in the South Wales Borderers Bricknell died of his wounds on 20 October 1916, aged 20. He is buried at the Caterpillar Valley Cemetery in north eastern France.)

Further loss of life occurred in 1921, when the Head of School, G. H. Sutherland, drowned in the River Wye during a rowing match between Monmouth and Hereford Cathedral Schools: Sutherland is commemorated on the sundial in the school cloister. The Second World War added the names of a further sixty-one Old Monmothians to the lists of the dead inscribed on its war memorial. During the War, Monmouth School hosted the entire school and staff from King Edward VI Grammar School, Birmingham, who were evacuated following the Luftwaffe's bombing of the Midlands.

=== Recent years: 1946–2024 ===
Internal conflict within the school's management continued in the mid-twentieth century, with the governors sacking two headmasters within three years. This led to the school's expulsion from the Headmasters' Conference, and to that body's advising against any of its members applying for the vacant headship. This impasse was resolved in 1959, with the appointment of Robert Glover. Reorganisation of the Haberdashers' endowments also occurred at this time. The elementary school, founded with Haberdashers' funds in 1891, was transferred to Monmouthshire County Council control in 1940 with West Monmouth School at Pontypool following in 1955. This left the William Jones's Schools Foundation responsible for Monmouth School and Haberdashers' Monmouth School for Girls – also known as HMSG – both of which joined the Direct-Grant scheme in 1946.

Another significant development for the school's location was the building of the A40, which "severed (Monmouth) ruthlessly from the river on which in the past it had depended" and cut off the school from its historic frontage onto the River Wye. This led to the permanent closure of the school's ceremonial entrance, the Wye Bridge Gate, constructed by Henry Stock in the 1890s. The direct impact on the school was perhaps less significant, Ward had recorded an early comment on the entrance "that ancient gate which never opened is but thrice a year on notable occasions, such as when the coal cart comes".

In 1976, with the ending of the Direct-Grant system, the school returned to full independence. Having argued strongly against the ending of the government grant system, the headmaster at the time, Robert Glover, gave a warning as to the likely consequences, "if direct grant goes, the school which has served the boys of Monmouth for four hundred years, will suddenly become for many families financially prohibitive". In response, a committee of the Old Monmothian Club, headed by Lord Brecon and Sir Derek (later Lord) Ezra launched a campaign to raise funding for scholarships which amassed £100,000 in ten weeks. During his tenure Glover also secured re-admittance to the Headmasters' Conference. To mark the school's four-hundredth anniversary a service of thanksgiving was held at St. Paul's Cathedral, on 19 March 2014, attended by some 2,200 pupils and staff from the school and from Haberdashers' Monmouth School for Girls, as well as Haberdashers and friends of the Schools.

In 2018, the Haberdashers' Company rebranded its group of schools in the town as Haberdashers Monmouth Schools and renamed the senior schools as Monmouth School for Boys and Monmouth School for Girls respectively. In its most recent accounts, published in 2020, the William Jones's Schools Foundation, which funds the Monmouth group of schools on behalf of the Haberdashers’ Company, recorded an expenditure of £24.0M against an income of £20.5M. In June 2022, the Haberdashers began consultation on proposals to merge the Boys and Girls schools, making them fully coeducational. In October 2024 the amalgamated schools were relaunched as Haberdashers' Monmouth School'.

== Histories of the school ==
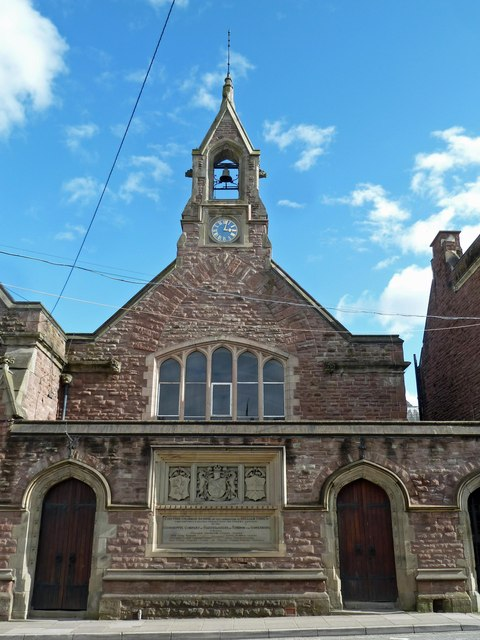
The library, the former Victorian “Big School”

The Monmouthshire antiquarian Charles Heath described the traditional, and almost certainly inaccurate, story of the school's foundation in his Accounts of the Ancient and Present State of the Town of Monmouth, published in 1804. Heath records that William Jones, now established as a successful and wealthy merchant, returned to his home town of Newland disguised as a beggar. Receiving a hostile reception, he travelled to Monmouth, where he was more warmly received and where, as a consequence, he funded the construction of the school and associated almshouses. The story is taken from an earlier oral tradition, also recorded in Archdeacon Coxe's An Historical Tour in Monmouthshire, published three years earlier. In 1899, the Revd William M. Warlow published his History of the Charities of William Jones at Monmouth and Newland. His fellow clergyman and master, the Revd K. M. Pitt wrote a more focused account, Monmouth School in the 1860s. H. A. Ward published Monmouth School: 1614–1964: An Outline History to commemorate the school's 350th anniversary. In 1995, Keith Kissack published his history, Monmouth School and Monmouth: 1614–1995. In 2014, in celebration of the school's quatercentenary, two masters at the school, Stephen Edwards, who wrote the text, and Keith Moseley, who took the photographs, published a new history, Monmouth School: The First 400 Years.

== Buildings ==
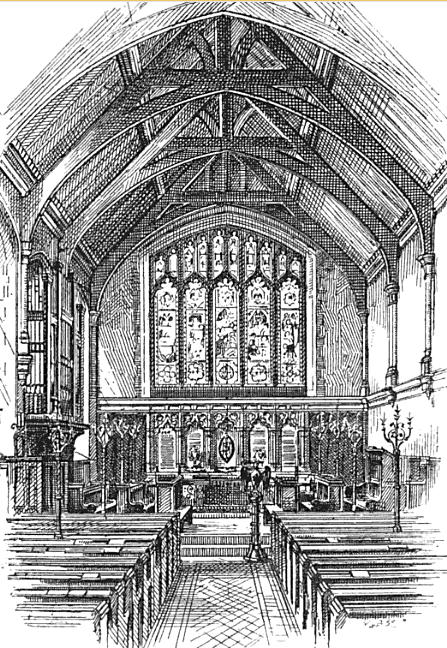
Interior of Monmouth School Chapel, 1865

William Jones's original legacy provided for a schoolroom, on the site of the present chapel, houses for the headmaster and Lecturer, and almshouses segregated by sex. A painting by John A. Evans, of later date and purchased on behalf of the school by the then headmaster Lionel James in 1921, shows the buildings and is titled The Old School Room. Built A.D. 1614. Pulled down to make room for the present school room, 1865. Nothing of these old buildings remains. The local writer and artist Fred Hando records that the bell, which hung above the schoolroom, was cast by the Evans Foundry at Chepstow in 1716.

In 1864 the Haberdashers undertook a substantial rebuilding of the school. Funded by the rising fortunes of Jones's bequest on the back of the Victorian expansion of London, the work was mostly undertaken by William Snooke and Henry Stock, of the firm Snooke & Stock, surveyors to the Haberdashers' Company. (Note: John B. Hiling, in his study The Architecture of Wales: From the first to the twenty-first century, omits mention of Henry Stock's contribution, ascribing the work solely to "W. Snoke" (sic).) Snooke built the chapel, two schoolrooms and a classroom in 1864–65, followed in the 1870s by the library, Headmaster's House and the buildings which now form Monmouth House and Hereford House; these buildings are all Grade II-listed. The Monmouth Alms Houses, on Almshouse Street, were rebuilt by James Bunstone Bunning in 1842, and redeveloped by William Burns in 1895–96. They now form part of the school and incorporate a large inscription panel describing the benefactions of Jones's Foundation. The almshouses are also Grade II-listed. The chapel was further extended in 1875. Snooke's work was not universally praised; a report from the School's Commissioner commenting, "the architect has arranged the buildings in a most inconvenient manner, and the ventilation is deficient." School House, with its ceremonial arched entrance and coat of arms facing the Wye Bridge, and the adjacent Technology Block, were designed by Henry Stock in 1894–95. They became Grade II-listed buildings as of 8 October 2005. The style of the School House Block mirrors that of the main block of Haberdashers' Monmouth School for Girls, which Stock designed at the same time. The war memorial was dedicated in 1921, with Capt. Angus Buchanan attending the ceremony: it is a Grade II-listed monument. (Note: The memorial was designed and built by Alfred William Ursell, a monumental mason from nearby Ross-on-Wye, whose son 2nd Lieut. Victor Ursell attended Monmouth, died at the Second Battle of Arras in May 1917, and whose name is inscribed on the memorial.) To the west of Stock's School House Block, and set into the wall previously facing the Wye and now completely overshadowed by the A40 by-pass, is a pair of wrought iron gates of 18th-century date. They came from Haberdashers' Hall in London which was destroyed during the Blitz in 1941. (Note: The CADW listing gives 1941 as when the gates were installed, although Fred Hando records this as happening in 1961. Hando is supported by the school's historian, Harold A. Ward, who dates their installation to after 1958, when the wall fronting the River Wye was moved back to facilitate the construction of the A40.)

The school's building of greatest architectural merit was Chapel House, which is Grade II*-listed. (Note: Following the 2024 merger, the school consolidated its built estate, and Chapel House was put up for sale in 2026.) The architectural historian John Newman describes the 18th-century building, situated on the Hereford Road away from the main school site, as "the best house in the entire street". More modern developments include the School Hall of 1961, redeveloped in the early 21st century and now the Blake Theatre, the Red Lion Block of the same date and the Science Block of 1981–1984. In 1985–86, two ceramic murals were designed for the chapel by the Polish religious artist Adam Kossowski, a friend and wartime colleague of the school's Head of Art from 1947 to 1978, Otto Maciag. Executed by Maciag, and another art master at the school, Michael Tovey, the murals were dedicated at a service led by the Rt Revd Clifford Wright, Bishop of Monmouth, on 3 October 1987. Bishop Wright described them as "masterpieces of twentieth-century religious art". In November 2008, a £2.3 million sports pavilion was completed and opened by the former British Lions player and Welsh captain, Eddie Butler, an Old Monmothian. It was designed by the architects Buttress Fuller Alsop Williams. In 2011, the school began the Heart Project. This led to the sale of some outlying sites, such as St James's House, and the re-organisation of others, to assist in the raising of funds for the redevelopment of the main school site. Further funds came from the Haberdashers' Company, and the first phase was completed with the rebuilding of the Red Lion Block, renamed the William Jones Building.

== The school in the 21st century ==
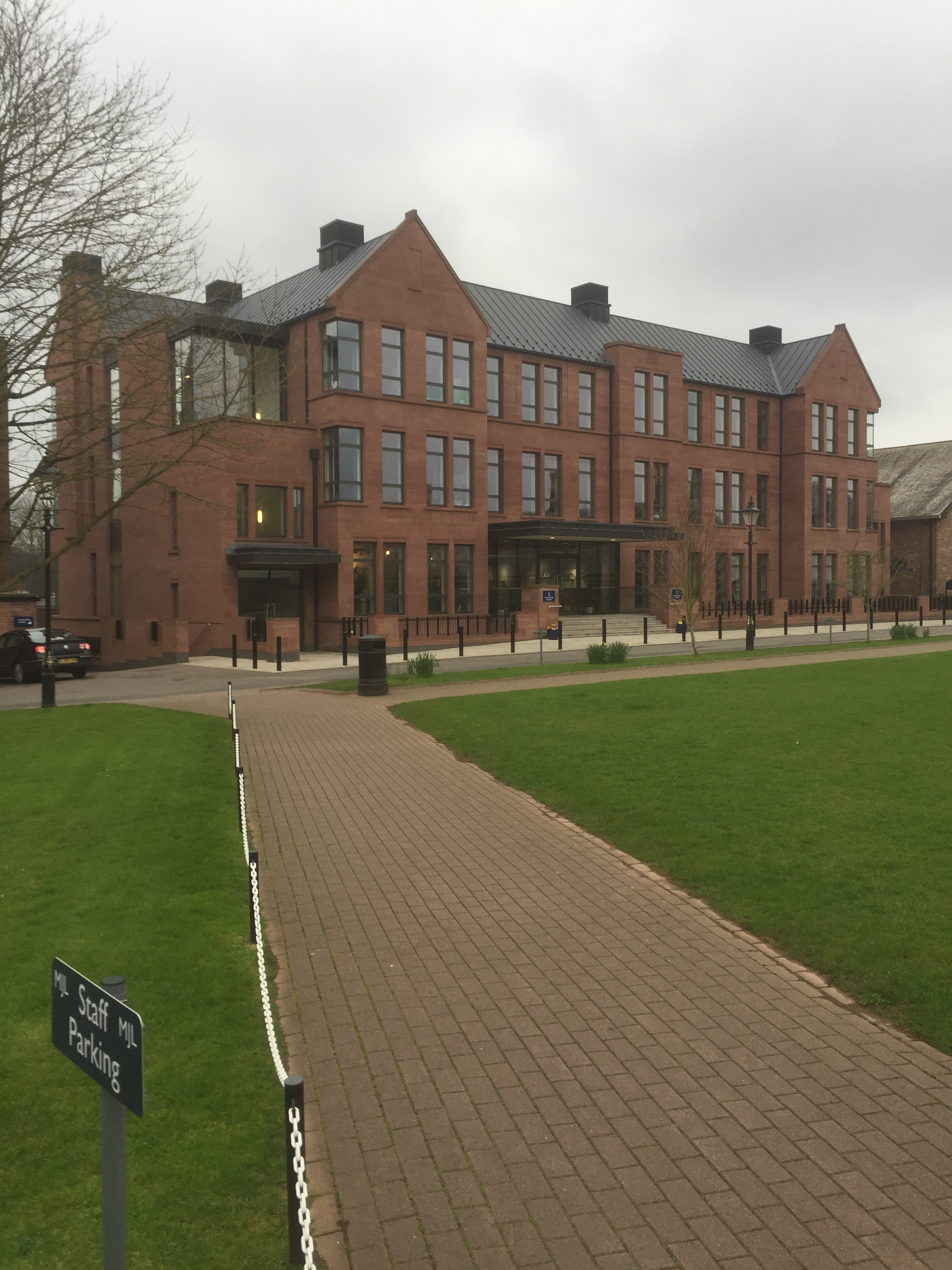
The William Jones Building

With over 700 pupils, the school offered boarding and day places as well as preparatory departments. A range of GCSE, A and AS-level subjects were available. Tatler's (2020) Schools Guide noted its strong academic performance. The school charges fees for attendance; for January 2025, the annual fees were: £25,245 for day pupils, and £48,702 for boarders. The school operated a substantial bursary programme. In September 2018, Monmouth School was renamed Monmouth School for Boys after a merger of all five Haberdashers' Company Schools in Monmouth. This operated under the name Haberdashers' Monmouth Schools until the further amalgamation in 2024, and comprised: Monmouth School for Boys (formerly Monmouth School), Monmouth School for Girls (formerly Haberdashers' Monmouth School for Girls or HMSG), Monmouth School Boys' Prep (formerly The Grange), Monmouth School Girls' Prep (formerly Inglefield House) and Monmouth Schools Pre-Prep and Nursery (formerly Agincourt School).

=== Houses ===
There were three age-divisions in the school; Lower (forms I and II) Middle (forms III, IV, and V) and Sixth form (forms VI.1 and VI.2). Within these divisions, the school operated a House system. As of December 2022, the houses were:

- Monnow House, the lower school boarding house;
- Wye and Dean Houses, the lower school day houses;
- Severn House, Town House, Monmouth House and Hereford House, the middle school day houses;
- New House, Weirhead House, and School House, the middle school boarding houses;
- Tudor, Glendower, and Buchanan Houses, which comprised the sixth form centre and VI.2 boarding.

=== Extra-curricular activities ===
The school had its own theatre, The Blake, opened in 2004. Funded by Bob Blake, a former pupil, it was used as a venue for performances by both the school and the girls' school, as well as by external performers. The Glover Music School has an auditorium and teaching and practice rooms. (Note: The music school honours Robert Finlay Glover, headmaster from 1959-1977, and was part-funded by his daughter, the conductor Jane Glover.) The strong musical tradition owed much to Michael Eveleigh, Director of Music at the school from 1950 to 1986, and his successors, there having been only five directors of music since the Second World War. Other extra-curricular activities included overseas expeditions, music and drama events as well as a newspaper, The Lion, a creative writing pamphlet, The Lion's Tale, The Mon-Mouth, a bi-weekly, student-run newspaper and an annual magazine, The Monmothian, first published in 1882. The Combined Cadet Force, founded in 1904, which has both Army and RAF sections, is operated in collaboration with HMSG.

=== Sport ===
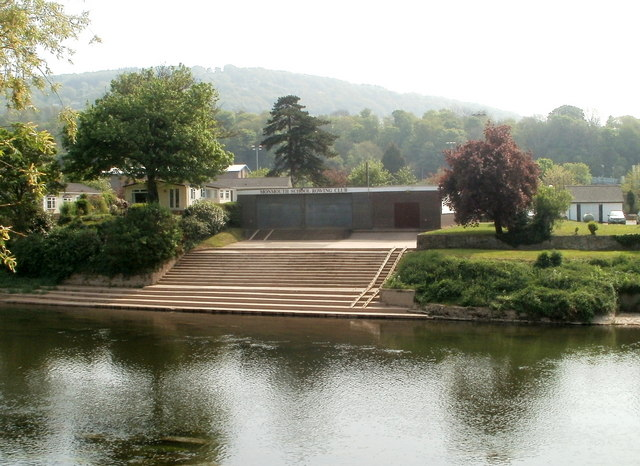
Monmouth School boathouse

The school maintained a notable sporting tradition, with a high number of successful sportsmen amongst its alumni. Its main sports were rugby, rowing and cricket. The school's rowing club, affiliated to British Rowing (boat code MNS), produced three championship crews at the 1988, 2007 and 2009 British Rowing Championships. Facilities included a boathouse, a sports complex which houses a six-lane swimming pool, indoor facilities including a weights and fitness suite, tennis courts, and a full size astroturf pitch. The Hitchcock Sports Pavilion, completed in 2008, stands beside the playing fields, on the other side of the Wye from the school's main site. In addition to rugby, rowing and cricket, the school offered a range of other sports including soccer, tennis, basketball, golf, cross-country, athletics, swimming, water polo, canoeing and squash.

=== Other ===
The school had an alumni society, the Old Monmothian Club, founded in 1886. In June 2009, the school paid out £150,000 to settle a landmark pensions rights case brought by female catering and support staff who claimed that, as part-time workers, they had been unjustly excluded from the school pension scheme.

== Headmasters ==
- 1615 John Owen
- 1617 Humfrey Crewys
- 1639 Nathaniel Taynton
- 1657 Robert Brabourne
- 1658 Robert Frampton
- 1663 John Harmer
- 1663 Charles Hoole
- 1664 William Morris
- 1672 Thomas Bassett
- 1687 Thomas Wright
- 1691 Thomas Bassett (restored)
- 1713 Andrew Cuthbert
- 1723 James Birt
- 1738 Baynham Barnes
- 1758 John Crowe
- 1780 Thomas Prosser
- 1793 John Powell
- 1823 William Jones
- 1828 John Oakley Hill
- 1832 George Monnington
- 1844 John Dundas Watherston
- 1859 Charles Manley Roberts
- 1891 Edward Hugh Culley (Note: Edward Culley, a mathematician and classics scholar, was the first headmaster to be appointed since the establishment of the school who was not in holy orders. Nevertheless, his candidacy enjoyed considerable ecclesiastical support. The South Wales Daily News, in its report of his appointment in 1891, noted that his referees included the Bishop of Chester, the Bishop of Liverpool and the Dean of St Asaph, as well as the Master of Balliol.)
- 1906 Lionel James
- 1928 Christopher Fairfax Scott
- 1937 Wilfred Roy Lewin
- 1941 Noel Chamberlain Elstob
- 1946 Cecil Howard Dunstan Cullingford
- 1956 John Robert Murray Senior
- 1959 Richard H S Hatton (acting)
- 1959 Robert Finlay Glover
- 1977 Nicholas Bomford
- 1982 Rupert Lane
- 1995 Peter Anthony
- 1995 Timothy Haynes
- 2005 Steven Connors
- 2015 Andrew Daniel
- 2020 Simon Dorman

== Notable alumni ==
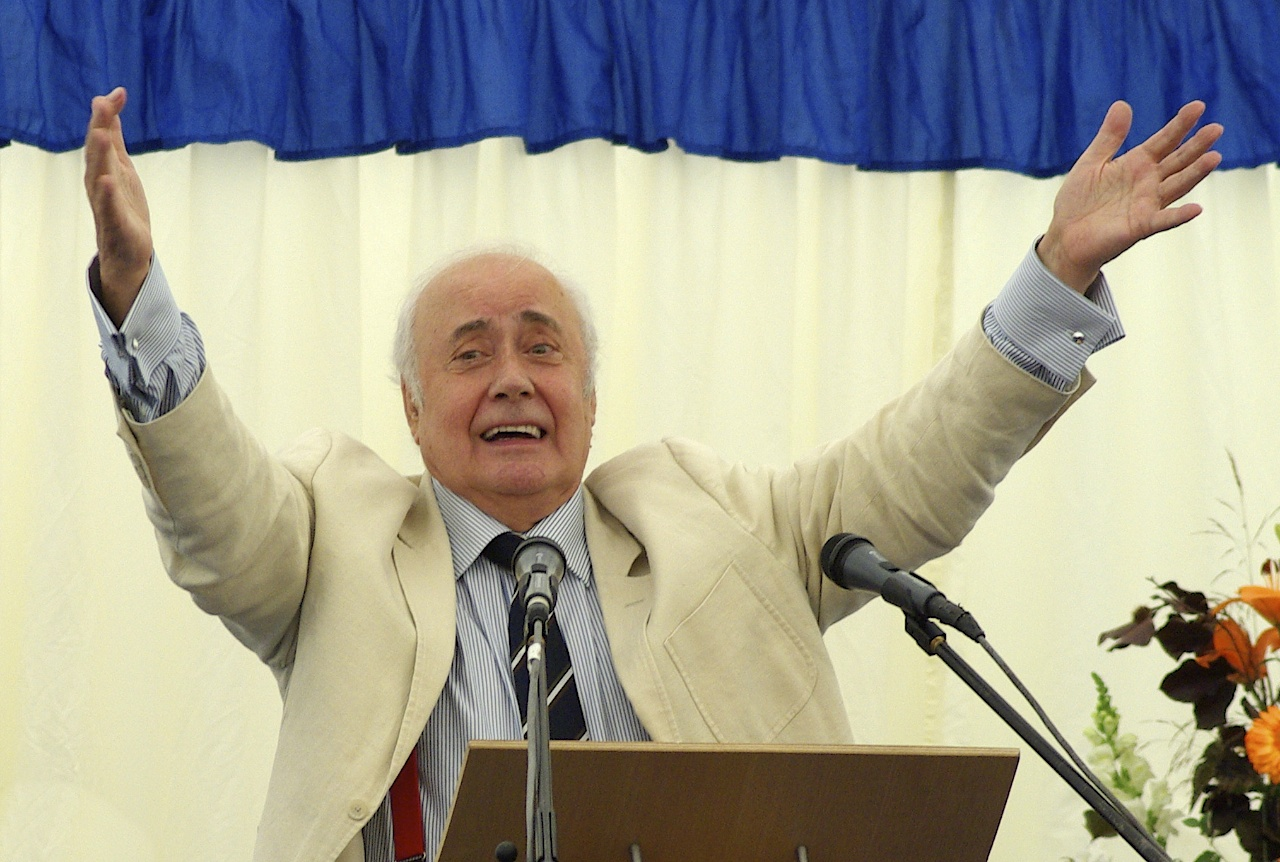
Old Monmothian Victor Spinetti at Monmouth Speech Day, 2009

Historical

- Angus Buchanan VC (1894–1944), soldier and Victoria Cross recipient
- Derek Ezra, Baron Ezra, MBE (1919–2015), Liberal politician and Chairman of the National Coal Board
- Sir Josiah Guest Bt (1785–1852), Whig MP and industrialist
- Jacob Owen (1778–1880), architect
- James Endell Tyler (1789–1851), theologian
- John Vassall (1924–1996), civil servant and spy
- David Thomas Gwynne-Vaughan (1871–1915), botanist and botanopalaeolontologist
- Peter Young DSO MC (1915–1988), soldier and historian who founded The Sealed Knot.

Public life

- Sir John Beddington CMG (born 1945), HMG Chief Scientific Adviser
- Richard Carwardine CMG (born 1947), academic President of Corpus Christi College, Oxford
- Sir Warren East CBE (born 1961), former CEO of Rolls-Royce
- Prof Roy Goodacre FLSW (born 1967), academic Professor of Biological Chemistry University of Liverpool
- Christopher Herbert (born 1944), retired Anglican Bishop of St Albans
- Paul Langford (1945–2015), academic Rector of Lincoln College, Oxford
- David Lewis, Baron Brecon, PC (1905–1976), businessman and Conservative Minister of State for Welsh Affairs
- Colin Moynihan, 4th Baron Moynihan (born 1955), Conservative politician and Olympian
- Frank Owen OBE MP (1905–1979), Liberal politician and journalist
- Clifford Tucker JP (1912–1993), oil company executive, life partner of gay rights campaigner A. E. Dyson

Arts and Entertainment

- Leonard Clark OBE (1905–1981), poet
- Angus McBean (1904–1990), photographer
- Richard Marner (1921–2004), actor
- Grant Nicholas (born 1967), lead singer guitarist with rock band Feeder
- Richard Pearson (1918–2011), actor
- Tom Price (born 1980), actor and comedian
- Victor Spinetti (1933–2012), actor
- Glyn Worsnip (1938–1996), actor and broadcaster

Sports

- Hallam Amos (born 1994), rugby player
- Wayne Barnes OBE (born 1979), rugby union referee
- David Broome CBE (born 1940), showjumper
- Eddie Butler (1957–2022), rugby player / TV commentator
- Jonathan Denning (born 1991), first-class cricketer
- John Gwilliam (1923–2016), rugby player
- Steve James (born 1967), journalist formerly Glamorgan CCC captain
- Keith Jarrett (born 1948), rugby player
- Martin Johnson (1949–2021), sports journalist
- Tom Lucy (born 1988), Team GB rower
- William Marsh (1917–1978), cricketer
- Lewis Oliva (born 1992), Team GB cyclist
- Richard Parks (born 1977), rugby player
- Kyle Tudge (born 1987), minor county cricketer
- Huw Waters (born 1986), cricketer
- Charles Wiggin (born 1950), rower
- Robin Williams MBE (born 1959), rower and coach

== See also ==
- Haberdashers' Monmouth School
- Haberdashers' Monmouth School for Girls
- Worshipful Company of Haberdashers

== Sources ==
- Bradney, Joseph (1991). The Hundred of Skenfrith. A History of Monmouthshire from the Coming of the Normans into Wales down to the Present Time. Vol. 1 Part 1. London: Academy Books. ISBN 1873361092. OCLC 669714197.
- Brodie, Antonia (2001). Directory of British Architects, 1834–1914. Vol. 2 (L–Z). British Architectural Library. ISBN 978-0-826-45514-7.
- Clark, Arthur (1979). The Story of Monmouthshire, Volume 1, From the earliest times to the Civil War. Monmouth, Wales: Monnow Press. ISBN 9780950661810. OCLC 866777550.
- — (1980). The Story of Monmouthshire, Volume 2, From the Civil War to Present Times. Monmouth, Wales: Monnow Press. ISBN 9780950661803. OCLC 503676874.
- Collins, William James Townsend (1945). Monmouthshire Writers: A Literary History and Anthology. Newport: R. H. Johns. OCLC 236089162.
- Coxe, William (1995) [1801]. An Historical Tour of Monmouthshire: Volume 2. Cardiff: Merton Priory Press. ISBN 978-1-8989-3708-1. OCLC 34476778.
- Edwards, Stephen; Moseley, Keith (2014). Monmouth School: The First 400 Years. London: Third Millennium Publishing. ISBN 978-1-906507-91-6.
- Evans, Cyril James Oswald (1953). Monmouthshire: Its History and Topography. Cardiff: William Lewis Printers. OCLC 2415203.
- Eveleigh, Michael (1992). Hitting the Right Note – A Review of Music at Monmouth School 1946–1986. Wimbourne Minster: Dovecote Press. OCLC 863443643.
- Hando, Fred (1964). Monmouth Town Sketch Book. Newport: R. H. Johns. OCLC 30295655.
- Hiling, John B. (2018). The Architecture of Wales: From the First to the Twenty-First Centuries. Cardiff: University of Wales Press. ISBN 978-1-786-83285-6.
- Jones, John Gwynfor (2009). Gray, Madeleine; Morgan, Prys; Griffiths, Ralph A. (eds.). The Making of Monmouthshire, 1536-1780. Gwent County History. Vol. 3. Cardiff: University of Wales Press. ISBN 978-0-7083-2198-0. OCLC 552064875.
- Kissack, Keith (1975). Monmouth: The Making of a County Town. London: Phillimore and Co. ISBN 0-85033-209-5. OCLC 2597663.
- — (1986). Victorian Monmouth. Ledbury: Monmouth Historical and Education Trust. ISBN 0950338621. OCLC 263474571.
- — (1989). The Building of Monmouth. Monmouth: Monmouth Historical & Educational Trust. OCLC 40397291.
- — (1995). Monmouth School and Monmouth 1614–1995. Hereford: Lapridge Publications. OCLC 34886939.
- — (1996). The Lordship, Parish and Borough of Monmouth. Hereford: Lapridge Publications. OCLC 59587626.
- — (2003). Monmouth and its Buildings. Woonton Almeley: Logaston Press. ISBN 978-1-904396-01-7. OCLC 55143853.
- Morris, Rev. N. F. M. (1987). The Murals in Monmouth School Chapel. Monmouth, UK: Boase Press. ISBN 9-780-94812302-3. OCLC 24745623.
- Newman, John (2000). Gwent/Monmouthshire. The Buildings of Wales. London: Penguin. ISBN 0-14-071053-1.
- Twiston Davies, David, ed. (2003). The Daily Telegraph Book of Military Obituaries. London: Bounty Books. ISBN 978-0-7537-1529-1.
- Tyerman, Hugo; Warner, Sydney (1951). Mee, Arthur (ed.). Monmouthshire. The King's England. London: Hodder and Staughton. OCLC 764861.
- Vaughan, C. Maxwell (1975). Pioneers of Welsh Steel: Dowlais to Llanwern. Newport: Starling Press. ISBN 0-903434-08-3. OCLC 2189651.
- Ward, H. A. (1964). Monmouth School: 1614–1964. London: The Haberdashers' Company. OCLC 21955907.
- Williams, Sian Rhiannon (2011). Williams, Chris; Williams, Sian Rhiannon; Griffiths, Ralph A. (eds.). Industrial Monmouthshire, 1780-1914. Gwent County History. Vol. 4. Cardiff: University of Wales Press. ISBN 978-0-7083-2365-6. OCLC 877729915.
