= David Lewis, 1st Baron Brecon =

British businessman and politician (1905-1976)

Baron Brecon in 1958.

David Vivian Penrose Lewis, 1st Baron Brecon PC (14 August 1905 – 10 October 1976) was a Welsh businessman and Conservative politician.

== Background and education ==
Lewis was the son of Alfred William Lewis, of Talybont-on-Usk, Breconshire, and was educated at Monmouth School.

== Political career ==
In December 1957 he was appointed Minister of State for Welsh Affairs by Prime Minister Harold Macmillan, and the following January he was raised to the peerage as Baron Brecon, of Llanfeigan in the County of Brecknock. He was admitted to the Privy Council in 1960 and remained Minister of State for Welsh Affairs until 1964, from 1963 to 1964 under the premiership of Sir Alec Douglas-Home.

== Family ==
Lord Brecon married Mabel Helen, daughter of James McColville, in 1933. They had two daughters. Lady Brecon was a Justice of the Peace for Breconshire and High Sheriff of the county for 1971. In 1964 she was made a CBE. Lord Brecon died in October 1976, aged 71. As he had no sons the title became extinct on his death. Lady Brecon survived her husband by almost thirty years and died in September 2005, aged 96.

== Notes ==
Political offices
New office	Minister of State for Welsh Affairs; 1957–1964	Succeeded by Goronwy Roberts
Peerage of the United Kingdom
New title	Baron Brecon; 1958–1976	Extinct
