= Martin Johnson (writer) =

English sports journalist (1949–2021)

- Born: 23 June 1949
- Died: 13 March 2021 (aged 71)
- Education: Monmouth School

Martin Johnson (23 June 1949 – 13 March 2021) was an English sports journalist who worked as a cricket correspondent of The Independent, sports feature writer at the Daily Telegraph and as a writer for The Sunday Times. Among the sports he covered in addition to cricket were rugby union, boxing, rowing, golf, show jumping and the Olympics.

== Life and career ==
After receiving his education at Monmouth School, Johnson joined the South Wales Argus. He subsequently moved to the Leicester Mercury, before joining The Independent in 1986. According to his Independent obituarist: "Readers were astonished and amused – and some bemused – by a hilarious wise-cracking correspondent with a unique style." Covering the England cricket tour of Australia in 1986-7, following a string of poor performances in the run-up to the first Test, he famously wrote that there were only three things wrong with the English team: "They can’t bat, they can’t bowl and they can’t field." When England went on to comfortably win the Test series, he ended his piece summarising the tour with the pithy: "Right quote, wrong team."

He worked for the Daily Telegraph between 1995 and 2008, and subsequently for The Sunday Times. Though an astute observer of the sports that he covered, he was not renowned as a news-getter, and in consequence was ironically known as "Scoop" by his press colleagues. He was also accident-prone. When sent by the Telegraph to cover a heavyweight boxing bout between Lennox Lewis and Ray Mercer, he arrived at the MGM Grand in Las Vegas to take his seat, only to be told that the fight was actually taking place in New York City on the opposite side of the country.

He wrote of David Gower, the English batsman, that he was "so laid back, he’s almost horizontal"; on Shane Warne’s delivery to dismiss Mike Gatting in 1993: "How anyone can spin a ball the width of Gatting boggles the mind"; on the bowler Angus Fraser running in "like a man who has got his braces caught on the sightcreen" (sic); on Merv Hughes, the Australian bowler, "He swings it both ways through the air (and that’s just his stomach) … his coiffeur appears to have been entrusted to an inebriated sheep shearer somewhere in the outback."

Gower said of him: "Martin was a writer of great skill, and he wrote primarily to entertain himself. He was also fiercely independent and wasn’t afraid to put the boot in." His Telegraph obituarist finished his piece with: "Few men in our business have brought so much joy to so many."

He was a keen golfer. He died on 13 March 2021 at the age of 71 after a long illness.

== Bibliography ==
- "World Cup Cricket '87", with Henry Blofeld, Kingswood Press, 1987, ISBN 978-0434981427.
- "The Ashes 1989", Simon & Schuster Ltd, 1989, ISBN 978-0671653330.
- "Gower: The Autobiography", with David Gower, CollinsWillow, 1992, ISBN 978-0002184137.
- "Can’t Bat, Can’t Bowl, Can’t Field", Willow, 1997, ISBN 978-0002187862.
- "Can I Carry Your Bags?: The Life of a Sports Hack Abroad", Constable, 2015, ISBN 978-1472111937.
