= James Endell Tyler =

The Rev James Endell Tyler B.D. (30 Jan. 1789–5 Oct. 1851) was an Anglican minister, historian, theologian, residentiary canon of St Paul's Cathedral and Rector of St Giles in the Fields church.

== Early life and education ==
Tyler was born in Monmouth in the Welsh Marches on 30 Jan. 1789, was the son of a solicitor named James Tyler. Educated at Monmouth Grammar School he later attended Oriel College Oxford where he was elected Michel scholar at Queen's College while an undergraduate. In 1812, he obtained a fellowship at Oriel and graduated M.A. on 9 Jan. 1813 and B.D. on 17 Dec. 1823 while from 1818 to 1826 he filled the office of tutor at the college. During his time as a tutor at Oriel he held the perpetual curacy of Moreton Pinkney in Northamptonshire.

== Career ==
While at Oriel, Tyler appears to have come into conflict with the followers of John Henry Newman in their efforts to reorder college life. As Vice-Provost he was perceived by some as protecting and even favouring 'young men of family' and defending the tradition of the Gentleman-Commoner in opposition to the efforts of Newman and Thomas Mozeley who were pushing for their model of a 'catholic ethos' for the college. Tyler was apparently perceived by Newman and his followers of being insufficiently decided on the Catholic Question. Indeed Newman, at the time, coined the expression to 'Tylerise' which he suggested meant to stand on two sides of a controverted question at once. It was also was suggested at the time, by Newman's ally Mozeley, that Tyler 'had cared for gold tufts and silk gowns more than for the college generally' and that his 'especial fondness was reserved for the Gentlemen Commoners'. Newman, for his part, was accused by some of attempting to turn Oriel 'into a seminary'. Despite this disagreement, Tyler would go on to be remembered at Oriel College with great popularity and fondness.

In 1826, his preaching attracted the attention of the Prime Minister, Robert Banks Jenkinson, 2nd Earl of Liverpool, who presented him to the living of St. Giles-in-the-Fields, a position then held in the gift of the Crown. In 1827 he married Elizabeth Ann, daughter of George Griffin of Newton House, Monmouth.

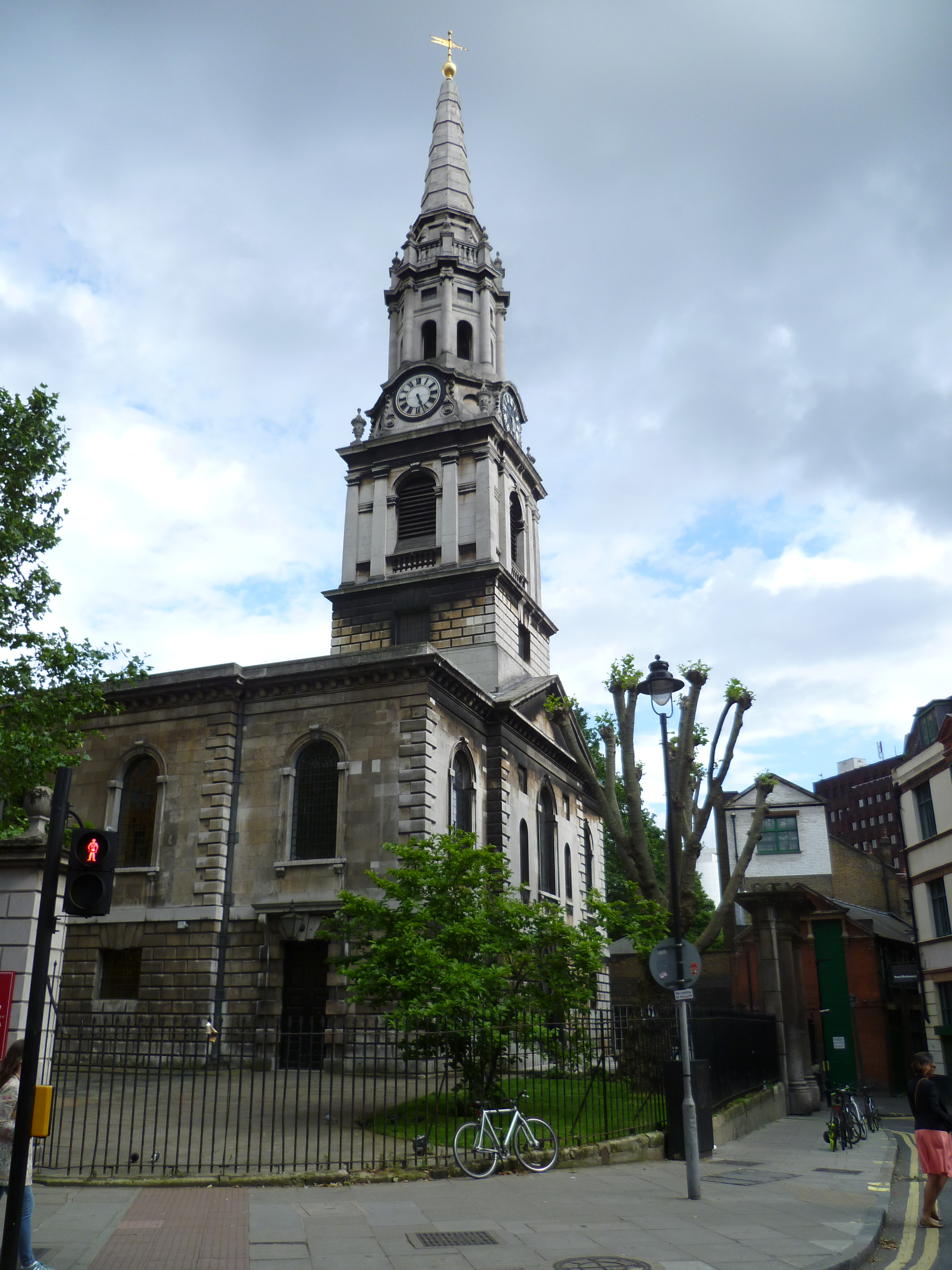
St Giles in the Fields

When Tyler took on the rectory of St Giles in the mid-1820s the parish of St Giles was the scene of scandalous poverty and squalour. It was home to the most notorious slum in England and was described by one writer as being emblematic of 'the lowest conditions under which human life is possible'. Despite these less than promising conditions, Tyler appears to have been immensely popular in the parish. Tyler has been described by E. I. Carlyle as 'a man who inspired strong esteem' and during the remodelling of the southern end of the Parish in 1846 by James Pennethorne, Endell Street was named in his honour at the insistence of his parishioners although, out of modesty, he refused to consent to it being called Tyler Street.

Tyler was widowed young by the death of his wife Eizabeth Ann in 1830 and left with the care of his three children. He later took a second wife, Jane, daughter of Divie Robertson of Bedford Square, by whom he had a son and two daughters.

On the 15th of March 1845, Sir Robert Peel appointed Tyler as a residentiary canon of St. Paul's Cathedral, an office which he held alongside his rectorship until his death at home in Bedford Square on the 5th of October 1851.

Perhaps stimulated by his encounters with Newman at Oriel College, Tyler went on to publish a number of books engaged in the tractarian controversy, upholding the reformed Protestant view of the Church of England. These would focus on the rejection of ritualist innovations such as the intercession of saints, mariolatry, the worship of images as well as a study and synthesis of Early Fathers of the Christian Church with the Book of Common Prayer.

== Selected works ==
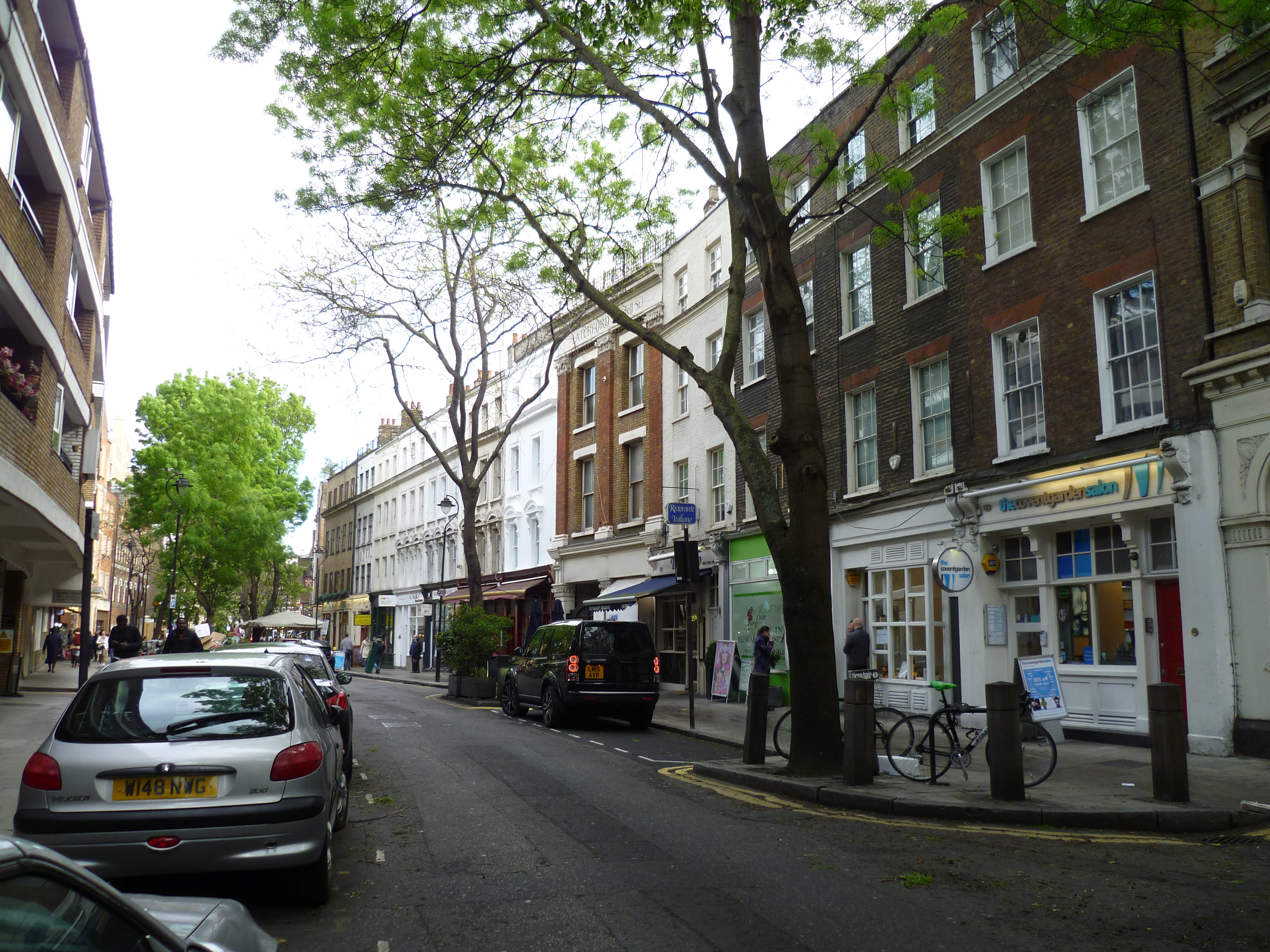
Endell Street London

Besides single sermons, Tyler was the author of:

- 'Oaths: their Origin, Nature, and History,' London, 1834, 8vo; 2nd edit. London, 1835, 8vo.
- 'Henry of Monmouth: Memoirs of the Life and Character of Henry V,' London, 1838, 8vo.
- 'Primitive Christian Worship,' London, 1840, 8vo.
- 'A Father's Letters to his Son on the Apostolic Rite of Confirmation,' London, 1843, 8vo.
- 'The Worship of the Blessed Virgin Mary contrary to Holy Scripture and to the Faith and Practice of the Church of Christ during the first five Centuries,' London, 1844, 8vo.
- 'The Image Worship of the Church of Rome proved to be contrary to Holy Scripture and to the Faith and Discipline of the Primitive Church,' London, 1847, 8vo.
- 'Meditations from the Fathers of the first five centuries arranged as devotional exercises on the Book of Common Prayer, and intended to promote soundness in the faith, and holiness of life', London, 1849, 16mo.
- 'The Christian's Hope in Death,' London, 1852, 8vo.
