= Angus Buchanan (VC) =

Recipient of the Victoria Cross (1894–1944)

Angus Buchanan VC MC
- Born: 11 September 1894; Coleford, Gloucestershire
- Died: 1 March 1944 (aged 49); Gloucester, Gloucestershire
- Burial place: Coleford Cemetery
- Military career
- Allegiance: United Kingdom
- Branch: British Army
- Service years: 1914–1917
- Rank: Captain
- Units: South Wales Borderers
- Conflicts: World War I
- Awards: Victoria Cross; Military Cross; Order of St. Vladimir 4th Class with Swords (Russia)
- Other work: Solicitor

Angus Buchanan, VC MC (11 August 1894 – 1 March 1944) was an English recipient of the Victoria Cross, the highest and most prestigious award for gallantry in the face of the enemy that can be awarded to British and Commonwealth forces.

== Early life ==
Buchanan was the son of a doctor from Coleford, Gloucestershire. He was educated at Monmouth School, where he was head boy. In 1913 he went to Jesus College, Oxford to study classics. One of his tutors described him as "thoroughly Scotch and rather reserved, but a hard worker & likely to be a good influence in the Coll[ege]". He rowed for the college in 1914, played rugby and was Secretary of the Athletics Club. He then joined the army, where he served at Gallipoli and in Mesopotamia. He was awarded the Military Cross in 1916, and was mentioned four times in despatches.

== Award of the Victoria Cross ==
Buchanan was 21 years old, and a temporary captain in the 4th Battalion, South Wales Borderers, British Army during the First World War when the action for which he received his Victoria Cross took place, in the attempts to relieve the British forces besieged at Kut. On 5 April 1916 at the Falauyah Lines he rescued two wounded men while under heavy enemy fire. The award was announced in a supplement to The London Gazette of 26 September 1916:

War Office, 26th September, 1916.,
His Majesty the KING has been graciously pleased to award the Victoria Cross to the undermentioned Officers, Non-commissioned Officers and Men:—
Lt. (temp. Capt.) Angus Buchanan, S. Wales Bord.
For most conspicuous bravery. During an attack an officer was lying out in the open severely wounded about 150 yards from cover. Two men went to his assistance and one of them was hit at once. Captain Buchanan, on seeing this, immediately went out and, with the help of the other man, carried the wounded officer to cover under heavy machine gun fire. He then returned and brought in the wounded man, again under heavy fire.

— London Gazette

On 13 February 1917, five months after the announcement of his award, Buchanan was shot in the head by a sniper and seriously injured. He attributed his survival to the care of his batman, Private Mark Perry. On 8 November 1917, now permanently blinded by his injuries, he was invested with the Victoria Cross and the Military Cross at a ceremony on Durdham Downs, Bristol, by King George V. The ceremony was recorded by Pathé News (see External links). Buchanan had also been previously awarded the Russian decoration of the Order of St. Vladimir 4th Class (with Swords) in July 1916.

== Later life and death ==
He re-joined Jesus College after the war and read law, rowing for the college in 1919 despite his blindness. After graduating in 1921, he worked in a solicitor's office in Oxford before returning to Coleford to work until his death in 1944. In 1921 he attended Monmouth School for the ceremony marking the dedication of the school's war memorial, which he unveiled.

Buchanan died on 1 March 1944 at the Gloucester Royal Infirmary, aged 49. He never fully recovered from his wartime injuries and according to his gravestone and contemporary obituaries, he “died of old wounds” following a brief illness. He was accorded full military honours and was buried in Coleford Cemetery, Gloucestershire—close to the recreation ground that had been established in his honour

== Legacy ==
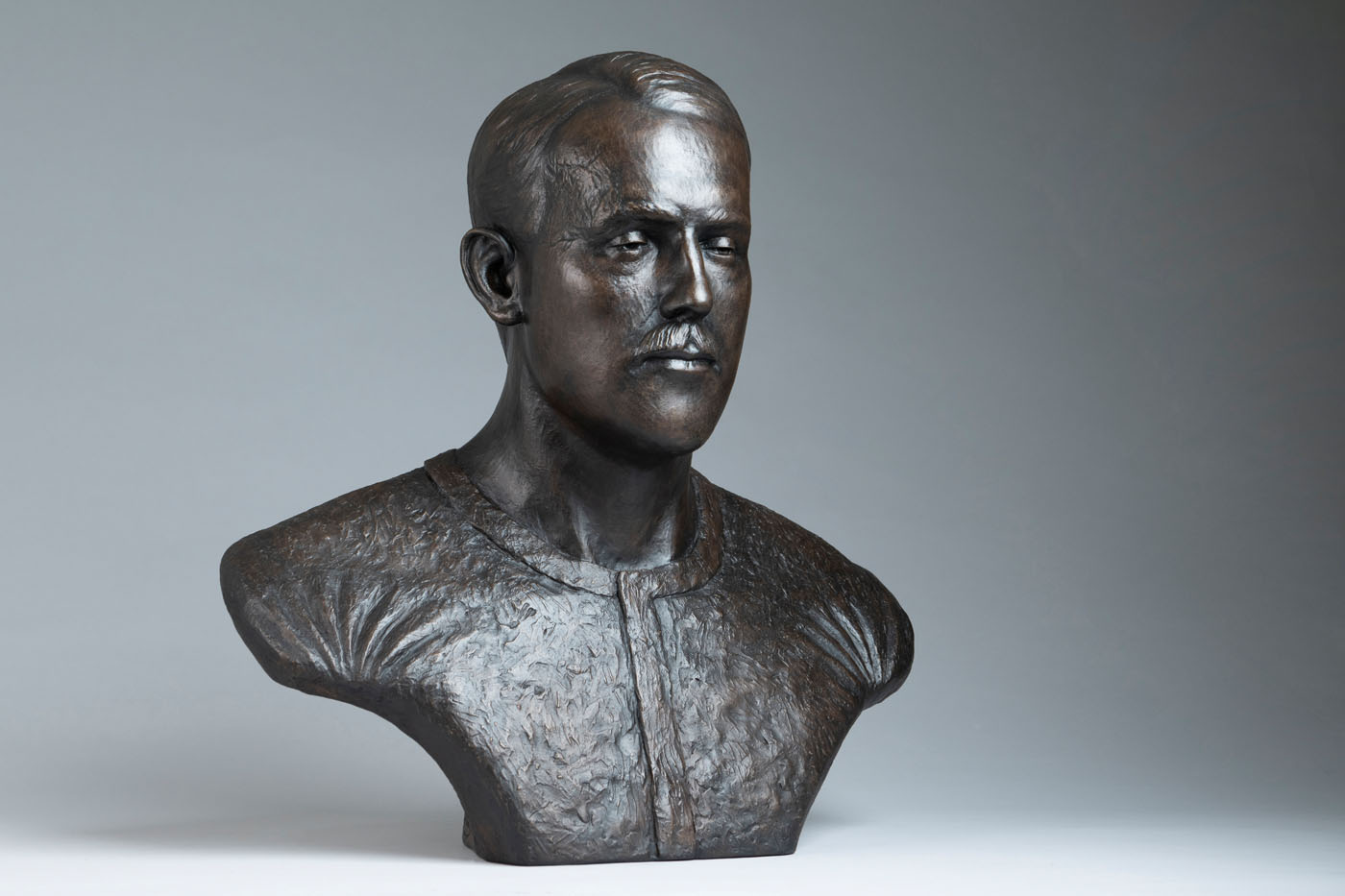
Bronze bust of Angus Buchanan by sculptor Anthony Smith, commissioned for Jesus College. The bust depicts Buchanan in his college rowing top and showing the scars on his temple from when he was shot and blinded during the war.

After WWI, funds were raised in Coleford to mark his bravery and, at Buchanan's request, were used to purchase a playing field for the use of the local children in 1919.

In addition to the playing field at Coleford, Buchanan is also remembered at Monmouth School, where the Upper Sixth Form boarding house, Buchanan House, commemorates him. His Victoria Cross was displayed at the Regimental Museum of The Royal Welsh in Brecon but, following its purchase by Michael Ashcroft in 2013, is now in the Lord Ashcroft VC Collection at The Imperial War Museum.

== Bibliography ==
- Gliddon, Gerald (2005). The Sideshows. VCs of the First World War. Gloucestershire, England: Sutton Publishing. ISBN 978-0-7509-2084-1.
