= Haberdashers' Monmouth School for Girls =

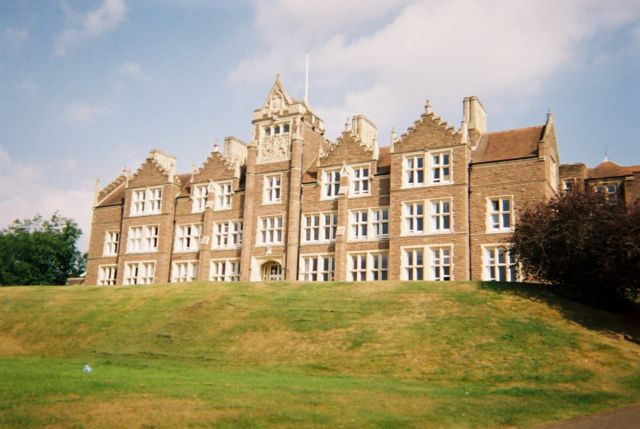
- View of the school's central block by Henry Stock

Location
- 24 Hereford Road; Monmouth, NP25 5XT; Wales; 51°49′05″N 2°42′43″W

Information
- Type: Independent day and boarding school
- Motto: Serve and Obey
- Religious affiliation: Church in Wales
- Established: 1892
- Founder: Worshipful Company of Haberdashers
- Local authority: Monmouthshire
- Department for Education URN: 402008 Tables
- Executive Head: Simon Dorman
- Gender: Girls
- Age: 7 to 18
- Enrollment: 610~
- Website: http://www.habsmonmouth.org/

Haberdashers' Monmouth School for Girls was a boarding and day private school in Monmouth, Wales. Established by the Worshipful Company of Haberdashers in 1892, in June 2022 the Haberdashers began a consultation on proposals to merge the school with Monmouth School for Boys, making them fully coeducational. In October 2024 the amalgamated schools were relaunched as Haberdashers' Monmouth School.

The Good Schools Guide described the school as a "friendly school that produces feisty young women" and noted its "diverse extra-curricular education".

== History ==
HMSG was founded in 1892 by the Worshipful Company of Haberdashers. It opened in temporary premises at Hardwick House while the Company negotiated for a permanent location. In 1897 it moved to its present location. The main block was designed by the Haberdashers' in-house architect, Henry Stock. Both the girls' school and its brother school Monmouth School became direct grant grammar schools in 1946 under the Education Act 1944 and became independent when the scheme was phased out. The prep school, Agincourt, was added in 1997. In June 2022, the Haberdashers began a consultation on proposals to merge the Boys and Girls schools, making them fully coeducational. In October 2024 the amalgamated schools were relaunched as Haberdashers' Monmouth School.

== Houses ==
Each girl belongs to one of the four houses, which are named after former members of the Board of Governors. The house system is separate from boarding houses.

House	Colour
Bagnall Oakely	
Imbert Terry	
Mather Jackson	
Prosser	

== Boarding ==
Girls aged 7 and above may board. Boarders reside in three main houses: Monnow House (Years 3-8), Twiston Davies (Years 9-11) and Augusta House (Sixth Form, Years 12–13).

== Academics ==
HMSG is one of Wales' top performing independent schools. In the GCSEs ranked second in the country in 2010 with a 100% pass rate and came third the following year.

== Extracurricular activities ==
Girls are encouraged to take part in extracurricular activities and non-academic pursuits. There is a wide array of activities, groups, clubs and societies and sports teams that pupils may join. It became the first school in the country to employ a sports psychologist.

The Monmouth School for Girls Rowing Club and lacrosse team have been successful in recent years and team members have represented Wales in school and national competitions. In 2006 both the first and second lacrosse teams won the senior titles in both their categories for the first time in school history and in 2008 the first team was ranked in the top 4 in the United Kingdom and came first in their division. In 2012 several girls were chosen for the Wales lacrosse team for the Home Nations U19 championships. The Junior U16 rowing team won the Schools' Head of the River Race in the eights category.

== Notable former pupils ==
- Jackie Ballard – former MP and Director General, RSPCA. CEO of RNID
- Marina Diamandis – singer-songwriter (stage name Marina and the Diamonds)
- Jane Glover – conductor and musicologist
- Jenny Harries – Chief Executive of the U.K. Health Security Agency
- Sandra Huggett – actress
- Katrina Jacks – Commonwealth Rowing Championships Medallist
- Zoie Kennedy – actress
- Laurie Macmillan (10 May 1947 – 8 October 2001) was a BBC Radio 4 newsreader and continuity announcer.
- Jemima Phillips – Official Harpist to the Prince of Wales (2004–2007)
- Sarah Pochin– MP for Runcorn and Helsby
- Lisa Rogers – Channel 5 TV Presenter
- Laura Tenison – founder of JoJo Maman Bébé
- Cleo Watson – special adviser

== See also ==
- Monmouth School (for Boys)
