= William Jones (haberdasher) =

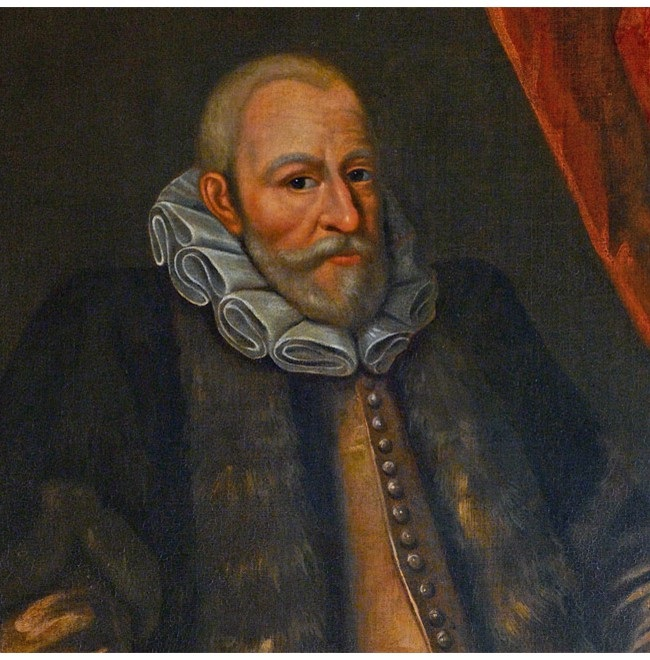
- Born: 1545–1550? Newland, Gloucestershire, England
- Died: January 1615; Hamburg
- Occupation: haberdasher
- Known for: founding schools in Wales

William Jones (c.1545/1550 – January 1615) was a London haberdasher, born in Newland, Gloucestershire, England. He is remembered for his bequests, which led to the establishment of schools in Monmouth and Pontypool, almshouses at Newland, and the so-called "Golden Lectureship" in London.

== Life ==
Jones was apprenticed in Monmouth, but moved to London at about the age of 20. According to one source, he left Monmouth after being unable to pay a fine, and in London became first a porter and then a factor before setting up business in Hamburg, trading in so-called "Welsh cottons", which were in fact made from cheap woollen fabric. The suggestion that he rose from poverty to great wealth has been questioned. The most recent history of Monmouth School suggests he may have been related to Monmouthshire gentry and suggests; "it seems unlikely that his considerable commercial success could have been achieved without initial capital behind him." He became a successful businessman and trader, and a very wealthy member of the Worshipful Company of Haberdashers. According to the antiquary Charles Heath, writing in 1804, Jones returned to Newland at the height of his prosperity, and "instead of appearing in the character and circumstances of his real situation, he assumed the garb and distress of a pauper." Jones is believed to have died in Hamburg in January 1615.

== Legacy ==
In his last will and testament, dated 26 December 1614, besides making many bequests to members of his family, he left "nyne thousand pounds to the Company of Haberdashers of London to ordain a Preacher, a Free School and Alms houses for twenty poor and distressed people, as blind and lame as it shall seem best to them, of the Town of Monmouth, where it shall be bestowed". The endowment also included large areas of land in south London, notably around Deptford, much of which was later sold to railway companies; and additional funds were invested by the Haberdashers Company in Kent and Staffordshire.

Jones also bequeathed to the Haberdashers' Company a house in Size Lane, London, "to some learned and faithful preacher, to be appointed by the Company". As part of the endowment, an annual lecture was to be given, originally at the Church of St Margaret in Lothbury. The duty became known, because of its monetary value to the appointed preacher, as the "Golden lectureship". The "Golden Lectures" continue to this day, organised by the Haberdashers' Company and now held in the church of St Bartholomew-the-Less in the City of London.

A book, A history of the charities of William Jones (founder of the "Golden lectureship" in London), at Monmouth & Newland, by William Meyler Warlow, was published by W. Bennett in 1899.

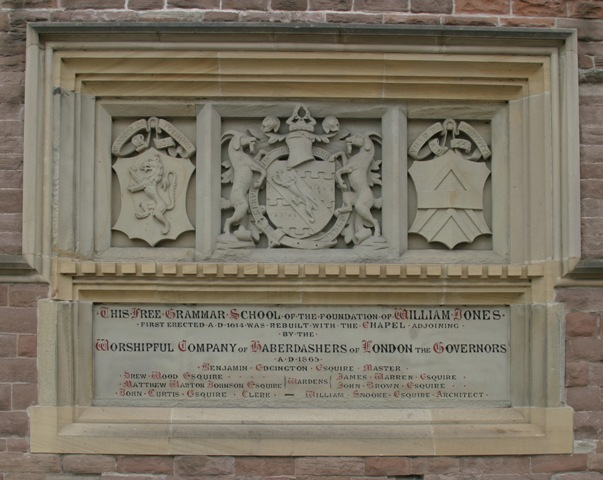
Plaque at Monmouth School, dated 1865, describing its foundation by William Jones

The original school that he endowed, Monmouth School, has continued to be governed by the Worshipful Company of Haberdashers. Jones also endowed almshouses in his home village of Newland. These ten terraced houses were Grade II listed in 1952.

The Haberdashers' Company continued to administer William Jones' Charity, and by 1890 its annual revenue was £10,000. The original foundation was re-organised in 1891 to support a new girls’ school and an elementary school in the town, as well as a boys grammar school in Pontypool, opened in 1898. The elementary school was transferred to County Council control in 1940, with West Monmouth School at Pontypool following in 1955. This left the William Jones's Schools Foundation responsible for Monmouth School and Haberdashers' Monmouth School for Girls, both of which later became fully independent schools.

== Sources ==
- Edwards, Stephen; Moseley, Keith (2014). Monmouth School: The First 400 Years. Third Millennium Publishing. ISBN 978-1-906507-91-6.
- Kissack, Keith (1995). Monmouth School and Monmouth 1614 - 1995. Hereford: Lapridge Publications. OCLC 34886939.
