= Old Town Hall, Newport =

Municipal building in Newport, Shropshire, England

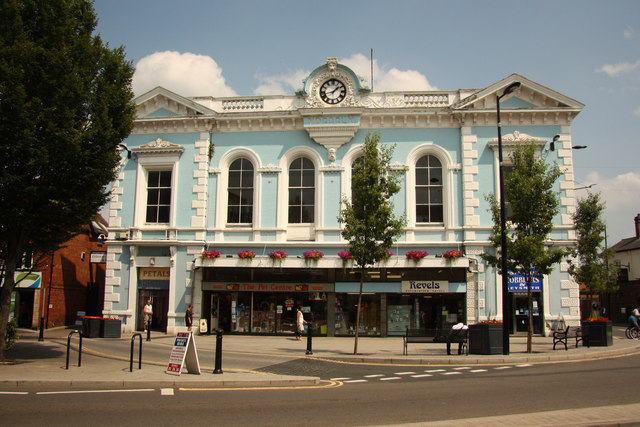
- Old Town Hall, Newport

- Shown in Shropshire
- 52.7689°N 2.3783°W
- Location: St Mary Street, Newport

History
- Built: 1860

Site notes
- Architect: John Cobb Jr.
- Architectural style: Italianate style

Listed Building – Grade II
- Official name: Former Town Hall
- Designated: 29 June 1978
- Reference no.: 1367292

The Old Town Hall is a municipal building in St Mary Street, Newport, Shropshire, England. The structure, which is now divided into a series of shop units on the ground floor and used as a children's play area on the first floor, is a Grade II listed building.

== History ==
The first municipal building in Newport was an ancient buttercross which was erected to the southeast of St Nicholas Church. Following a great fire, it was rebuilt at the expense of Thomas Talbot, a younger son of John Talbot, 10th Earl of Shrewsbury, in 1665. It was a simple structure designed in the neoclassical style with ten columns supporting a frieze and a roof which was pedimented at both ends. After it was found to be in a dilapidated condition, the old buttercross was demolished in 1860.

In 1858, an act of parliament was passed which allowed the Newport Market Company "to provide a market house and market place and other buildings for public accommodation". The site selected for the new building was further to the southeast along the High Street, close to the junction with Stafford Street. The new building was designed by a local architect, John Cobb Jr. of Chetwynd End, in the Italianate style, built in brick with a stucco finish and was completed in 1860.

The design involved a symmetrical main frontage of six bays facing onto the High Street with the end bays slightly projected forward as pavilions. The central section of four bays originally contained two round headed doors on the ground floor. On the first floor, the central section was fenestrated by round headed windows with architraves. At roof level there was a modillioned cornice, a balustraded parapet and a central clock supported by elaborately carved scrolls and garlands. The outer bays contained doorways on the ground floor and square headed sash windows with cornices on the first floor, all surmounted by modillioned pediments. Internally, the principal rooms were a courtroom on the ground floor and a ballroom on the first floor. Behind the town hall, there was a nine-bay covered market hall, a corn exchange, some magistrates' offices and a mechanics' institute.

The borough council was abolished under the Municipal Corporations Act 1883. However, the town hall continued to be used by the local masonic lodge for their meetings. The use of the corn exchange declined significantly in the wake of the Great Depression of British Agriculture in the late 19th century. The corn market was re-purposed as a cinema from 1913: branded as "The Picture House", it operated until 1962.

After the area became an urban district in 1894, Newport Urban District Council used the building for official business, but that use ceased when the council moved to council offices at Chetwynd End in the 1960s. The courtroom was converted for retail use but, after a period of use as a function room, the ballroom fell into disuse in the 1990s. An extensive programme of refurbishment works to restore the ballroom at a cost of £120,000 was completed in January 2018. It initially re-opened as a dual-purpose fitness studio and function space, but, from May 2023, it became a children's play area.
