= Newport Show =

Newport Show is held at Chetwynd Deer Park at Chetwynd, Shropshire, England, between Newport and Edgmond.

== History ==
On 24 August 1889, a circular was sent out by Mr W H Burton, Chairman of Furber and Burton Auctioneers (later to become Davies White and Perry), expressing the desire to form an Agricultural Society to replace the former North Shropshire Society which, much to the dissatisfaction of many in the Newport area, had recently amalgamated with the Shropshire and West Midland Agricultural Society.

Newport farmers, especially tenant farmers who were the majority in those days, had little chance of winning prizes at the West Midlands Show. Indeed the Newport & Market Drayton Advertiser in 1889 recorded that "It was annoying that gentlemen and landed proprietors who carried off prizes at the Royal Show then went on to compete for prizes at the West Mid Show".

A meeting was called on 7 September 1889 at The Royal Victoria Hotel, Newport and Sir T F Boughey, squire of Aqualate took the chair. A motion was carried to form a Society carrying the title "Newport and District Agricultural Society" with an operative radius of 16 miles from Newport. Mr W H Burton was appointed secretary, stating "He had little difficulty in forming such a Society, which would be of such useful profit to the neighbourhood". Mr Wingfield Dickenson, manager of Lloyds Bank, Newport, was appointed treasurer.

The Show's first committee of 30 included Messrs J Pearce, W Derrington-Turner, T Booker, H Pooler, J S Furnival, J Belcher, S Addison, J Paddock, R N Heane, C R Liddle, W Vaughan, and Dr Elkington. By February 1890 the first President, Sir Thomas Boughey, had been appointed with the Marquis of Stafford as the first Vice President. Sir Thomas's nomination to serve as President of the Society was greeted with acclaim. Ten years later he was described as the "Father of the Society".

One of the first tasks facing the steering committee was that of choosing a date for the inaugural Show. C H Liddle suggested September but in the end Friday 8 August 1890 became the chosen date for the first ever Newport Show or exhibition. With the benefit of a £100 donation from Sir Thomas Boughey, followed later by £20 from his wife Lady Annabelle, the rules were drawn up and preparations began for the first show which was held at Victoria Park. Tenders for equipping the Showground were invited. A schedule of classes was drawn up to include livestock, root crops, implements, cheese, butter, wool, horse leaping and turnouts. There was even a prize for "male and female servants of Society members"!

Thus the Newport and District Agricultural Society was founded, to organise the annual Newport Show and for the improvement of agriculture. To this day, it bears all of the hallmarks of that early tradition. The show still keeps strong ties with the town and the town's educational establishments, especially Harper Adams University.

== Chetwynd Deer Park ==
Sited on the banks of Chetwynd pool, which is a 20-acre (81,000 m^{2}) pool, Chetwynd Deer Park is a natural show area and ground in the country.

Chetwynd Park was part of the Chetwynd Park estate, mentioned in the Domesday Book. It was an important manor in Saxon times. The area belonged to Leofric, Earl of Mercia, in about 1050.

Chetwynd Deer Park got its name from the herd of some 100 fallow deer which were brought up from Southern England. The area is home to some of Shropshire's finest ancient woodland.

The Estate was left to Oxford University, who sold it in 1988, with the deer park being purchased by Newport and District Agricultural Society. The society set about the task of restoring the park to its former glory and at the same time, creating what is acknowledged to be one of the most beautiful show grounds in the country. In addition, the society has developed the educational potential of Chetwynd Deer Park by building The Lodge in 2013 and as a result, many local schools and community groups as well as Harper Adams University visit the deer park for educational purposes.

=== Other events held ===
- The Tern Valley Vintage Machinery Show.

== See also ==
- Chetwynd Park estate
- Chetwynd, Shropshire
- Chetwynd park
- Newport, Shropshire
