= Newport Guildhall =

Municipal building in Newport, Shropshire, England

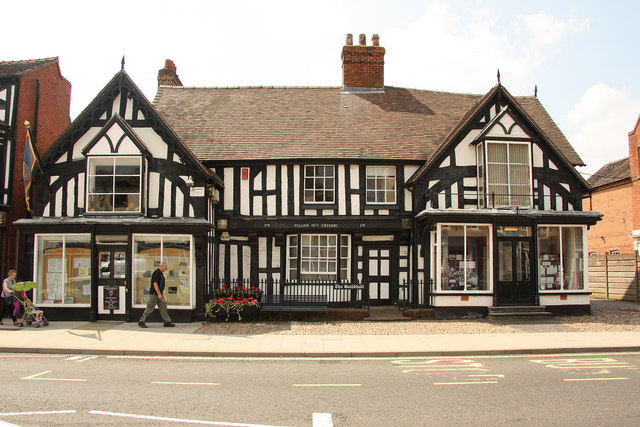
- Newport Guildhall

- Location within Shropshire
- 52.7671°N 2.3780°W
- Location: Newport, Shropshire

History
- Built: 1400

Site notes
- Architectural style: Medieval style

Listed Building – Grade II*
- Designated: 28 April 1952
- Reference no.: 1177807

Newport Guildhall is a large timber-framed municipal building in Newport, Shropshire, England. It is a Grade II* listed building.

== History ==
The current building replaced an earlier guildhall on the site which is mentioned in a document dated 1252. The southern part of the current building was constructed as a single room, with gable to the road, possibly as a meeting place for the Guild of Newport, in around 1400. The building was built in a typical medieval style with exposed timbers and brick infilling which has been painted white. An intermediate floor was added to the original hall at a later date. Testing of the beams in the roof using dendrochronology suggests that the current roof was added in 1486.

The northern part of the building was constructed in a similar architectural style in the late 16th century. The internal beams on the ground floor in this part of the building were decorated with chevrons, antlers, acanthus leaves and pomegranates with the last of these being associated with Catherine of Aragon. The two buildings were unified externally as a single building with a continuous roof-line in the early 19th century. A beam visible on the front elevation of the building, with the name "Wm Gregari" and dated 1615, was not a feature of the original building and was probably taken from a local public house and inserted to add an additional air of authenticity in the late 19th century.

On 13 June 1991, the building was acquired by the Boughey Trust, a trust corporation established by Lady Boughey in memory of her late husband, Sir Thomas Fletcher Fenton Boughey, 4th Baronet who died on 30 August 1906. The Boughey Trust made the guildhall available, rent-free, to Newport Town Council who restored it with the support of English Heritage and it was officially re-opened to the public by Algernon Heber-Percy, Vice-Lord Lieutenant of Shropshire, on 25 March 1995. In spring 2019 improvement works were carried out involving a new boiler and new carpets, paintwork and lighting.

The ground floor of the southern section of the building is used as a council information centre while the ground floor of the northern section is used as a tea room. Meetings of the Town Council are normally held in the council chamber on the first floor of the building. The council chamber is also used for weddings and civic ceremonies.

== See also ==
- Grade II* listed buildings in Telford and Wrekin
