= Chetwynd End =

Suburb of Newport in Shropshire, England

Coordinates: 52.772989°N 2.380951°W

- Suburb
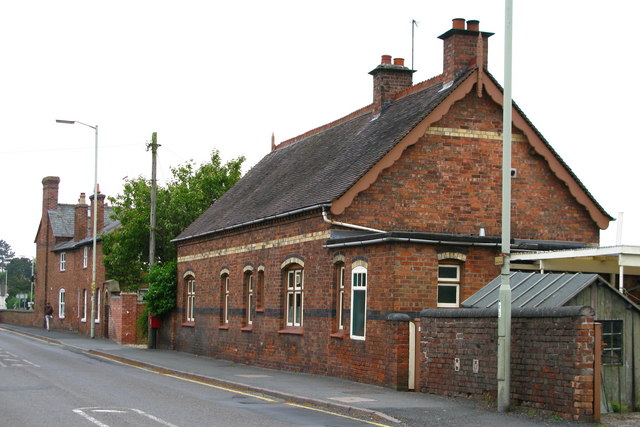
- Chetwynd End

- Location within Shropshire
- OS grid reference: SJ743194
- Civil parish: Newport
- Unitary authority: Telford and Wrekin
- Ceremonial county: Shropshire
- Region: West Midlands
- Country: England
- Sovereign state: United Kingdom
- Post town: NEWPORT
- Postcode district: TF10
- Dialling code: 01952
- Police: West Mercia
- Fire: Shropshire
- Ambulance: West Midlands
- UK Parliament: The Wrekin

Chetwynd End is a suburb of Newport in the Telford and Wrekin borough in Shropshire, England. It is within the Newport civil parish. It is directly north of Newport town centre, partially separated by the Shrewsbury and Newport Canal.

== History ==
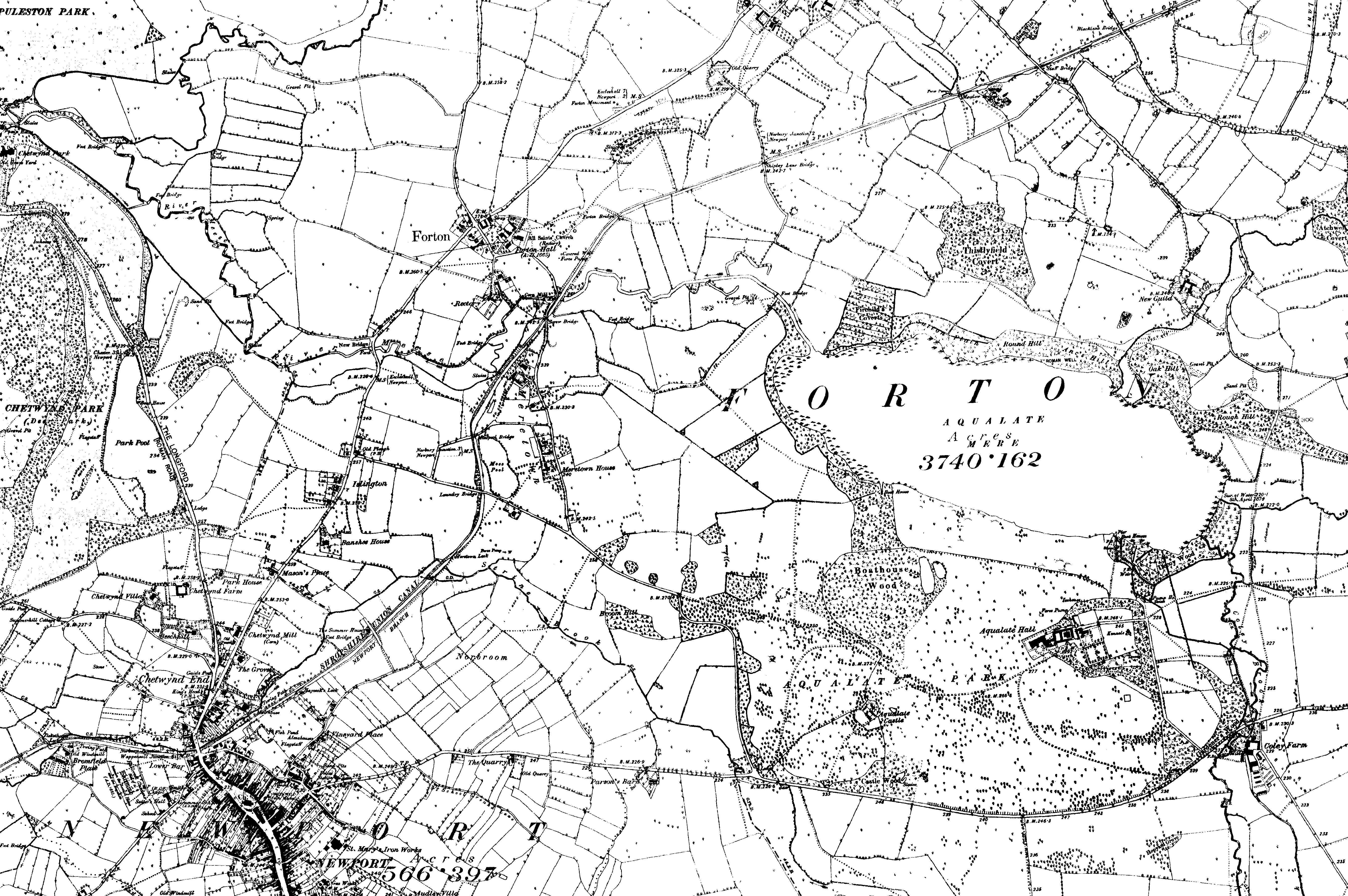
Chetwynd End on a map from 1883 to 1895

The area was home to many public houses and houses. It is reported that 3 and 5 Chetwynd End date back to medieval times.

== Geography ==
Chetwynd End is directly north of Newport at the confluences of the Shrewsbury and Newport Canal. It is also close to the Chetwynd Park estate and Chetwynd Park. Additionally, the A41 road runs to the east and north of the area towards Market Drayton, Prees and Whitchurch.
