= John Meeson Parsons =

British art collector (1798–1870)

John Meeson Parsons (October 27, 1798 – March 26, 1870) was an art collector.

Parsons, youngest son of Thomas Parsons of Newport, Shropshire, was born at Newport, and educated by the Rev. Richard Thurstfield of Pattingham, then by the Rev. Francis Blick of Tamworth, and afterwards privately at Oxford; but hard reading brought on inflammation of the eyes, which obliged him to give up all study.

He then settled in the city of London, and became a member of the Stock Exchange. Early in his London career he took an interest in railways, was elected an associate of the Institution of Civil Engineers on 5 Feb. 1839, and on 9 Feb. 1843 became a director of the London and Brighton Railway Company, of which he was appointed chairman on 19 June 1843. In this office he was succeeded by Pascoe Grenfell on 11 April 1844, and ceased to be a director on 21 Aug. 1848. He was also a director of the Shropshire Union Railway from 1845 to 1849.

For many years he resided at 6 Raymond Buildings, Gray's Inn, and spent much of his time in collecting pictures and works of art. He had amassed at the time of his death a valuable gallery of pictures, principally of the German and Dutch schools, and of water-colour drawings by English artists. By his will he left to the trustees of the National Gallery, London, such of his oil paintings, not exceeding one hundred, as they might choose to select, and in case of their declining to accept the gift wholly or in part, then the same right of selection to the department of science and art at South Kensington. He also bequeathed to South Kensington any of his water-colours, sepia or charcoal drawings which they might be pleased to select, not exceeding one hundred. The trustees of the National Gallery selected only three, ‘Fishing Boats in a Breeze off the West,’ by J. M. W. Turner, and two paintings by P. J. Clays of Brussels. The department of science and art in June 1870 selected ninety-two oil and forty-seven water-colour paintings. A number of fine engravings were also left to the British Museum.

Parsons removed from 6 Raymond Buildings in November 1869 to 45 Russell Square, Bloomsbury, and died there aged 81. He married a daughter of John Mayhew, but was soon left a widower with one daughter, Ellen, who, on 16 May 1860, married Sir Charles William Atholl Oakeley, bart., of Frittenden House, Staplehurst, Kent.
