= Newport, Shropshire =

Market town in Shropshire, England

Coordinates: 52°46′09″N 2°22′43″W

Newport
- Town and civil parish
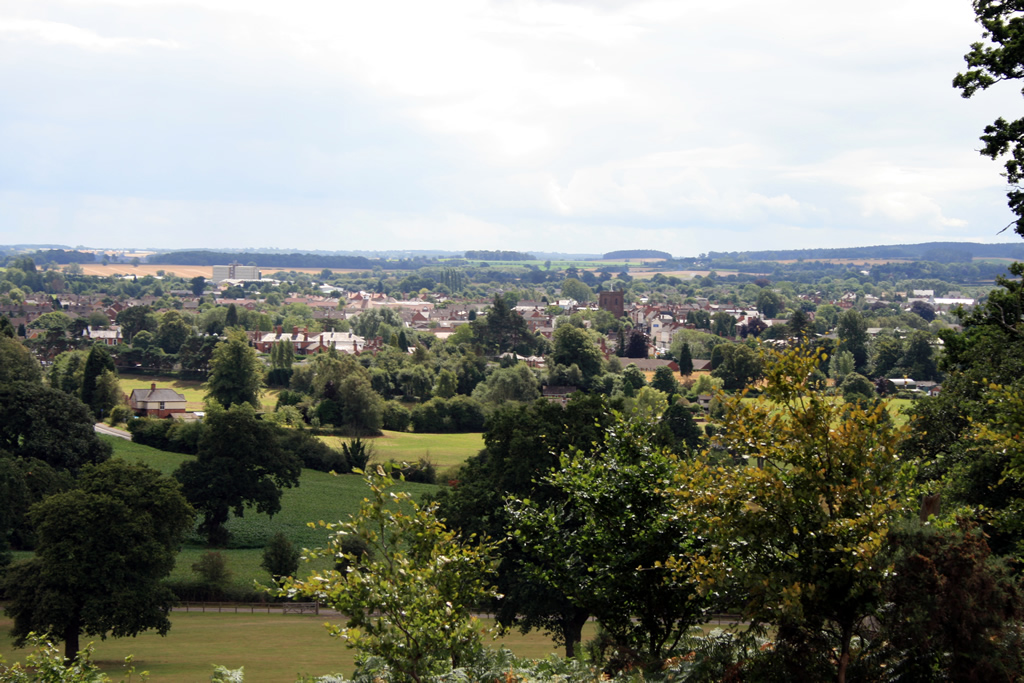
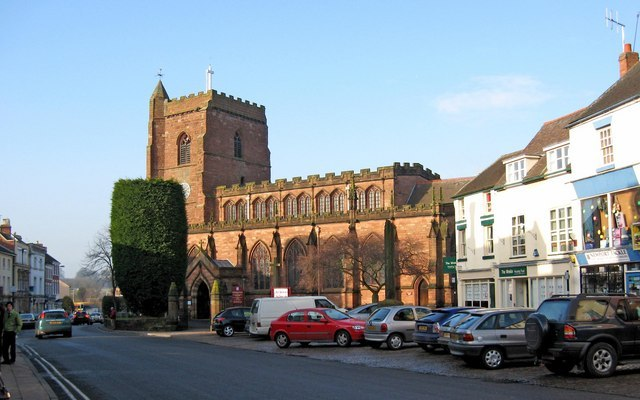
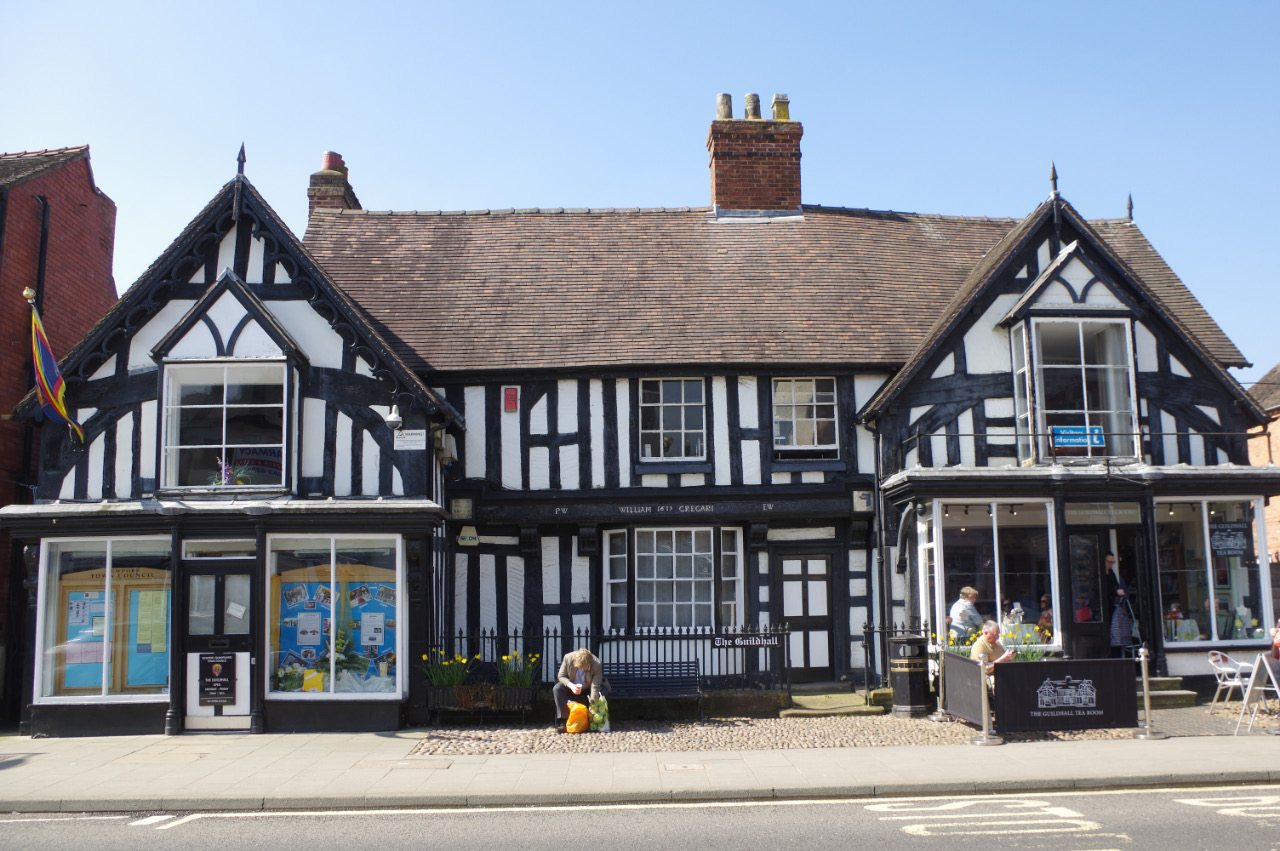
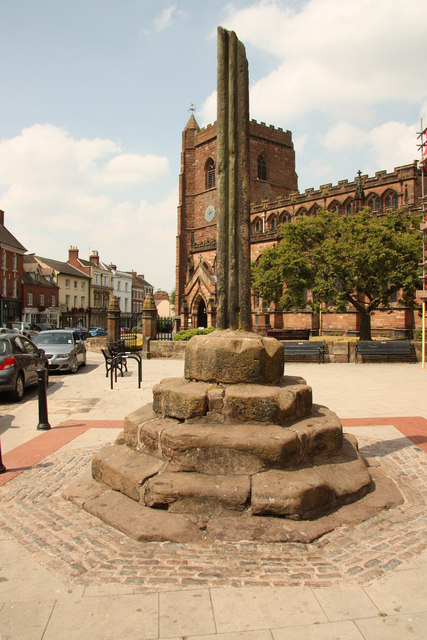
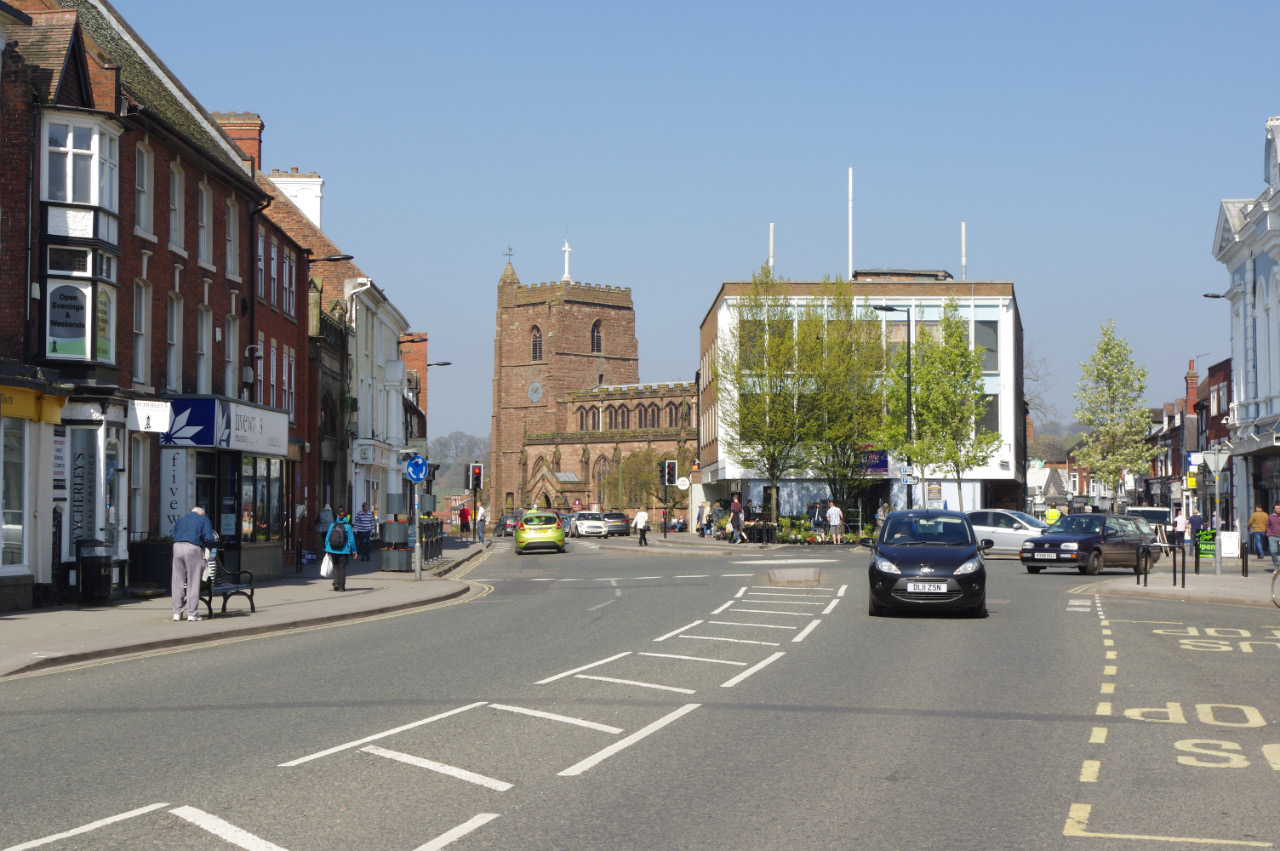
- From the top clockwise: Newport from Cheney Hill, Newport Guildhall, High Street, Puleston Cross and St Nicholas Church

- Location within Shropshire
- Population: 14,182 (2021 Census)
- Demonym: Novaportan
- OS grid reference: SJ745191
  - London: 148 miles (238 km) SE
- Civil parish: Newport
- Unitary authority: Telford and Wrekin
- Ceremonial county: Shropshire
- Region: West Midlands
- Country: England
- Sovereign state: United Kingdom
- Areas of the town: List: Chetwynd Aston (Village); Chetwynd End; Church Aston (Village); Longford; Lower Bar; Meretown
- Post town: NEWPORT
- Postcode district: TF10
- Dialling code: 01952
- Police: West Mercia
- Fire: Shropshire
- Ambulance: West Midlands
- UK Parliament: The Wrekin
- Website: Official website

Newport is a market town and civil parish in the borough of Telford and Wrekin in Shropshire, England. It lies 7 miles (11 km) north-east of Telford, 12 miles (19 km) west of Stafford, and is near the Shropshire-Staffordshire border. The 2001 census recorded 10,814 people living in the parish, which rose to 11,387 by the 2011 census.

== Toponym ==
The Normans planned a new town called Novus Burgus roughly on the Anglo-Saxon settlement of Plesc. The first market charter was granted by Henry I, and over time the name changed from Novus Burgus, to Nova Porta, to Newborough and finally to Newport in about 1220.

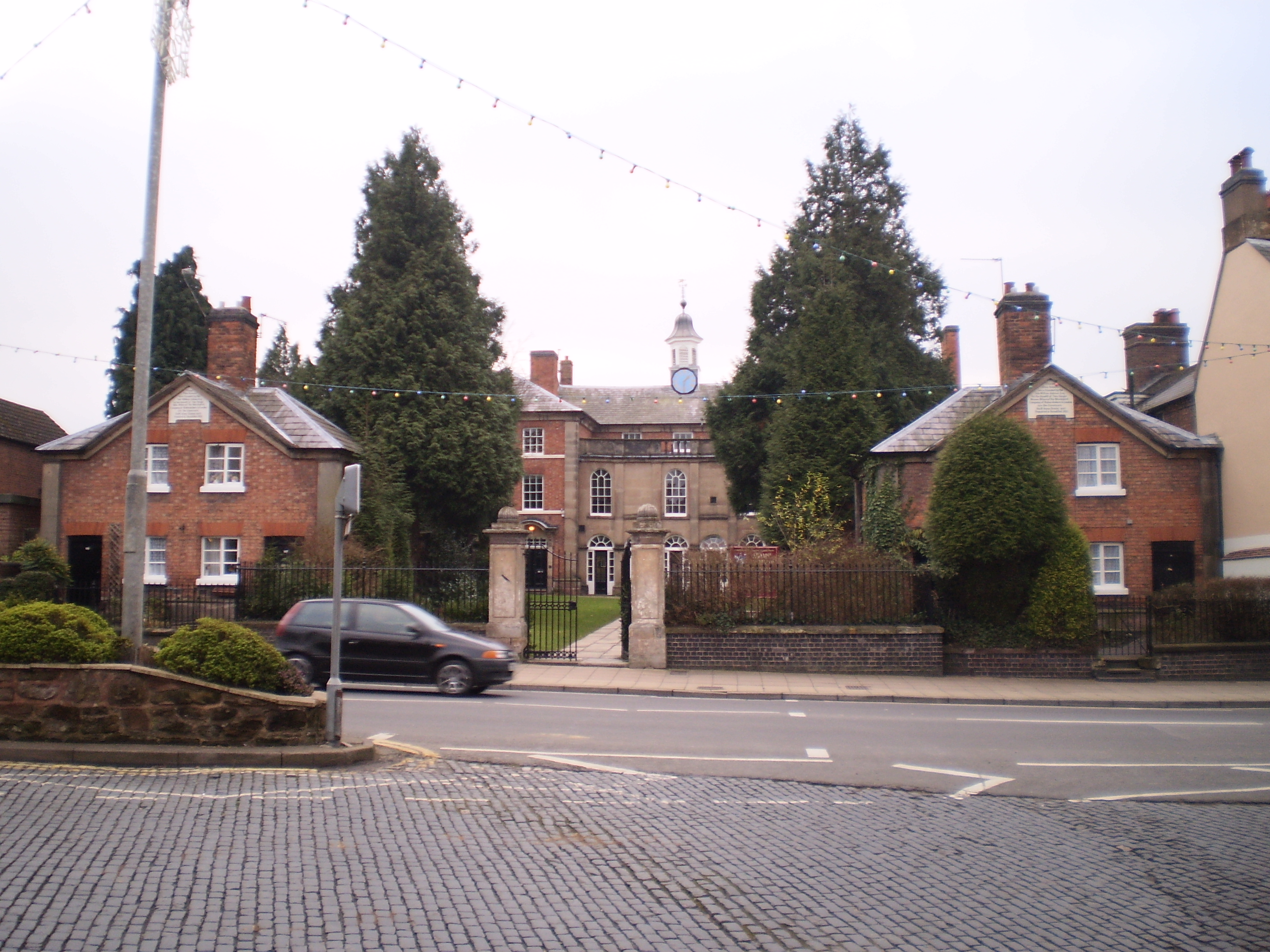
The Deans' houses and front of Haberdashers' Adams

== Location ==
The site was chosen partly because of its location near the Via Devana (Roman Road, which ran from Colchester to Chester), and partly because of the number of fisheries (which are mentioned in the Domesday Survey). The River Meese, which flows from Aqualate Mere, lies to the north of the town.

Newport sits on a sandstone ridge on the eastern border of the Welsh Marches and west of the Aqualate Mere, the largest natural lake in the English Midlands. The area around it at the end of the last ice age was part of Lake Lapworth. Formed from melting glaciers, it covered a vast area of north Shropshire. There is evidence of pre-historic fishing in the area as two ancient log boats were uncovered one mile (1.6 km) from Newport. One has been preserved and is kept at Harper Adams University at nearby Edgmond.

The villages of Church Aston, Chetwynd Aston and Longford are adjoined to the south of Newport, though they remain in separate parishes. The village of Edgmond is located just to the west, separated by Cheney Hill, Chetwynd Park and the currently truncated Shrewsbury and Newport Canal.

Like many rural market towns, Newport was influenced by industry; it served the needs of the mining area to the east of Shropshire and was also affected by mass-produced industrial goods that replaced traditional crafts.

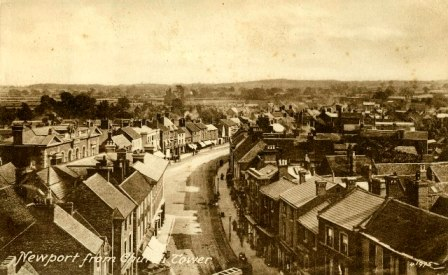
Newport from church tower

Newport's inland location can lead to very cold winters. It holds the record for the lowest temperature recorded in England, −26.1 °C (−15.0 °F) on 11 January 1982. This was cold enough to freeze diesel fuel in vehicles.

== History ==
Newport was located in the historic kingdom of Mercia, near where Wreocensæte was once situated. Humans inhabited the surrounding area long before the creation of the town. Once established, Newport became a market town in the centre of the rural farming area between Stafford and Shrewsbury.

=== Saxon period ===
In Saxon times, there were two settlements in the area. The first, Eastun, has been identified as Church Aston, and the second was Plaesc which is now Newport. In AD 963, Plaesc was described as having a High Street, a stone quarry, and a religious community. The name Plaesc means a shallow pool. Few signs of the Saxon settlement exist today, apart from the High Street, the Quarry, which could be either the Quarry on Stafford Road, or the Hole Meadow on Wellington Road. This has not been definitely confirmed.

=== Norman to Tudor period ===
At the time of the Norman Conquest, the land where Newport sits formed part of the manor of Edgmond, which William I gave as a gift along with the county of Shropshire to Roger, Earl of Shrewsbury. Henry I founded the borough, first called Newborough, after the manor came into his hands from Robert de Belesme.

Newport was omitted from the Domesday Book of 1086, but this is not uncommon. Other towns omitted include London, Tamworth and Ludlow, all boroughs since Saxon times.

The Normans planned the new town around the older one during the reign of Henry I. The wide main street was designed for its market, and the narrow burgage plots running at right angles to it are typical of Norman architecture and planning, though today only Newport Guildhall and Smallwood Lodge are clear signs of Tudor buildings, due to the 1665 fire which destroyed most of the High Street.

Medieval Newport flourished with trade in leather, wool and fish. Novoportans possessed the right to provide fish for the Royal table. The many half-timbered buildings surviving from the late medieval and Tudor periods confirm Newport's success, leading to the first market charter which was granted by Henry I.

The town is mentioned once by John Leland in a list of castles, though now no visible remains of the castle exist; however, the most probable location for it would have been the traditional site of a manor house at Upper Bar, where there is a fragment of a square, broad moat, or on the higher ground along the Forton road, where the Castle House school stands. As regards the moat, nearly square, forming by measurement an area of 60 square yards, two sides have been filled with rubbish. Nothing is known about the occupants of the moated site. It could have pre-dated the town or, perhaps more likely, could have been the manor house of the Audleys, who were granted the manor in 1227. By 1421, the manor house was in ruins.

One of the main reasons for Newport's early wealth was the surrounding fisheries and the chief service of the burgesses, being that of taking fish to the Royal court wherever it might be. This custom was continued after Henry III had granted the borough, with the manor of Edgmond, to Henry de Audley; Henry's son James granted in the middle of the 13th century that the burgesses need not take the fish anywhere except within the county of Shropshire.

The burgesses received certain privileges from Henry I; Henry II, in an undated charter, granted them all the liberties, rights and customs that they had enjoyed in the time of Henry I, including a guild merchant, which is mentioned in the quo warranto rolls as one of the privileges claimed by the burgesses. Confirmation charters were granted by Edward I in 1287 and Edward II in 1311, while the town was incorporated in 1551 by Edward VI, whose charter was confirmed by James I in 1604. The governing body consisted of a Lord High Steward, deputy steward, two water-bailiffs and 28 burgesses, but the corporation was abolished by the Municipal Corporations Act 1883, and a local board was formed, which, under the Local Government Act 1894, gave place to an urban district council.

=== Stuart to Regency period ===
In 1665, many buildings were damaged in the Great Fire of Newport, which started in the home of a local blacksmith and destroyed the homes of 162 families (without causing deaths) to the then-value of £30,000 (£5.6M in 2025) and only a few of the medieval structures remain. However, there remain many fine Regency and Georgian frontages built on the site of the former Norman plots. This allowed the main streets of Newport to be wider and less cluttered than those of the other towns of its age.

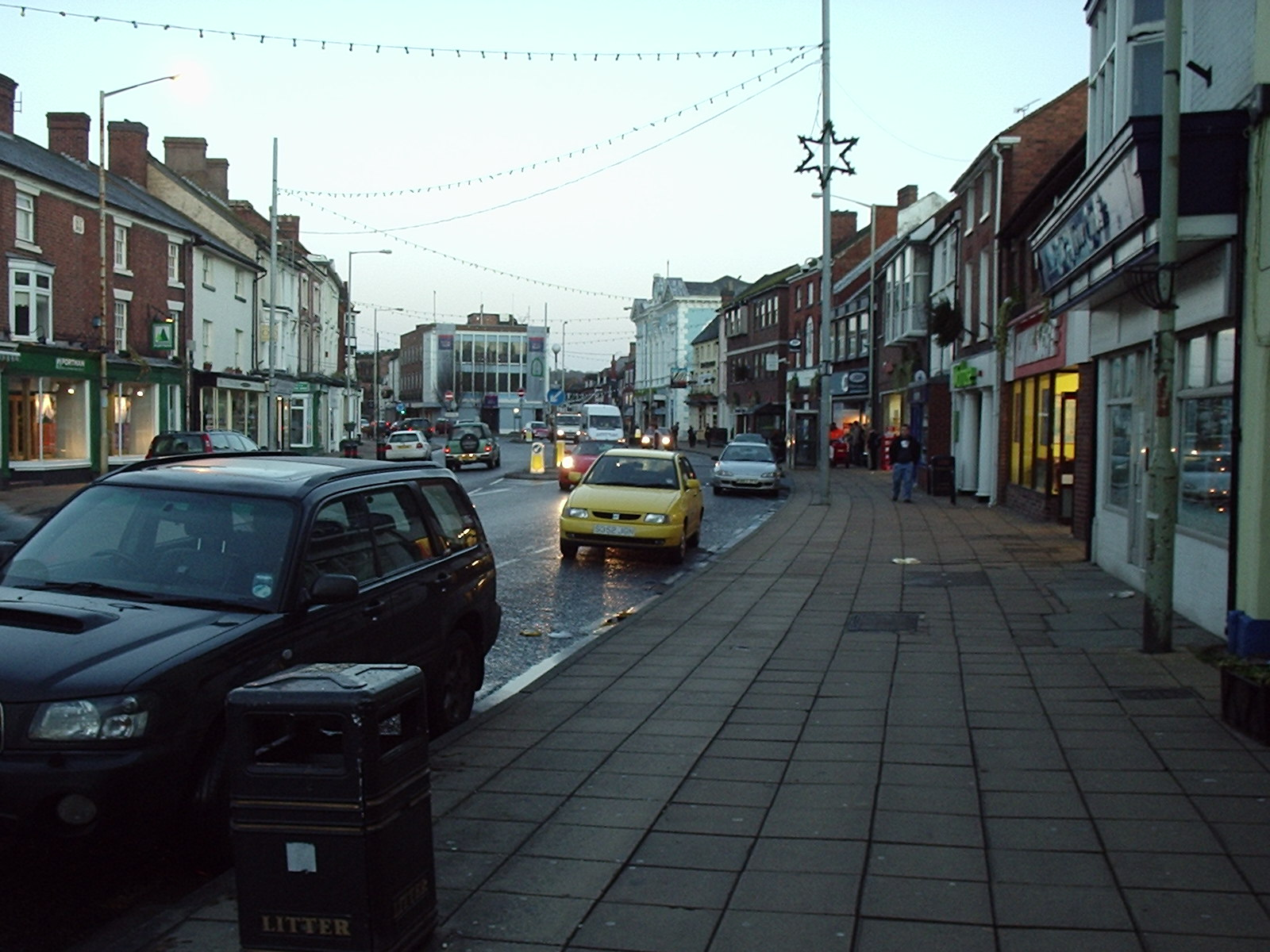
Newport High Street

=== Local landed estates ===
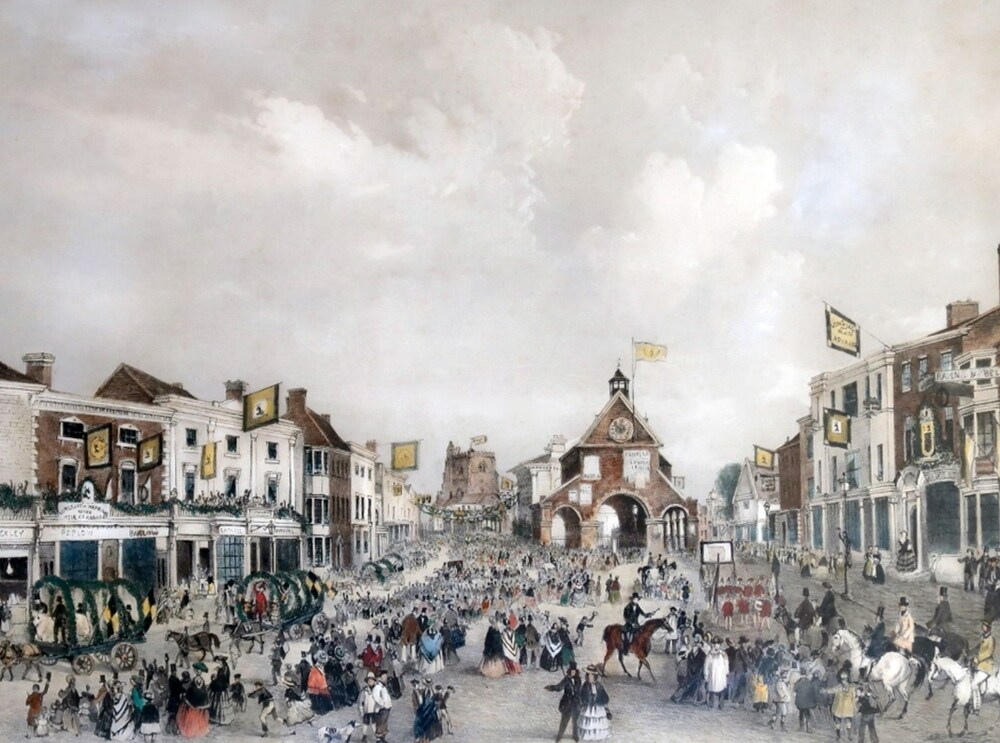
Tinted engraving showing Newport High Street in 1857, by Henry Lark Pratt, depicting celebrations at the time of the coming of age of Thomas Fletcher-Boughey on 25 April 1857.

By the 19th century, Newport was surrounded by large estates that came right to the verge of the town, determining size and development. The vivary and open fields at Norbroom had gone making the town dependent on its rural hinterland. The few fields that remained were for hay or cattle, forming a small green belt. These estates exerted a powerful influence on the town, something obvious in the deference shown and respect paid to these landed families until at least the First World War.

Beginning in the southwest of the town was the largest estate, the Lilleshall estate of the Duke of Sutherland. This dates from the dissolution of the monasteries, the lands of Lilleshall Abbey being purchased in 1539 by James Leveson of Wolverhampton.

The next estate was that in the south-east of Woodcote Hall, a smaller one belonging to the Cotes family.

On the west between Lilleshall and the town was the Longford Estate of the Talbots, Earls of Shrewsbury, sold in 1789 to Ralph Leeke of Wellington who had made his fortune in the East India Company.

North of the town is the Chetwynd Park estate of the Pigotts, bought in 1803 by Thomas Borrow of north Derbyshire who changed his surname to Burton Borough.

The Aqualate Estate to the east lies mostly in Staffordshire.

=== 20th century ===
The town was fortunate to avoid civilian casualties during the Second World War when on Christmas Eve 1944, a V-1 flying bomb launched from a Heinkel bomber and aimed at Manchester landed in a field east of Newport, about 300 yards from the Newport to Gnosall road. This bomb is now on display at Royal Air Force Museum Cosford.

The passenger service on the railway line between Stafford and Wellington was withdrawn in 1964 as a result of the Beeching Axe, and the line closed completely in 1967. The track was lifted in 1969, and the Newport end was subsequently redeveloped for housing.

In the 1960s to early 1970s, when the population of Newport was nearer 3000, over a third of the local workforce was employed at Serck Audco Valves, Greenwood Moore, Kwiz Feather Flights etc. All of this industry and large-scale employment has since gone - mostly during the late 1970s and early 1980s.

On 23 November 1981, an F1/T2 tornado which formed over the nearby civil parish of Chetwynd later moved over Newport, causing some damage in the town.

At Harper Adams University College just outside Newport in Edgmond, on 11 January 1982 the English lowest temperature weather record was broken (and is kept to this day): −26.1 °C (−15.0 °F).

=== Modern-day Newport ===
Newport is now predominantly a commuter town, with people travelling to Telford, Shrewsbury, Stafford, Wolverhampton and beyond for employment.

Previously, very little redevelopment happened in Newport from the 1960s—attention going instead to nearby towns including Wellington and Oakengates, which make up the new town of Telford—until the Telford and Wrekin Council borough towns incentive was brought about in 2007. The town received major investments over the following years, including a major redevelopment of the canal and surrounding area, the lower bar of the High Street area, planned housing, bars and restaurants set to line the canal. New sporting facilities, including a climbing wall in the Springfield area of the town, were provided.

In the spring of 2010, the first stage of the town's £1.5 million regeneration began, with the £250,000 and £300,000 redevelopment of Victoria Park behind the now-defunct The Royal Victoria Hotel. The next stage of the regeneration, which was mainly focused on the High Street area of the town and Central square, involved re-surfacing the High-Street pavements and changing the design of the High Street around the Puleston Cross, removing the cobblestones and replacing them with paving and the traced outline of the ancient market hall.

In July 2011, Telford and Wrekin Council unveiled plans for green land off the A518 bypass. The proposals included hundreds of new homes, a new supermarket, a business park and improvements to Burton Borough School.

House prices in the town are the highest in the TF postcode area (including the towns of Telford and Market Drayton) and among the highest in the county.

The town is currently attempting to acquire Transition Towns and Fairtrade Town statuses.

== Facilities and places of interest ==
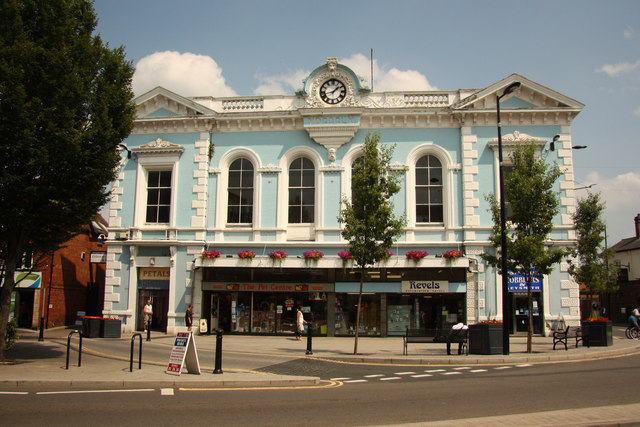
The Town Hall and Market Hall Complex

=== The High Street ===
The main street in Newport follows the Norman design. This resulted in the distinctive long wide High Street, split into three parts, upper bar, lower bar and St Mary's street, with the centre of the high street being the 19th-century Town Hall and Market Hall completed in March 1860.

Burgage plots ran along either side, and the church rising up in the middle, with the High Street with St Mary's Street splitting off and re-joining the high street around the island on which are sited the St Nicholas Church and the Puleston Cross (an ancient memorial cross usually known locally but inaccurately as the Butter Cross).

After the fire of Newport in 1665, the old Norman buildings were replaced with grander Georgian architecture, which hid the work yards behind. The Georgian shops remain, but the work yards have now been developed into housing and the Boughey Gardens tennis courts, next to the literary institute.

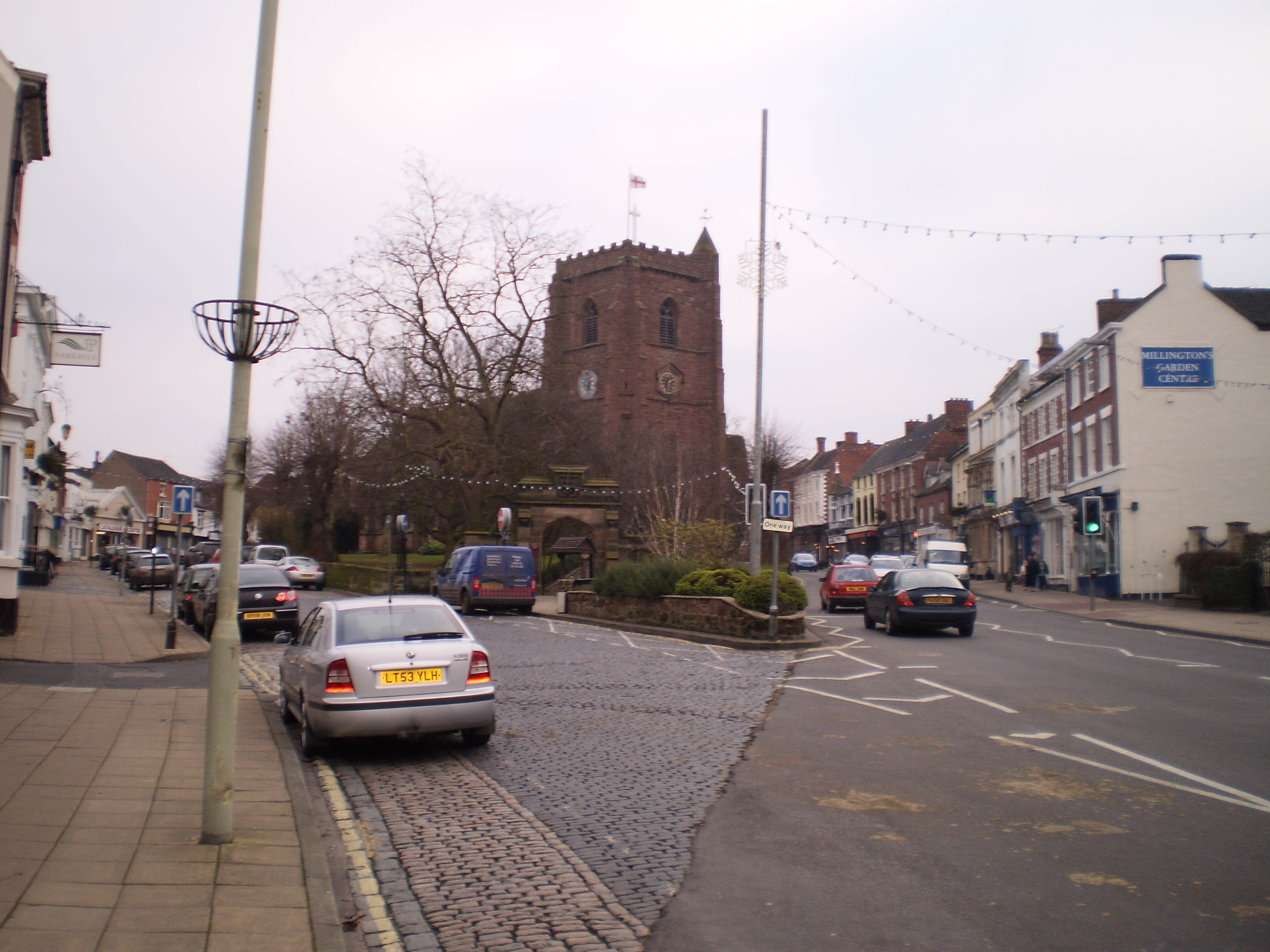
High street and St Mary's street junction and St Nicolas Island

Newport has retained shops on High Street, Stafford Street and St Mary's Street, with St Mary's Street having cobblestones and the majority of shops being small boutiques. St Mary's is also the site of various markets and fairs, which tie in with Newport's indoor market.

On the Newport by-pass near to the Aqualate Mere the A518 road there is a small out-of-town industrial estate known as Mere Park, featuring a garden centre, hotel and restaurant. There are also various other small-scale industrial estates that lie around the Newport by-pass and Springfield estate.

=== Other areas ===
The oldest man-made landmark in the town is the Puleston Cross, which is a butter cross positioned near the Church of St Nicholas. This is a 13th-century cross denoting a marketplace. The cross was set up in memory of Sir Roger de Pyvelesdon (i.e. 'de Puleston') who died in 1272, in Shropshire. This is confirmed in a deed signed by his son Sir Roger de Puleston in 1285, which refers to the cross set up for the soul of Roger de Pyvelesdon who died in 1272.

Towards the top end of the town is the Combat Stress centre, built in 1908 as the infirmary for the Newport Workhouse; it was subsequently developed, named Audley House, as accommodation for elderly ladies until its closure in 1995. The home was purchased in 1996 and refurbished.

The town sits near the Aqualate Mere (within Staffordshire), which is the largest natural lake in the English Midlands.

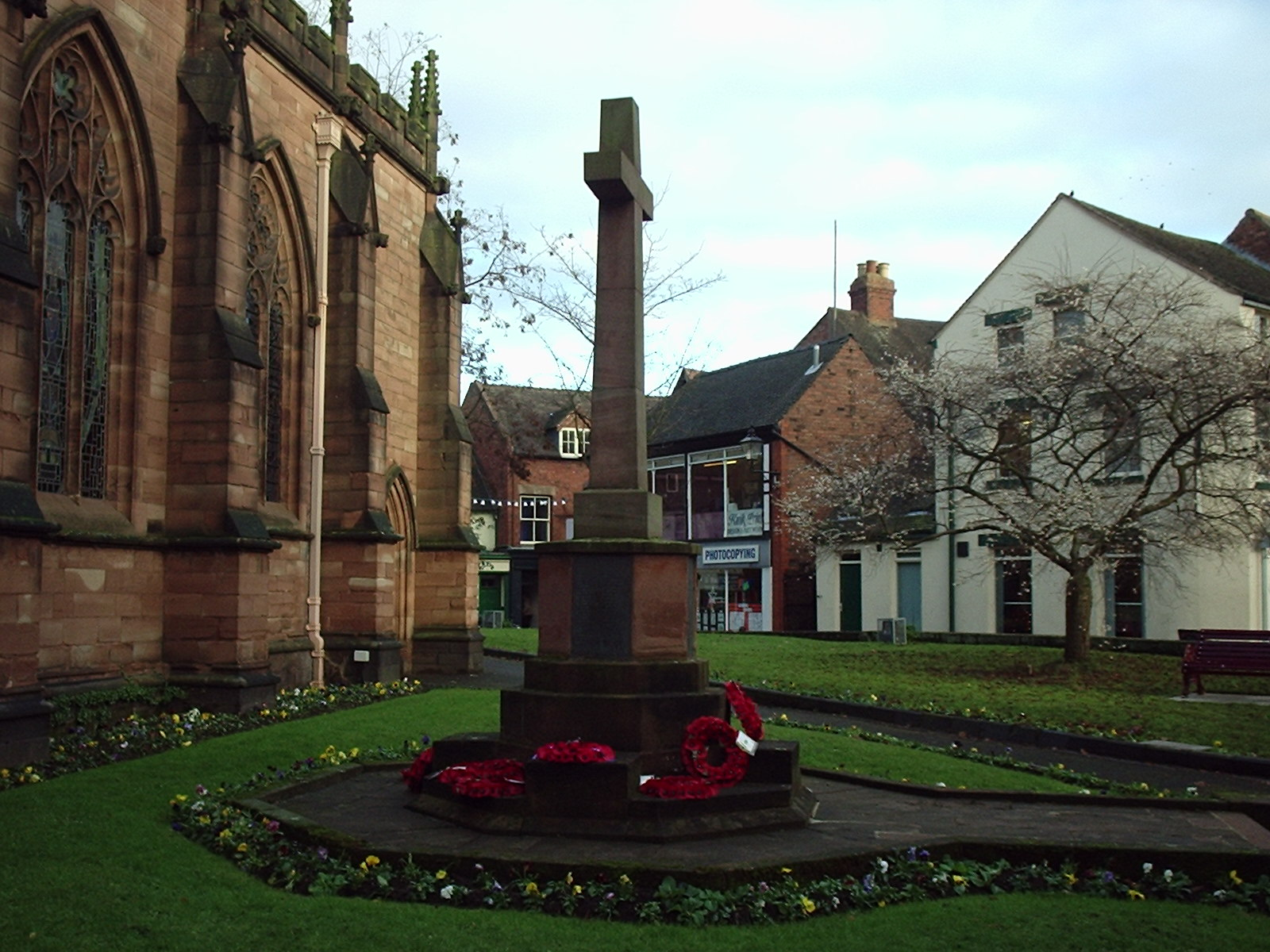
St Nicholas's Church & Newport war memorial

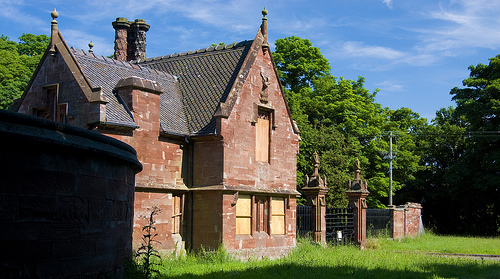
Aqualate lodge to Aqualate Hall

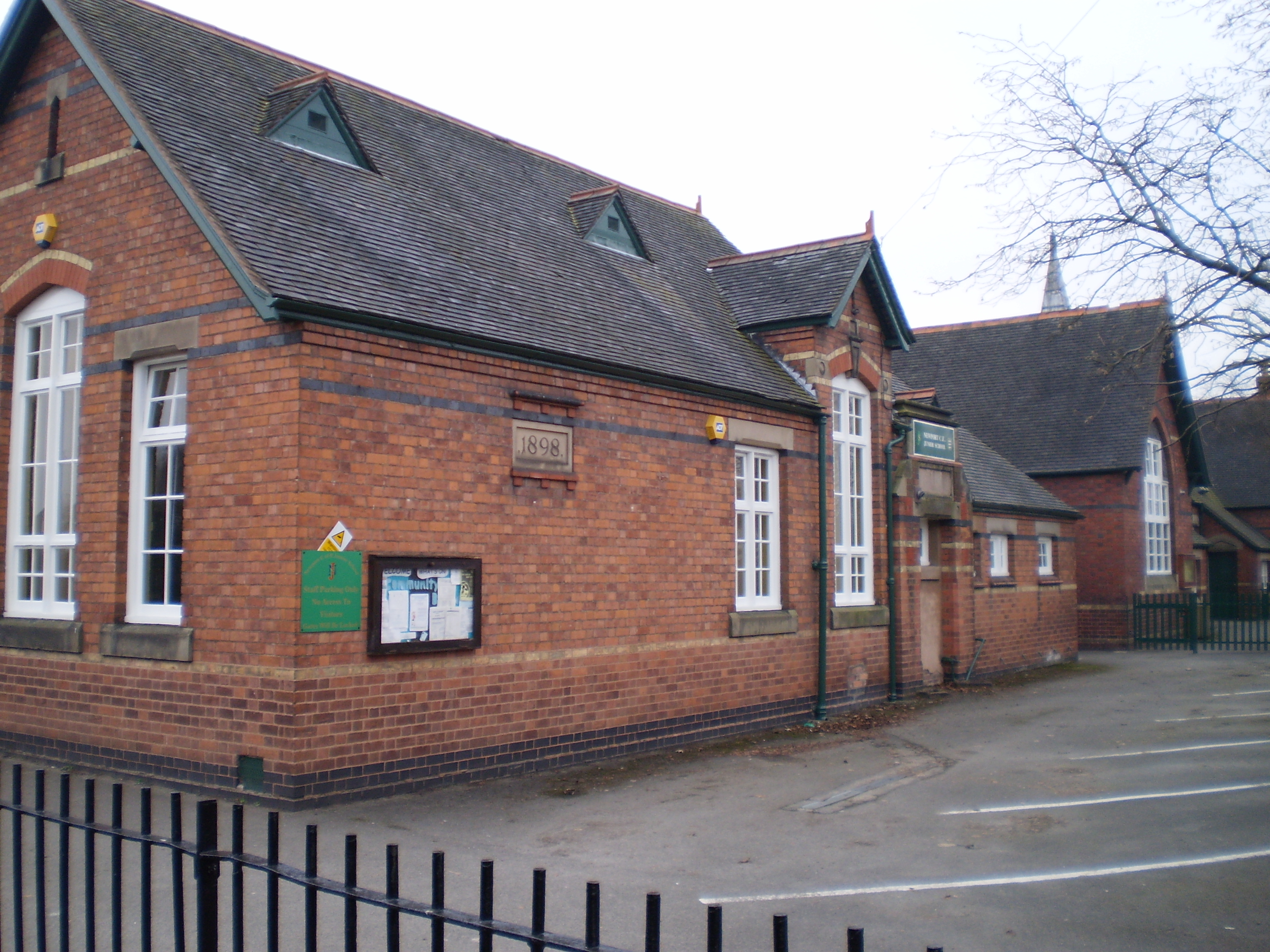
Newport junior school, built 1872

=== Religious sites ===
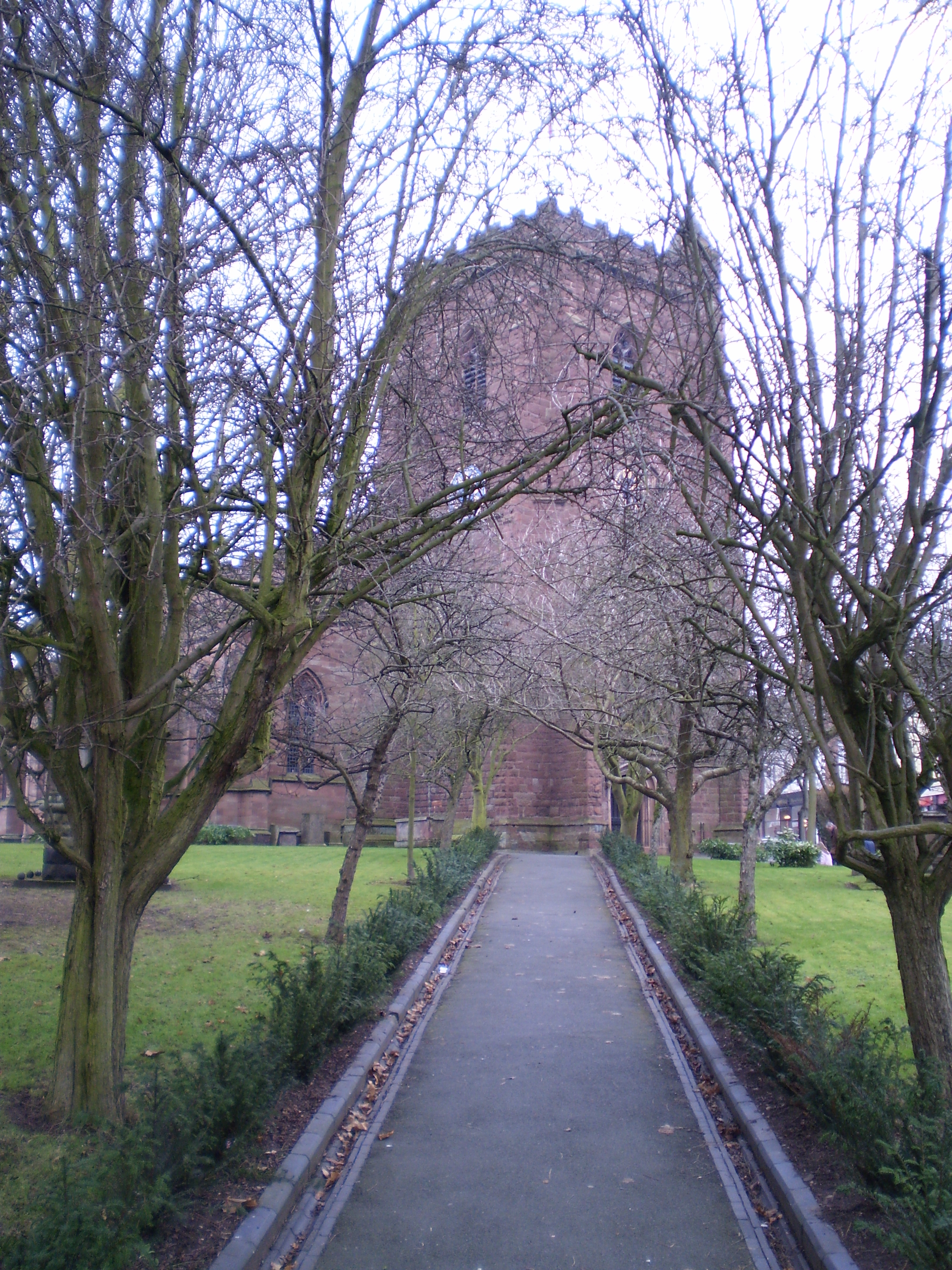
St Nicholas's Church

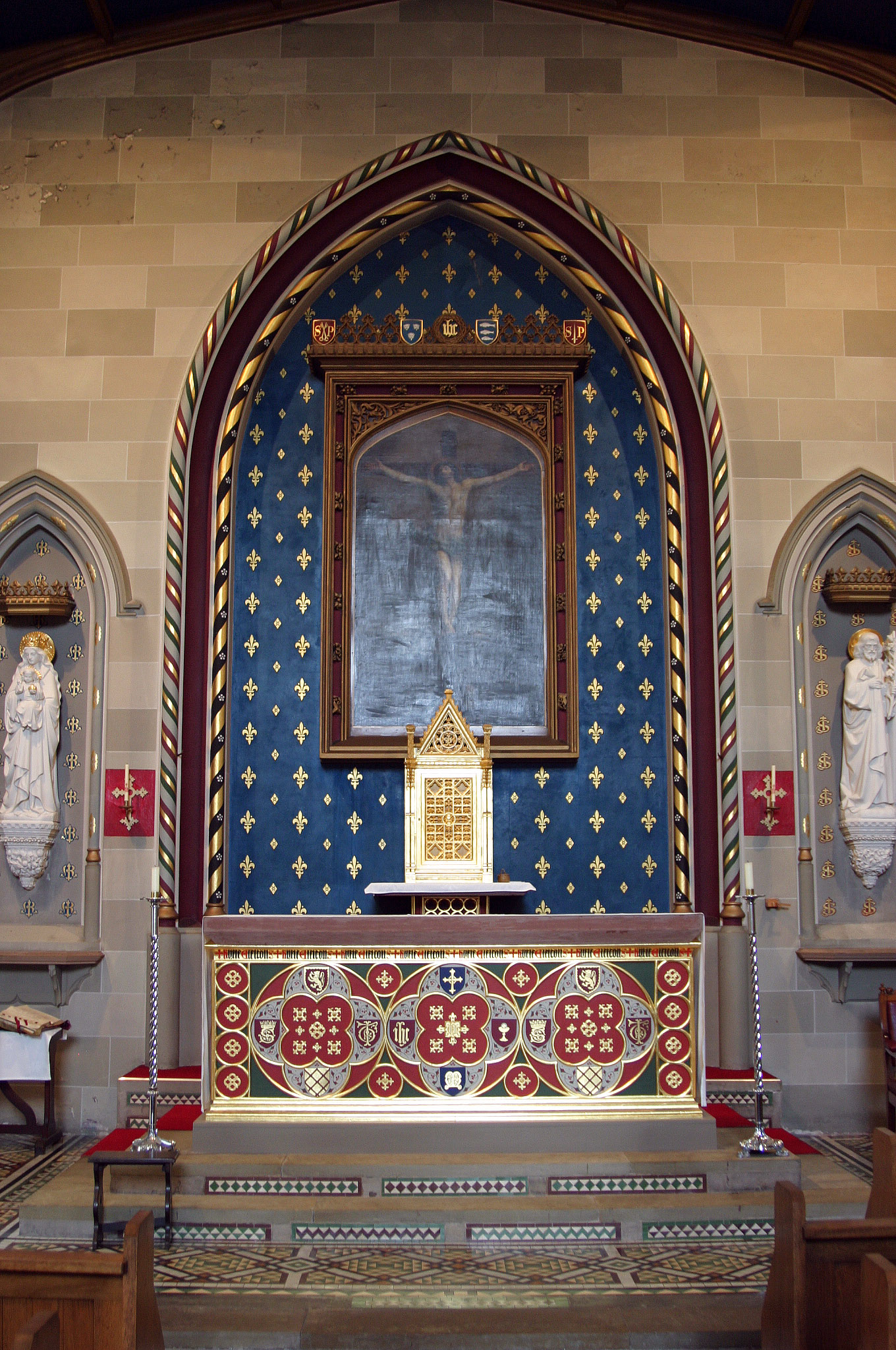
Inside SS Peter and Paul Church designed by Augustus Pugin.

The first recorded religious community was documented in Saxon script from 963 AD. This was the church of St Mary Magdalene, built in the time of Archbishop Dunstan.

Newport lies in the Church of England Diocese of Lichfield and the Roman Catholic Diocese of Shrewsbury and as a Norman-planned new town, religion played a strong part in the design of the town, with the centre of the town being dominated by St Nicholas Church, originally built in the reign of Henry I and restored in 1886 and 1890.

The second church in the town is the St Peter and Paul Catholic church in Newport Salters Lane, built 1857 and the oldest Catholic church in Shropshire, designed by Augustus Pugin.

The ruins of Lilleshall Abbey are 4 miles (6.4 km) from the town centre. They include a Norman west door and part of the front, considerable remains of the church besides, and traces of domestic buildings. The abbey was founded in 1145, under charter from King Stephen, by Richard de Baumes or Belmeis, dean of St Alkmund, Shrewsbury, for Augustinian canons, who were brought from Dorchester Abbey, Oxfordshire.

A smaller church for the Baptist community sits at the back of The Royal Victoria Hotel in water lane, called Newport Baptist church, which was built in the 1960s.

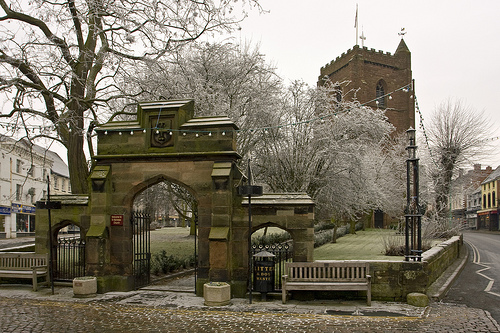

The town has had a wide range of religious sites over time and this is shown in the number of churches in the town, the Independent Chapel, Beaumaris Lane, Newport, built 1803 on the site of a church dating from 1765, converted into cottages in 1832 when they finished work on the new church, the Newport Independent (Congregational) Chapel, Wellington Road, built in 1831, subsequently becoming part of the United Reformed Church. It merged with the Methodist Chapel in Avenue Road in 2001 to become Trinity Church, a joint Methodist/United Reformed Church. A major renovation was undertaken in 2010.

Due to the growth and decline of religions over time some previous churches have since been used for other uses or been demolished altogether, most of these are in the Upper Bar area of the town, around the Granville road and Wellington road area.

Near to the Trinity church is the Newport Primitive Methodist Chapel, built 1877, closed 1920 which replaced the one built in Stafford Road, built 1830. This is still there as a house next door to the New Inn.

Two more former churches are the Newport Wesleyan Methodist Chapel, Upper Bar, built 1829, which was turned into a shop and theatre in 1876 and the Wesleyan Methodist Chapel in Avenue Road which was built in 1876 and closed in 2001 on merging with the Wellington Road URC Chapel; it subsequently became a gym but has since been converted into a house.

Independent Chapel, Beaumaris Lane

Newport General Cemetery was opened for burials on 2 March 1859 with its first interment taking place on 5 March 1859 when it is noted that some 1,000 people witnessed the burial. The cemetery contains a chapel built at the same time and is bounded at the public roadside by fine wrought iron railings and gates. The cemetery was originally laid out with four oval lawns around a cross-shaped set of roads with the chapel centrally placed. The cemetery contains the war graves of eleven British Army soldiers of World War I and a soldier and airman of World War II, who are commemorated by a row of Commonwealth War Graves Commission headstones. Also buried there is former first-class cricketer Tom Collins who was headmaster at Newport Grammar School.

== Economy ==
Newport is the main hub for the farming community along the Shropshire/Staffordshire border and as a local business centre. The Football Association, Medical and Exercise Science Department is based at Lilleshall Hall on the outskirts of the town.

A large section of Newport's economy is based around education, two selective state schools and a large comprehensive drawing students from far beyond the town, as well as a university on the edge of the town along with a regional food academy.

Retail plays a major part of the economy of the town, with the majority of shops being located in and around the High Street, with larger out-of-town stores located on the Audley Avenue and Springfield trading estates in the south of the town and to the east of the town the Mere Park complex.

== Culture ==
=== Events and venues ===
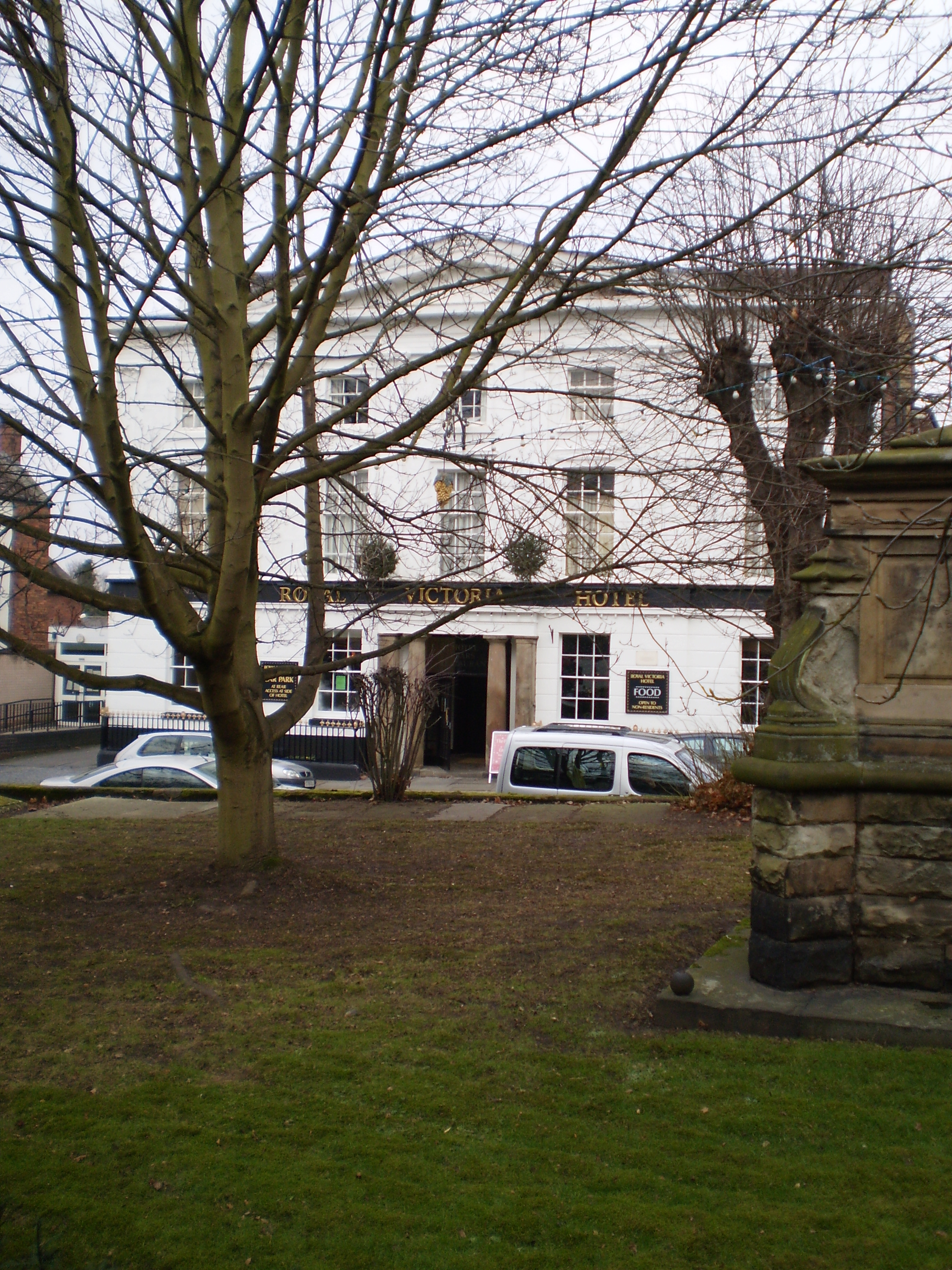
The Royal Victoria Hotel

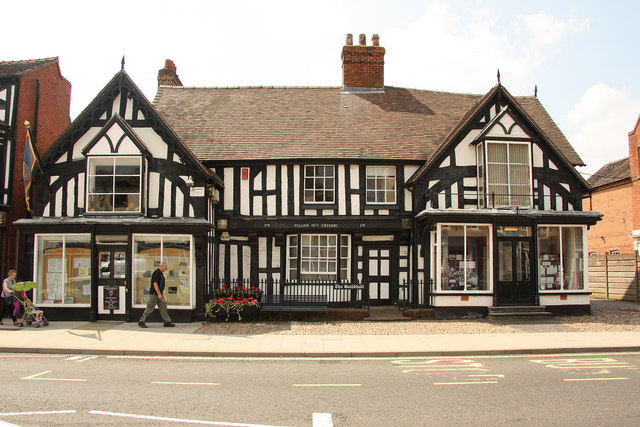
Newport Guildhall, dating back to around 1400

Cosy Hall is used for the Newport music festival.

The Newport Guildhall is a medieval timber-framed building which dates back to around 1400.

=== Town events ===
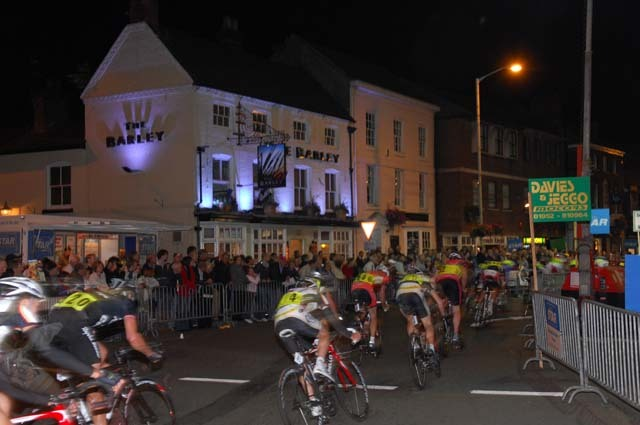
Newport Nocturne Bike race 2006

The town hosts many events throughout the year, but six main events bring people to Newport. Newport Show is hosted yearly at Chetwynd Deer Park and is the major annual event in the town, first held in Victoria Park in 1890 and now attracting 13,000 visitors each year. The show is now held at Chetwynd Deer Park between Edgmond and Newport.

In the centre of town itself the main events are the Newport Carnival and the Newport Old Tyme Market. The biggest event in the town is the biennial Newport Nocturne Bike Race.

=== Heart of England in Bloom ===
In 2009 Newport became the first town in the country to win six gold awards in a row in the Heart of England in Bloom regional competition of the Britain in Bloom contest. The 2010 competition gave Newport its seventh consecutive gold medal.

== Media ==
The town is covered by a local community radio station called NOVA FM, which broadcasts from the high street on 97.5FM, and by regional stations Greatest Hits Radio Midlands, Hits Radio Black Country & Shropshire, and BBC Radio Shropshire.

Local news and television programmes are provided by BBC West Midlands and ITV Central. Television signals are received from The Wrekin TV transmitter.

The Newport and Market Drayton Advertiser, is the town's weekly newspaper, in publication since 1854, has premises located on St Mary's Street. The town is also covered by the county-wide Shropshire Star and The Shropshire Magazine. All are published by Shropshire Newspapers Ltd. Nova Magazine, first published in 1994 as Nova News, is a free monthly magazine distributed to Newport, Church Aston, Edgmond, Tibberton, Hinstock, Forton, Sutton, Norbury, Gnosall, Outwoods, Moreton, Sheriffhales, Muxton and Lilleshall.

=== In the media ===
Christmas Guisers' Play from Newport, Shropshire [1883] is about the town. Newport was the first town in Shropshire to be on Dickinson's Real Deal. A television documentary called The Spy Who Stole My Life showed the town as the backdrop of the Robert Hendy-Freegard story, who conned students from the town was shown by Channel Five on 7 September 2005. In Australia, this was called The spy Who Conned Me.

== Education ==
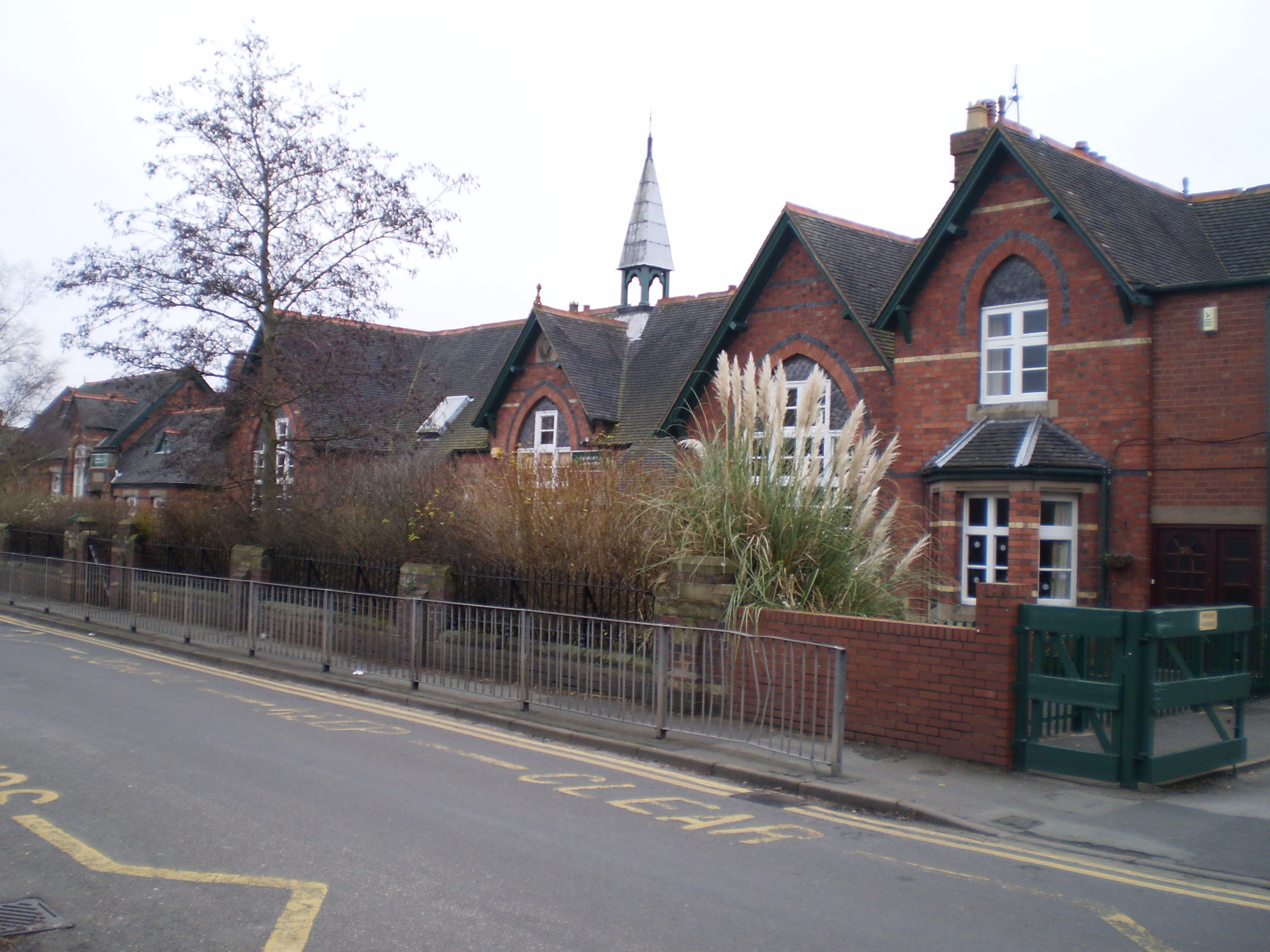
Newport Junior school

Newport has a full range of educational establishments, from primary schools to a university. All schools in the town have GCSE results above national averages, including the comprehensive school Burton Borough School which in recent years has undergone rapid improvement, leading it to achieve GCSE English results above national averages. There are also two selective schools with similar reputations of Newport Girls' High School and Haberdashers' Adams. Harper Adams University is located in the nearby village of Edgmond, and Keele University operates teaching rooms in the doctor's surgery for trainee student doctors. For Further Education students, the closest colleges to the town are Telford College of Arts and Technology and Stafford College, with buses running from the town to both colleges and to Shrewsbury College of Arts & Technology. Just outside the town is Edgmond Hall, used by Sandwell Metropolitan Borough Council for outdoor activities for school students.

Schools in Newport, Shropshire
Infant	Church Aston Infant School · Moorfield Primary School · St Peter & St Paul RC Primary School · Newport Infant School
Junior	Newport Junior School · Moorfield Junior School. Castle House School
Comprehensive	Burton Borough School
Secondary state grammar schools (with sixth form)	Newport Girls' High School & Haberdashers' Adams
Universities	Harper Adams University

== Transport ==
The town has been a well-used crossing point even before the creation of the settlement and sits on a historical crossing of the Via Devana.

The town became prominent as a coaching town on the Mail coach route between London, North Wales and Ireland as well being on a historic junction on the road from London to Chester and the East Midlands. This meant that the town grew around the different roads that cross the town. At the centre of the town is a large island with the church of St. Nicholas at one end and Central Square nightclub at the other, the High Street on one side and St Mary's Street on the other side. The two streets come together at one end in front of the nightclub at the junction with the A518 from Stafford which runs through the town on an east–west route from Stafford to Telford. They come together at the other end by the truncated Shrewsbury and Newport Canal beyond which is the junction with the A519 road from Eccleshall and Stoke-on-Trent. At the southern end of the High Street is another junction where the A519 road leaves on its way to Telford.

Before the road network, the canal was the main link to the town. It is not currently connected to the national network, but there are plans to restore it to a fully working canal by the Shrewsbury and Newport Canals Trust, linking into the national canal network at Norbury Junction to the east of the A41, which now borders the town to the east on a north–south by-pass route opened in early 1985 to ease the congestion on the High Street.

The town sits around 9 miles (14 km) from the M54, and 11 miles (18 km) from the M6 Motorways.

=== Buses ===
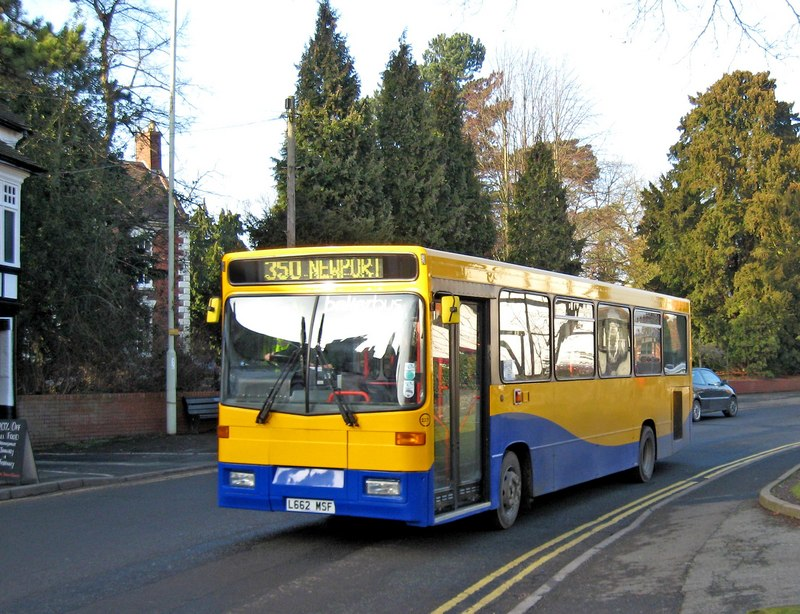
Bakerbus Service 350 Hanley to Newport

The town is served by buses between Stafford and Telford and a service from Shrewsbury. Arriva Midlands is the main service provider for the town with additional shoppers services operated by Wrekin Rider, the bus operating arm of Telford and Wrekin District Council.

=== Rail ===
The former Stafford to Shrewsbury Line once ran through the town, but due to cuts Newport (Salop) railway station was closed in September 1964 and has now been dismantled. The line has been restored to Hortonwood, and it is possible that the next phase could be to reconnect the town to the railway network. This has been given a boost by the town council, who are currently in talks with Stafford Borough Council to discuss the link to Stafford. The line is in the top 36 'Lines that should reopen' listing published by the Campaign for Better Transport, and with the Telford International Freight Park in Donnington, Telford needing better connections to the east coast and Scotland, this could mean a line going past the town and on towards Gnosall and Stafford.

=== Cycling ===
Newport is on National Route 55 and Regional Route 75 of the Sustrans National Cycle Network. Cycle maps for these routes are available from the Newport Visitor Information centre, located in the Pop Up Shop on Wellington Road. The cycleway to Stafford runs on the former railway line and will be completed by the end of 2014.

=== Walking ===
The town sits on the Way for the Millennium walkway which is 40 miles (64 km) long, and heads toward Stafford, passing through several villages on the way.

== Sport and clubs ==
Newport Town FC play in the West Midlands (Regional) League (Division Two) and have a reserve side ("Edgmond Rangers") who play in the Mercian Regional Football League (Division Two). Newport Town were the league champions of the Shropshire County Premier Football League for the 2011–12 season, earning them promotion. Since promotion in 2012, the senior team now plays its home games at Harper Adams University College in Edgmond and the reserve team also play in Edgmond. Previously they played their home games at Shuker Field, a 3-acre (1.2 ha) field close to the Burton Borough School in Newport itself.

The Newport Crown Green Bowls club plays in the Premier Division of Shropshire after promotion from the Mid Shropshire division one as well as many other division and leagues.

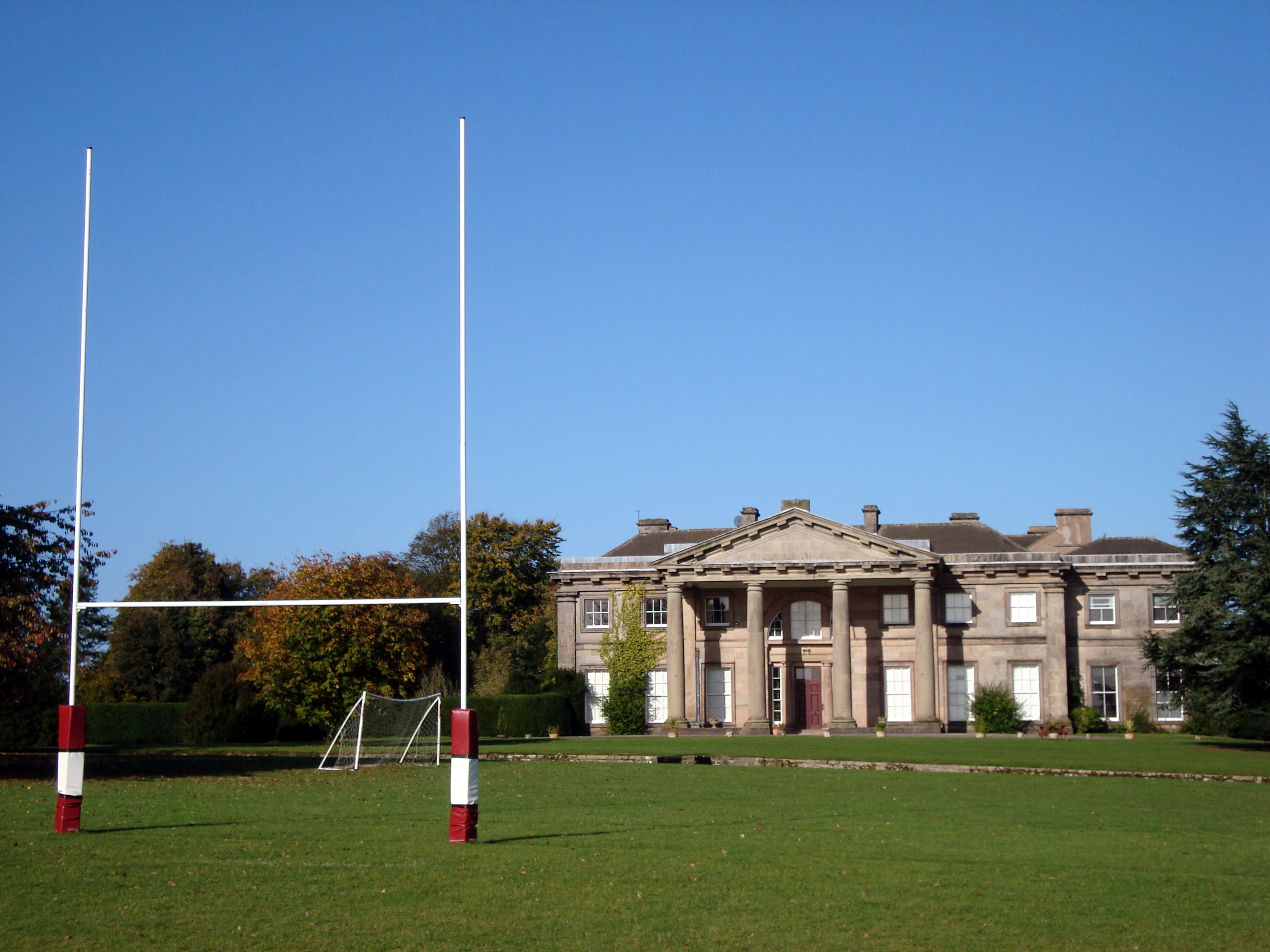
Longford Hall.

Newport (Salop) Rugby Union Football Club is the highest-ranked rugby club in Shropshire, and the main club in the town

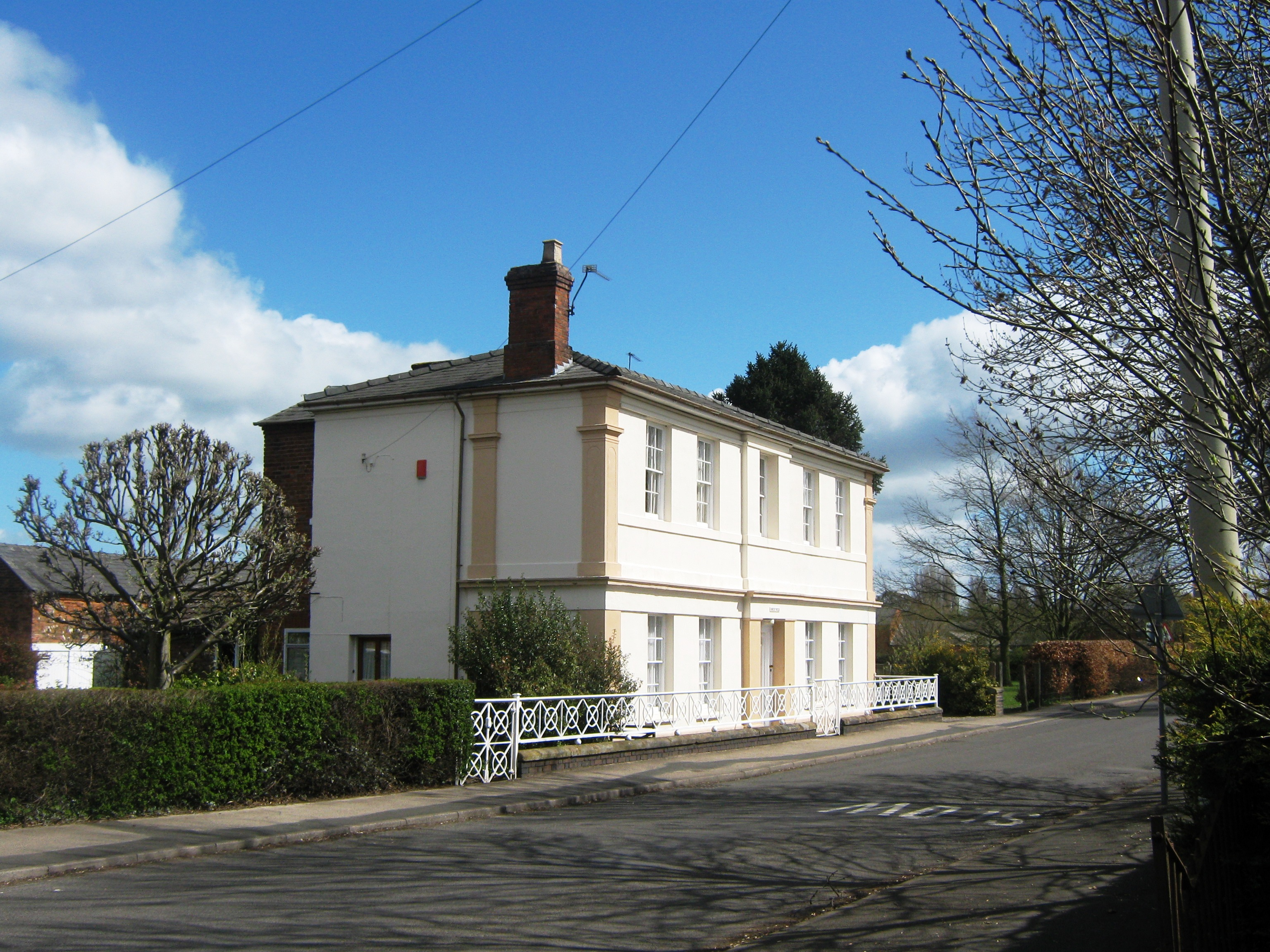
Audley Villa, First built as Newport race course.

Newport Cricket Club plays in the Shropshire Premier Cricket League Premier Division.

On 2009, the £200,000 Newport Sk8 park was formally opened by Princess Anne. The skatepark is the largest in Shropshire and the largest W/ramp in Britain.

265(Chetwynd) Air Training Corps are also based just outside of Newport, on the Chetwynd Deer Park.

=== Lilleshall Sports Centre ===
Lilleshall Hall - formerly the country retreat and hunting lodge for the Duke of Sutherland, situated just 2 miles (3.2 km) from the centre of Newport and is now home to Lilleshall National Sports Centre.

== Notable residents ==
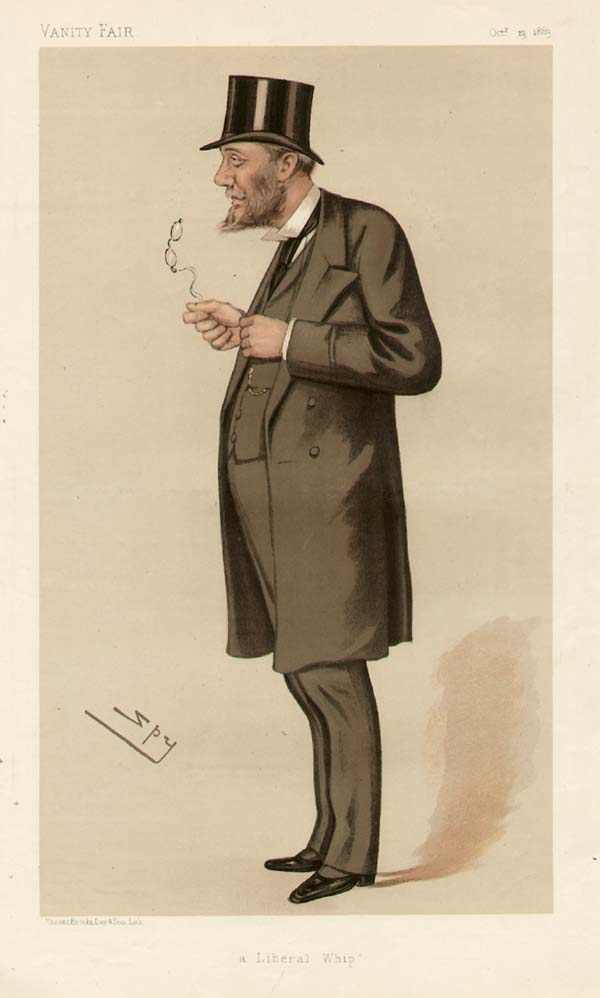
Cartoon of Charles Cecil Cotes in Vanity Fair, 1883

William Kenyon-Slaney, 1906

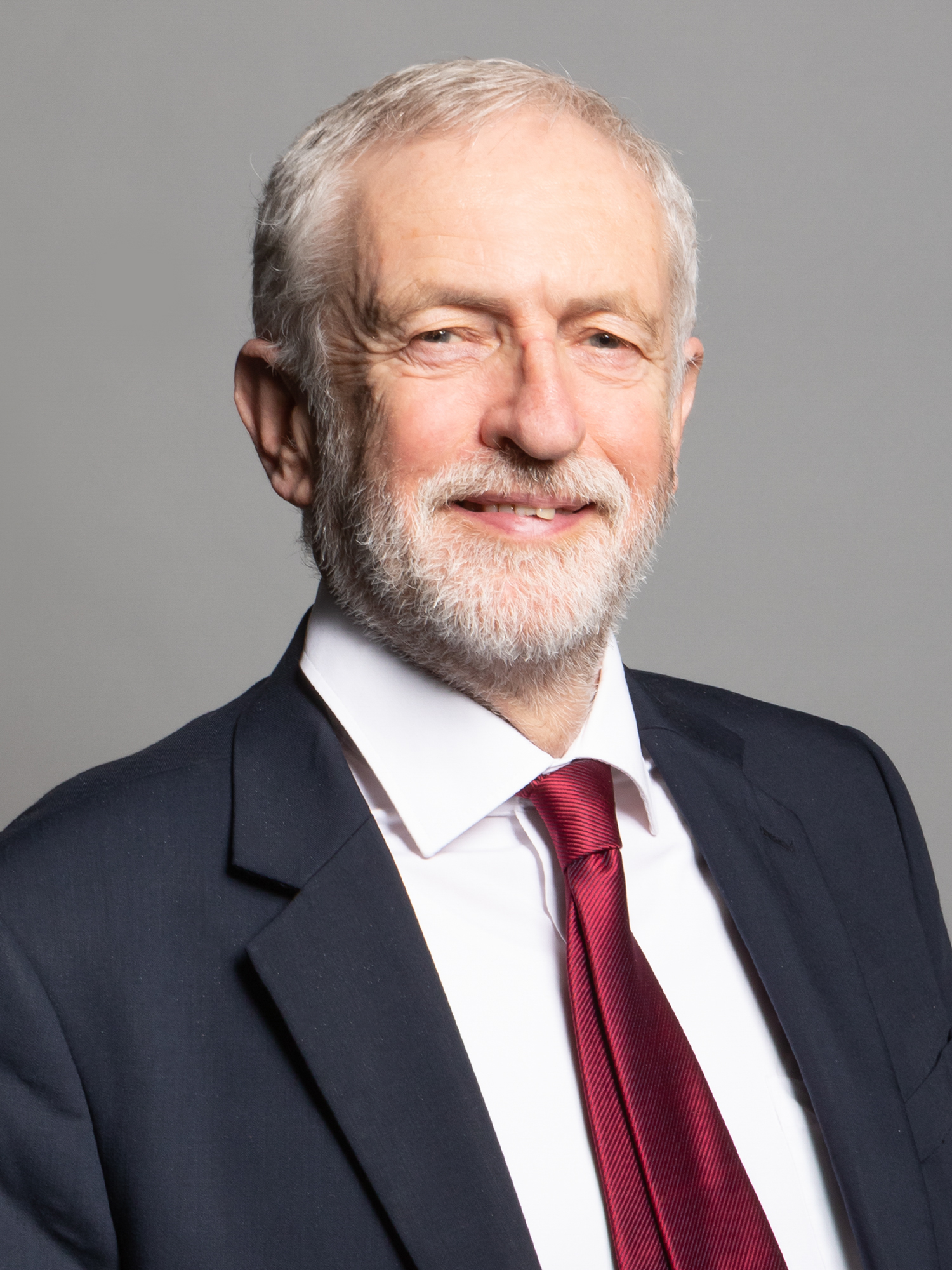
Official portrait of Jeremy Corbyn, 2020

- Robert Puleston, (born in Newport) – brother-in-law and supporter of Owain Glyndŵr, against King Henry IV
- Richard Barnfield (1574 in Norbury, Staffordshire – 1620) – English poet, obscure though close relationship with William Shakespeare, brought up in Edgmond nearby.
- William Adams, (1585 in Newport – 1661) – London Haberdasher founded Haberdashers' Adams in 1656
- Thomas Brown (1662 in Newport or Shifnal – 1704) – satirist
- John Meeson Parsons (1798 in Newport – 1870) – art collector and director of the Shropshire Union Railway
- William Ick (1800 in Newport – 1844) English botanist and geologist
- James Brown (1812–1881), Roman Catholic Bishop of Shrewsbury, 1851 to 1881, lived Salter's Hall, near Newport.
- Arabella Elizabeth Roupell (1817 in Newport – 1914) – English flower painter
- James Hain Friswell (1825 in Newport – 1878) – English essayist and novelist
- Charles Cecil Cotes (1846 Woodcote Hall – 1898) – British landowner and Liberal politician
- Colonel William Slaney Kenyon-Slaney (1847–1908) – sportsman, soldier and MP for Newport 1886 to 1908.
- Percy John Heawood (1861 in Newport – 1955) – British mathematician
- James Edward Quibell, (1867 in Newport – 1935) – Egyptologist
- Mary Mercer (1883–1945), politician, the first woman and first Labour Party Mayor of Birkenhead.
- Frederick Phillips Raynham (1893–1954), office worker at Harper Adams College and early aviation pilot
- Norman Jones (1932 - 2013) - screen actor, educated in and lived latterly at Newport
- Sir Peter James Bottomley (born 1944 in Newport) – British Conservative MP for Worthing West 1997 to 2024
- Ozzy Osbourne (1948–2025) - Heavy metal rock singer, owned a bar in St Mary's Street in the late 1970s, run by his then wife Thelma. It was sold. In 2013 it was revived under name of Ozzy's Sports Bar in his honour.
- Jeremy Corbyn, (born 1949) – Labour MP for Islington North since 1983, Leader of the Labour Party from 2015 to 2020. Lived as child in Pave Lane and attended Castle House School and Haberdashers' Adams
- Peter Butler (born 1951 in Newport) – British Conservative MP for North East Milton Keynes from 1992 to 1997
- M. J. Bassett (born c. 1965 in Newport) – is an English screenwriter and film director of Solomon Kane
- Michael Beasley (born 1968), curate at St Nicholas Church, Newport in 1999-2003, later Bishop of Bath and Wells.
- Robert Hendy-Freegard, (born 1971), barman in Newport, conman, impostor who masqueraded as MI5 agent
- Craig Phillips, (born 1971) – winner of Big Brother 2000, lived in Newport
- James Sutton (born 1983), actor, played John Paul McQueen in Hollyoaks, brought up in Newport

=== Sport ===
- Thomas Collins (1841 – 1934 in Newport), first-class cricketer for Cambridge University from 1861 and 1863 and headmaster of Newport Grammar School from 1871 to in 1903
- Herbert Elliott (1887 in Newport – 1973) – English cricketer, played for Essex County Cricket Club
- Reuben (Ben) Jones (1932 in Newport – 1990), equestrian, team gold medallist at the 1968 Summer Olympics
- Paul Bracewell, (born 1962) – footballer, played 587 games, mainly for Stoke and Sunderland
- Adam Proudlock, (born 1981) – youth team coach for Newport Town, played 310 games, mainly for Wolves & Stockport County F.C.
- David Pallett (born 1990 in Newport) – darts player for Professional Darts Corporation, lives in Newport
- Ben Rowlings (born 1996) – British Paralympic athlete who competes in the T34 classification, lives in Newport

== Surrounding villages and hamlets ==
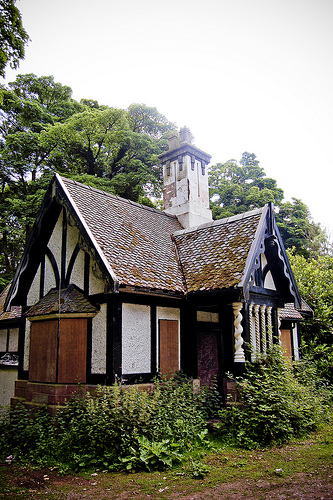
Chetwyind Lodge, leading to Chetwynd Park estate

The town is surrounded by many different small villages, ranging from the larger settlements of Edgmond and Lilleshall to smaller hamlets all of which are joined to the town or separated only by a short distance. Most of these settlements are seen as parts of the town's catchment zone. Due to Newport's proximity to the county border, a number include Newport in their postal address, despite being situated in Staffordshire.

The following villages and settlements can be found near Newport:

- Adeney
- Chetwynd
- Chetwynd Aston
- Church Aston
- Edgmond
- Forton, (Staffordshire)
- Gnosall (Staffordshire)
- Great Chatwell (Staffordshire)
- Longford
- Meretown
- Moreton, Staffordshire
- Outwoods (Staffordshire)
- Pave Lane
- Stockton, Shropshire
- Tibberton
- Wilbrighton (Staffordshire)

== See also ==
- Listed buildings in Newport, Shropshire
- Shropshire Star Newport Nocturne
- Shrewsbury and Newport Canal
- Newport Show
- Newport (Shropshire) (UK Parliament constituency)
