= Madam Pigott =

Ghost in Shropshire, England

Madam Pigott or Madam Piggott is a ghost supposed to haunt the area of Chetwynd Park and the surrounding market town of Newport, Shropshire. She bears similarities to other White Ladies in British folklore.

== The tale ==
The Chetwynd Park estate was once home to the Pigott family. Squire Pigott was a neglectful husband. When Madam Pigott did fall pregnant, the birth was not an easy one. Her doctor explained to Squire Pigott that he was unable to save the lives of both his wife and baby. Upon hearing this, the squire said only that "one should lop the root to save the branch." However, the doctor's efforts were unsuccessful and both mother and child died.

Madame Pigott's spirit returned, unable to rest due to her husband's words. Every night at midnight, she appeared from a skylight of the Old Rectory in Chetwynd. Some of her favorite places were Cheney Hill, which became known as Madame Pigott's Hill, and a twisted tree-root called Madam Pigott's Armchair. She might be seen walking the road between Edgmond and Newport or sitting and combing her baby's hair. If a rider passed through the area, Madam Pigott would leap onto the horse behind him. Her spirit was unable to cross water, so when the rider crossed a stream, she would let go.

The spirit was so well known in the area that twelve churchmen assembled to read Psalms and exorcise her. All but one of the clergymen gave in to exhaustion, leaving only Mr. Foy of Edgmond to continue reading. The prayers worked, but years after Foy's death, the ghost returned and had to be "laid" once more.

Georgina Frederica Jackson, who recorded the tale, mentioned an informant living in 1883 who claimed to have personally seen the ghost. "Madame Piggott" sightings have been recorded as recently as 2014. She has been said to appear around the A41 road between Newport and Market Drayton.

== Other versions ==
In a Romani version of the tale, the ghost is "Miss Pigott," who died thrown from a horse at Chetwynd End. People successfully "laid" her by trapping her spirit in a bottle and throwing it into Chetwynd Pool. During a skating accident some time later, the bottle resurfaced and broke. Miss Pigott returned and plagued riders by leaping onto their horses. Twelve priests set out to exorcise her. Eleven were exhausted, but the oldest priest encouraged them and they managed to bottle the spirit a second time.

The Silky of Black Heddon is a similar White Lady. She had a preferred tree known as the Silky's Chair. She was also said to lurk in deserted roads, where she would climb on behind passing horsemen.

== See also ==
- List of ghosts
- Madam Koi Koi
