= Thomas Collins (cricketer, born 1841) =

English cricketer

Thomas Collins (31 January 1841 – 16 March 1934) played first-class cricket for Cambridge University in three matches between 1861 and 1863 and in many other games that have not been designated first-class. He was born in Warwick, Warwickshire and died at Newport, Shropshire aged 93.

== Early life ==
Collins was born at Warwick, son of Thomas Collins, a lawyer who became county court registrar at Bury St Edmunds. Collins was educated at King Edward VI School in Bury St Edmunds and at Christ's College, Cambridge University. He graduated as a Bachelor of Arts in 1863, becoming a Master of Arts in 1868. Collins also studied law, being admitted to the Inner Temple in 1863 and called to the Bar in 1868, but never practised. He became a schoolmaster at King Edward VI's School, Birmingham from 1863 to 1870, and was then headmaster of Newport Grammar School in Newport, Shropshire, from 1871 to his retirement in 1903.

== Cricket career ==
Collins was a medium-paced bowler who bowled, according to a memoir after his death in 1934, "with swerve and swing from leg and accomplished many notable performances in those days of low scoring". His bowling is credited, in this obituary in The Times, as a factor in the 1864 decision to allow overarm bowling, though the recorded figures of the match in question, the University Match of 1863, do not corroborate the story.

Overarm bowling, in which the ball is delivered from the bowler's hand from a height above the line of the shoulder, was specifically outlawed under the amendments to the laws that permitted roundarm bowling; the ban was increasingly challenged, notably by the professional bowler Edgar Willsher, who theatrically led his professional colleagues from the pitch when no-balled for "high" bowling in 1862. The Times obituary of Collins states that there was a similar incident involving him in the match between Cambridge University and Oxford at Lord's: "Collins dismissed such famous batsmen as R. D. Walker and R. A. H. Mitchell early in the innings, and then was no-balled five times in succession for delivering the ball above his shoulder. This spoiled Collins for the match. He did not get another wicket, and failed as a bat, being dismissed for nought and one." The report goes on: "Collins regarded his bad luck on his only appearance for Cambridge against Oxford as a distinct misfortune which he did not deserve to undergo, and his being 'called' went a long way towards the removal of all restrictions as to the height of the ball when delivered." Unfortunately for this version of events, the scorecard does not match the story: there was only one no-ball in Oxford's first innings. There is also no mention of such an incident in the contemporary report of the match in The Times. However, the obituary version of the match and of Collins' alleged role in the law change was reprinted pretty much unaltered in the 1935 edition of Wisden Cricketers' Almanack.

Collins played non-first-class cricket for Suffolk between 1862 and 1869; at the time of his death he was the oldest former University Match player and in 1933 he was granted honorary membership of the Marylebone Cricket Club (MCC) on account of his longevity. In Shropshire he was captain of Newport Cricket Club for some 20 years.

== Other sports ==
In addition to cricket, Collins also played billiards for Cambridge University against Oxford. He introduced rugby union football on the curriculum at Newport Grammar School after arriving in 1871, reputedly starting organised play of that sport in the district.

== Life outside sport ==
Collins remained living in Newport after retiring from teaching, and active in its public life. In 1907 he was serving as an elected member of Newport Urban District Council, on which he sat for six years; manager of Newport Grammar School; Chairman of the local Newport Gas Company and trustee of its savings bank, and director of Newport Markets Company for six years. In 1904 he was honoured by being made a Freeman and Liveryman of the Worshipful Company of Haberdashers. In 1908 he was appointed Justice of the Peace for the county of Shropshire.

Collins was a Freemason, being the second member initiated of Newport's local Audley Lodge of Freemasons, number 1896.

== Personal life ==
Collins married firstly, in 1871, to Emily Mary, daughter of C.W. Elkington of Birmingham, with whom he had one son, and a daughter who survived him. Following his first wife's death, he married secondly to Lota, daughter of a Doctor Graves, of Cookstown, County Tyrone, in Ireland.

He died in March 1934 aged 93 at his home, Musgrove House in High Street, Newport, and was buried in Newport General Cemetery.

== Publications ==
Collins was author of six educational books, including:

- Latin Unseen
- Greek Unseen
- Hints and Grammar Papers
- Easy Latin Prose
- School and Sport
