= Herbert Elliott =

English cricketer and schoolmaster

Personal information
- Full name: Herbert Denis Edleston Elliott
- Born: 30 March 1887; Newport, Shropshire, England
- Died: 26 April 1973 (aged 86); Bognor Regis, Sussex, England
- Batting: Unknown
- Bowling: Unknown

Domestic team information
- Years: Team
- 1913: Essex

Career statistics
Competition	First-class
Matches	2
Runs scored	3
Batting average	0.75
100s/50s	–/–
Top score	3
Balls bowled	138
Wickets	1
Bowling average	107.00
5 wickets in innings	–
10 wickets in match	–
Best bowling	1/67
Catches/stumpings	1/–
- Source: Cricinfo, 27 October 2011

Herbert Denis Edleston Elliott (30 March 1887 – 26 April 1973) was an English schoolmaster and cricketer. Elliott's batting and bowling styles are unknown. He was born at Newport, Shropshire and educated in the town at Newport School.

Elliott made two first-class appearances for Essex against Kent and Northamptonshire in the 1913 County Championship, scoring just three runs and taking a single wicket.

Elliott served in World War I, holding in December 1914 the temporary rank of second lieutenant. By 1916 he still held the rank of second lieutenant; it was in that year that he resigned his commission from the King's Shropshire Light Infantry due to ill health. At some point after this his heath recovered enough for him to serve in a training capacity in the Territorial Force. By July 1919 he had been promoted to captain in recognition of his command of the Malvern College Contingent of the Officers' Training Corps. He was still the Division Captain of the Malvern College Contingent by 1923, in November of that year he was promoted to major.

He died at Bognor Regis, Sussex on 26 April 1973.
