= Henry Lark Pratt =

English painter (1805–1873)

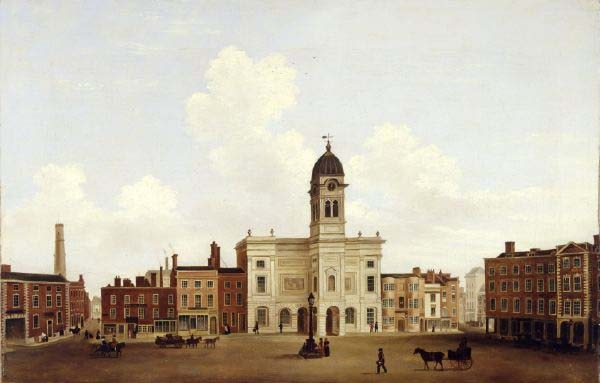
The Market Place in Derby in 1850

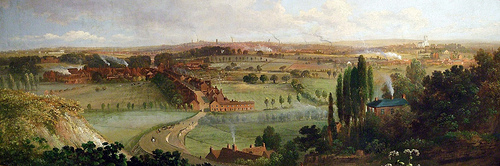
Etruria From Basford Bank

Henry Lark Pratt (1805–1873) was an English painter who trained in the porcelain industry.

== Biography ==
Pratt was born in the parish of St Peters in Derby on 16 February 1805 and he was apprenticed into the porcelain trade at the Derby Factory at the age of about 12. Pratt would have completed his apprenticeship in 1824. He stayed in Derby until 1830. After that he worked for Mintons from 1831 to November 1836 as a painter. Six months before he left Mintons he married Margaret Windsor of Stoke on Trent. Henry and Margaret had children with the first in 1837 and the first five in Stoke. A son was born in 1839 who was given his father's full name, causing confusion when he also became an artist.

In 1841 Pratt described his profession as artist in the census and in 1844 he started taking an interest in oil painting. He was then employed to sketch baronial halls in nearby counties. He enjoyed painting and was keen on landscapes and particularly the valley of Dovedale on the Derbyshire and Staffordshire border. Patrons of his art included the Dukes of Devonshire and Queen Victoria who bought a dinner service with views of Windsor Castle that Pratt had painted.

He moved back to Derby in 1851 where he was still making a living from his artistic skills that kept his wife and their nine children. In 1861 he described himself as a "Landscape painter on China." He died on 3 March 1873 in Stoke on Trent.

== Works ==
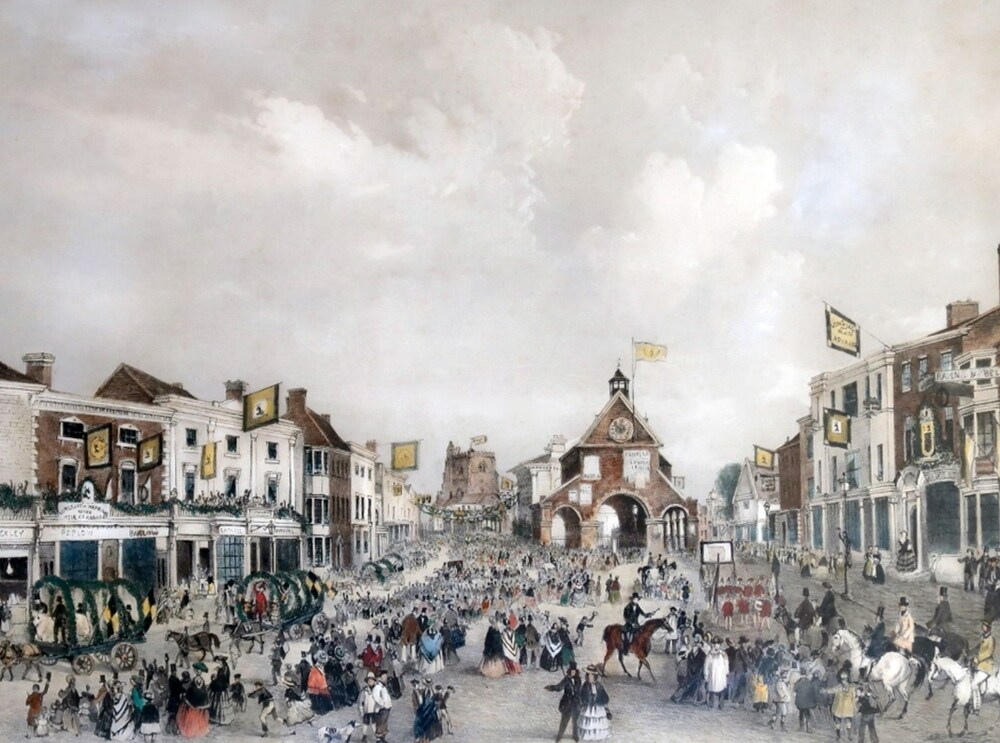
tinted engraving showing Newport High Street, Shropshire, depicting celebrations at the time of the coming of age of Thomas Fletcher-Boughey on 25 April 1857.

Henry Lark Pratt has several paintings in his home town's art gallery as well as paintings at the gallery in Newcastle-under-Lyme.

== Son ==
Pratt's son Henry Lark Pratt changed his name to Hilton to try to avoid confusion with his father but this was to little effect as paintings are found that are signed "H.L.Pratt". Pratt (junior) went on to exhibit a painting at the Royal Academy in 1867 and six years later he had another painting accepted by the Society of British Artists. He died in 1875 at the age of 36.
