= Boughey baronets =

Title in the Baronetage of Great Britain

- Escutcheon of the Boughey baronets of Newcastle-under-Lyme
- Creation date: 1798
- Status: extant
- Motto: Nec quaerere nec spernere honorem, Neither to seek nor to despise distinction

The Fletcher, later Boughey baronetcy, of Newcastle-under-Lyme and of Betley both in the County of Stafford, is a title in the Baronetage of Great Britain. It was created on 24 August 1798 for Thomas Fletcher, of Betley Court, Staffordshire, High Sheriff of Staffordshire in 1783 and 1789 and Deputy Lieutenant of the county. He was the son of Thomas Fletcher the elder (1717–1783), a banker and financier of pottery manufacture at Shelton. The grant of the title to the younger Thomas Fletcher recognised his opposition during the 1790s to Granville Leveson-Gower, 1st Marquess of Stafford, Whig patron of the constituency of Newcastle-under-Lyme, at the time generally considered a close borough.

== 2nd Baronet ==
The elder Thomas Fletcher married Elizabeth Fenton, granddaughter of George Boughey, of Audley, Staffordshire, whose son's will provided for the 1st Baronet's son John, to inherit the Audley estate. In compliance with the will the 2nd Baronet inherited from George Boughey (1711–1788), a solicitor, and assumed by sign-manual the surname of Boughey, in 1805. He later sat as Member of Parliament for Newcastle-under-Lyme (1812) and Staffordshire (1820–23). He was succeeded by his eldest son, Thomas, the 3rd Baronet, who was himself succeeded in turn by five of his eight sons, none of whom provided a male heir.

== Fletcher, later Boughey baronets, of Newcastle-under-Lyme (1798) ==
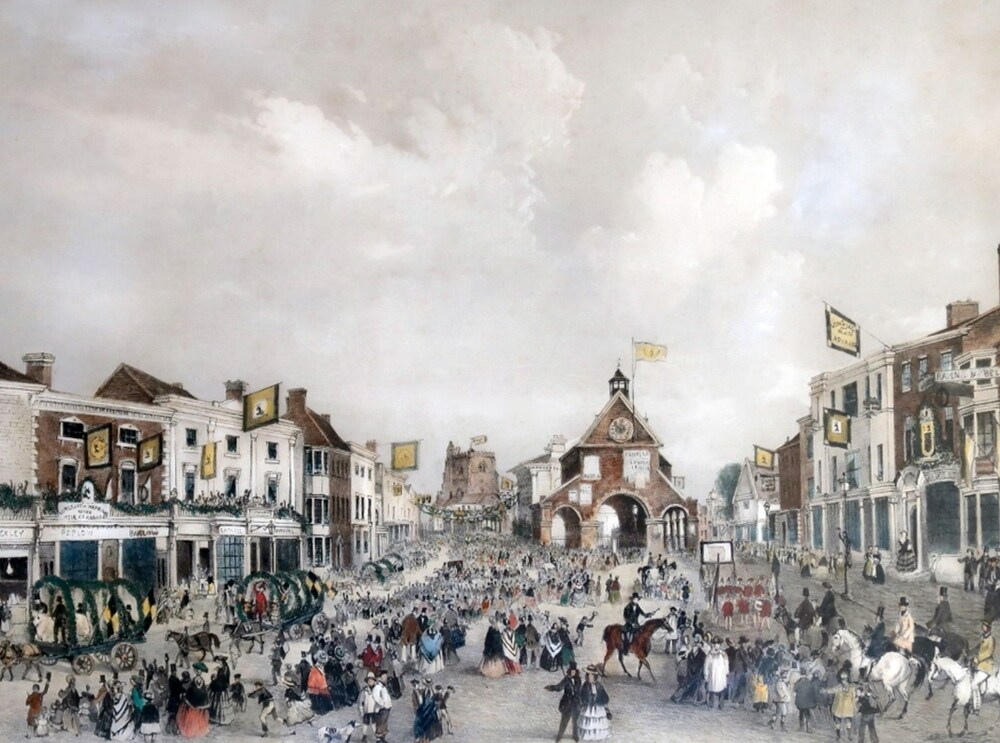
Tinted engraving showing Newport High Street in 1857, by Henry Lark Pratt, depicting celebrations at the time of the coming of age of Sir Thomas Fletcher Fenton Boughey, 4th Baronet on 25 April 1857.

- Sir Thomas Fletcher, 1st Baronet (1747–1812)
- Sir John Fenton Boughey, 2nd Baronet (1784–1823)
- Sir Thomas Fletcher Fenton Boughey, 3rd Baronet (1809–1880). He served as High Sheriff of Staffordshire in 1832.
- Sir Thomas Fletcher Fenton Boughey, 4th Baronet (1836–1906). Son of the 3rd Baronet, he was High Sheriff of Staffordshire in 1898. He died childless in 1906 and was succeeded by his younger brother, George, the 5th Baronet.
- Rev. Sir George Boughey, 5th Baronet (1837–1910). Rector of Forton 1863–1908. He died without male issue in 1910 and was succeeded by his younger brother, William, the 6th Baronet.
- Sir William Fletcher Boughey 6th Baronet (1840–1912). A Commander in the Royal Navy. He died childless in 1912 and was succeeded by his younger brother, Robert, the 7th Baronet.
- Reverend Sir Robert Boughey, 7th Baronet (1843–1921). Vicar of Betley (1826–1921). He died unmarried in 1921 and was succeeded by his younger brother, Francis, the 8th Baronet
- Sir Francis Boughey, 8th Baronet (1848–1927). Succeeded by his cousin.
- Sir George Menteth Boughey, CBE, 9th Baronet (1879–1959). He was in the Indian Civil Service and served as Under-Secretary to the Government of the Punjab from 1912 to 1913. He was succeeded by his second but only surviving son, Richard, the 10th Baronet.
- Sir Richard James Boughey, 10th Baronet (1925–1978). He was educated at Eton College and served in World War II as a lieutenant in the Coldstream Guards. His seat was at Ringmer Park, Ringmer, Sussex. He was High Sheriff of Sussex in 1964 and Deputy Lieutenant of the county. His second wife, Gillian Moubray, was sister-in-law to two Dukes, the Duke of Sutherland and the Duke of Richmond and Gordon.

As of 2026 the title is held by his eldest son, John, the 11th Baronet, who succeeded in 1978.

- Sir John George Fletcher Boughey, 11th Baronet (born 1959), a medical practitioner

The heir presumptive is the present holder's brother James Richard Boughey (born 1960).

== Extended family ==
- John Boughey (1845–1932), second son of George Fenton Fletcher Boughey, third son of 2nd Baronet, was a Major-General in the Wiltshire Regiment.
- The 8th Baronet was succeeded by his first cousin once removed, George, the 9th Baronet. He was the son of Colonel George Fletcher Ottley Boughey, eldest son of Lieutenant-Colonel George Fenton Fletcher Boughey, third son of the 2nd Baronet.

== Notes ==
Baronetage of Great Britain
Preceded by Calder baronets	Fletcher baronets of Newcastle-under-Lyme; 24 August 1798	Succeeded by Troubridge baronets
