= Chetwynd Park estate =

Estate in Shropshire, England

Coordinates: 52.791°N 2.393°W

The Chetwynd Park estate lies in the small village of Chetwynd on the outskirts of the town of Newport, Shropshire, England. The estate is positioned in a gap north of Newport, where the road having crossed the marshland, clings to a steep slope of the Scaur above the meadowlands of the River Meese, where it meets Lonco Brook, before widening out onto the north Shropshire plain.

The estate can trace its long history back to the Domesday records, which record a mill and two fisheries. Chetwynd was an important manor in Saxon times and was held by Leofric, Earl of Mercia, about 1050 though the current building was built in 1864 after the demolition of the older building.

In 1318 Sir John de Chetwynd was granted the right to hold a market and three-day fair on All Souls Day. (2 November).

From the 15th to the later 18th century Chetwynd was held by the Pigotts, one of whom (Elizabeth Pigott, daughter of Thomas Pigott) married Peter Corbett the great nephew of Sir Rowland Hill, publisher of the Geneva Bible. Charles I is recorded as staying at the estate during the English Civil War, in 1645.

Newport town has a ghost story a member of the Pigott family, namely Madam Pigott. The last of them, Robert, High Sheriff of Shropshire in 1774, sold the estate and moved to Geneva, later dying at Toulouse in 1794.

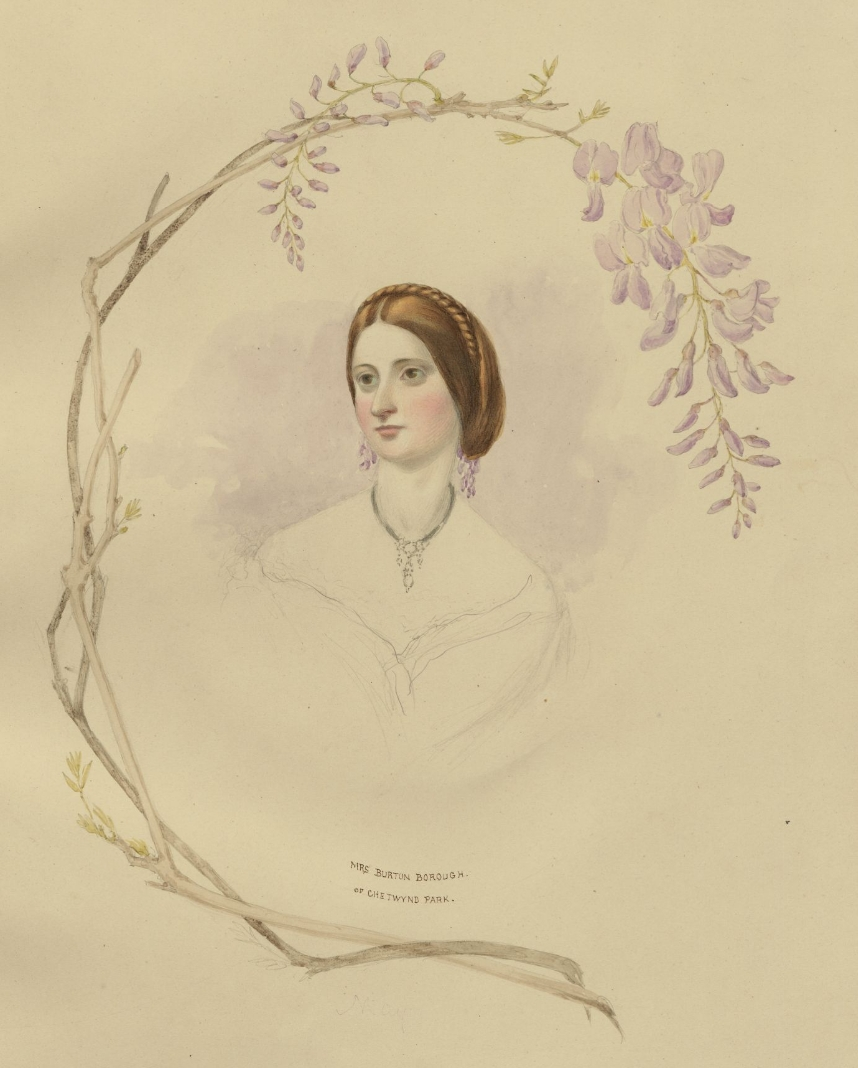
Mrs Burton Borough of Chetwynd Park c.1850s. Wife of J.C.B. Borough

The estate was then purchased by Thomas Borrow, member of a Derbyshire iron-founding family, who subsequently changed his name to Borough. Thomas, who moved to Chetwynd in 1803, was succeeded by his son John Charles Burton Borough, High Sheriff of Shropshire in 1844.

In the 1860s there was a major building campaign carried out by J.C.B. Borough. Chetwynd Hall was reworked as Chetwynd Park, and at the same time the church and rectory which stood in the grounds (the church just beside the hall) were demolished and replaced by new structures 250 metres to the southwest. Terraced lawns were laid out on the site of the old church, new gardens were designed, and the park was enlarged.

As the estate declined in the 20th century, Chetwynd Hall was demolished and replaced by a modern house in the 1960s. Next to the Hall lies the Church and a school house both built to replace earlier ones, respectively in 1865 and 1924. The school itself was moved from next to the hall to next to the gate house, to respect the privacy of the owners, and it covered Chetwynd and Sambrook from 1857 until 1959 when it became the village hall

The grounds of the hall have been cut down over the years with a quarter going to become Newport original show ground. Following the purchase of the Deer Park by Newport and District Agricultural Society, the old show ground was leased to Newport (Salop) Rugby Union Football Club, with another two quarters became the modern show ground at Chetwynd park or Deer park which is sited on the banks of Chetwynd Pool, which is a 20-acre (81,000 m^{2}) pool.

The Deer Park got its name from the herd of some 100 fallow deer which were brought up from Southern England, and is set up much like a Medieval deer park. Following the death of the life tenant, Mrs M Borough, in 1987, the Estate was left to the University of Oxford and Charterhouse School and in 1988, the whole of the estate was sold, with the Deer Park being bought by Newport & District Agricultural Society, who run the Newport Show. The society set about the task of restoring the Park to its former glory and at the same time, creating what is acknowledged to be one of the most beautiful show grounds in the country. In addition, the society has developed the educational potential of the deer park by building a classroom facility known as The Lodge in 2013 and as a result, many local schools and community groups as well as Harper Adams University visit the deer park for educational purposes.

== See also ==
- Newport Show
- Chetwynd, Shropshire
- Chetwynd park
