= Chetwynd Park =

Landscape garden in Shropshire, England

- Interactive map of Chetwynd Park
- Type: Landscape garden, historic park
- Location: Chetwynd, Shropshire, England
- Coordinates: 52.764°N 2.396°W
- Owner: Newport & District Agricultural Society
- Website: www.newportshow.co.uk

Chetwynd Park is an 18th-century landscape garden with woodland, on the edge of Newport, Shropshire.

The park can trace its history back to 1388, when it lay southeast of Chetwynd Park estate. The country house is now lost, but the medieval deer park survives as an agricultural showground, used for Newport Show and other events. The deer park was probably established early in the 18th century, and elements of the pleasure grounds in the 1860s. The country house was built on the banks of the 20-acre Chetwynd Pool, a small lake thought to have formed in the same way as nearby Aqualate Mere.

In the 19th century, the park was filled with deciduous trees, including oak, beech, wych elm, horse chestnuts and Spanish chestnuts, and some crab apples. It was stocked with 115 Père David's deer. Before 1891, there was a great arboretum at Chetwynd, which provided cuttings to plant the new church's drive (Leach 1891, 367). J.C.B. Borough also added a strip of land east of the park and north of the Longford, and created a drive to run around the outer edge of that extension, leading from Chetwynd Park to a new lodge on the Longford. This lay opposite the north end of Park Pool. There were other lodges at the south end of the pool, and at the bottom of the drive to the park. The northern part of the park featured a stone icehouse, probably dating from the mid- to late 18th century.

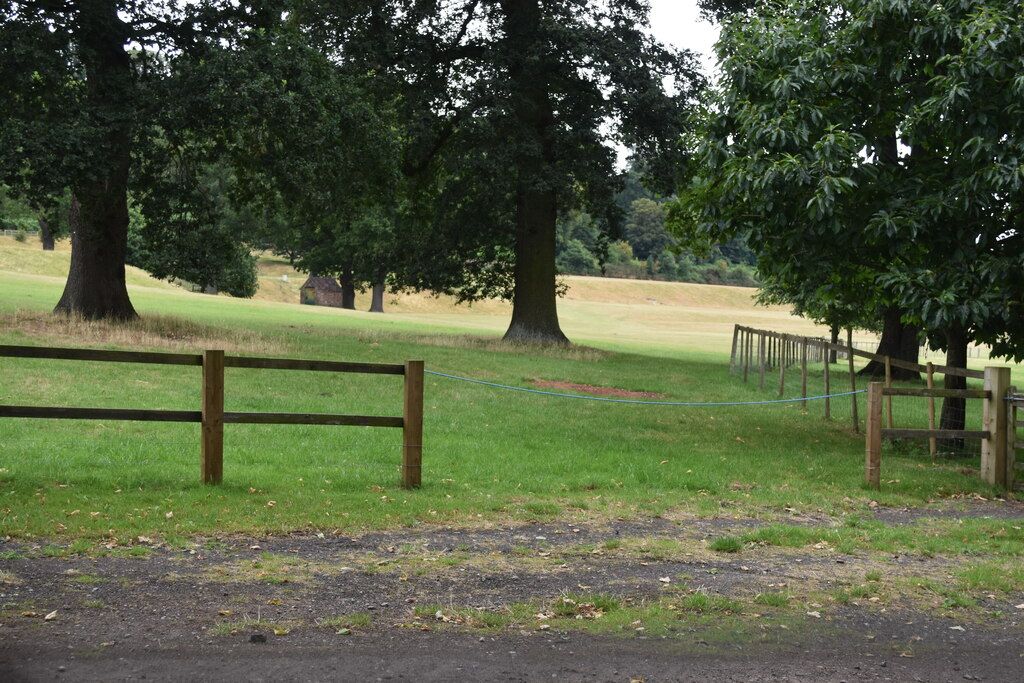
Chetwynd Park Deer Park, seen from the footpath

Animals that live around the pool are shoveler, wigeon and occasionally goosander. As well as the wildfowl on the pool other birds of interest include all three species of woodpecker, nuthatch, treecreeper, raven, and buzzard.

The deer park is owned by the Newport and District Agricultural Society. As well as being the home of Newport Show, which is held on the second Saturday in July each year, there are a number of other events held there each year. In addition, the society has developed the educational potential of the deer park by building a classroom facility known as The Lodge in 2013 and as a result, many local schools and community groups as well as Harper Adams University visit the deer park for educational purposes.

== See also ==
- Chetwynd Park estate
- Listed buildings in Chetwynd, Shropshire
- Newport, Shropshire
- Madam Pigott- The spirit that haunted the Park
