= The Royal Victoria Hotel =

Hotel in Newport, Shropshire, England

Coordinates: 52°46′12.3″N 2°22′47″W

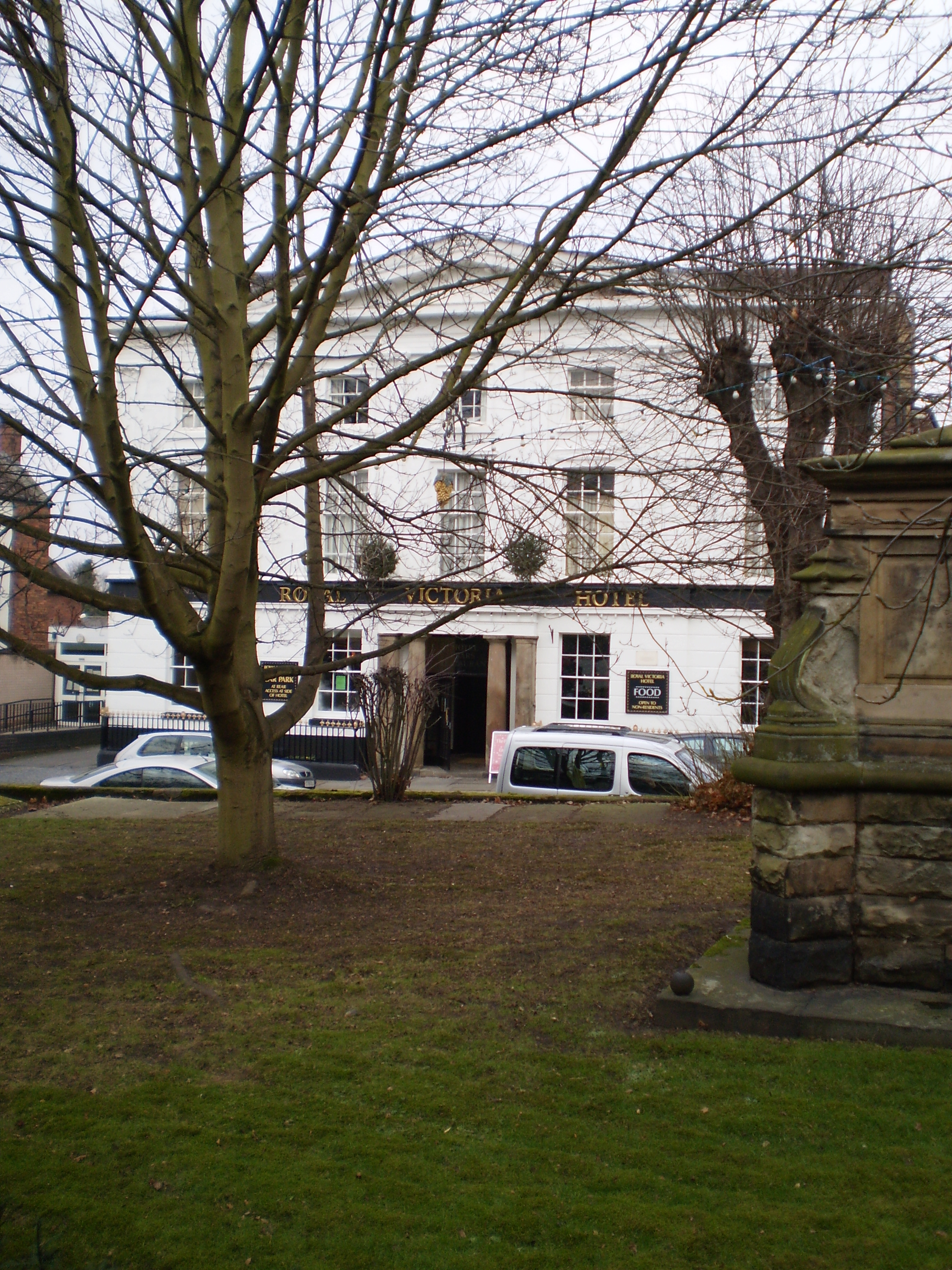
- Interactive map of the The Royal Victoria Hotel area

General information
- Location: St Mary's Street, Newport, Shropshire
- Opening: 1830
- Owner: Roger Brock

Technical details
- Floor count: 3

Other information
- Number of rooms: 25
- Number of restaurants: formerly 2
Designations
Listed Building – Grade II
- Designated: 29 April 1952

The Royal Victoria Hotel is a former hotel situated in Newport, Shropshire, England. It dates back to 1830 and gains its name from Queen Victoria, who visited the hotel in 1832 as Princess Victoria of Kent. It is a Grade II listed building. The building has been extended over time and operated as a hotel and wedding and meeting venue before closing in 2015. The owner has sought to convert it to flats.

== History ==
The hotel was originally called the Union, and built on the site of the Bear Inn. Local people subscribed to the building project of the new Union, which was to be the principal hotel in the town, built with the then fashionable five bays and two and a half storeys surmounted by a very shallow pediment. The first manager was William Liddle, who came from the Red Lion in Winchester. It was renamed in 1832 after the Princess Victoria visited it in 1832 and she herself declared that it would now be called 'The Royal Victoria Hotel'. She gifted the hotel with a pair of tortoise shells to commemorate the visit.

The Royal Victoria Hotel grew to the rear after the demolition of factories and workshops which had been built behind it. It was further extended in 1910 with the addition of a ballroom and cocktail bar. A second entrance from Water Lane was created for the use of people coming from the canal area, with Newport being on the main route to North Wales and Ireland. Many notable people stayed in the hotel over the years, but a fire in 1974 destroyed most of the photographs and memorabilia; however, it is believed that among the names to stay in the hotel were James Hain Friswell, Oliver Lodge and Charles Stewart Parnell. It became a Grade II listed building in 1952.

The hotel reopened in 2008 under new management after a renovation. closed in 2014, briefly reopening in 2015 before closing again after being purchased by Town Centre Properties, a development company headed by Roger Brock.

In 2017 Brock sought permission from the local authority Telford and Wrekin District Council to redevelop the building as seven flats, retaining the facade while demolishing the rear extension and two cottages. Planning permission for conversion into twelve flats was granted in 2018, and for 17 apartments in 2021. The building was placed under scaffolding in 2019, but work did not proceed, with delays blamed on the discovery of asbestos, planning issues including a dispute over parking, and the COVID-19 pandemic. The vacant building continued to deteriorate and health and safety inspectors determined it to be unsafe, instituted a safety exclusion zone by closing a major road, and obtained a court order requiring necessary work. In February 2023 Brock announced that the expense of repairs was now too high and he wished to demolish the hotel. Telford and Wrekin District Council refused permission for delisting and demolition. The required repairs were not made and after twice intervening to make the building safe, in December 2023 the council decided to compulsorily purchase the building. The council made further urgent repairs in 2024–25 and as of April 2026, after completing further repairs needed to stabilise the building, were still pursuing the option of compulsory purchase.

== Architecture ==
The hotel is built in Regency style of stuccoed stone with a rusticated ground floor and quoins, above which is a frieze and a cornice. At the top is a moulded eaves cornice, and the roof is tiled. There are three storeys and five bays that are separated by pilasters with decorative capitals, and above the middle three bays is a pediment. The central doorway has a Tuscan porch, and the windows are sashes.

== See also ==
- Listed buildings in Newport, Shropshire
