= St Nicholas Church, Newport =

Coordinates: 52.7696°N 2.3792°W

St Nicholas, Newport
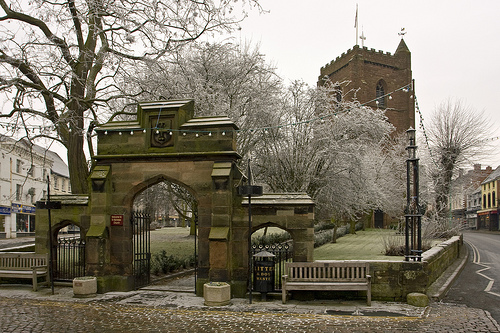
- The churchyard
- St Nicholas, Newport
- OS grid reference: SJ 74505 19186
- Country: England
- Denomination: Church of England
- Website: stnicholasnewport.co.uk

History
- Status: Parish Church

Architecture
- Functional status: Active

Administration
- Diocese: Diocese of Lichfield
- Archdeaconry: Archdeaconry of Salop
- Deanery: Edgmond & Shifnal
- Parish: Newport with Longford

Clergy
- Vicar: The Revd Merewyn Smith

St Nicholas's Church is an Anglican church in the market town of Newport, Shropshire, England lying within the Diocese of Lichfield. It is dedicated to St Nicholas, the patron saint of fishermen. The church is a Grade II* listed building.

It is of Early English and Perpendicular architecture. The church sits on an island in the centre of the town and is the main focal point for miles around. The buttressed tower dates from 1360, but the site had been used since the 13th century in the times of Henry I.

== History ==
The church was built in the 12th century with the tower being rebuilt in 1360. Thomas Draper bought the church from the Abbot of Shrewsbury in 1452 but it was not until 1700 that it gained its land and the rectory was endowed. The red brick north and south aisles were added in the 18th century. Galleries and gas lighting was added in 1837. The chancel was rebuilt in 1866. The church has been restored twice, the south side in 1883 and the north side from 1890 by John Norton. The west porch was built in 1904, a gift from Lady Boughey.

In 1912, politician Enoch Powell was baptised at the church where his parents previously had married in 1909.

In 1998 the Vicar, Roy Hibbert, was found guilty of fraud after overcharging parishioners for funerals and other services. For the 2019 Remembrance Day 200 poppies were knitted for the church.

=== Notable clergy ===
- Michael Beasley, assistant curate in 1999-2003 - later Bishop of Bath and Wells.

== Architecture ==
The sandstone building consists of a chancel, south chapel, nave with aisles and a west tower. The stained glass includes a window in the chancel by Morris & Co. with Burne-Jones figures. One in the south chapel is by Charles Eamer Kempe.

The north west corner of the nave, known locally as the "Longford Corner", contains a stained glass window by Christopher Whall in memory of two brothers of the Leake family killed in the First World War and a wooden parish war memorial plaque to local dead from the same war that were moved here from the former parish church at nearby Longford which closed in 1981. Near this corner is a brass plaque to Captain Walter Rowlands Roberts, Royal Army Medical Corps, who was killed in the Dardanelles in 1915.

The tower has 8 bells hung from wooden headstocks. Five of the bells were cast by Thomas Mears of the Whitechapel Bell Foundry in London in 1812. The two most recent were cast by John Taylor & Co of Loughborough in 1952.

In the churchyard is a sandstone memorial cross with brass plaques commemorating the men from the town who lost their lives in World War I and World War II.

== See also ==
- Grade II* listed buildings in Telford and Wrekin
- Listed buildings in Newport, Shropshire
