= Haberdashers' Adams =

Boarding school in Newport, Shropshire, UK

Haberdashers' Adams Grammar School
- Coat of arms of the Haberdashers' Company

Location
- High Street; Newport, Shropshire, TF10 7BD; UK; 52.7697°N 2.381°W

Information
- Former names: The Free Grammar School; Mr Adams' Free Grammar School; Newport Grammar School; Adams' Grammar School
- Type: Boarding school Academy
- Mottoes: Serve and Obey; Traditional Values, Modern Approach
- Established: 1656; 370 years ago
- Founder: William Adams
- Department for Education URN: 137446 Tables
- Ofsted: Reports
- CEO: Brynley Evans
- Headmaster: Daniel Biggins
- Gender: Co-educational
- Age: 11 to 18
- Enrolment: 1050
- Colour
- Publication: The Novaportan; The Eighth-hour
- Alumni: Old Novaportans ("ONs")
- Sponsor: The Haberdashers' Company
- School Houses: Owen , Darwin , Talbot Webb , Sa'adu
- Website: www.adamsgs.uk

Haberdashers' Adams Grammar School is a co-educational state grammar school for pupils aged 11–18 with boarding provision for boys, located in Newport, Shropshire. As of 2024, boarding fees are £14,553 per year for years 7-11 and £15,954 per year for Sixth Form. Haberdashers' Adams was founded in 1656 by William Adams, a wealthy member of the Worshipful Company of Haberdashers (one of the Great Twelve Livery Companies of the City of London). In July 2022, the school announced that it would become fully co-educational, starting from September 2024.

== History ==
Adams School, Newport Act 1660
- Act of Parliament
- Parliament of England
- Long title: An Act for the incorporating of the Master and Wardens of the Company of Haberdashers, London, to be Governors of the Free School and Almshouses at Newport.
- Citation: 12 Cha. 2. c. 12 Pr.
- Territorial extent: England and Wales

Dates
- Royal assent: 13 September 1660
- Commencement: 25 April 1660 (Note: Start of session.)

Status: Current legislation

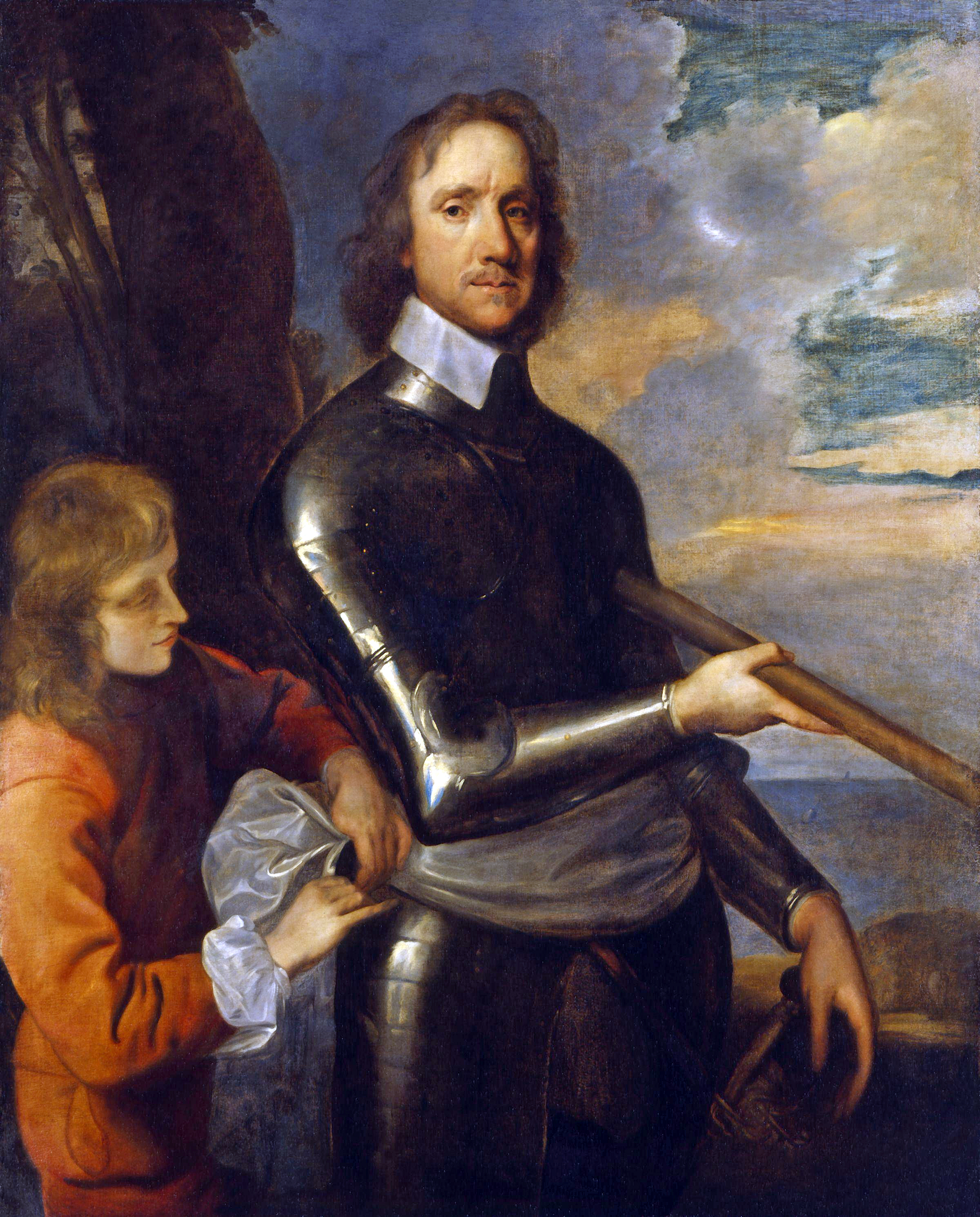
Oliver Cromwell, Lord Protector, granted permission to Alderman Adams for the school's foundation

Haberdashers' Adams was founded in 1656 by Alderman William Adams, a wealthy City of London merchant and haberdasher, who was born in Newport. Adams had no children and never married, so therefore decided to leave a bequest for the foundation of the school, which was first opened on 25 March 1656, during the politically unstable and volatile period of the English Interregnum. Having received permission from Oliver Cromwell to found the school, Adams sought to further ensure the school's continued existence by appointing the Master and Wardens of the Haberdashers' Company as governors in perpetuity. As one of the few schools founded during the Interregnum period, the school's articles of foundation were reconfirmed by a private act of Parliament the Adams School, Newport Act 1660 (12 Cha. 2. c. 12 Pr.), upon the Restoration of the Monarchy; a copy of which is held in the school archives.

Adams endowed the school with a large agricultural 900-acre (3.6 km^{2}) estate at Knighton in Staffordshire, providing income for future generations. The act establishing the school made the land exempt from land taxes (tithes and rates) until 1990. The school was endowed with 1,400 books soon after its foundation, which at the time represented one of the largest school libraries in England. Only seven of these books are still in the school's ownership, with the rest having been sold at various times when the school has suffered financial hardship.

The Knighton estate was eventually sold off in several portions over the course of the 20th century, and the proceeds of the final sale were used by the Haberdashers' Company to purchase Longford Hall as a boarding house for the school.

Haberdashers' Adams developed slowly, and did not expand beyond its original building, now known as Big School, until the turn of the last century, when Main School (also known as the S-Block) was built in the 1920s. Over the course of the next 90 years Adams' expanded rapidly, acquiring a number of buildings on Lower Bar in Newport for use as boarding houses; this in turn greatly expanded the school's town centre site. In the 1960s a new science block, connected to Main School was built, whilst a senior boarding master's house was created on land adjacent to Big School. During this period the school also built a new gymnasium, which was subsequently converted into a theatre in the mid-2000s. It has since been converted into a Sixth Form Common area following the construction of the new music block.

During the First World War, 362 Old Novaportans (former pupils) served in the Armed Forces, of whom 45 died and 77 survived with injuries. After the War a memorial fund was set up to assist the sons of the deceased, and an appeal raised £1,000. A tablet listing those who died was unveiled in the Main School building in 1921. In 1948, the Old Boys' Club erected another tablet alongside this to those who died in the Second World War. Both memorials are now displayed in the School Library.

In the modern era, the school's status has been expressed in a number of statutory arrangements. In 1950 the school became a voluntary aided school then after a brief spell as a grant-maintained school in the 1980s, Adams again faced the threat of closure or conversion to co-educational comprehensive status in the early 1990s; this was avoided by a successful campaign, organised by parents and governors, against the wishes of Shropshire County Council. In the late 1990s and 2000s Haberdashers' Adams again enjoyed voluntary-aided status; throughout its history the Haberdashers' Company has been key in supporting the school's vision and offering financial support for some of the more ambitious construction projects.

In the late 1950s, 2 girls from the local state school informally attended Science 6th form classes (qualification posted by male attendee at those same classes). In 1993, girls were admitted to the sixth form for the first time, bringing to an end Haberdashers' Adams' long tradition of educating boys only. The 1990s also saw the construction of the Wood and Taylor Centres for the study of design technology and maths. The Maths block has since been changed to an English block following the construction of the new Paddock block, reflecting the school's status in the later 1990s as a technology college. In the early 2000s, the school began to raise funds for the construction of a new state-of-the-art sports hall and fitness suite to replace dilapidated facilities. The Paddock Block was constructed in 2019 to contain Maths, Art and a new hall was built to accommodate the expansion of the school to include the new Sa'adu house.

In 2002, a history of the school by former headmaster David Taylor and his wife, Ruth, was published.

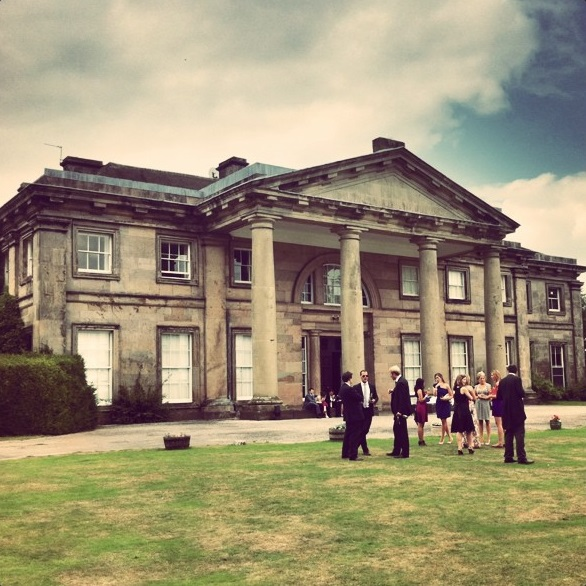
Longford Hall

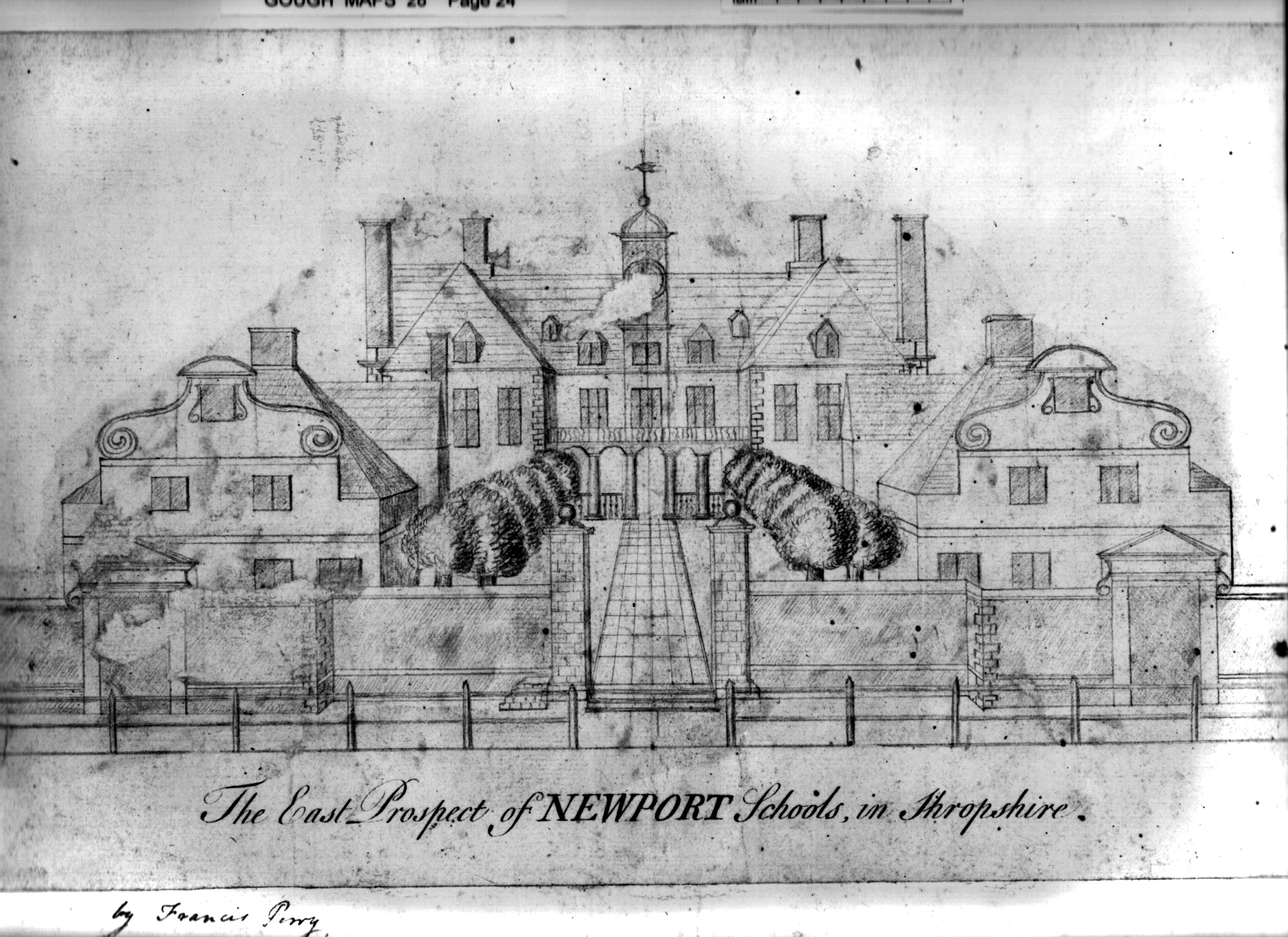
The oldest known sketch of Big School by Francis Perry (d.1765)

The late 2000s saw the school celebrate its 350th anniversary (in 2006), completion of a new science block and conversion of the former gymnasium into a performing arts centre (this, in turn, was converted into a Sixth Form Centre, which opened in 2013). The dilapidated music department was condemned for health and safety reasons in 2006; The Coach House, on Salters Lane, which backs onto the school grounds, was acquired by the Haberdashers' Company and converted into a new music department, which opened in 2013 alongside the new Sixth Form Centre.

In 2007, Haberdashers' Adams' Federation Trust (HAFT) was created in order to join Adams' Grammar School with the re-built Abraham Darby School (which later became Haberdashers' Abraham Darby Academy) in a loose federation. Under this trust, both schools would share the same board of governors. In September 2011, Adams' Grammar School was converted into an academy under the 2010 Academies Act and the federation was amended so that both schools would be combined under the ownership of HAFT. HAFT was later renamed as Haberdashers' West Midlands Academies Trust. In September 2023, the Haberdashers' West Midlands Academies Trust was joined by Castle House School, an independent preparatory day school in Newport, which subsequently became known as Haberdashers' Castle House.

In 2014, the school was publicly criticised by a former pupil who claimed that there was a culture of racism, sexism, and homophobia among students and staff and that "the fundamental doctrine that Adams' taught was that we should define ourselves by our perceived superiority to others". This was disputed strongly by the school's headmaster along with a number of former students.

In 2018, headmaster Gary Hickey changed the school's name from Adams' Grammar School to Haberdashers' Adams. This was reportedly done in order to reflect the school's "historic links" with the Worshipful Company of Haberdashers.

In 2023, a decision was announced that girls would be admitted into year 7 for the first time, and in September 2024, the first intake of year 7 girls started studying at the school.

== Admissions and performance ==
Haberdashers' Adams is a selective school which admits both boarding and day pupils.

=== Academic performance ===
In 2022, Haberdashers' Adams was downgraded to Good by Ofsted. Ofsted noted that the "effectiveness of leadership and management requires improvement" and that staff "are not receiving effective regular supervision". The school was not compliant with regard to a number of safeguarding principles, including failure to fulfil the basic safer recruitment of staff and volunteers. In relation to the boarding provision, Ofsted recognised in February 2026 that the school meets all the national minimum standards for boarding schools and meets the requirements for the grading: good. “Boarders told inspectors that they enjoy boarding and feel happy and safe”. The school has been scored as average with a Progress 8 score of −0.02 by the Department for Education.

== School life ==
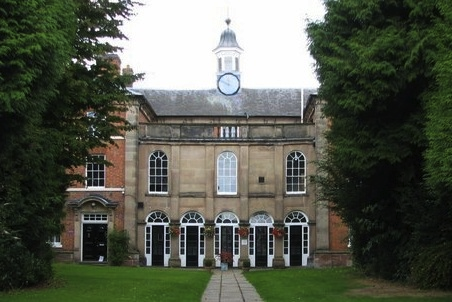
Big School and its front lawn as seen from the High Street, Newport

The headteacher is Daniel Biggins, who began in the role in September 2025. Before this, Gary Hickey was the headteacher for over a decade.

=== House system ===
Haberdashers' Adams has an extra-curricular house system which is the basis of inter-house sports competitions. Houses are named after Shropshire-born notables.

- Owen House, named after the poet Wilfred Owen, was called Clive House after Clive of India until 2021 when it was renamed after criticism of Clive.
- Darwin House, named after Charles Darwin.
- Talbot House, named after John Talbot, 1st Earl of Shrewsbury.
- Webb House, named after merchant naval officer and swimmer, Captain Matthew Webb.
- Sa'adu House, formed in the school year starting 2021, named after NHS worker and former pupil who died in the COVID-19 pandemic, Alfa Sa'adu.

House events include the House Music Competition; Dixon Cup, which covers drama and public speaking; Smedley Cup and House 7s, which are both rugby competitions; and other sports competitions such as House Cross Country and House Swimming. Intra-house geography, history, poetry and languages competitions also take place.

=== Boarding houses and student leadership ===
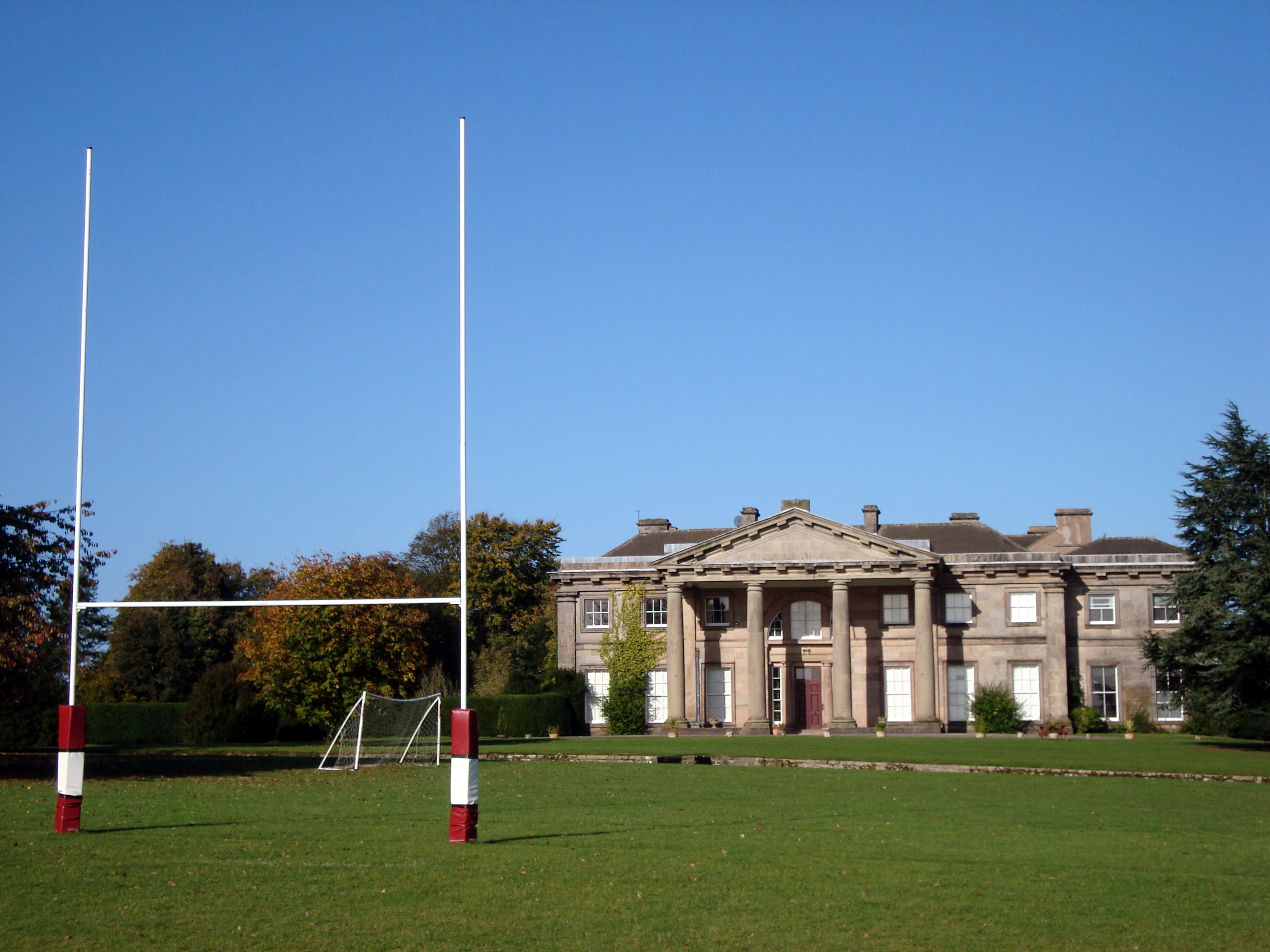
Adams' Longford Hall site viewed from the 1st XV rugby pitch

The school owns a number of dedicated boarding houses. The present junior hall (Longford Hall) is located by the school's playing fields about a mile away. In 2017 the Haberdashers' enabled the school to purchase and re-furbish Beaumaris Court, a former care home, to become the school's new senior boarding house, Beaumaris Hall. This new facility replaced the three senior boys' boarding houses which were situated in large Georgian townhouses facing the High Street.

Longford Hall was built in 1785 for Colonel Ralph Leeke, political agent to the British East India Company; the building was designed by Joseph Bonomi, who was an associate of Robert and James Adam.

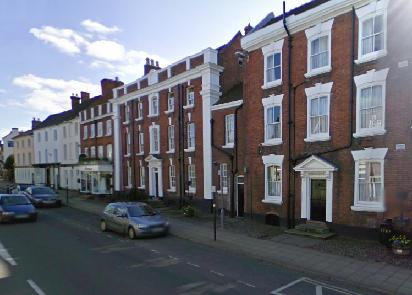
Adams' Georgian-era senior boarding houses near Big School on Lower Bar (in use until September 2017)

The hall is located on top of a low rise and overlooks farmland towards the Lilleshall Monument. As with many such buildings, the first 100 feet in front of the hall comprises manicured grass, bordered by a ha-ha to prevent animals from entering; today the ha-ha is best known amongst pupils for forming a part of the school's annual house cross-country course. There are a small series of formal gardens, including a "Quad". Behind the hall is a selection of buildings around a central square including a dovecote, once part of the estate's home farm.

Upon entry into the school in year 7, boarders are assigned to dormitories; upon moving to Beaumaris Court boys are assigned to double or, in some cases, single rooms, when these are available.

=== Combined Cadet Force ===
The Haberdashers' Adams CCF is available to year 8 students and above, as a result of which the school sends many officer candidate students to Sandhurst and Royal Air Force College Cranwell. The CCF also plays a role in Newport civic life, parading every year on Remembrance Sunday. The CCF recruits each new school year in September or October from year 8 and, demand permitting, the Lower Sixth. Cadets generally pass out in May or June of the same year.

The CCF has its own building where its stores are housed and NCO meetings take place. The CCF occasionally holds Overnight Exercises where battle drills and fieldcraft are practised; these are held either at Longford Hall, Nesscliffe Training Area, ROF Swynnerton or Leak Military Base. In previous years CCF prepared for the Annual House CCF Competition, known as The Thompstone Trophy, named after the eccentric former leader of the CCF Lt-Col Brian Thompstone; this entailed a Drill Competition, Shooting, Command Tasks, Memory Games, Forces-related Quizzes, Section Attacks, CQB and an OBS course. This has not run in recent years though. The CCF is inspected every two years (the Biennial Inspection) by a senior Army or RAF officer.

Both the Army and RAF sections of the CCF hold Summer Camps every year, visiting working military bases such as RAF Cranwell and Barry Buddon Training Area. Cadets can also attend Adventure Training Camps held annually at Llanbedr and Windermere, Easter Camps at RAF Akrotiri, Summer Camps at Ramstein Air Base and Leadership Courses at RAF Cranwell, Nesscliffe Training Area or at Frimley Park. Additionally, cadets also have the opportunity of attending special events such as the 65th D-Day Landing Commemorations and the Cadet 150 Celebrations.

The CCF has recently undergone many changes and improvements such as the incorporation of a new front team position of responsibility within the school of the Senior Cadet in 2023.

=== Sport ===
Haberdashers' Adams has traditionally been a rugby school, and as such requires all boys play rugby through years seven and eight during the autumn and spring terms. Upon entry into year nine, pupils are presented with the option of continuing to play rugby, or switching to field hockey. Cricket and athletics are the main sports disciplines undertaken during the shorter summer term. In year 11 and the sixth form, boys are presented with a wider range of sporting options. With a few exceptions, all sporting events and training takes place at the school's Longford Hall playing fields. Haberdashers' Adams operates a system of games afternoons, by which each individual year group is assigned a specific day of the week to attend afternoon physical activity sessions at Longford.

== Old Novaportans ==
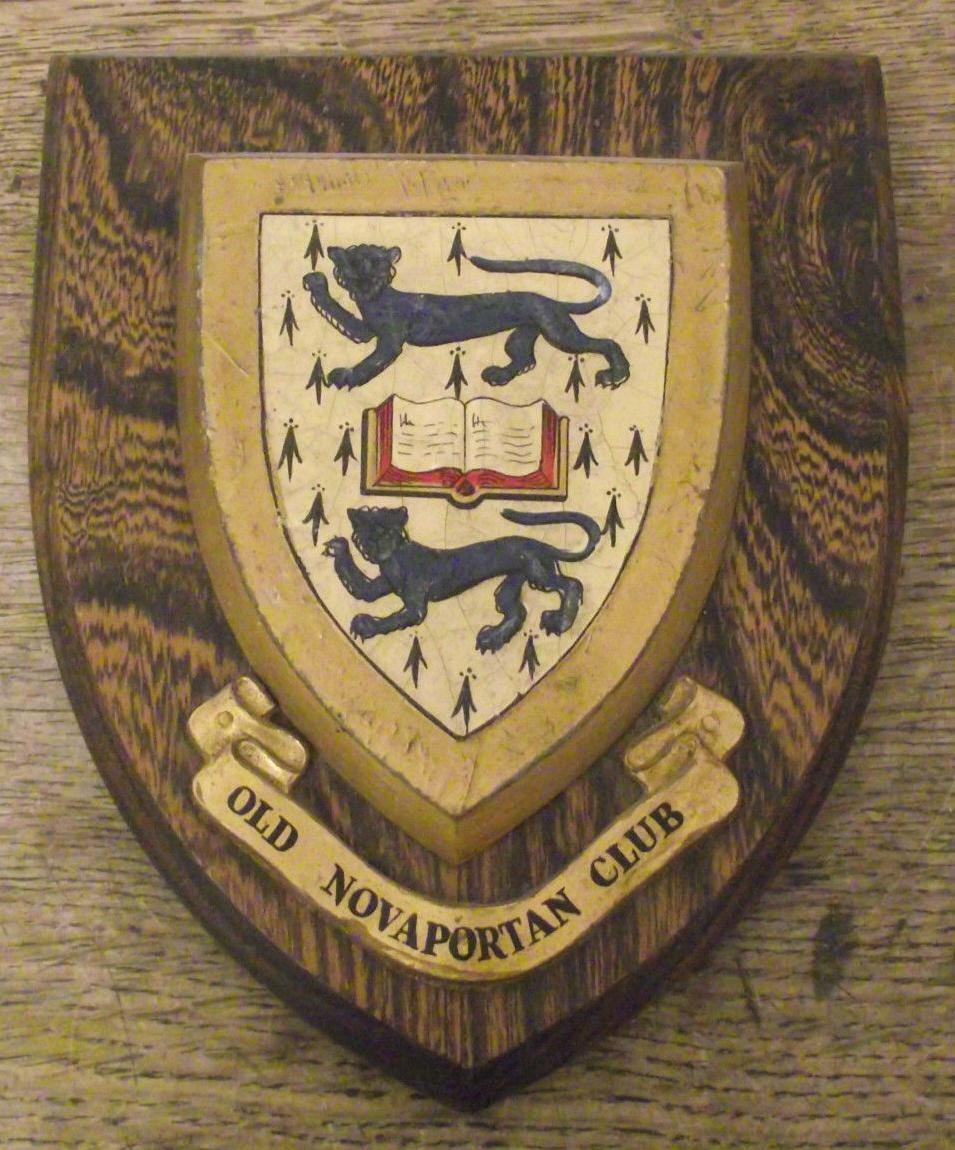
Coat of arms long-used by AGS and latterly adopted by the Old Novaportan Club (date unknown)

The School supports the Old Novaportans' Club which organises reunions, dinners and sporting events throughout the year to which its members are invited.

Former pupils are known as "Old Novaportans" (initialised as "ON").

=== Academia ===
- Piers Corbyn (born 1947) – weather forecaster, businessman, activist, anti-vaxxer and conspiracy theorist
- Donald Court (1912–1994) – James Spence Professor of Child Health at Newcastle University (1955–72) and former President of the British Paediatric Association
- William Cureton (1808–1864) – orientalist
- Dave Goulson (born 1965) – professor of biology (evolution, behaviour and environment) at the University of Sussex, expert on bumblebees and founder of the Bumblebee Conservation Trust
- Thomas Hollis (1720–1774) – benefactor of Harvard University, political propagandist, patron of Canaletto among other artists
- Helmut Koenigsberger (1918–2014) – professor of history, King's College, London, 1973–84, later emeritus.
- Sir Oliver Lodge (1851–1940)– inventor & first principal of Birmingham University
- James E. Quibell (1867–1935) – archaeologist and leading British Egyptologist
- Maurice Stacey (1907–94) – worked alongside Sir Norman Haworth to artificially synthesise vitamin C

=== Clergy ===
- Robert Charnock (1663–1696) – Dean of Magdalen College, Oxford, conspirator who planned to kill King William III
- Silvester Horne (1865–1914) – MP for Ipswich, Congregationalist Minister, and father of Kenneth Horne
- Gerald Lander (1861–1934) – Bishop of Victoria, Hong Kong
- Thomas Percy (1729–1811) – became Bishop of Dromore, wrote Reliques of Ancient English Poetry in 1765

=== Media and arts ===
- M. J. Bassett – film director and scriptwriter
- Simon Bates (born 1946) – radio disc jockey
- Barrington J. Bayley (1937–2008) – science fiction writer
- Tom Brown (1662–1704) – satirist
- Radzi Chinyanganya (born 1987) – presenter of Blue Peter from 2013 to 2019
- Jerskin Fendrix (born 1995) – musician and Academy Award nominee for best original score for the film Poor Things
- Ewen Henderson (1934–2000) – sculptor
- Eliot Higgins (born 1979) – investigative journalist, founder of Bellingcat
- Norman Jones (1932–2013)
- Shini Muthukrishnan (born 2002) – 43rd presenter of Blue Peter since 2024.

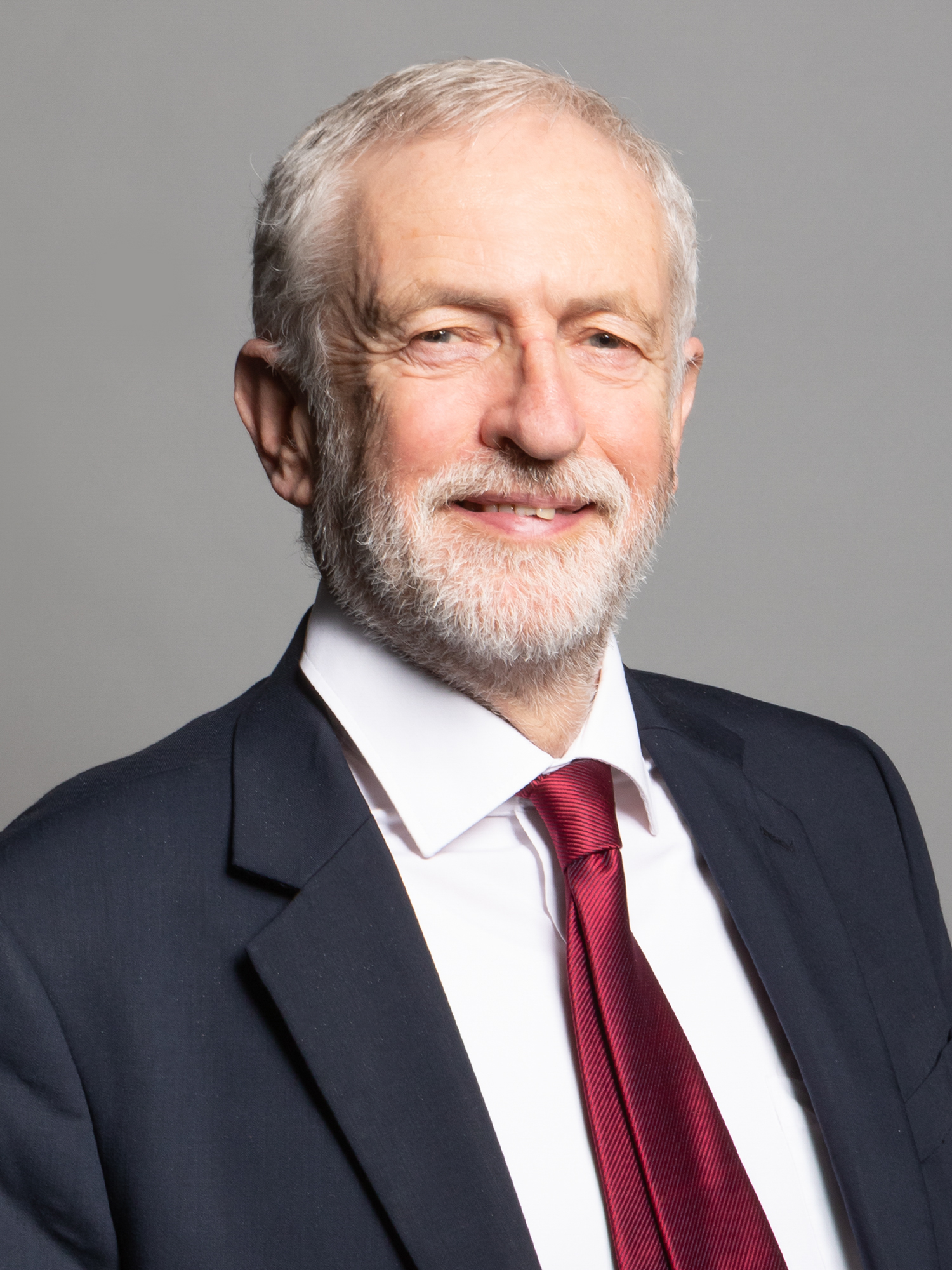
Official portrait of Jeremy Corbyn MP

=== Politics & business ===
- Peter Butler (born 1951) – former Conservative MP for North East Milton Keynes from 1992 to 1997, and current chief executive of Flying Scotsman plc
- Jeremy Corbyn (born 1949) – Your Party MP for Islington North since 1983, Leader of the Opposition and Leader of the Labour Party from 2015 to 2020, and Parliamentary Leader of Your Party since 2026.
- Nick Jenkins (born 1967) – chief executive of moonpig.com, former Glencore commodities trader.
- John Leveson-Gower, 1st Earl Gower (1694–1754) – Lord Privy Seal 1742–54, and first senior Tory member of government since George I of Great Britain's coronation in 1714
- Thomas Parker, Earl of Macclesfield (1666–1732) – Lord Chancellor and Acting Regent of Great Britain

=== Military ===
- Captain Thomas Ashburnham (1855–1924) – 6th Earl of Ashburnham
- General George Colt Langley (1810–96) – General, Royal Marines
- Matthew Smith (ca.1665-ca.1723) – 17th-century spy, intriguer and writer
- Sir Charles Buckworth-Herne-Soame Bt (1864–1931) 10th Baronet
- Major-General Francis Ventris (1857–1929) – General Officer Commanding British Forces in China

=== Sports ===
- Cedric Boyns (born 1954) – cricket player for Shropshire and Worcestershire County Cricket Clubs.
- Thalia Holmes (born 2004) – chess player and winner of Chess Masters: The Endgame in 2025
- Graham Kitchener (born 1989) – rugby player for Worcester Warriors and England
- Peter Ranells (born 1954) – cricket player for Shropshire.
- Dan Redfern (born 1990) – cricket player for Shropshire, Derbyshire and Leicestershire County Cricket Clubs
- Peter Short (born 1979) – rugby player for Bath Rugby and England Saxons

=== Former staff ===
- Tom Collins (1841-1934) - cricketer, later headmaster 1871-1903
- Donald Fear – history and government and politics teacher, the sixth person ever to win £1,000,000 on Who Wants To Be a Millionaire? in 2020
- Ryan Palmer (born 1974) – maths teacher and ex-Jamaican national chess champion
- Agnes Miller Parker (1895–1980) – former art teacher, engraver and illustrator
- Alec Peterson (1908–1988) – former headmaster, founder of the International Baccalaureate, and Director-General of Information Services during the Malayan Emergency between 1952 and 1954

== See also ==
- Longford Hall – junior boarding house and sports fields owned by the school, situated about one mile (1.6 km) away from the Main School site, in the village of Longford
- Grade II* listed buildings in Telford and Wrekin
- Listed buildings in Newport, Shropshire
