= Worshipful Company of Haberdashers =

Livery company of the City of London

Coordinates: 51.51801°N 0.10189°W

The Haberdashers' Company
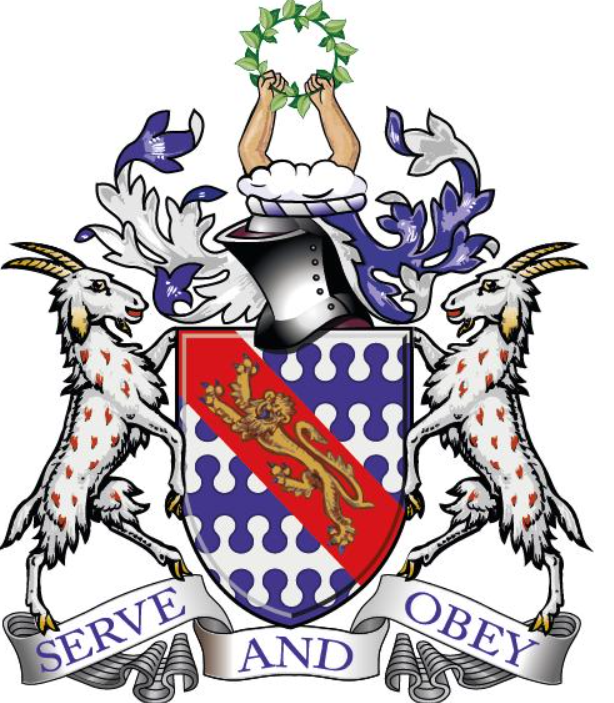
- Haberdashers' arms: Barry nebuly of six Argent and Azure on a Bend Gules a Lion passant guardant Or
- Motto: "Serve and Obey"
- Location: Haberdashers' Hall, London EC1
- Date of formation: 1448; 578 years ago
- Company association: Silk and velvet trade
- Order of precedence: 8th
- Master of company: Mrs Caroline Davis (Prime Warden)
- Website: haberdashers.co.uk

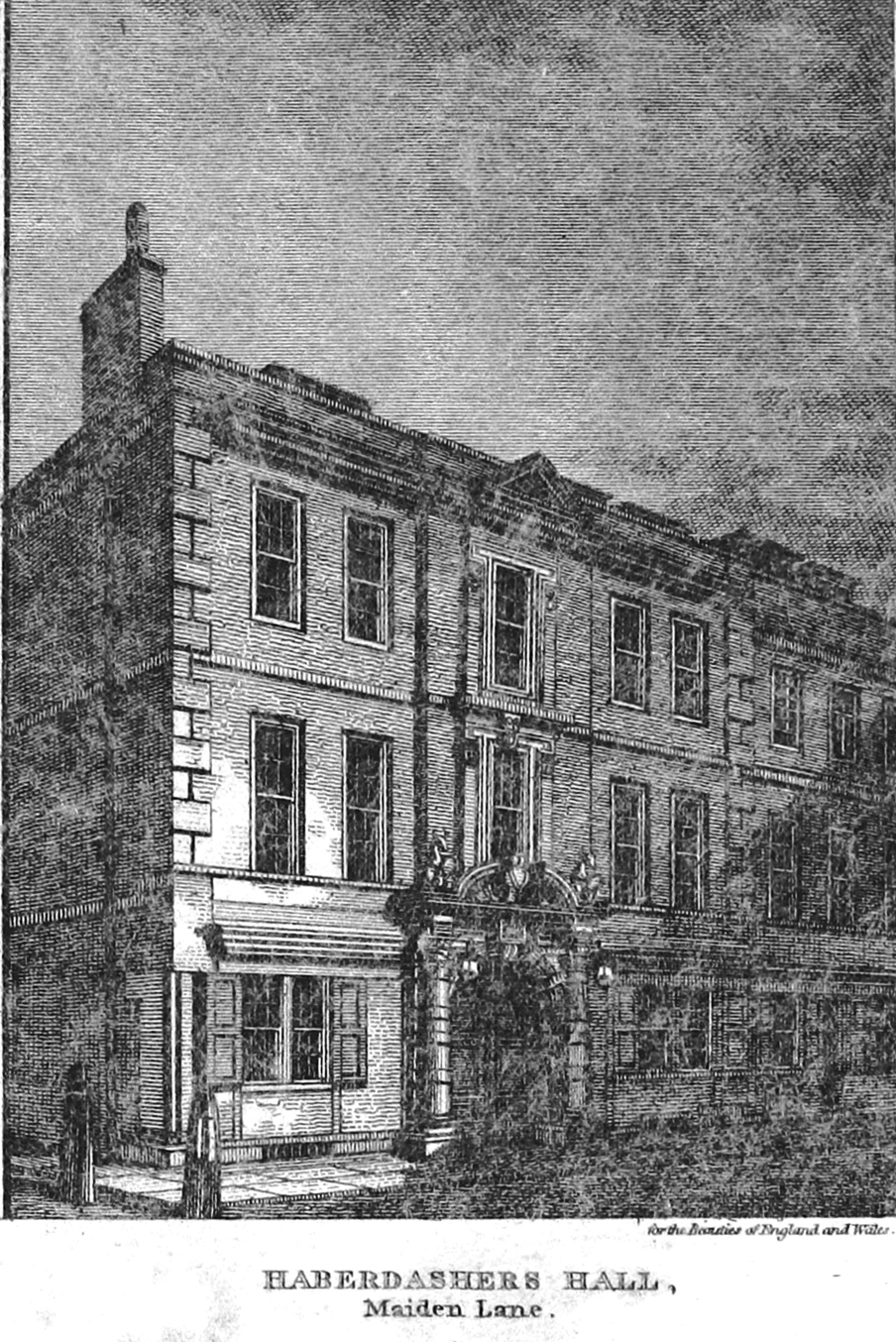
Haberdashers' Hall, Maiden Lane in 1820

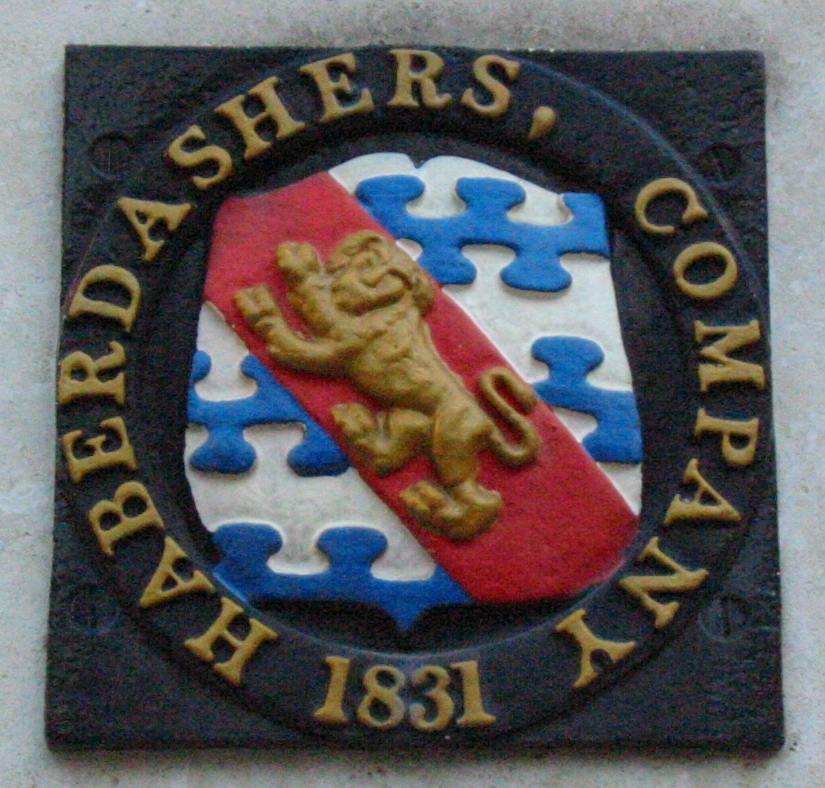
An 1831 heraldic property mark of the Haberdashers' Company

The Worshipful Company of Haberdashers, one of the Great Twelve City Livery Companies, is an ancient merchant guild of London associated with the silk and velvet trades.

== History and functions ==
The Haberdashers' Company received its first royal charter in 1448 and holds records from the Guild of St Katharine dating back to 1371. The formal name under which it is incorporated, since 2025, is The Five Wardens of the Fraternity of the Art or Mystery of Haberdashers in the City of London.

The Company was originally responsible for the regulation of silk and velvet merchants, then hatmakers, but began losing control over those trades as the population of London increased and spread outwards from the City after the Industrial Revolution. Through careful stewardship of financial bequests and funds, the Company now serves as a significant educational and charitable institution whilst maintaining links with its heritage by giving awards for fashion education.

As an educational foundation, the Haberdashers' Company maintains a strong tradition for supporting schools. It founded a boys' school at Hoxton, Middlesex, in 1690 and following redevelopment of the estate, in June 1875, the Haberdashers' Hoxton School reopened, divided into two for boys and girls. At the same time, the Company opened a boys' and girls' school at Hatcham in Surrey. The Haberdashers' Hoxton Boys' School moved to Hampstead, North London, then in 1961 to become the Haberdashers' Aske's School for Boys, Elstree. The Haberdashers' Girls' School, founded in Hoxton, moved to Creffield Road, Acton, opening on 1 November 1889 with 47 Hoxton pupils and 12 new girls, and reopening in September 1974 on its present site at Elstree as Haberdashers' Aske's School for Girls, adjacent to the Haberdashers' Boys' School. The Company's original Hatcham schools continue to be run as Haberdashers' Academies, open to girls and boys.

Elsewhere in England and Wales, Haberdashers' schools have been endowed notably by William Jones (Monmouth) and William Adams (Shropshire).

In 1990, at Monmouth School, the Glover Music School was established funded by Dame Jane Glover, sister of Past Master Richard Glover, and daughter of a previous headmaster.

The Haberdashers' Company continues, as required, to present copies of the King James Bible to pupils at all its schools, whilst welcoming those of all faiths and none. The Company owns and participates in the patronage of eight parish church advowsons.

The Company is sole trustee of two major educational charities: Haberdashers' Aske's Charity and the William Jones' Schools Foundation.

A Great Twelve Livery Company it ranks eighth in the City of London order of precedence. Like other livery companies, it supports the work of the Lord Mayor, the City Corporation and the Sheriffs: Sir William Russell, Master Haberdasher (2024/25), was the first Lord Mayor of London to serve consecutive terms (2019–21) since the 19th century; HRH the Duke of Edinburgh sits on its Court of Assistants as too does Alderman Robert Hughes-Penney, Sheriff of the City of London (for 2025/26).

Located near the Guildhall in Bassishaw Ward for six centuries, from 2002 the Company took additional premises in the City Ward of Farringdon Without, where Haberdashers' Hall is now headquartered.

The Haberdashers' motto is "Serve and Obey".

== Haberdashers' Hall ==
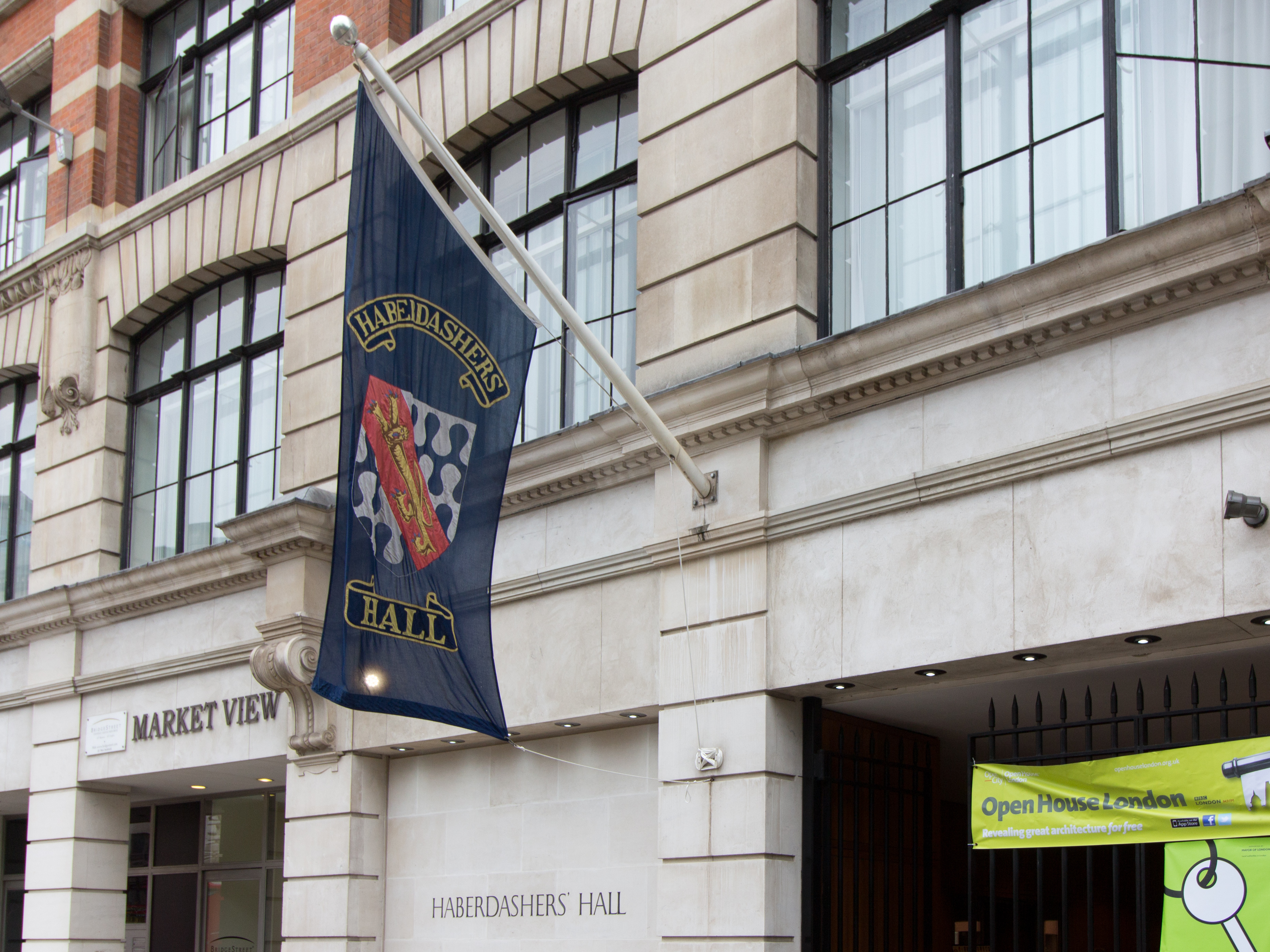
The Haberdashers' banner flying outside Haberdashers' Hall, London EC1

The Haberdashers' Company moved to its new hall at 18 West Smithfield on 15 April 2002, situated opposite the King Henry Gate of St. Bartholomew's Hospital.

On 24 October 2002 Queen Elizabeth II was welcomed by Master Haberdasher Nicholas Lund to formally declare the Hall open.

Haberdashers' Hall front gate on West Smithfield opens into a cloistered courtyard which to the right-hand side leads via a circular staircase upto the first floor where its Court Room, Committee Room and Luncheon Room adjoin the Reception Gallery. Through the Reception Gallery is the Haberdashers' livery hall, entirely oak-panelled with a high-vaulted ceiling.

There are also offices for Company staff, facilities for catering staff with storage and cellars below the Hall, together with accommodation for the Prime Warden and Beadle. On its south side, the Haberdashers' Company has developed office space opening onto Hosier Lane and on Market View, Smithfield, it maintains various meeting and function rooms as well as offices, residential apartments and retail units.

The Clerk to the Haberdashers' Company, since 2020, is Brigadier Angus Watson, and the Revd Marcus Walker serves as its Honorary Chaplain.

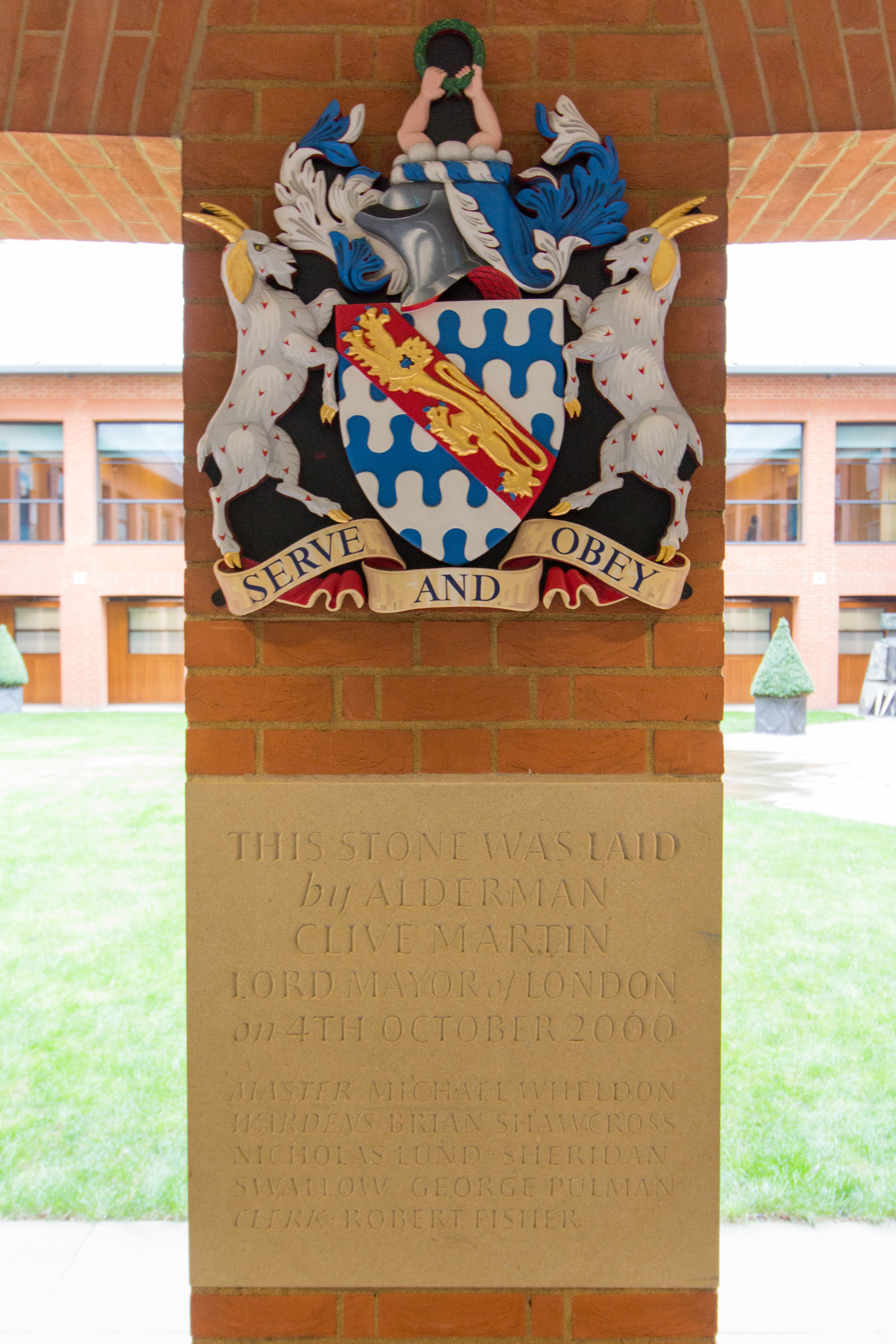
Haberdashers' Hall foundation stone

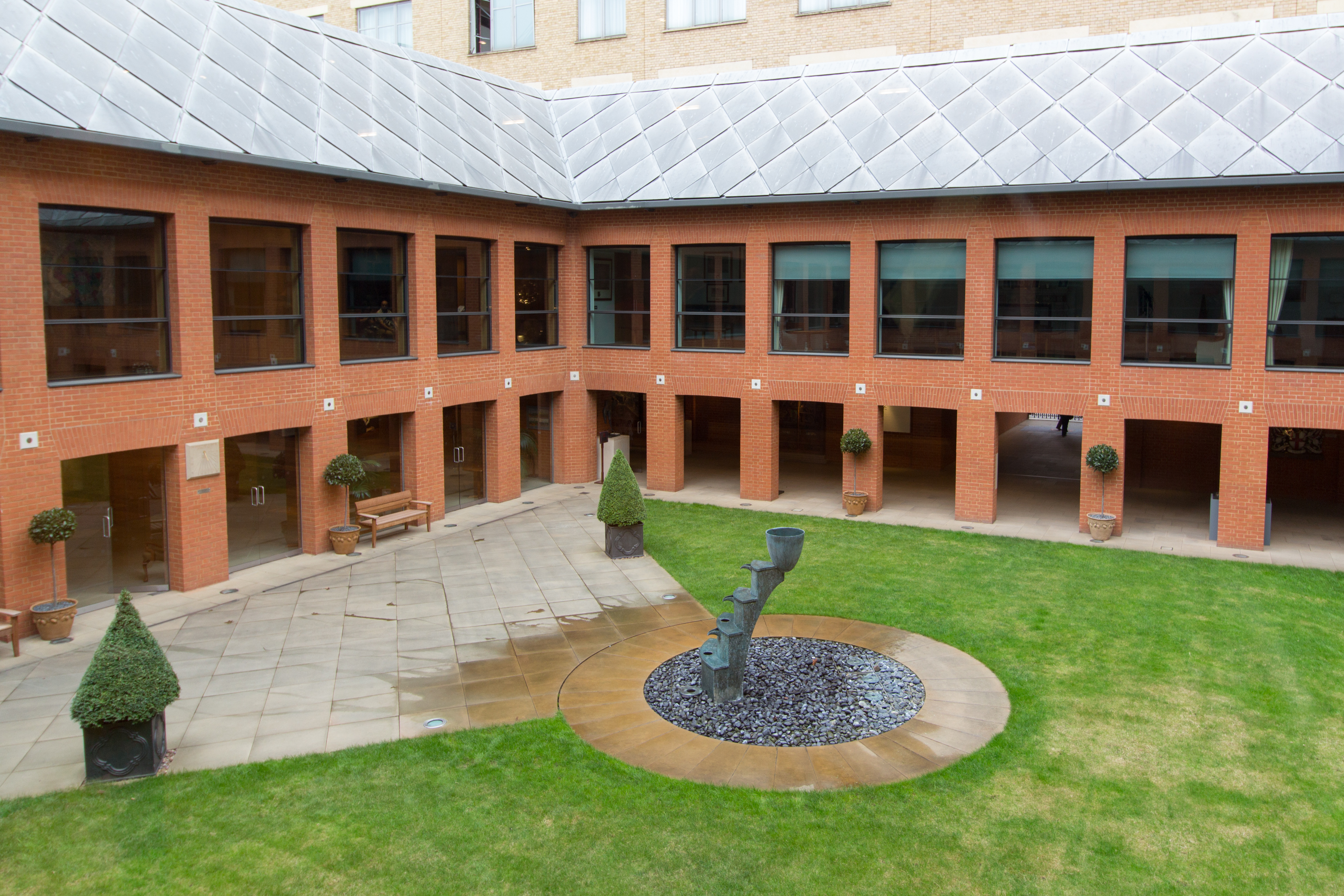
Haberdashers' Hall cloistered courtyard

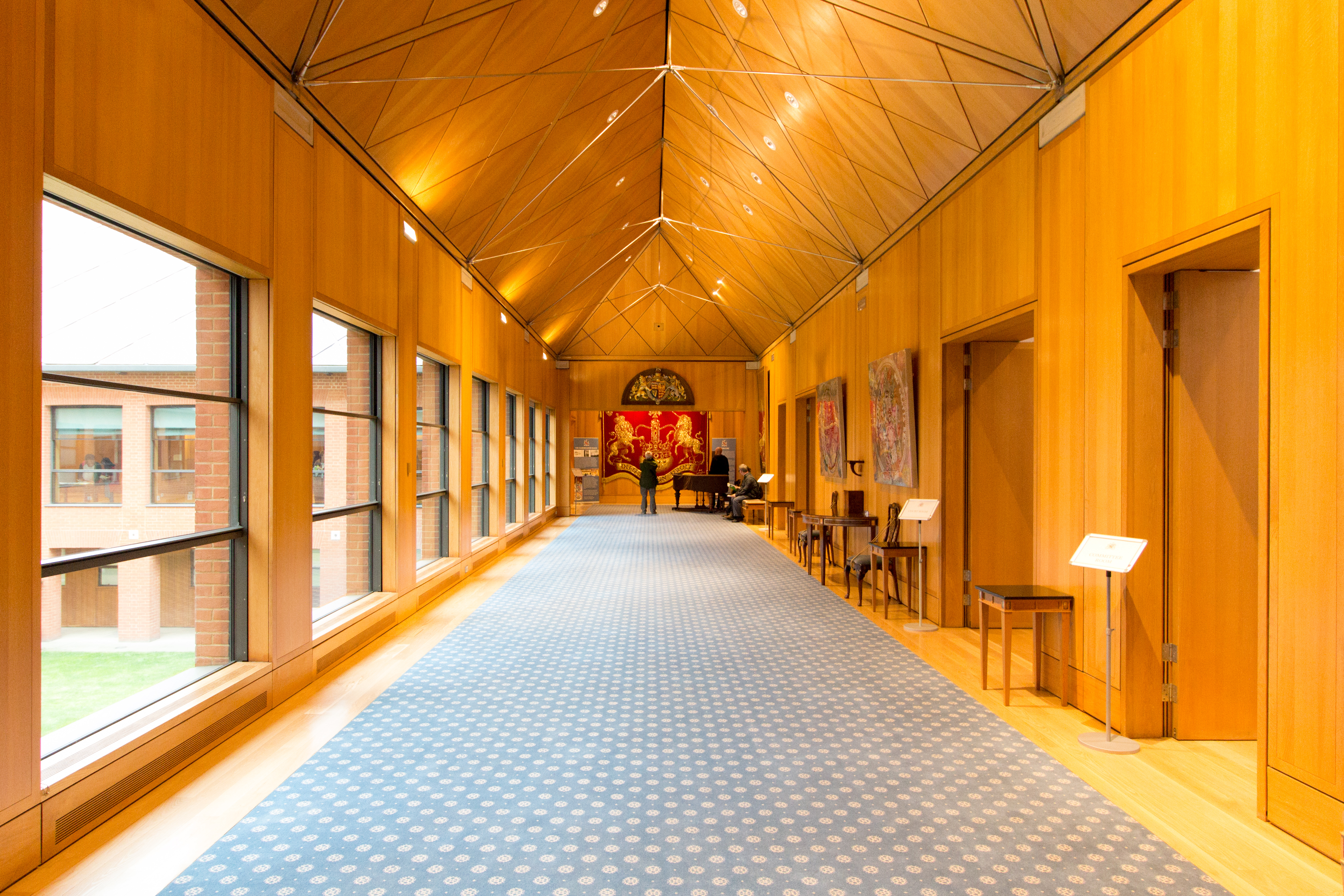
Reception gallery at Haberdashers' Hall

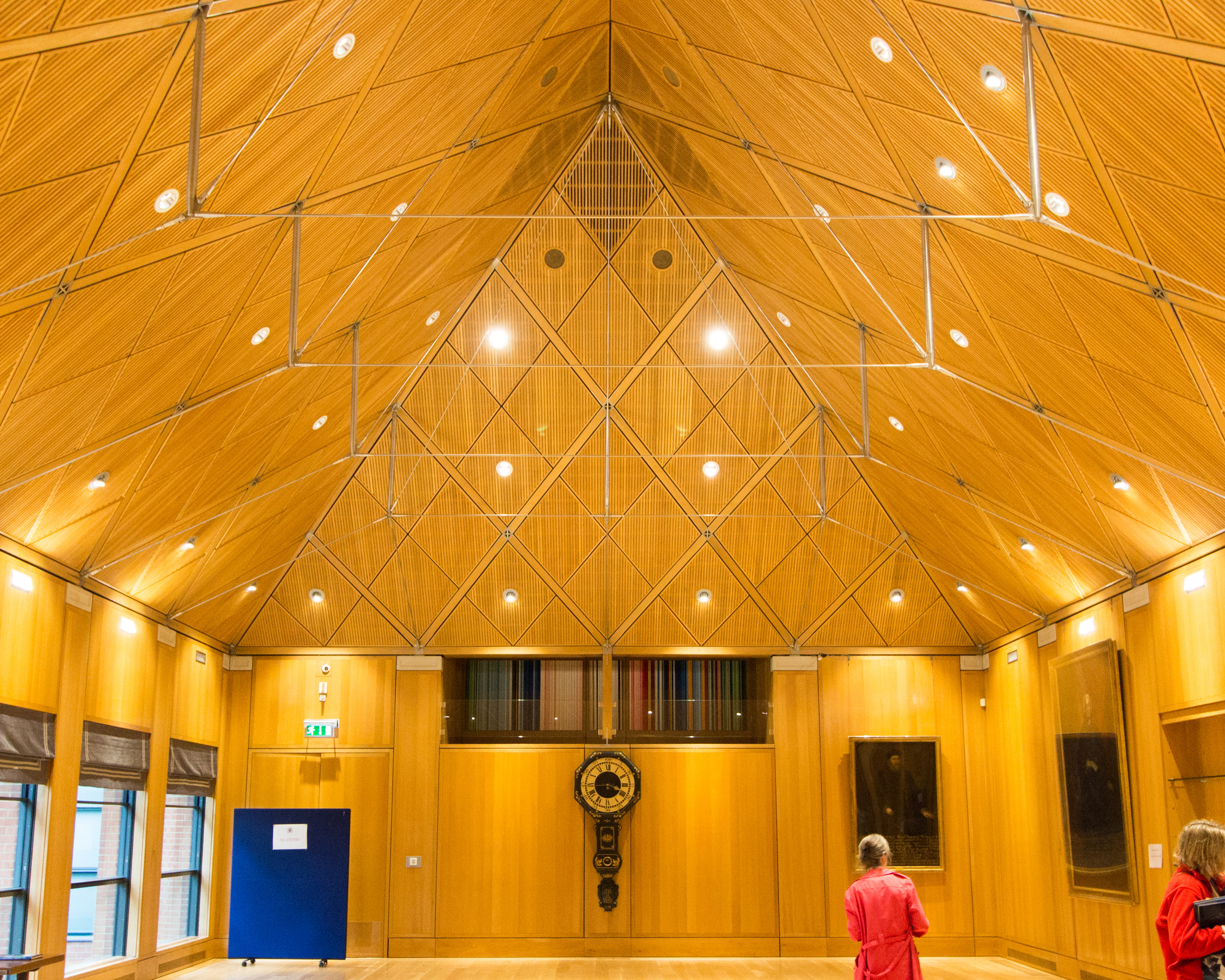
Haberdashers' livery hall minstrels' gallery

== Haberdashers' schools ==
- Haberdashers' Abraham Darby Academy, Telford, Shropshire
- Haberdashers' Adams (formerly Adams') Grammar School, Newport, Shropshire
- Haberdashers' Aldersey Church of England (aided) Primary School, Bunbury, Cheshire
- Haberdashers' Borough Academy, London SE1
- Haberdashers' Boys' School, Elstree, Hertfordshire
- Haberdashers' Girls' School, Elstree, Hertfordshire
- Haberdashers' Castle House School, Newport, Shropshire
- Haberdashers' Crayford Academy, Crayford, Kent
- Haberdashers' Crayford Primary School, Crayford, Kent
- Haberdashers' Hatcham College, London SE14
- Haberdashers' Hatcham Free School, London SE14
- Haberdashers' Hatcham Primary School, London SE14
- Haberdashers' Knights Academy, Downham, Kent
- Haberdashers' Knights Primary School, London Borough of Bromley
- Haberdashers' Monmouth School, Monmouthshire
- Haberdashers' Slade Green Primary School, Erith, Kent
- Haberdashers' West Monmouth School, Monmouthshire

== List of Lord Mayors and Master Haberdasher ==
- 1483–84: Sir Robert Billesdon
- 1532–33: Sir Stephen Peacock
- 1538–39: Sir William Fermor
- 1552–53: Sir George Barne
- 1555–56: Sir William Gerard
- 1579–80: Sir Nicholas Woodroffe
- 1582–83: Sir Thomas Blanke
- 1586–87: Sir George Barne
- 1587–88: Sir George Bond
- 1596–97: Sir Henry Billingsley
- 1600–01: Sir William Ryder
- 1601–02: Sir John Gerard
- 1604–05: Sir Thomas Lowe
- 1620–21: Sir Francis Jones
- 1627–28: Sir Hugh Hamersley
- 1631–32: Sir George Whitmore
- 1632–33: Sir Nicholas Rainton
- 1637–38: Sir Richard Fenn
- 1652–53: John Fowke, MP
- 1664–65: Sir John Lawrence
- 1688–89: Sir John Chapman
- 1699–00: Sir Richard Levett
- 1717–18: Sir William Lewen
- 1725–26: Sir Francis Forbes
- 1726–27: Sir John Eyles
- 1733–34: Sir William Billers
- 1738–39: Micajah Perry, MP
- 1794–95: Rt Hon. Thomas Skinner
- 1875–76: Sir William Cotton
- 1883–84: Sir Francis Wyatt Truscott
- 1891–92: Sir David Evans
- 1907–08: Sir John Bell
- 1915–16: Sir Charles Wakefield (later Viscount Wakefield)
- 1931–32: Sir Maurice Jenks
- 1956–57: Sir Cullum Welch
- 1967–68: Sir Gilbert Inglefield
- 1969–70: Sir Ian Frank Bowater
- 2019–21: Sir William Russell
Lord Mayor Russell's arms of office

Arms of Sir William Russell as Master Haberdasher

== See also ==
- Arte della Seta
- Haberdashery
- Smithfield, London
- Zunft
