= Graham Kitchener =

English rugby union player (born 1989)

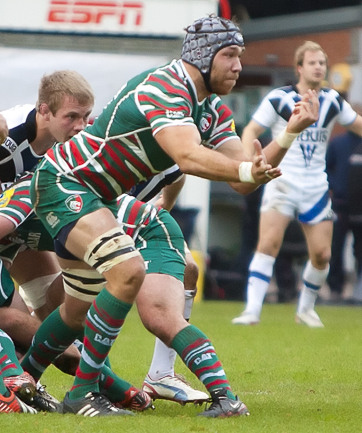
- Kitchener acts as an impromptu scrum-half for Leicester Tigers vs Bath, 1 December 2012
- Born: 29 September 1989 (age 37) Bromley, Greater London, England
- Height: 1.98 m (6 ft 6 in)
- Weight: 121 kg (19 st 1 lb; 267 lb)
- School: Adams' Grammar School
- University: Birmingham University
- Notable relative: Andrew Kitchener (brother)

Rugby union career
- Position: Lock
- Current team: Worcester Warriors
Senior career
Years	Team	Apps	(Points)
2008–2011	Worcester Warriors	61	(25)
2011–2019	Leicester Tigers	175	(65)
2019–2022	Worcester Warriors	46	(0)
2008–	Total	282	(90)
- Correct as of 19 May 2019
International career
Years	Team	Apps	(Points)
2008–2009	England Under-20		
2011	England Saxons		

Graham Kitchener (born 29 September 1989 in Bromley) is an English rugby union player. His position is lock.

== Career ==
He has represented England at Under 16, 18 and Under 20 level, and played a part in the Under 20s 6 nations grand slam in 2008. He was also a crucial member of the 2009 Under 20 squad, reaching the final of the JWC.

Kitchener attended Adams' Grammar School in Newport like fellow professional rugby player Peter Short of Bath Rugby.

A talented all round athlete, he spent 3 years playing football for Wolverhampton Wanderers Academy before deciding to focus on rugby. He was a schoolboy cricketer for Shropshire and was the Midlands Under 17 Shot Put champion, before finishing 6th in the English Schools championships. He combines his commitments as a professional rugby player with a full-time degree at University of Birmingham.

A graduate of the academy system at Aviva Premiership club Worcester Warriors, Graham Kitchener left the Warriors to join Leicester Tigers for the 2011–12 season. Kitchener started the 2013 Premiership final and scored a try as Leicester defeated Northampton Saints.

He played for the England Saxons through 2011, including their successful Churchill Cup campaign.

Kitchener was selected for the England squad to face the Barbarians in the summer of 2014.

He was called up to the senior England squad for the 2015 Six Nations Championship.

On 4 February 2019, Graham would re-sign for his old club Worcester Warriors, effectively leaving Leicester from the 2019–20 season.

On 5 October 2022, all Worcester players had their contacts terminated due to the liquidation of the company to which they were contracted.
