= Listed buildings in Newport, Shropshire =

Newport is a civil parish in the district of Telford and Wrekin, Shropshire, England. It contains 106 listed buildings that are recorded in the National Heritage List for England. Of these, four are at Grade II*, the middle of the three grades, and the others are at Grade II, the lowest grade. The parish contains the town of Newport and the surrounding area. Most of the listed buildings lie on the north–south axis of the main roads running through the town. A high proportion of the listed buildings are houses and associated structures, cottages, shops, public houses and hotels. Some of the older buildings are timber framed, and others have timber framed cores with later encasement or rebuilding. The other listed buildings include churches and associated structures, a memorial cross, bridges, schools, almshouses, a folly, and a war memorial.

== Key ==
Grade	Criteria
II*	Particularly important buildings of more than special interest
II	Buildings of national importance and special interest

== Buildings ==
Name and location	Photograph	Date	Notes	Grade
Butter Cross; 52.76933°N 2.37905°W		1280	The butter cross is in stone, and consists of a fluted headless shaft on a square plinth on a base of four octagonal steps. On the cross is an inscribed bronze plaque. The cross is also a Scheduled Monument.	II
St Nicholas' Church; 52.76965°N 2.37939°W		14th century	The oldest part of the church is the tower, the chancel was rebuilt in 1866 by Edward Haycock, jun., and the rest of the church was remodelled by John Norton between 1883 and 1904. It is built in red sandstone, and consists of a nave with a clerestory, north and south aisles, a south porch, a chancel with a south chapel, and a west tower. All the parapets are embattled. The tower has five stages, angle buttresses, and a higher stair turret to the southwest with a pyramidal roof.	II*
Old Guildhall; 52.76707°N 2.37775°W		c. 1400	The building, which was extended in the 16th century and again in the 19th century, is timber framed with brick infill, and has a tile roof. There are two storeys, and the building consists of a central range, a four-bay gabled cross-wing to the left, and a 19th-century gabled extension to the right. In the ground floor of the wings are shop fronts, and above are gabled oriel windows. The central range contains a canted bay window, a doorway and sash windows, and between the storeys is a carved bressumer. The left gable has 19th-century ornamental bargeboards.	II*
Front block and rear range, 75 High Street; 52.76914°N 2.37916°W	—	Early 16th century	A house, later a house and a shop, it was extended in the 17th century, and refaced in the 19th century. The front block is in red brick with a slate roof, three storeys and two bays. In the ground floor is a 19th-century shop front and a doorway to the right. The middle floor contains a canted bay window on the left; on the right in the top floor are sash windows. The rear range is timber framed with wattle and daub infill, partly clad in brick and with two storeys and a tile roof.	II
Smallwood Lodge; 52.76674°N 2.37764°W		c. 1600	A house that was altered and extended in the 19th century and later used for other purposes. It is timber framed with infill in brick and in plaster, the extension is in brick painted to resemble timber framing, and the roof is tiled with ornamental ridges. There is one storey and an attic, two gables on the front, and a single-storey recessed wing on the left. The central doorway has a rustic wooden porch, to its left is a square bay window, and to the right is a splayed bay window. The other windows are sashes, and in the extension is a round-headed window.	II
91 and 91A High Street; 52.76952°N 2.37985°W	—	Late 16th or early 17th century (probable)	A pair of shops that have a timber framed core, and have been refronted in red brick. There are two storeys and an attic, three bays, modern shop fronts, windows and gabled dormers. A short rear wing and part of the rear wall have exposed timber framing with red brick infill.	II
93 High Street; 52.76958°N 2.37994°W	—	Late 16th or early 17th century	A pair of shops that have a timber framed core, and a 19th-century stuccoed front. There are moulded boxed eaves and a slate roof. The building has three storeys and three bays. In the ground floor are modern shop fronts, and the upper floors contain sash windows, the middle bay in the top floor being blind.	II
4 Chetwynd End; 52.77206°N 2.38182°W	—	17th century	A timber framed house with brick infill, largely rebuilt or encased in brick in the late 19th century, with a tile roof. There are two storeys and two bays. In the centre is a doorway with a plain surround flanked by canted bay windows, all under a tiled pentice roof. In the upper floor are casement windows. The right gable end contains exposed timber framing, and has bargeboards and a spike finial.	II
87 and 89 High Street; 52.76943°N 2.37973°W	—	17th century	A pair of shops incorporating 16th-century timber framing, the building was refronted in the 18th century. The front is in red brick, with moulded plaster eaves and a tile roof. There are three storeys, four bays, and a two-storey rear wing. In the ground floor are modern shop fronts, and in the upper floors are sash windows with segmental heads and moulded keyblocks. The rear wing and part of the rear wall have exposed timber framing with red brick infill, and there is a blocked mullioned window.	II
34 St Mary's Street; 52.76993°N 2.37914°W	—	17th century	A shop with a timber framed core and a 19th-century stuccoed front that has a modillion cornice and a parapet. There are two storeys and three bays. The right two bays contain a late 19th-century shop front, and above are two sash windows. The left narrower bay is recessed and contains a doorway and a window, both round-headed.	II
Ivydene; 52.77065°N 2.38108°W		17th century	The house was refronted in the early 19th century. The front is in red brick on a plinth, above the middle floor is a corbelled cornice, at the top is a parapet, and the roof is tiled. There are three storeys and four bays. In the ground floor is a blocked round-headed arch flanked by canted bay windows, all under a cornice, and to the right is a doorway with pilasters and a cornice hood on consoles. The windows are sashes with keyblocks.	II
Central Block, Adams' Grammar School; 52.76939°N 2.38145°W		1656	The building was largely rebuilt and restored in 1821. It is in stone with a parapet containing a central balustrade, and a tile roof surmounted by a cupola with a clock. There are two storeys, and five bays divided by pilasters. In the ground floor is an arcade, originally a loggia, later containing semicircular-headed doors, and in the upper floor are three round-headed windows. Flanking the central block are wings in red brick with three storeys, three bays, sash windows, and doorways with pilasters and segmental pediments.	II*
105, 107, 111 and 116 High Street; 52.77007°N 2.38067°W		1657	A pair of identical buildings, at one time almshouses, that have been considerably restored. They are in red brick with stone corner pilasters and gables, and slate roofs. The buildings have two storeys and two bays each. The doorways have plain surrounds, the windows are casements, and in each gable is a stone tablet inscribed with details of the restoration.	II
130A High Street; 52.77058°N 2.38094°W	—	17th century	A stuccoed house with plain eaves and a tile roof. There are two storeys and an attic, and one bay. In the ground floor is a splayed bay window with a plain doorway to the right. In the upper floor is a splayed oriel window, and above is a gabled dormer.	II
Beaumaris House; 52.77040°N 2.38117°W		1724	A red brick house on a moulded stuccoed plinth, that has giant side pilasters with upper pedestals and moulded caps, a coved plaster cornice, and a panelled parapet. There are three storeys, five bays, and a two-storey, single-bay wing on the right. A perron leads up to the doorway that has a moulded surround with pilasters, a fanlight, and a pediment. The windows are sashes with shallow segmental heads, moulded keyblocks and aprons. The windows in the central bay also have moulded architraves, and in the parapet above is a dated and initialled tablet.	II
130 High Street; 52.77055°N 2.38089°W	—	Early 18th century	A house, later an office, with a stuccoed ground floor, painted brick and quoins in the upper storey, a tile roof, two storeys and an attic. The ground floor contains an office front, in the upper floor is a mullioned and transomed casement window, and above is a gabled dormer. Attached to the front is a 19th-century milestone with a cast iron plate inscribed with the distances in miles to London and to Chester.	II
New Bridge; 52.78421°N 2.37222°W	—	1726	The bridge carries a disused road over the River Meese. It is in sandstone and consists of two semicircular arches. The bridge has a plain stone band, and a plain parapet with plain stone coping.	II
5–9 High Street; 52.76729°N 2.37785°W	—	Mid 18th century	The building has a 17th-century core and was expanded in the 19th century. It is in red brick on a plinth, with stuccoed corbelled eaves and a tile roof. There are three storeys and an attic, and six bays. There are two recessed doorways and to their left is a window converted into a shop window. The other windows on the front are sashes with moulded segmental lintels and channelled keyblocks. On the north side is restored exposed timber framing, and on the left return is an oriel window.	II
11 and 13 High Street; 52.76741°N 2.37791°W	—	18th century	A pair of roughcast shops with a tile roof and two storeys. No. 11 has a splayed bay window with a pentice roof, the doorways are modern, and the windows are sashes.	II
49 High Street; 52.76849°N 2.37832°W		18th century	A narrow brick shop with a tile roof, three storeys and one bay. In the ground floor is a 19th-century splayed shop front with an elaborately moulded cornice and frieze. Above is a two-storey splayed bay window with a tile-hung gable.	II
63–67 High Street; 52.76893°N 2.37883°W	—	18th century	A row of shops, with probably a 17th-century core, partly roughcast and partly stuccoed, with plain eaves and a tile roof. They have two storeys and attics. In the ground floor are modern shop fronts and a recessed doorway. In the upper floor are casement windows, and above are two gabled dormers and two box dormers.	II
66 and 68 High Street; 52.76919°N 2.37880°W	—	Mid 18th century	A building in painted brick with quoins, a tile roof, three storeys, and four bays. In the ground floor is a modern bank front, and above are sash windows.	II
85 High Street; 52.76936°N 2.37962°W	—	18th century	A shop with a 19th-century stuccoed front, plain eaves and a tile roof. There are two storeys and an attic, and three bays. In the ground floor is a modern shop front, and above are sash windows, those in the middle floor with decorative moulded architraves.	II
121 High Street; 52.77029°N 2.38096°W	—	18th century	A stuccoed front was added to the building in the early 19th century, and it has moulded eaves and a tile roof. There are three storeys and three bays. The ground floor has been altered and has three openings, glazed above and blocked below. In the upper floors are sash windows in the outer bays and blocked windows in the middle bays.	II
123 High Street; 52.77032°N 2.38105°W	—	18th century	The house has a façade in red brick that was added in the early 19th century. It has a corbelled cornice and a parapet, three storeys, and four bays. The ground floor contains a modern shop front and doorway, and in the upper floors are sash windows with shallow segmental heads.	II
127 High Street; 52.77050°N 2.38133°W	—	Mid 18th century	A red brick house with moulded eaves and a tile roof. There are three storeys with cellars, and five bays. The doorway has a moulded surround and a pediment on consoles, and the windows are sashes with segmental lintels, channelled keyblocks, moulded sills, and brick aprons.	II
1 Lower Bar; 52.77059°N 2.38149°W	—	Mid 18th century	A stuccoed shop with coved plaster eaves and a tile roof. There are three storeys and five bays. In the ground floor is a modern shop front, and a passageway to the left with a semicircular head and a keyblock. The upper floors contain sash windows with moulded keyblocks.	II
Chetwynd House; 52.77208°N 2.38254°W	—	Mid 18th century	The house has been converted into flats, and is in red brick with quoins, moulded eaves. and a tile roof. There are two storeys and five bays. Steps lead up to a central doorway that has a stuccoed architrave and a stepped segmental pediment. The windows are sashes with shallow segmental heads, and moulded keyblocks and sills.	II*
London House; 52.76921°N 2.37937°W	—	Mid 18th century	A shop on a corner site with a 17th-century core, it is stuccoed, and has quoins, a moulded eaves cornice, stone-coped gables, and a tile roof. There are three storeys, and a front of four bays. In the ground floor is a 19th-century shop front with fluted granite pilasters, and in the upper floors are sash windows with plain lintels and moulded keyblocks.	II
1 Bridge Terrace; 52.77144°N 2.38209°W	—	Late 18th century	A red brick house with moulded stone eaves and a tile roof. It has two storeys and three bays. In the right bay is a doorway with a moulded surround and a pediment, and the windows are sashes.	II
4–8 Chetwynd Road; 52.77423°N 2.38067°W	—	Late 18th century	A row of three red brick houses with corbelled eaves and tile roofs. Nos. 4 and 6 have two storeys and two bays, and No. 8 has three storeys and one bay. The doorways have pilasters and hoods, and the windows are casements.	II
10 and 10A High Street; 52.76729°N 2.37736°W		Late 18th century	A red brick house with plaster eaves and a tile roof, three storeys and five bays. In the centre, semicircular steps lead up to a doorway that has Roman Doric columns, an open dentilled pediment, and a radial fanlight. This is flanked by splayed bay windows each with a dentilled cornice. In the upper floors are sash windows with plain keystones, those in the middle floor with segmental heads.	II
12 High Street; 52.76679°N 2.37720°W	—	Late 18th century	A red brick shop with corbelled eaves and a tile roof. There are three storeys and two bays. In the ground floor are splayed shop fronts with dentilled cornices, and the upper floors contain sash windows with plain keyblocks, shallow segmental heads, and moulded stone sills.	II
14 and 16 High Street; 52.76743°N 2.37747°W	—	Late 18th century	A red brick house with corbelled eaves and a tile roof. There are three storeys and four bays. There are two doorways with moulded surrounds and open pediments on consoles, and to the right is a smaller round-headed doorway. In the ground floor is a splayed bay window, and the other windows are sashes with moulded keyblocks.	II
18 High Street; 52.76753°N 2.37749°W	—	Late 18th century	A stuccoed shop with a tile roof, three storeys and two bays. In the ground floor is a late 19th-century shop front and a doorway to the right. In the middle floor are splayed oriel windows, and the top floor contains sash windows.	II
33 High Street; 52.76817°N 2.37809°W	—	Late 18th century	A shop in painted brick with plain eaves and a slate roof. There are three storeys and two bays. In the ground floor is a shop front, and in the upper floors are sash windows.	II
35, 35A, 37 and 39 High Street; 52.76824°N 2.37813°W	—	Late 18th century	A pair of stuccoed shops with plain eaves and a tile roof. There are three storeys and four bays. In the ground floor are modern shop fronts, and between them is a passageway with a four-centred arch. The middle floor has a splayed oriel window on the left, and two sash windows with cornices on consoles on the right, and in the top floor are sash windows with plain surrounds.	II
51 High Street; 52.76855°N 2.37839°W	—	Late 18th century	A red brick building with moulded eaves and a tile roof. There are three storeys and four bays. In the ground floor is a modern shop front, and to its left and in the upper floors are sash windows with shallow segmental lintels and keystones.	II
60 High Street; 52.76867°N 2.37795°W	—	Late 18th century	A stuccoed shop with an earlier core, possibly from the 16th century, with a band between the upper storeys, plain eaves, and a tile roof. There are three storeys and three bays. In the ground floor is a doorway with a moulded surround and an open pediment, and to the right is a moulded bay window. The windows are sashes, in front of the forecourt are 19th-century iron railings, and inside the building is a section of exposed timber framing with wattle and daub infill.	II
70 High Street; 52.76921°N 2.37882°W	—	Late 18th century	A red brick shop with a stuccoed frieze at the top, plain eaves on brackets, and a tile roof. There are three storeys and two bays. In the ground floor is a modern shop front, and above are sash windows with shallow segmental heads and plain lintels.	II
73 High Street; 52.76910°N 2.37909°W	—	Late 18th century	A shop in painted brick with plain eaves and a slate roof. There are three storeys and two bays. In the ground floor is a modern shop front, and in the upper floors are sash windows.	II
8 and 8A St Mary's Street; 52.76929°N 2.37840°W	—	Late 18th century	A stuccoed brick shop with a core probably from the 17th century, it has corbelled eaves and a tile roof. There are two storeys and an attic, and two bays. In the ground floor is a shop front with a bay window on the right, and to the left is an arched doorway. In the upper floor are sash windows with keyblocks, to the left is a blocked semicircular-headed window, and above are two gabled dormers.	II
14 St Mary's Street; 52.76948°N 2.37856°W	—	Late 18th century	A red brick shop with quoins and a tile roof. There are two storeys and an attic and three bays. In the ground floor is a late 19th-century shop front, in the upper floor are sash windows, and above are two gabled dormers.	II
38 St Mary's Street; 52.77002°N 2.37931°W	—	Late 18th century	A roughcast shop with moulded stuccoed eaves and a tile roof. There are three storeys and four bays. In the ground floor are modern shop fronts, and in the upper floors are sash windows with shallow segmental heads.	II
Castle House School; 52.77262°N 2.38023°W	—	Late 18th century	Originally houses, later converted into a school, it is in brick, stucco and stone, on a stone plinth, with corbelled eaves and tile roofs. It is partly in two storeys with an attic, and partly in three storeys, it has an irregular plan, and the windows are a mix of casements and sashes.	II
Old Hall; 52.76370°N 2.37550°W		Late 18th century	Originally a manor house, it is in painted brick with corbelled eaves and a hipped slate roof. There are three storeys and three bays. In the centre is a doorway with a porch, flanked by square bay windows, and in the upper floors are casement windows.	II
Former Star Public House; 52.76791°N 2.37755°W		Late 18th century	The former public house has a 17th-century timber framed core, it is stuccoed, and has a tile roof. There are three storeys and two bays, each containing a three-storey splayed bay window. To the left is a semicircular-headed doorway leading to a passage with exposed timber framing, and there is more timber framing inside the building.	II
9 Chetwynd End; 52.77270°N 2.38163°W	—	c. 1800	A stuccoed house with a moulded cornice between the storeys, a plain frieze and eaves, and a slate roof. There are two storeys and three bays. The central doorway has fluted pilasters, a plain entablature, and a modillion cornice. The windows are sashes, those in the ground floor with moulded architraves.	II
25–27 Chetwynd End; 52.77270°N 2.38114°W	—	c. 1800	A house, later divided unto three, probably with a 17th-century sore. It is stuccoed, with pilasters and a hipped slate roof. There are two storeys and five bays, the end bays projecting slightly. In the centre bay is a French window under a pentice roof and a wood lattice porch, and above it is a balcony with wood balustrading. The doorway has a plain surround and a radial fanlight, and the windows are sashes.	II
54 High Street; 52.76844°N 2.37777°W		c. 1800	A red brick shop, the ground floor painted, it has a band, stuccoed eaves, and a tile roof. There are three storeys and three bays. The ground floor contains a modern shop front. In the upper floors, the outer bays contain sash windows, and in the central bay is a stuccoed arch with a blind window above.	II
1 St Mary's Street; 52.76921°N 2.37859°W	—	c. 1800	A red brick shop with plain eaves and a tile roof. There are three storeys and one bay. In the ground floor is a recessed doorway with a pedimented hood, and to the right is a square shop bay window. Above are casement windows, the one in the middle floor with a segmental head.	II
3 St Mary's Street; 52.76926°N 2.37860°W	—	c. 1800	A red brick house with plain eaves and a tile roof, three storeys and three bays. Steps lead up to the central doorway that has a moulded wooden hood. To its right is a splayed bay window, and to the left is a small bow window. The windows above are sashes, in the middle floor with segmental heads, and in the middle bay they are blocked.	II
5 and 7 St Mary's Street; 52.76930°N 2.37867°W	—	c. 1800	A shop in painted brick with plain eaves and a tile roof. There are three storeys and two bays. In the ground floor curved steps lead up to a central doorway flanked by bow windows. In the upper floors are casement windows, those in the middle floor with shallow segmental heads.	II
101 High Street; 52.76986°N 2.38027°W	—	Late 18th or early 19th century	A red brick shop with a sill band, a stuccoed eaves cornice, and a tile roof. There are three storeys and three bays. In the ground floor is a modern shop front, and a round-headed passageway to the left. The middle floor contains sash windows with plain lintels, and in the top floor the outer bays contain casement windows, and the middle window is painted.	II
16, 18, 22 and 24 St Mary's Street; 52.76965°N 2.37872°W		Late 18th or early 19th century	A row of shops fronted in red brick, some rendered or roughcast, on an earlier timber framed core with two storeys and attics. In the ground floor are late 19th-century and modern shop fronts. Most of the windows in the upper floor are sashes and there are also splayed oriel windows, and above are gabled dormers. To the left is a carriageway containing exposed timber framing.	II
Audley Villa; 52.76656°N 2.37079°W		1817	Originally a grandstand, and converted into a house in about 1900. It is stuccoed, and has a plain frieze and a moulded cornice above the ground floor, a sill band, corner pilasters with moulded caps, projecting eaves, and a hipped slate roof. There are two storeys and five bays, the middle bay projecting slightly. The central doorway has pilasters, an entablature and a cornice, and the windows are sashes.	II
Railings and gates, Audley Villa; 52.76651°N 2.37083°W		1817	In front of the forecourt, and extending for about 20 feet (6.1 m) to the left, are cast iron railings with a geometrical pattern. They include two pairs of gates with a similar pattern on plain standards.	II
2 Bridge Terrace; 52.77155°N 2.38214°W	—	Early 19th century	A red brick house with flanking pilasters, plain eaves and a tile roof. There are two storeys and three bays, the middle bay slightly projecting. The central doorway has a stuccoed surround and a square-headed cornice hood on consoles, and the windows are sashes.	II
2A and 3–5 Bridge Terrace; 52.77167°N 2.38219°W	—	Early 19th century	A terrace of four painted brick houses with plain eaves and a tile roof. They have one storey and attics, and one bay each. All the houses have a doorway with a moulded surround, a canted bay window to the left, and a gabled dormer.	II
7 Chetwynd End; 52.77250°N 2.38182°W	—	Early 19th century	A red brick house with end pilasters, plain eaves and a slate roof. There are two storeys and three bays, the middle bay projecting slightly. The central doorway has a plain surround and a wood canopy on brackets, and the windows are sashes.	II
11, 15 and 17 Chetwynd End; 52.77290°N 2.38151°W		Early 19th century	A row of red brick houses on a stone plinth, with a sill band, a stuccoed frieze and eaves, and a hipped slate roof. There are three storeys and six bays, the third bay projecting slightly. The doorways are stuccoed with pilasters, rectangular fanlights and pediments, and the windows are sashes with plain lintels and keyblocks.	II
10 Chetwynd Road; 52.77470°N 2.38070°W	—	Early 19th century	A stuccoed house with a sill band, a plain frieze and eaves, and a slate roof. There are two storeys and three bays. The central doorway has a cornice hood on consoles, and the windows are sashes, those in the ground floor with moulded architraves.	II
25 High Street; 52.76795°N 2.37802°W	—	Early 19th century	The building has a 16th-century timber framed core. It is faced with painted brick and has a tile roof. There are two storeys and an attic, and three bays. In the ground floor is a canted bay window with a doorway to the right, and further to the right is a yard entrance. In the upper floor are sash windows, and above are two gabled dormers. There is exposed timber framing in a rear wing, and behind are extensive outbuildings.	II
41 and 43 High Street; 52.76833°N 2.37820°W	—	Early 19th century	The building is in red brick with stuccoed quoins, stuccoed modillion eaves, and a slate roof. There are three storeys and two bays. In the ground floor are modern shop fronts. The upper floors contain sash windows with stuccoed architraves, those in the middle floor with segmental pediments on consoles, and those in the top floor with sill brackets.	II
45 and 47 High Street; 52.76842°N 2.37827°W	—	Early 19th century	The building, at one time an inn, is stuccoed and has a parapet and a tile roof with a central pediment. There are three storeys and three bays, with pilasters between the bays and at the sides. The windows in the upper floors are sashes, those in the middle floor with multiple layers of consoles. In the ground floor is a modern shop front with an entry to the left, The doorway has pilasters, and above it is an entablature decorated with a shell, a scroll and a crown.	II
71 High Street; 52.76905°N 2.37901°W	—	Early 19th century	A red brick shop with plain eaves and a tile roof. There are three storeys and two bays. In the ground floor is a modern shop front with a round-headed passageway to the right, and above are sash windows and a small round-headed window to the right.	II
97 High Street; 52.76973°N 2.38014°W	—	Early 19th century	A stuccoed shop with moulded sill bands, a moulded eaves cornice, and a blocking course. There are three storeys and two bays. In the ground floor are modern shop fronts, and above are sash windows with moulded architraves. moulded sills, and those in the middle floor have keyblocks.	II
117 High Street; 52.77017°N 2.38073°W	—	Early 19th century	A stuccoed house on a plinth, with bands, moulded eaves, and a slate roof. There are three storeys and three bays. In the ground floor are five sash windows, and on the right is a doorway with a rectangular fanlight. The upper floors contain sash windows with moulded architrave surrounds.	II
Railings and gates, 131 High Street; 52.77044°N 2.38069°W	—	Early 19th century	Along the front of the garden are railings, and at each end is a pair of gates with openwork standards and ball finials, all in wrought iron.	II
2 Lower Bar; 52.77080°N 2.38134°W	—	Early 19th century	A stuccoed house with a parapet, two storeys and two bays. The central doorway has pilasters and a cornice hood on consoles. To its right is a shop window, to the left is a sash window with a cornice on consoles, and in the upper floor are two sash windows with plain architraves.	II
3 Lower Bar; 52.77066°N 2.38161°W	—	Early 19th century	A shop in painted brick with moulded plaster eaves and a tile roof. There are three storeys and three bays. In the ground floor is a modern shop front, and above are sash windows with stucco lintels and moulded keyblocks. The middle window in the top floor is blocked.	II
5 Lower Bar; 52.77073°N 2.38166°W	—	Early 19th century	A shop in painted brick with corbeled eaves and a tile roof. There are two storeys, three bays, and a rear wing in red brick. In the ground floor is a late 19th-century shop front that includes a bow window, and in the upper floor are sash windows.	II
6A St Mary's Street; 52.76918°N 2.37836°W	—	Early 19th century	A house with a brick front on an earlier timber framed core, with plain eaves and a slate roof. There are three storeys and one bay. In the ground floor is a projecting rectangular shop window with a cornice, and on the left is a doorway with a moulded surround. In each upper floor is a sash window.	II
1 Salter's Lane; 52.77064°N 2.38193°W	—	Early 19th century	A house in painted brick with corbelled eaves and a tile roof. It has two storeys, and three bays. The doorway has a plain surround, and the windows are casements.	II
9 and 11 Upper Bar; 52.76563°N 2.37682°W		Early 19th century	A pair of houses with a front partly stuccoed and partly roughcast on an earlier timber framed core, and with a tile roof. There are two storeys, the upper storey slightly overhanging. The building consists of a main range, a slightly projecting gabled wing on the right with a finial, and a rear wing. The upper storey of the gabled wing is flanked by pilasters on carved wood brackets. There are two doorways with moulded surrounds, the right doorway with a pedimented hood, and the windows are casements.	II
70 and 72 Upper Bar; 52.76678°N 2.37720°W	—	Early 19th century	A shop in painted brick with a tile roof, three storeys and three bays. In the ground floor are modern shop fronts, to the left is a round-headed passageway, and above are sash windows.	II
74 Upper Bar; 52.76685°N 2.37720°W	—	Early 19th century	A shop in painted brick with a tile roof, three storeys and two bays. In the ground floor is a modern shop window, and to the left is a doorway that has a moulded surround with pilasters, and a cornice hood on consoles. The windows are sashes, those in the middle floor with cornices on consoles.	II
Railings, gates and gatepiers, Adams' Grammar School; 52.77008°N 2.38042°W		Early 19th century	The entrance to the school grounds is flanked by a pair of stuccoed gate piers with panelled sides and cornices with scalloped cushion caps. Between the piers are wrought iron gates, and flanking them are railings and gates in front of 105 and 107 High Street.	II
Barclays Bank and 57 High Street; 52.76880°N 2.37870°W	—	Early 19th century	A bank and a shop, at one time a coaching inn, it is stuccoed, on a plinth, with plain eaves, a tile roof, and three storeys. The bank at the right has three bays, quoins, and a frieze and cornice above the ground floor. In the centre is the entrance flanked by Greek Doric pilasters and with a cornice hood. To the left are two windows, and to the right is a yard entrance. Above the entrance is a moulded segmental pediment on Ionic columns, with a garland in the tympanum and a window below. In the outer bays are sash windows in architraves. The shop to the left has two bays, a modern shop front and sash windows.	II
Barley Mow Hotel; 52.76874°N 2.37801°W		Early 19th century	The public house is in painted brick with a 17th-century timber framed core, and has a moulded cornice above the ground floor, corbelled eaves, and a tile roof. There are three storeys and four bays. In the ground floor is a 19th-century inn front, and above are sash windows with shallow segmental heads.	II
Bridge Inn; 52.77180°N 2.38223°W		Early 19th century	The public house is in painted brick with plain eaves and a tile roof. There are two storeys and an attic, and three bays. In the ground floor is a doorway with a moulded surround flanked by splayed bay windows, all under a cornice, and in the right bay is a passageway. The upper floor contains two sash windows, and an oriel window in the right bay, and above are three gabled dormers.	II
Chetwynd End House; 52.77284°N 2.38085°W	—	Early 19th century	A stuccoed house with giant pilasters, an entablature with a moulded eaves cornice, and a slate roof with pedimented gable ends. There are two storeys, three bays, and rear wings. The middle bay is narrower, it has a broken pediment, and contains a doorway with pilasters and an entablature. The windows are sashes, in the ground floor they have moulded architraves, and the central window in the middle floor also has a cornice on consoles.	II
Summer House Canal Bridge; 52.77504°N 2.37242°W		Early 19th century (probable)	The bridge carries a road over the Newport Canal. It is in stone, and consists of a single arch with a parapet.	II
Swan Inn Public House and 6 Lower Bar; 52.77089°N 2.38150°W		Early 19th century	The building is in painted brick with eaves that are partly corbelled and partly plain, and a slate roof. There are two storeys, the public house has four bays, and No. 6 has one. No. 6 has a bow window, and a doorway with pilasters and a fanlight. The public house has a doorway with pilasters, a canted bay window to the left, and a passageway in the right bay. The upper storey contains sash windows.	II
The Literary Institute; 52.76752°N 2.37795°W	—	Early 19th century	A red brick building with corbeled eaves and a slate roof. There are three storeys and three bays. Steps lead up to the central doorway that has pilasters and a rectangular fanlight. To its left is a rectangular shop bay window, and to the right is a tripartite sash window with a segmental head. The upper floors contain sash windows.	II
The Rectory; 52.77057°N 2.38057°W	—	Early 19th century	The house is in red brick with a sill band, stuccoed eaves, and a slate roof. There are two storeys and five bays. The central projecting porch has paired Ionic columns and a cornice, the doorway has a moulded surround and a segmental radial fanlight, and the windows are sashes.	II
26 and 28 Station Road; 52.76409°N 2.37520°W	—	c. 1830	A house later divided into two, it is in red brick with projecting wood eaves and a hipped slate roof. There are two storeys and three bays, the middle bay projecting. The doorway in the middle bay has Tuscan columns and a rectangular fanlight, and there are plain doorways with lattice porches in each return. The windows are sashes, those in the outer bays with moulded stone sills on corbels.	II
Royal Victoria Hotel; 52.77015°N 2.37978°W		1830	The hotel is in stuccoed stone with a rusticated ground floor and quoins, above which is a frieze and a cornice. At the top is a moulded eaves cornice, and the roof is tiled. There are three storeys and five bays that are separated by pilasters with decorative capitals, and above the middle three bays is a pediment. The central doorway has a Tuscan porch, and the windows are sashes. In front of the hotel are forecourt railings.	II
Congregational Church; 52.76580°N 2.37806°W		1832	Trinity Church, built as a Congregational church, is stuccoed, and has a front of three bays, over which is a pediment with acroteria. The bays are divided by giant pilasters with plain caps. In the centre the recessed portico has been enclosed by a glass screen.	II
St Peter and St Paul's Church and Presbytery; 52.76991°N 2.38353°W	—	1832	A west porch and baptistry were added to the Roman Catholic church in 1913. The church is in Early English style, and is built in red brick with sandstone dressings and a tile roof. It consists of a nave, a west porch and baptistry, and a sanctuary. Attached to the church is a presbytery with two storeys and an attic, and four bays. The presbytery incorporates material from the 17th-century Salter's Hall.	II
The Almshouses; 52.77177°N 2.37534°W	—	1836	The almshouses are in red brick with tile roofs, two storeys, and four bays. The outer bays project slightly, and have stone coping and apex crosses. The windows, which are casements, and the doorways have square-headed hood moulds.	II
1 Station Road; 52.76225°N 2.37329°W	—	c. 1838	Originally the stationmaster's house, it is in red brick with a sill band, pilasters between the bays, a stuccoed frieze, a moulded cornice, and a slate roof. It consists of two parallel ranges linked by a transverse wing, and has two storeys and three bays. The central doorway is flanked by plain columns, and has a rectangular fanlight, and the windows are sashes.	II
40 and 42 St Mary's Street; 52.77006°N 2.37943°W	—	c. 1840	A stuccoed shop with an enriched modillion cornice and a blocking course. There are three storeys, a main block of three bays, and a single-bay extension to the left with a plain parapet. In the ground floor is a modern shop front, and the windows are sashes.	II
4 and 6 Station Road; 52.76287°N 2.37335°W	—	c. 1840	A pair of stuccoed houses with projecting eaves on brackets, and roofs of tile and slate. They have two storeys and projecting gabled bays at the ends. In each outer bay is a splayed bay window, and the other windows are casements. Between the storeys is a balcony with an elaborate cast iron balustrade and lattice framing below. The doorways are on the sides, and each has pilasters, a semicircular fanlight, a keyblock, an entablature, and a cornice.	II
27–31 High Street; 52.76809°N 2.37806°W	—	1845	A row of shops in red brick with plain eaves and a slate roof. There are two storeys and four bays. In the ground floor are modern shop fronts, and in the upper floors No. 29 has a splayed oriel window, and the other windows are sashes. Between the windows in the top floor is an initialled datestone.	II
69 High Street; 52.76900°N 2.37896°W	—	Mid 19th century	A red brick shop with a parapet, three storeys and two bays. In the ground floor is a 19th-century shop front, and above are sash windows with plain lintels and keyblocks.	II
77 High Street; 52.76918°N 2.37927°W	—	Mid 19th century	A red brick shop with a band between the upper storeys, moulded stuccoed eaves, and a slate roof. There are three storeys and two bays. In the ground floor is a shop front, and above are sash windows in moulded stuccoed architraves, those in the top floor with segmental heads.	II
Folly, Castle House School; 52.77250°N 2.38015°W Check	—	Mid 19th century	The folly in the grounds of the school is in sandstone. It consists of a retaining wall and steps down incorporating five embattled turrets containing arrowslits, and with arched recesses at the lower end.	II
Pheasant Inn; 52.76667°N 2.37718°W		Mid 19th century	The public house is in red brick with corbelled eaves and a tile roof. There are three storeys and four bays. The doorway has a plain entablature and a cornice, and it is flanked by canted bay windows with slate roofs. The windows are sashes, and there is a blocked window in the top storey.	II
Former Town Hall; 52.76899°N 2.37817°W		1859–60	The former town hall, later divided into retail units, is stuccoed with stone dressings, and has a moulded eaves cornice, a parapet with balustrading, and a central clock with an elaborate surround. There are two storeys and six bays, the outer bays projecting slightly, with quoins and pediments. In the ground floor are modern shop fronts. The upper floor contains windows, in the middle four bays they have moulded architraves and round heads, and in the outer bays they have cornices and scroll cresting.	II
20 High Street; 52.76760°N 2.37754°W	—	Late 19th century	A shop in painted brick with corbelled eaves and a tile roof. There are three storeys and two bays. In the ground floor is a modern shop front, and above are sash windows with plain lintels.	II
81 and 83 High Street; 52.76933°N 2.37952°W	—	Late 19th century	A pair of shops on a corner site, with a 17th-century core, in applied timber framing with plaster infill, incorporating some 17th-century material, with sprocket eaves and a tile roof. There are two storeys and attics, the attics jettied on brackets. In the ground floor is a modern shop front, the upper floor contains two oriel windows, and on the corner is a polygonal turret.	II
Shakespeare Inn; 52.76654°N 2.37712°W		Late 19th century	The public house is stuccoed with plain eaves and a tile roof. There are two storeys, the upper storey overhanging in the centre, and four bays, the outer bays gabled. In the ground floor is a doorway and rows of sash windows divided by three-quarter pilasters. In the upper floor each gable contains an oriel window, and there is a central gilded bust of Shakespeare flanked by sash windows.	II
Gateway and walls, St Nicholas' Church; 52.77003°N 2.37999°W		c. 1905 (probable)	The churchyard is enclosed by sandstone walls. At the northern entrance is a gateway with buttresses, three arches, a stepped entablature and a pair of wrought iron gates. At the southwest side is a pair of stone octagonal piers with truncated pinnacle caps, and a pair of wrought iron gates.	II
Former Hogbens Garage; 52.77074°N 2.38127°W	—	c. 1910 (probable)	Originally an agricultural iron foundry and later used for other purposes, it is in red brick, painted at the front, with coved eaves, and a tile roof that has three small gables each containing a round window. There is one storey, and on the front are two horseshoe-shaped arches, the right glazed, and the left containing doors.	II
War memorial 52.76951°N 2.37930°W		1924	The war memorial is in the churchyard of St Nicholas' Church. It is in sandstone, and consists of a plain Latin cross on an octagonal pedestal. This stands on a two-stepped octagonal plinth and a two-stepped octagonal base. On the plinth are bronze plaques with inscriptions and the names of those lost in the two World Wars.	II
