= Nesscliffe =

Village in Shropshire, England

Coordinates: 52.770°N 2.918°W

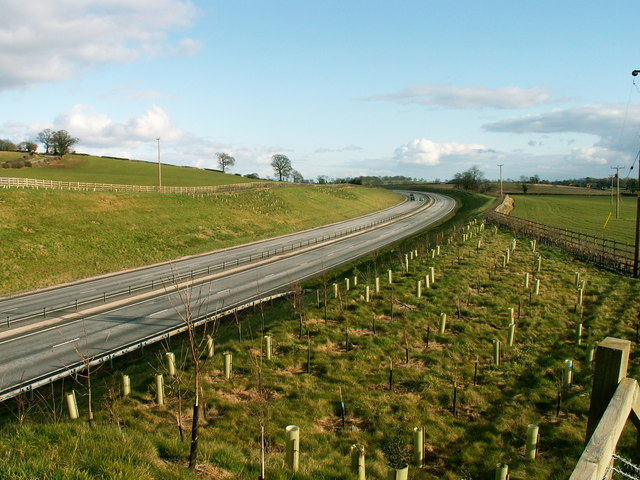
- The new A5 road Nesscliffe bypass awaits opening, 5 March 2003

- Location within Shropshire
- OS grid reference: SJ380195
- Civil parish: Great Ness
- Unitary authority: Shropshire
- Ceremonial county: Shropshire
- Region: West Midlands
- Country: England
- Sovereign state: United Kingdom
- Post town: SHREWSBURY
- Postcode district: SY4
- Dialling code: 01743
- Police: West Mercia
- Fire: Shropshire
- Ambulance: West Midlands
- UK Parliament: Shrewsbury

Nesscliffe is a village in Shropshire, England, located north of the River Severn. The village comes under the Great Ness parish.

The A5 road, which previously ran through the village, now runs around the village on a dual-carriageway by-pass.

== Local Government ==
Nesscliffe is represented on the Great Ness and Little Ness Parish council, which meet on the first Tuesday of every month, except for January and August, at Nesscliffe Village Hall or Little Ness Village Hall. It is also represented on the unitary Shropshire Council and in the Shrewsbury Parliamentary constituency.

== Amenities ==
The village has a primary school (St Andrew's C.of.E.) and post office. There is one working pub, The Old Three Pigeons; a former pub, the Nesscliffe Hotel, was ultimately a Chinese restaurant/takeaway called China Rose but it has been closed and near-derelict for a number of years.

The Nesscliffe Village Hall is used by the whole community for clubs, groups, meetings and events. There is a strong and dedicated committee who ensure that the Hall is well maintained, and who organise events throughout the year. Events and news are published on the community website and Facebook page.

== Local landmarks ==
The site of a cave used by the highwayman, Humphrey Kynaston now forms part of the Nesscliffe Hill Country Park. One mile south-west are the earthwork remains of Wilcott Castle, a small motte castle.

The Great Ness parish First World War war memorial, in form of a red sandstone cross, is located in Nesscliffe at the old A5 roadside. It lists nine men who died and 57 who served in that war.

=== Nesscliffe Hill Country Park ===
Nesscliffe Country park lies just off the A5 between Oswestry and Shrewsbury. The Old Three Pigeons Inn, dated back to the 15th century, is located south of the entrance to the Park and was said to be the watering hole of Humphrey Kynaston. Inside, a seat from Kynaston's cave is now part of the Inn's fireplace. The park itself is divided into three areas, from south to north: Nesscliffe Hill, Hopton Hill and The Cliffe (latter also accessible by footpath from Ruyton-XI-Towns). Shruggs Common, believed to be the smallest common in Shropshire of approximately 1/4 acre, is found on Nesscliffe Hill.

=== Nesscliffe Rock Cave ===
The Nesscliffe Rock Cave is part of Nesscliffe Country Park. It is a small sandstone cave and is better known as Kynaston's Cave, as it is the place Kynaston and his horse Beelzebub sought refuge. The entrance to the cave is six metres above ground level and stairs were cut into the soft rock, however over time the stairs have eroded. Inside the cave can be seen two chambers approximately four square metres big and the date 1564 carved into one of the walls, followed by the initials of H.K., reputedly of Humphrey Kynaston. A wooden staircase once existed to give access to the cave but was not extant as of 2015; today the steps have been fenced off and the mouth and window of the cave shut off by grids.

== CAD Nesscliffe ==
During the 1930s, there was a recognition of a need to provide secure storage for munitions within the United Kingdom. The proposal was to create three Central Ammunition Depots (CAD) in easily hewn and relatively horizontal rocks: one in the south (Monkton Farleigh); one in the north of England (Longtown, Cumbria); and one in the Midlands (Nesscliffe).

While Monkton Farleigh came into operations in 1939, CAD Nesscliffe was developed and run by the War Office, followed by the Ministry of Defence, after the start of World War II. To service the extensive property, the War Office took over the virtually defunct Shropshire and Montgomeryshire Railway from 1941, and built extensive additional service tracks along the 8.75 miles (14.08 km) of railway line from Maesbrook to the former Ford and Crossgate railway station, south of the River Severn.

Like a typical ammunition depot, the site was laid out over an extensive area to avoid total destruction should an accidental explosion occur, or the site be attacked by enemy. The site was made up of four sub-sites: Kinnerley, Pentre, Ford, and Argoed. The four sites were capable of storing around 50,000 tonnes (55,000 tons) of shells.

There was also a sub-site at Loton Park, under the Alberbury medieval deer park, used for storage of both incendiary ammunition and chemical weapons shells from 1943. This was one of two CW depots operated in co-operation with and guarded by the United States Army Air Forces, the second being in Shepton Mallet, Somerset.

Locomotives and train drivers were provided by the Royal Engineers, who also maintained the extensive network. Their main servicing depot for rolling stock was on the stub-junction of the former branchline to Criggion. Ammunition storage officially stopped in 1959 on site, and the ammunition depot closed in 1961, when the railway tracks were removed. Operational locomotives were moved to the Longmoor Military Railway, while the non-operational were sold-off commercially. Since 1961 the site has been part of the Nesscliffe Training Area.

== Bibliography ==
- Johnson, Peter (2008). The Shropshire & Montgomeryshire Light Railway. Hersham: Oxford Publishing Co. ISBN 978-0-86093-619-0.
- Brooks E. Kleber & Dale Birdsell (4 April 2003). The Chemical Warfare Service: Chemicals in Combat. University Press of the Pacific. ISBN 1-4102-0485-5.
