= Cedric Boyns =

English cricketer (born 1954)

Personal information
- Born: 14 August 1954 (age 72); Starbeck, Harrogate, Yorkshire
- Batting: Right-handed
- Bowling: Right-arm medium

Career statistics
Competition	First-class	List A
Matches	37	50
Runs scored	871	305
Batting average	18.53	9.83
100s/50s	0/4	0/0
Top score	95	41*
Balls bowled	3,105	1,866
Wickets	36	36
Bowling average	46.33	33.77
5 wickets in innings	0	0
10 wickets in match	0	0
Best bowling	4/34	3/24
Catches/stumpings	37/–	17/–
- Source: Cricinfo, 7 November 2022

Cedric Nigel Boyns (born 14 August 1954) is an English former cricketer who played at first-class level for a few years in the late 1970s.

He was born in Starbeck, Harrogate, Yorkshire and educated at Adams' Grammar School, Newport, Shropshire, Cambridge University, and the University of London.

Boyns started his career at Worcestershire in 1972, making a useful 47 opening for the Second XI against their Derbyshire equivalents on 31 July. He played two more Second XI matches that season, two in 1973, and then a considerable number in the second half of 1974. However, by the end of that year, in 25 innings his debut 47 remained his highest score. 1975 saw Boyns make two Second XI hundreds, on both occasions sharing large partnerships with fellow centurion Keith Wilkinson. Boyns also bowled for the first time in this season.

The following summer, he finally made his first-class debut against Somerset, albeit for Cambridge University rather than Worcestershire. He failed twice with the bat and bowled only four overs, and three further games for the university brought little change in his fortunes. Nevertheless, Worcestershire selected him to make his first-team debut on 23 June in the local derby against Warwickshire in the Benson & Hedges Cup. Despite his county's 12-run victory, it was a personal anticlimax: Boyns neither batted nor bowled. Three days later he did get to bat against Gloucestershire in the Gillette Cup, but was lbw to Procter for a duck. One day later still, he turned out against Surrey in the John Player League, but once more did not get a turn at the crease.

Boyns worked out some of his frustration with a hundred for the second team against Gloucestershire II, and at the start of July he was rewarded with a County Championship debut against Lancashire. Worcestershire won by an innings thanks to a superb all-round display by Imran Khan (111*; 7–53 and 6–46) so Boyns was only allowed a single innings, in which he scored 23. He also bowled seven wicketless overs for a cost of 17 runs. In a losing appearance in the B&H Cup final two weeks later he at least claimed his first senior wickets: Kent's Graham Johnson and Alan Ealham.

The latter part of the 1976 season saw Boyns at last establish himself in the Worcestershire first team, and he claimed his maiden first-class wicket (that of Surrey's Lonsdale Skinner) as well as scoring what would prove to be his highest score, a fighting 95 against Yorkshire which rescued his county from 76/4 in their first innings and eventually helped ensure a draw.

1977 started strangely for Boyns. He took 3–24 (his career best) against Oxford University, but this small bowling success was soon to be overtaken by a large batting crisis. Successive first-team innings of 16, 2, 4, 1, 1 and 2 saw Boyns drop to the seconds in the second week of May, but he immediately made an unbeaten 111 against Somerset II and was just as quickly recalled to the team proper. Once back, however, he struggled again, and this time it did not seem to matter whether he played in the first or the second team. In eight successive innings in all cricket he was dismissed for single-figure scores, and though his form had improved slightly by mid-August it was only in the final innings of the season, with Worcestershire following on against Somerset, that he made a significant score once more, with 77*.

In 1978 Boyns had plenty of first-team opportunities from late May to early July, but on the whole did not make the most of them. His highest score during this period was 41*, and though he claimed a List A career-best of 4–34 in the John Player League against Leicestershire he was soon back in the seconds yet again. Here, as they had on several previous occasions, the runs flowed, with scores of 105*, 87 and 78* leading to his recall. He made 71 against the New Zealanders in the second half of August, but little else was worthy of note. By 1979 Boyns' days as a Worcestershire cricketer were numbered, and indeed he made only one first-class appearance that summer, against the Sri Lankans in mid-July, although he did play six times in one-day matches. His last first-class wicket was that of Sri Lankan Roy Dias, while his last List A scalp was Sussex's Tony Pigott just a few days later.

Although Boyns never again played at first-class level, he did appear for Shropshire from 1973 up to 1985, both in the Minor Counties Championship and, on a single occasion in 1983, at List A level in the NatWest Trophy. Shropshire lost the game by 87 runs, unsurprisingly given that their opponents were the Somerset of Botham, Richards and Garner, while Boyns himself scored 12 and did not bowl. The following year he (and his former Worcestershire team-mate Wilkinson) appeared for the Old Hill side that won the William Younger Cup, while in 1986 Boyns had two minor outings for Marylebone Cricket Club (MCC) and while representing Shropshire played at club level for Newport as well as for Old Hill at Cradley Heath.

Boyns was a biology teacher at Royal Grammar School Worcester and a housemaster at Bloxham School.
