= Peter Short (rugby union) =

English rugby union player

- Born: Peter Short; 20 June 1979 (age 47) Liverpool, England
- Height: 1.96 m (6 ft 5 in)
- Weight: 123 kg (19 st 5 lb)
- School: Adams' Grammar School
- University: University of Wales Institute, Cardiff; Loughborough University

Rugby union career
- Position(s): Lock, Flanker
- Current team: Exeter Chiefs
Senior career
Years	Team	Apps	(Points)
1997–99	Moseley		
1999–03	Leicester	30	(19)
2003–05	RC Narbonne		
2005–11	Bath	100	(45)
2011–12	Exeter Chiefs		
International career
Years	Team	Apps	(Points)
2008	England Saxons	3	(1)

Peter Short (born 20 June 1979 in Liverpool, England) was a rugby union footballer who played as a lock forward predominantly for Bath in the Aviva Premiership.

He began playing rugby at Adams' Grammar School, in Shropshire, captaining the team from the no. 8 position. He went on to attend UWIC, before moving to Loughborough University.

Short began his professional career with Moseley, before moving to top English side Leicester Tigers. There, he mostly played in the back row at blindside flanker. He spent four years at Leicester Tigers as part of the squad that were Premiership Champions from 1999-02 and back to back Heineken Cup winners 2001 & 2002, making 49 first XV appearances, before he moved to RC Narbonne of France and then to Bath. Bath went on to win the European Challenge Cup in the 2007-08 season.

He has converted from no. 8 to flanker to lock,

He was called into the England Saxons squad to face Italy A in Ragusa, Sicily on 9 February 2008.

The signing of Short was confirmed by Exeter Chiefs official website on 14 June 2011. Unfortunately, Short was forced to retire from rugby in 2012 having failed to recover from a badly broken leg.

Short represented England Saxons at the 2009 Churchill Cup.

Short now coaches sport at Canford School in Dorset.
