= Francis Forbes (disambiguation) =

Francis Forbes (1784–1841) was a Chief Justice of the Supreme Court of Newfoundland and New South Wales.

Francis Forbes may also refer to:

- Francis Forbes, Lord Mayor of London, 1725
- Francis Blackwell Forbes (1839–1908), China merchant, opium trader and botanist
- Francis Gordon Forbes (1857–1941), Canadian lawyer, judge and political figure
- Francis Murray Forbes, founder of Cabot, Cabot & Forbes
