= Castle House School =

Independent school in Shropshire, England

Coordinates: 52.769°N 2.379°W

Haberdashers' Castle House
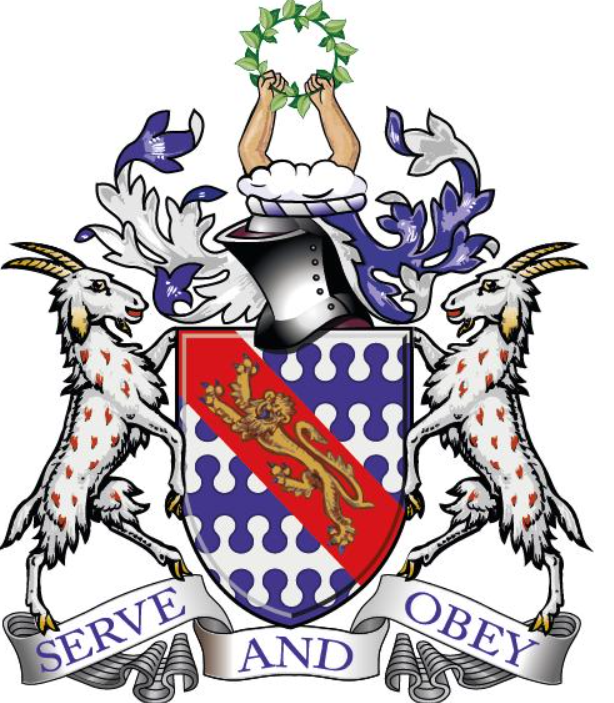
- Coat of arms of the Haberdashers' Company

Location
- Chetwynd End; Newport, Shropshire, TF10 7JE; England

Information
- Type: Private preparatory school
- Established: 1944
- Department for Education URN: 123611 Tables
- Chairman of Governors: James Penney
- Headmaster: Ian Sterling
- Chief Executive: Brynley Evans
- Gender: Co-educational
- Age: 2 to 11
- Enrolment: 122 (in 2014)
- School Trust: Haberdashers' West Midlands Academy Trust
- Former pupils: Old Castilians
- Parent Institution: Haberdashers' Adams
- Website: www.castlehouseschool.co.uk

Haberdashers' Castle House is a private preparatory day school for boys and girls, first established in 1944, at Chetwynd End, Newport, Shropshire.

Haberdashers' Castle House is an associate of the Worshipful Company of Haberdashers. It is also a member of the Haberdashers' West Midlands Academies Trust founded by nearby original Haberdasher school, Haberdashers' Adams.

== Architectural ==
At Haberdashers' Castle House, buildings were previously a group of houses consolidated into one mansion that was called "Merevale" before the school was founded, begun in the late 18th century with early 19th century and further modern extensions. In the grounds of the school is a mid-19th century brick folly consisting of a retaining wall with five embattled turrets and arrow slits.

== Character ==
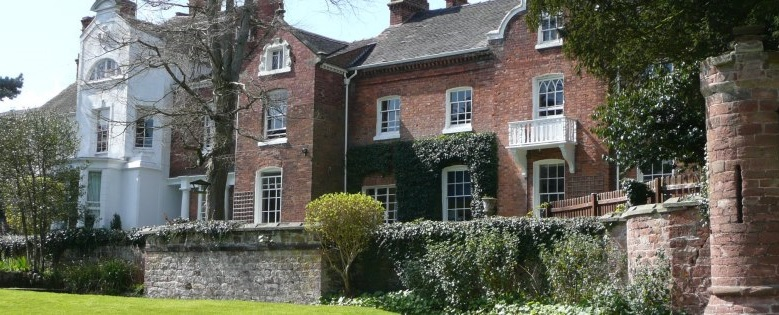
Haberdashers' Castle House

At Haberdashers' Castle House, the school is operated by the Haberdashers' Company under its own Castle House School Trust Ltd, a registered charitable organization, by up to twelve governors of the Trust. It occupies a Grade II listed main building with extensive grounds. Its "Cherubs Nursery" takes pre-school children aged from two to four. From here boys and girls, in roughly equal numbers, go into the Lower School, which comprises a Reception class and Years 1 and 2. The Upper School then caters for children until they leave, usually at the age of eleven.

At Haberdashers' Castle House, French is taught from the Nursery years on, and drama and dance begin in Reception. Sporting activities take place every day, and these include gymnastics.

A new headteacher, Ian Sterling, took over Haberdashers' Castle House in January 2018. The previous head, Richard Walden, was chairman in 2014 of the Independent Schools Association. Opening its annual conference in May 2014, he was critical of the state sector, claiming that "Schools are turning out too many amoral children because teachers cannot find the time to teach the difference between right and wrong." This was disputed by the government's Education Secretary, Michael Gove.

In 2023, Castle House became an associate of the Worshipful Company of Haberdashers' and a partner of Haberdashers' Adams Grammar School, under a joint agreement with Gary Hickey, headmaster of Haberdashers' Adams and the Haberdashers' Company.

== Notable Old Castilians ==
- Piers Corbyn (born 1947), conspiracy theorist
- Jeremy Corbyn (born 1949), politician, leader of the Labour Party from 2015 to 2020 (younger brother of Piers Corbyn).

== See also ==
- Listed buildings in Newport, Shropshire
