= Nesscliffe Training Area =

- Nesscliffe, Shropshire
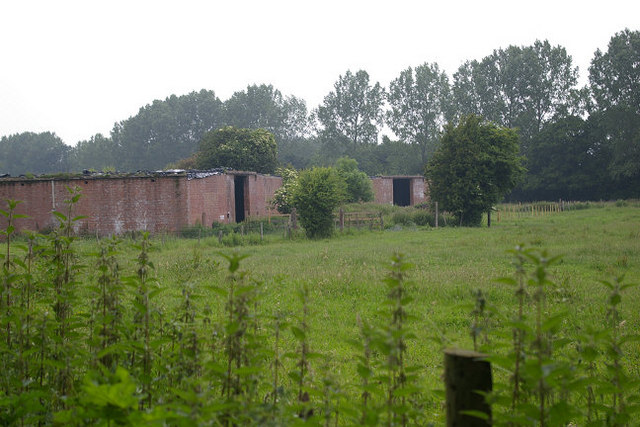
- Part of the Nesscliffe training area

Site information
- Type: Training area
- Owner: Ministry of Defence
- Operator: British Army

Location
- Location within Shropshire
- Coordinates: 52.76987°N 2.94283°W

Site history
- Built: 1961
- Built for: War Office
- In use: 1961-Present

Airfield information
Helipads
Number	Length and surface
1	23 metres (75 ft) Concrete
2	23 metres (75 ft) Concrete
3	23 metres (75 ft) Concrete
4	23 metres (75 ft) Concrete
5	23 metres (75 ft) Concrete

The Nesscliffe Training Area is a military training facility located near Nesscliffe in Shropshire.

== History ==
The training area is located on and around the former Central Ammunition Depot at Nesscliffe. The CAD was fed from the Shropshire and Montgomeryshire Railway which ran through the camp and the training area. The railway was taken over by the War Department in 1940.

Since 1961, the 1,681 acres (680 ha) of flat pastureland form the British Army's Nesscliffe training area (NTA), capable of accommodation up to 530 personnel. The bunkers once used to house ammunition are still used as of 2014 in training exercises. As well as Regular and Reserve troops, Nesscliffe is used extensively by local CCF and ACF units.

The NTA is also used constantly through the year by helicopters from the Defence Helicopter Flying School at RAF Shawbury for training pilots and crew.

Despite the name of the nearby village, officials at the Ministry of Defence spell the camp and training area Nesscliff.
