= Wedge (surname) =

Wedge is a surname. Notable people with the surname include:

- Albert Clark Wedge (1834-1911), American physician and politician
- Cathy Wedge (born 1950), Canadian equestrian
- Charles Wedge (1810–1895), Australian explorer
- Charles Wedge of Shudy Camps (1746–1842), English farmer and surveyor
- Chris Wedge (born 1957), American voice actor, producer and director
- Don Wedge (1929–2012), American football official
- Edward Davy Wedge (1777–1852), Australian settler
- Edwin Wedge (1911–1994), American speed skater
- Eric Wedge (born 1968), American baseball manager
- Frederick Wedge (1880–1953), American boxer
- George Wedge (1890–1964), American music writer
- Harry Wedge (1958–2012), Australian Aboriginal artist
- James Wedge (born 1939), British fashion designer and photographer
- John Wedge (1744–1816), English agriculturalist
- John Helder Wedge (1793–1872), Australian explorer and politician
- Roger Wedge (born 1948), Canadian politician
- Stuart Wedge (born 1985), English cricketer
- Thomas Wedge (rugby union) (1881–1964), British rugby union player
- Thomas Wedge of Chester (1760–1854), English agriculturalist
