= 1906–07 FA Cup =

Tournament details
- Country: England

Final positions
- Champions: The Wednesday (2nd title)
- Runners-up: Everton

The 1906–07 FA Cup was the 36th season of the world's oldest association football competition, the Football Association Challenge Cup (more usually known as the FA Cup). The Wednesday won the competition for the second time, beating holders Everton 2–1 in the final at Crystal Palace. This season's tournament is notable as the first in which more than 300 clubs (304) entered the competition, although six teams withdrew without playing a match.

Matches were scheduled to be played at the stadium of the team named first on the date specified for each round, which was always a Saturday. If scores were level after 90 minutes had been played, a replay would take place at the stadium of the second-named team later the same week. If the replayed match was drawn further replays would be held at neutral venues until a winner was determined. If scores were level after 90 minutes had been played in a replay, a 30-minute period of extra time would be played.

== Calendar ==
The format of the FA Cup for the season had a preliminary round, five qualifying rounds, and six proper rounds, including the semi-finals and final.

Round	Date
Preliminary round	22 September 1906
First round qualifying	6 October 1906
Second round qualifying	20 October 1906
Third round qualifying	3 November 1906
Fourth round qualifying	24 November 1906
Fifth round qualifying	8 December 1906
First round proper	12 January 1907
Second round proper	2 February 1907
Third round proper	23 February 1907
Fourth round proper	9 March 1907
Semi-finals	23 March 1907
Final	20 April 1907

== Qualifying rounds ==
Concern about the one-sided nature of the contests between Football League clubs and non-league qualifiers in the first round proper of the previous season's competition led the Football Association to re-introduce the fifth qualifying round for this tournament. This reduced the number of potential non-league challengers in the main draw from 24 to 12 and allowed the FA to exempt seven additional Football League clubs and four extra Southern League clubs to the first round. The practice of awarding a bye to the first round to the winner of the previous season's FA Amateur Cup was also introduced in this tournament.

The 12 clubs winning through to the main competition from the fifth qualifying round were Burton United, Burslem Port Vale and Glossop from the Football League, along with non-league sides Accrington Stanley, Crystal Palace, Watford, Irthlingborough Town, Kidderminster Harriers, Crewe Alexandra, Hastings & St Leonards United, Oldham Athletic and Northampton Town. Accrington Stanley, Irthlingborough Town, Hastings & St Leonards United and Oldham Athletic qualified for the first round proper for the first time.

== First round proper ==
36 of the 40 clubs from the First and Second divisions joined the 12 clubs who came through the qualifying rounds. Of the League sides not given byes to this round, Clapton Orient was entered in the preliminary round, but withdrew from the competition and their opponents, Grays United, were awarded a walkover. Burton United, Burslem Port Vale and Glossop were all entered in the fifth qualifying round.

Sixteen non-league sides were also given byes to the first round to bring the total number of teams up to 64. These were:

Southampton Millwall Queens Park Rangers Oxford City	Fulham Plymouth Argyle Reading Portsmouth	Luton Town Bristol Rovers Norwich City West Ham United	Brighton & Hove Albion New Brompton Brentford Tottenham Hotspur

Oxford City were the winners of the previous season's FA Amateur Cup, while the rest were all Southern League First Division clubs.

32 matches were scheduled to be played on 12 January 1907. Thirteen matches were drawn and went to replays in the following midweek fixture, of which four went to a second replay the following week.

Tie no	Home team	Score	Away team	Date
1	Bristol City	4–1	Leeds City	12 January 1907
2	Burnley	1–3	Aston Villa	12 January 1907
3	Liverpool	2–1	Birmingham	12 January 1907
4	Southampton	2–1	Watford	12 January 1907
5	Notts County	1–0	Preston North End	12 January 1907
6	Nottingham Forest	1–1	Barnsley	12 January 1907
Replay	Barnsley	2–1	Nottingham Forest	17 January 1907
7	Blackburn Rovers	2–2	Manchester City	12 January 1907
Replay	Manchester City	0–1	Blackburn Rovers	16 January 1907
8	Sheffield Wednesday	3–2	Wolverhampton Wanderers	12 January 1907
9	Bolton Wanderers	3–1	Brighton & Hove Albion	12 January 1907
10	Grimsby Town	1–1	Woolwich Arsenal	12 January 1907
Replay	Woolwich Arsenal	3–0	Grimsby Town	16 January 1907
11	Crewe Alexandra	1–1	Accrington Stanley	12 January 1907
Replay	Accrington Stanley	1–0	Crewe Alexandra	16 January 1907
12	Middlesbrough	4–2	Northampton Town	12 January 1907
13	West Bromwich Albion	1–1	Stoke	12 January 1907
Replay	Stoke	2–2	West Bromwich Albion	17 January 1907
Replay	West Bromwich Albion	2–0	Stoke	21 January 1907
14	Sunderland	4–1	Leicester Fosse	12 January 1907
15	Derby County	1–1	Chesterfield	12 January 1907
Replay	Chesterfield	1–1	Derby County	16 January 1907
Replay	Chesterfield	0–4	Derby County	21 January 1907
16	Lincoln City	2–2	Chelsea	12 January 1907
Replay	Chelsea	0–1	Lincoln City	16 January 1907
17	Burslem Port Vale	7–1	Irthlingborough Town	12 January 1907
18	Gainsborough Trinity	0–0	Luton Town	12 January 1907
Replay	Luton Town	2–1	Gainsborough Trinity	16 January 1907
19	Everton	1–0	Sheffield United	12 January 1907
20	Newcastle United	0–1	Crystal Palace	12 January 1907
21	Tottenham Hotspur	0–0	Hull City	12 January 1907
Replay	Hull City	0–0	Tottenham Hotspur	17 January 1907
Replay	Tottenham Hotspur	1–0	Hull City	21 January 1907
22	Oxford City	0–3	Bury	12 January 1907
23	Fulham	0–0	Stockport County	12 January 1907
Replay	Fulham	2–1	Stockport County	16 January 1907
24	Brentford	2–1	Glossop	12 January 1907
25	Bristol Rovers	0–0	Queens Park Rangers	12 January 1907
Replay	Queens Park Rangers	0–1	Bristol Rovers	14 January 1907
26	Portsmouth	2–2	Manchester United	12 January 1907
Replay	Manchester United	1–2	Portsmouth	16 January 1907
27	West Ham United	2–1	Blackpool	12 January 1907
28	Burton United	0–0	New Brompton	12 January 1907
Replay	New Brompton	0–0	Burton United	16 January 1907
Replay	New Brompton	2–0	Burton United	21 January 1907
29	Norwich City	3–1	Hastings & St Leonards United	12 January 1907
30	Bradford City	2–0	Reading	12 January 1907
31	Millwall	2–0	Plymouth Argyle	12 January 1907
32	Oldham Athletic	5–0	Kidderminster Harriers	12 January 1907

== Second round proper ==
The 16 second-round matches were played on 2 February 1907. Five matches were drawn, with the replays taking place in the following midweek fixture. One of these, the match between Blackburn Rovers and Tottenham Hotspur, went to a second replay the following week.

Tie no	Home team	Score	Away team	Date
1	Bury	1–0	New Brompton	2 February 1907
2	Southampton	1–1	Sheffield Wednesday	2 February 1907
Replay	Sheffield Wednesday	3–1	Southampton	7 February 1907
3	Blackburn Rovers	1–1	Tottenham Hotspur	2 February 1907
Replay	Tottenham Hotspur	1–1	Blackburn Rovers	7 February 1907
Replay	Tottenham Hotspur	2–1	Blackburn Rovers	11 February 1907
4	Bolton Wanderers	2–0	Aston Villa	2 February 1907
5	West Bromwich Albion	1–0	Norwich City	2 February 1907
6	Derby County	1–0	Lincoln City	2 February 1907
7	Burslem Port Vale	2–2	Notts County	2 February 1907
Replay	Notts County	5–0	Burslem Port Vale	6 February 1907
8	Luton Town	0–0	Sunderland	2 February 1907
Replay	Sunderland	1–0	Luton Town	6 February 1907
9	Woolwich Arsenal	2–1	Bristol City	2 February 1907
10	Fulham	0–0	Crystal Palace	2 February 1907
Replay	Crystal Palace	1–0	Fulham	6 February 1907
11	Barnsley	1–0	Portsmouth	2 February 1907
12	Brentford	1–0	Middlesbrough	2 February 1907
13	Bristol Rovers	3–0	Millwall	2 February 1907
14	West Ham United	1–2	Everton	2 February 1907
15	Bradford City	1–0	Accrington Stanley	2 February 1907
16	Oldham Athletic	0–1	Liverpool	2 February 1907

== Third round proper ==
The eight third-round matches were scheduled for 23 February 1907. There were three replays, played in the following midweek fixture.

Tie no	Home team	Score	Away team	Date
1	Liverpool	1–0	Bradford City	23 February 1907
2	Notts County	4–0	Tottenham Hotspur	23 February 1907
3	Sheffield Wednesday	0–0	Sunderland	23 February 1907
Replay	Sunderland	0–1	Sheffield Wednesday	27 February 1907
4	West Bromwich Albion	2–0	Derby County	23 February 1907
5	Everton	0–0	Bolton Wanderers	23 February 1907
Replay	Bolton Wanderers	0–3	Everton	27 February 1907
6	Woolwich Arsenal	1–0	Bristol Rovers	23 February 1907
7	Barnsley	1–0	Bury	23 February 1907
8	Crystal Palace	1–1	Brentford	23 February 1907
Replay	Brentford	0–1	Crystal Palace	27 February 1907

== Fourth round proper ==
The four fourth-round matches were scheduled for 9 March 1907. The Crystal Palace – Everton game was drawn, and replayed on 13 March.

Tie no	Home team	Score	Away team	Date
1	Sheffield Wednesday	1–0	Liverpool	9 March 1907
2	West Bromwich Albion	3–1	Notts County	9 March 1907
3	Barnsley	1–2	Woolwich Arsenal	9 March 1907
4	Crystal Palace	1–1	Everton	9 March 1907
Replay	Everton	4–0	Crystal Palace	13 March 1907

== Semi-finals ==
The semi-final matches were played on 23 March 1907. The Wednesday and Everton won to meet in the final.

23 March 1907
15:00

The Wednesday	3–1	Woolwich Arsenal

St Andrew's, Birmingham

23 March 1907
15:00

Everton	2–1	West Bromwich Albion

Burnden Park, Bolton

== Final ==
The Final was contested by The Wednesday and Everton at Crystal Palace. Sheffield Wednesday won 2–1, with goals by Jimmy Stewart and George Simpson.

20 April 1907
15:00 GMT

The Wednesday	2–1	Everton
Stewart 20'; Simpson 86'		Sharp 45'

Crystal Palace, London
Attendance: 84,584
Referee: N. Whittaker
