= List of Burnley F.C. managers =

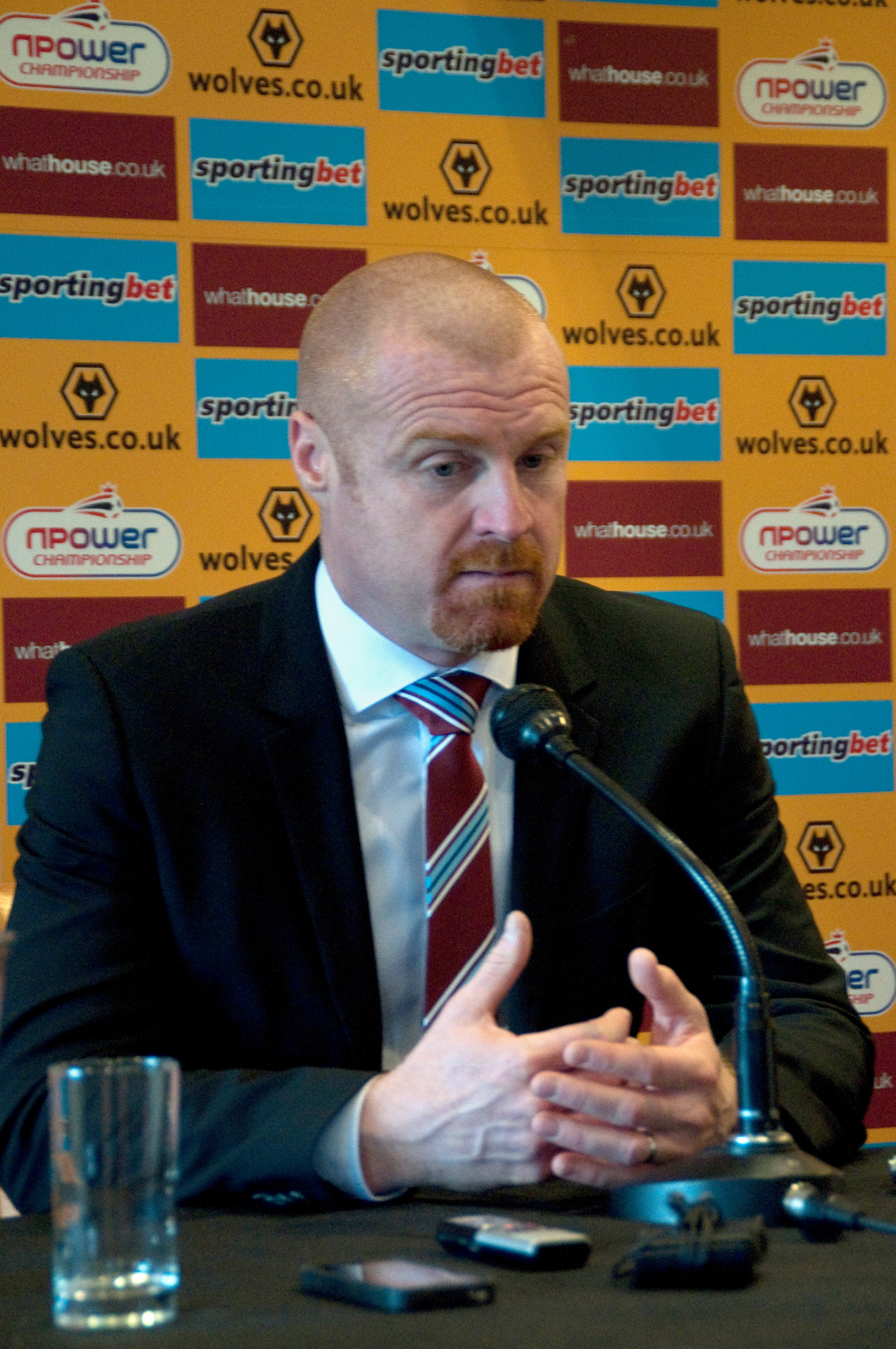
Sean Dyche was Burnley's manager from 2012 to 2022, and guided the club to two promotions to the Premier League.

Burnley Football Club is an English professional association football club based in the town of Burnley, Lancashire. Founded on 18 May 1882, the club was one of the first to become professional (in 1883), putting pressure on the Football Association (FA) to permit payments to players. In 1885, the FA legalised professionalism, so the team entered the FA Cup for the first time in 1885–86, and were one of the twelve founding members of the Football League in 1888–89. Burnley have played in all four professional divisions of English football from 1888 to the present day. The team have been champions of England twice, in 1920–21 and 1959–60, have won the FA Cup once, in 1913–14, and have won the FA Charity Shield twice, in 1960 and 1973. Burnley were the second, and are one of only five teams to have won all four professional divisions of English football, along with Wolverhampton Wanderers, Preston North End, Sheffield United and Portsmouth.

From 1882 to 1894, the Burnley team was selected by the board of directors or a committee whose secretary had the same powers and role as a manager has today. In August 1894, the club appointed a team manager for the first time. Burnley-born Harry Bradshaw was appointed; he had been involved with the club since its foundation in 1882 and he had been a committee member since 1887. Scotsman Frank Hill, who was in charge of Burnley from October 1948 to August 1954, was the first non-English manager in the club's history. From 1954 to 1983, under chairman Bob Lord, only managers with a previous playing career at the club were appointed—this trend ended when John Bond took the post in June 1983. Two Burnley managers have died in the job—Spen Whittaker and John Haworth.

The longest-serving person to manage Burnley is Harry Potts, who was in charge of the club for a total of 745 competitive matches: from February 1958 to February 1970 and from February 1977 to October 1979. Haworth and Potts are Burnley's most successful managers in terms of competitive honours won, as Haworth claimed one FA Cup (1913–14) and one First Division title (1920–21), while Potts won one First Division championship (1959–60) and the 1960 Charity Shield.

From 2024 onwards, Burnley have appointed a head coach rather than a manager; the two roles are broadly similar, although a manager typically has greater influence over player recruitment. Throughout their history, Burnley have had 32 permanent managers or head coaches and 6 caretakers in total. The club's current head coach is Fabio Celestini, who was appointed in October 2026.

== List of managers ==
Key

- Statistics are correct as of the match played on 24 October 2026.
- Only competitive matches are counted, except the abandoned 1939–40 Football League season and matches in Wartime Leagues and Cups.
- Names of caretaker managers are highlighted in italics and marked with an asterisk (*).
- Names of player-managers are marked with a double-dagger (‡).

List of Burnley F.C. managers
Manager	Nationality	From	To	Matches	Won	Drawn (Note: Drawn matches decided by penalty shoot-outs are counted as draws.)	Lost	Win% (Note: Win% is rounded to two decimal places)	Honours	Notes	Ref.
Harry Bradshaw	England	August 1894	June 1899	172	68	39	65	39.53	Second Division title: 1897–98	(Note: Harry Bradshaw combined managerial and secretarial duties from March 1897.) (Note: Following Harry Bradshaw's departure to Woolwich Arsenal in June 1899, team affairs remained in the hands of the board of directors until Ernest Mangnall was appointed in March 1900.)	
Ernest Mangnall	England	March 1900	October 1903	133	47	27	59	35.34		(Note: Ernest Mangnall, Spen Whittaker and John Haworth combined managerial and secretarial duties during their tenures.)	
Spen Whittaker	England	October 1903	April 1910	262	107	46	109	40.84		(Note: Following the death of Spen Whittaker in April 1910, team affairs were placed in the hands of the directors until the end of the season.)	
John Haworth	England	July 1910	December 1924	456	205	110	141	44.96	Second Division promotion: 1912–13; FA Cup winners: 1913–14; First Division runners–up: 1919–20; First Division title: 1920–21; FA Charity Shield runners–up: 1921		
Albert Pickles	England	January 1925	August 1932	335	117	72	146	34.93		(Note: Albert Pickles also assumed secretarial duties until May 1931.)	
Tom Bromilow	England	October 1932	July 1935	127	50	27	50	39.37		(Note: Tom Bromilow also assumed secretarial duties until November 1932.)	
Selection Committee		July 1935	September 1939	177	63	44	70	35.59		(Note: After Tom Bromilow left the club in 1935 to manage Crystal Palace, the directors decided to not appoint a team manager due to economical reasons. Team affairs became a joint effort between chairman Tom Clegg, secretary Alf Boland and senior trainer Billy Dougall.)	
Cliff Britton	England	May 1945	September 1948	107	52	31	24	48.60	FA Cup runners–up: 1946–47; Second Division promotion: 1946–47		
Frank Hill	Scotland	October 1948	August 1954	257	102	67	88	39.69			
Alan Brown	England	August 1954	July 1957	135	56	31	48	41.48		(Note: Formerly played for the club)	
Billy Dougall	Scotland	July 1957	January 1958	30	14	4	12	46.67		(Note: After Billy Dougall was hospitalised in November 1957, Ray Bennion assumed first-team duties. Dougall was forced to step down in January 1958 due to ill health, but remained at Burnley as physiotherapist until 1965.)	
Harry Potts	England	February 1958	February 1970	605	272	142	191	44.96	First Division title: 1959–60; FA Charity Shield winners (shared): 1960; First Division runners–up: 1961–62; FA Cup runners–up: 1961–62	(Note: Harry Potts served two terms as manager. His cumulative managerial statistics read as – 745 matches, 321 wins, 177 draws, 247 losses, and a winning percentage of 43.09%.)	
Jimmy Adamson	England	February 1970	January 1976	284	112	73	99	39.44	Second Division title: 1972–73; FA Charity Shield winners: 1973; Texaco Cup runners–up: 1973–74		
Joe Brown	England	January 1976	February 1977	52	11	16	25	21.15			
Harry Potts	England	February 1977	October 1979	140	49	35	56	35.00	Anglo–Scottish Cup winners: 1978–79		
Brian Miller	England	October 1979	January 1983	180	67	53	60	37.22	Third Division title: 1981–82	(Note: Brian Miller served two terms as manager. His cumulative managerial statistics read as – 320 matches, 117 wins, 85 draws, 118 losses, and a winning percentage of 36.56%.)	
Frank Casper*	England	January 1983	June 1983	26	11	6	9	42.31		(Note: Frank Casper served two terms as manager, including one spell as caretaker manager. His cumulative managerial statistics read as – 176 matches, 65 wins, 44 draws, 67 losses, and a winning percentage of 36.93%.)	
John Bond	England	June 1983	August 1984	57	21	16	20	36.84			
John Benson	Scotland	August 1984	May 1985	57	16	15	26	28.07			
Martin Buchan	Scotland	June 1985	October 1985	13	5	2	6	38.46			
Tommy Cavanagh	England	October 1985	June 1986	39	14	10	15	35.90			
Brian Miller	England	July 1986	January 1989	140	50	32	58	35.71	Associate Members' Cup runners–up: 1987–88		
Frank Casper	England	January 1989	October 1991	150	54	38	58	36.00			
Jimmy Mullen	England	October 1991	February 1996	252	102	67	83	40.48	Fourth Division title: 1991–92; Second Division play–off winners: 1993–94		
Clive Middlemass*	England	February 1996	March 1996	3	0	1	2	0.00			
Adrian Heath ‡	England	March 1996	June 1997	72	27	17	28	37.50			
Chris Waddle ‡	England	July 1997	May 1998	57	17	16	24	29.82			
Stan Ternent	England	June 1998	June 2004	312	122	82	108	39.10	Second Division (third tier) promotion: 1999–2000		
Steve Cotterill	England	June 2004	November 2007	169	55	48	66	32.54			
Steve Davis*	England	November 2007	November 2007	1	1	0	0	100.00			
Owen Coyle	Ireland	November 2007	January 2010	116	49	29	38	42.24	Championship play–off winners: 2008–09		
Brian Laws	England	January 2010	December 2010	44	13	9	22	29.55			
Stuart Gray*	England	December 2010	January 2011	4	2	1	1	50.00			
Eddie Howe	England	January 2011	October 2012	87	34	19	34	39.08			
Terry Pashley*	England	October 2012	October 2012	3	2	0	1	66.67			
Sean Dyche	England	October 2012	April 2022	425	149	118	158	35.06	Championship promotion: 2013–14; Championship title: 2015–16		
Mike Jackson*	England	April 2022	May 2022	8	3	2	3	37.50			
Vincent Kompany	Belgium	June 2022	May 2024	96	41	24	31	42.71	Championship title: 2022–23		
Scott Parker	England	July 2024	April 2026	88	36	24	28	40.91	Championship promotion: 2024–25	(Note: Named head coach instead of manager)	
Mike Jackson*	England	April 2026	May 2026	4	0	2	2	0.00			
Nicky Hayen	Belgium	July 2026	October 2026	14	1	7	6	7.14			
Fabio Celestini	Switzerland	October 2026									
