= Albert Pickles =

Albert Pickles is the name of:

- Albert Pickles (footballer, born 1877), for Burnley
- Albert Pickles (footballer, born 1905), for Bradford City
