= Wadge =

Wadge is a surname. Notable people with the surname include:

- Amy Wadge (born 1975), English singer and songwriter
- Eric Wadge, Maltese musician
- Richard Wadge (1864–1923), English football director
- Selina Wadge (1850–1878), English executed criminal

== See also ==
- Wedge (surname)
