= Aqualate Hall =

Country house in Forton, Staffordshire, England

Coordinates: 52.7745°N 2.3363°W

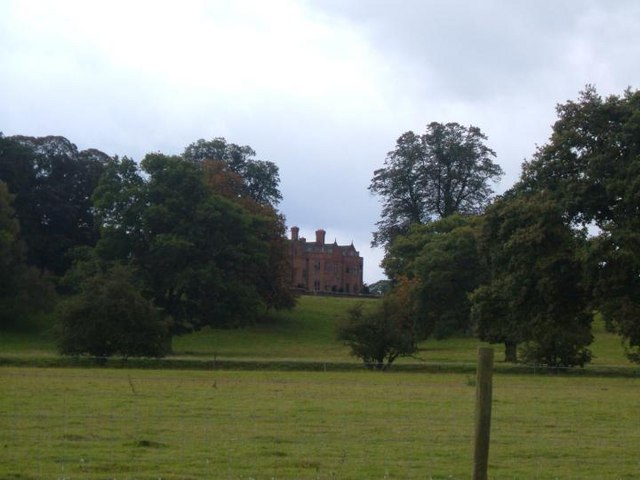
Aqualate Hall in Staffordshire

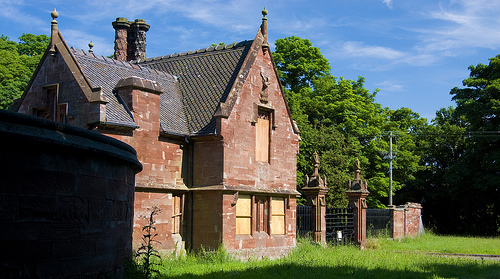
A private estate, nobody can walk past the Gatehouse to Aqualate Hall

Aqualate Hall, a 20th-century country house, is located in Forton, Staffordshire, England, some 2 miles (3.2 km) east of the market town of Newport, Shropshire and 10 miles (16 km) west of the county town of Stafford. It is a Grade II* listed building.

== History ==
The site of the house may have been occupied in Roman times as two food vessels were found during drainage of the grounds.

The first manor house on the site, built above the Aqualate Mere in the 16th century by Thomas Skrymsher was rebuilt for Edwin Skrymsher (Member of Parliament for Stafford) in the 17th century just after he had completed nearby Forton Hall. The original building remained in much the same style until, Sir John Boughey bought the house in the late 18th century and in 1808 commissioned John Nash to rebuild it in the Gothic style. Sir Thomas Boughey developed the house, grounds and associated village in the 1830s.

The building was destroyed by fire on 28 November 1910. The present house, which incorporates some elements of the 17th-century house and of Nash's Gothic successor, was built between 1927 and 1930 by W. D. Caröe. An original range of gables by Nash joins the new house to an 18th-century stable block.

During World War II the house was used an evacuation home. The grounds were used as a military transport base run by the Auxiliary Territorial Service. The Nissen huts which they left behind were then used by the homeless until 1952.

== Etymology ==
The name Aqualate is from Anglo-Saxon Āc-gelād, possibly in the sense "difficult passage over wet ground by the oak trees"; there is much wet and boggy ground in the area and a mere, although Eilert Ekwall suggests Old English Āc-gelãd meaning "oak stream".

== Architecture ==
The square red brick building has clay tile roofs. It has a service wing on the east side. The north front has a two-storey polygonal porch, two projecting canted bays and is decorated with armorial shields and a carved head which used to be on a gatepost. In the grounds can be found stables, two Gothic lodge-houses, and a red brick house with an attached castellated tower.

There is now no sign of the original formal gardens but the boundary of the deer park can still be identified. This contains plantations of oak trees.

== See also ==
- Grade II* listed buildings in Stafford (borough)
- Listed buildings in Forton, Staffordshire
- Aqualate mere
