= Alfred Newman =

American composer (1900-1970)

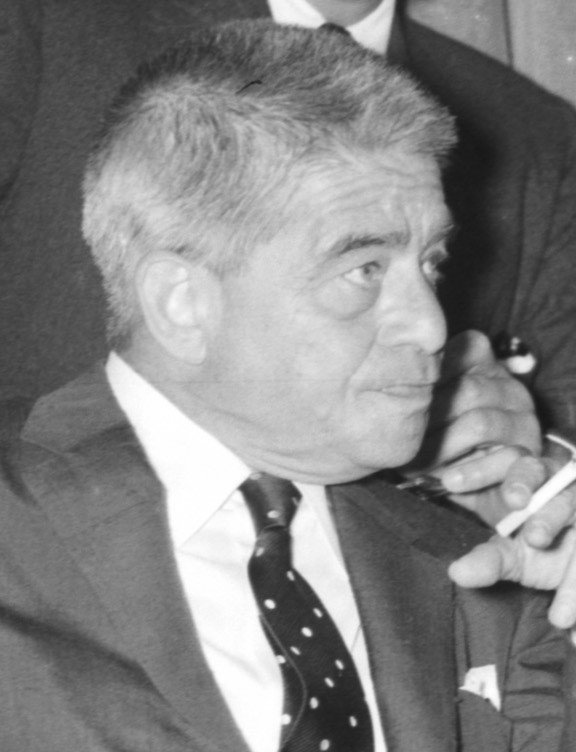
- Newman in 1958
- Born: March 17, 1900; New Haven, Connecticut, U.S.
- Died: February 17, 1970 (aged 69); Los Angeles, California, U.S.
- Resting place: Forest Lawn Memorial Park, Glendale
- Occupations: Composer, conductor, arranger
- Spouse: Martha Louise Montgomery (m. 1947)
- Children: 5, including David, Thomas, and Maria Newman
- Relatives: Emil Newman (brother); Lionel Newman (brother); Randy Newman (nephew); Joey Newman (grandnephew)
- Awards: Academy Awards (x9)
- Musical career
- Genres: Film score
- Years active: 1915–1970

Alfred Newman (March 17, 1900 – February 17, 1970) was an American composer, arranger, and conductor of film music. From his start as a music prodigy, he came to be regarded as a respected figure in the history of film music. He won nine Academy Awards and was nominated 45 times, contributing to the extended Newman family being the most Academy Award-nominated family with a collective 92 nominations in various music categories.

In a career spanning more than four decades, Newman composed the scores for over 200 motion pictures. Some of his most famous scores include Wuthering Heights, The Hunchback of Notre Dame, The Mark of Zorro, How Green Was My Valley, The Song of Bernadette, Captain from Castile, All About Eve, Love Is a Many Splendored Thing, Anastasia, The Diary of Anne Frank, How the West Was Won, The Greatest Story Ever Told, and his final score, Airport, all of which were nominated for or won Academy Awards. He is perhaps best known for composing the fanfare which accompanies the studio logo at the beginning of 20th Century Fox's productions. Prior to commencing his employment with 20th Century Fox, Newman composed the fanfares which are most often associated with Samuel Goldwyn productions and David O. Selznick productions.

Newman was also highly regarded as a conductor, and arranged and conducted many scores by other composers, including George Gershwin, Charlie Chaplin, and Irving Berlin. He also conducted the music for many film adaptations of Broadway musicals (having worked on Broadway for ten years before coming to Hollywood), as well as many original Hollywood musicals.

He was among the first musicians to compose and conduct original music during Hollywood's Golden Age of movies, later becoming a respected and powerful music director in the history of Hollywood. Newman and two of his fellow composers, Max Steiner and Dimitri Tiomkin, were considered the "three godfathers of film music".

== Early life ==
Newman was born on March 17, 1900, in New Haven, Connecticut, the eldest of ten children to Russian-Jewish parents who emigrated shortly before his birth. Although many sources show a birth year of 1901, musicologist and composer Fred Steiner revealed that Alfred was actually born in 1900. His father, Michael Newman (born Nemorofsky), was a produce dealer and his mother, Luba (née Koskoff), took care of the family. Her father had been a cantor in Russia, which contributed to her love of music. She sent Newman, her first born, to a local piano teacher to begin lessons when he was five. At one point, in order to take lessons, he walked a ten-mile round trip. With barely enough to live on, his parents once had to sell their dog to make ends meet.

By the age of eight, Newman had become known locally as a piano prodigy. His talent led virtuoso Ignacy Jan Paderewski to arrange a recital for him in New York, where Sigismund Stojowski and Alexander Lambert, at different periods, took him as a pupil. To save Newman commuting cost, Stojowski convinced a ticket inspector to let young Newman sometimes travel free. Stojowski offered him a scholarship, after which Newman won a silver medal and a gold medal in a competition. He also studied harmony, counterpoint and composition with Rubin Goldmark and George Wedge.

=== Early jobs as pianist ===
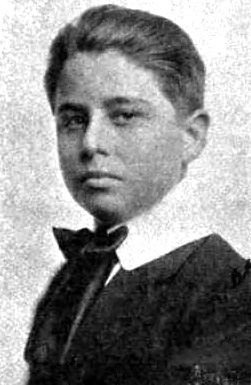
Newman in 1913

By the time Newman was 12, however, his parents' meager income was not enough to support his large family, which led to him searching for ways to earn an income from music to help his family. He then began playing in theaters and restaurants, including the Strand theater and the Harlem Opera House, with a schedule that often had him playing five shows a day. During the shows, he typically accompanied singers as pianist. Grace La Rue, star of one of the shows, was taken by Newman's talent and signed him on as her regular accompanist.

Newman, at 13, also attracted the attention of author Ella Wheeler Wilcox, who wanted to promote him to those who could further his music ambition. She greatly admired his ability to play Mendelssohn, Chopin, Liszt, Wagner and other composers, and with equal skill, in her opinion, as Paderewski. She said he "possessed most unusual moral qualities and characteristics":

He is a beautiful looking boy, modest, gentle, unassuming, and wholly unspoiled. I am not interested in him merely because he renders the great masters marvelously and even composes wonderfully, but rather because he has such a rare and interesting nature. His father is a poor Russian fruit dealer and Alfred is the oldest of eight children. The mother is a very beautiful woman, and both parents show good blood and breeding despite their humble position and lack of means. The family has made every possible sacrifice in order to educate this boy in music, and he has a most deep-seated sense of noblesse oblige. His whole desire for success seems based upon his anxiety to make his parents happy and to repay them for what they have done for him. (Note: Wilcox also attributed his talent to his ethnicity, adding, "The Russian Jews are people of marvelous talent, indeed all the Hebrew races, wherever they are found, seem to abound in talent.")

He began traveling the vaudeville circuit with La Rue's show when he was 13, where she billed him as "The Marvelous Boy Pianist". While on tours, he was sometimes allowed to conduct the orchestras. This led to him making conducting his career goal, an ambition furthered by William Merrigan Daly, an experienced music director and composer who taught Newman the basics of conducting. By the time he was fifteen, he was regularly conducting performances for matinee shows. Cincinnati Symphony conductor Fritz Reiner was so impressed by Newman, he invited him to be a guest conductor.

=== Full-time Broadway conductor ===
When he was nineteen, he began conducting full-time in New York City, the beginning of a ten-year career on Broadway as the conductor of musicals by composers such as George Gershwin, Richard Rodgers, and Jerome Kern. He conducted George White's Scandals in 1919, Funny Face in 1927 and Treasure Girl in 1929. Newman said he was always happiest as a conductor: "I studied music composition and counterpoint because I wanted to be a good conductor."

In 1930, songwriter and composer Irving Berlin invited him to Hollywood to conduct his score for the film Reaching for the Moon. Although the musical film was originally planned to include songs written by Berlin, problems developed between him and director Edmund Goulding, which led to most of his songs being taken out. Newman was kept on and received credit for directing the music, which became his Hollywood debut.

== Film scoring career ==
=== 1930s ===
The 20th Century-Fox production logo and fanfare (as seen in 1947)

Soon after Newman arrived in Hollywood in 1930 and finished directing the score for Reaching for the Moon, producer Samuel Goldwyn offered him a contract to continue on as a movie composer. His first complete film score was for Goldwyn's Street Scene in 1931. The score mirrored the busy and frantic sounds of everyday life in New York's Lower East Side in the 1930s. He later used that music theme in other films, such as How to Marry a Millionaire in 1953, which opens with him conducting an orchestra. The theme is also used in Gentleman's Agreement, I Wake Up Screaming, The Dark Corner, Cry of the City, Kiss of Death, and Where the Sidewalk Ends.

In 1931, Charlie Chaplin hired him to orchestrate his film City Lights, and used Newman again for Modern Times in 1936. Hollywood reporter Sidney Skolsky observed them working together as Newman conducted the 65-piece orchestra. He described Newman's ability to carefully synchronize the music to scenes, such as the factory sequence, where Chaplin throws the place into confusion. The music was timed to Chaplin's movements.

Newman became Goldwyn's favorite composer, while his style evolved with each new film he scored. He scored numerous adventure stories and romances, historical pageants and swashbuckling epics, as did his contemporary, Erich Wolfgang Korngold. Newman also began taking lessons with Arnold Schoenberg, who emigrated to the U.S. from Europe in 1934. In 1937, Newman organized a private recording of Schoenberg’s four string quartets by the Kolisch Quartet at the United Artists.

He received his first Academy Award for Alexander's Ragtime Band in 1938. In 1939, he wrote the music for Goldwyn's Wuthering Heights, starring Laurence Olivier and Merle Oberon. His score was unique in the way it included different musical themes and created different motifs for the key actors, which helped frame the action. The theme for Cathy, for instance, consisted of a glowing pastoral with strings, while Heathcliff's theme, in contrast, produced a darker, more serious image. Also in 1939, he composed the music for Gunga Din, and Beau Geste.

Among Newman's specialties were films with a religious theme, although he himself was not known to be religious. Among the films were The Hunchback of Notre Dame (1939), starring Charles Laughton, and in subsequent years, The Song of Bernadette (1943), The Robe (1953), and The Greatest Story Ever Told (1965).

In 1933, while he was still under contract at United Artists, Newman was commissioned by Darryl F. Zanuck of Twentieth Century Pictures to compose a fanfare to accompany the production logo appearing at the start of the studio's films. Twentieth Century Pictures subsequently merged with Fox Film Corporation in 1935 to form 20th Century-Fox; the fanfare and logo were retained, and have continued in use to the present day as one of the most widely recognised film studio logos.

=== 1940s ===
In 1940, Newman began a 20-year career as music director with 20th Century-Fox Studios, composing over 200 film scores, nine of which won Academy Awards. He wore many hats at the studio depending on the need, acting as composer, arranger, music director and conductor for various films. However, he said that he preferred arranging and conducting over composing because the latter was lonely and demanding work. The demands of work contributed to his heavy smoking throughout his life, eventually leading to his emphysema.

He was noted for developing what came to be known as the Newman System, a means of synchronizing the performance and recording of a musical score with the film, a system which is still in use today. Newman's scores were developed around the overall mood of each film. He also tailored specific themes to accompany different characters as they appeared on screen, thereby enhancing each actor's role. The effects of this style of music created a forceful but less jarring score which connected the entire story, thereby keeping the film's theme more easily understood by viewers.

The Song of Bernadette (1943) is said to be one of Newman's loveliest scores, recorded over a four-week period with an 80-piece orchestra. Newman used three different motifs to color different issues during the film. Among them was a brass chorale to represent Mother Church, while the theme representing Bernadette used strings to support her character's warmth and tenderness. Newman's interpretation added the sound of the wind and blowing leaves to give the music an ethereal quality that augmented Bernadette's visions.

Newman's score for Wilson (1944), a biopic about president Woodrow Wilson, required he devote an unusual amount of time to research. The film was intended to be a tribute to Wilson by producer Darryl F. Zanuck. Newman spent considerable time learning personal details about Wilson and his family, such as the songs they sang and played on their piano at home, the music they liked to dance and listen to, the songs they played during political rallies or political functions during his career. As a result, the film contained some forty realistic American-themed numbers intertwined throughout the film which gave it a strong sense of timeliness.

In the 1940s, Newman scored a number of films related to World War II. Among those were A Yank in the R.A.F. (1941), To the Shores of Tripoli (1942) and Twelve O'Clock High (1949), which one historian says is Newman's best dramatic opening theme for a movie. Newman also composed or music directed the score to some of Frank Capra's Why We Fight series of films, including Prelude to War (1942) and War Comes to America (1945). He created the music for The All-Star Bond Rally (1945), a documentary short film featuring Hollywood stars promoting the sales of War Bonds. The previous year he scored another documentary, The Fighting Lady (1944).

He often studied period music and assimilated it into his scores. For films such as How Green Was My Valley (1941), for example, he incorporated Welsh hymns. For How The West Was Won (1962), he took folk tunes and transformed them into orchestral/choral works of tremendous power. And for The Grapes of Wrath (1940), he brought in the folk tune favorite "Red River Valley" throughout the score. His skill at incorporating familiar traditional music into modern scores was not limited to Western themes, however. During portions of the score for Love is a Many Splendored Thing, for example, he created numbers with a distinctly Chinese sensibility, both with instruments and melodies. Generally, however, he would create his own original melody and turn it into something haunting and memorable, as he did for The Robe (1953).

In 1947, he composed the music for Captain from Castile, which included the famous "Conquest march", an impassioned score for the Spanish conquistadors. The march was adapted by the University of Southern California (USC) as the official theme song for their sports teams, the USC Trojans. Newman also orchestrated and conducted the music for a biopic about the life of American composer John Philip Sousa, Stars and Stripes Forever (1952), a film which includes numerous marches for which Sousa is best known.

The dramatic score for The Snake Pit, a 1948 film set in a lunatic asylum, was accentuated by Newman's careful use of effects to intensify the discomfort and fear portrayed by the actors, primarily its star Olivia de Havilland.

=== 1950s ===
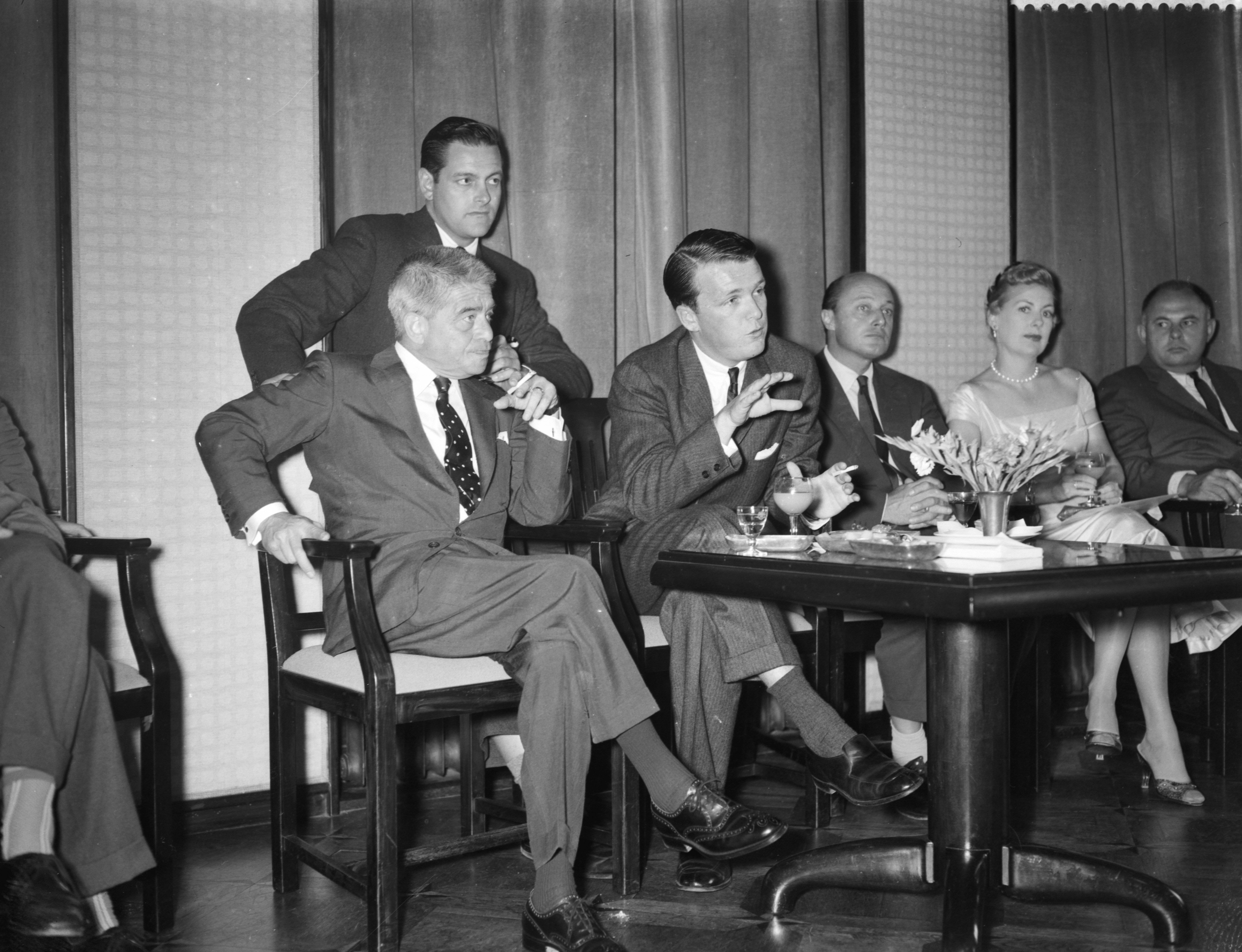
Alfred Newman (center-left) and associate producer George Stevens Jr. discuss The Diary of Anne Frank at a press conference in Amsterdam (July 1958)

In 1952, With a Song in My Heart gave Newman his fifth Academy Award. It was presented to him by Walt Disney. The Robe (1953), a New Testament epic, was another of Newman's scores with a religious theme, with orchestration creating spaciousness, grandeur and simplicity. The first film in Cinemascope, it featured 4 channel stereo sound, which allowed Newman to experiment in developing the various moods. The score was one of fellow composer Franz Waxman's favorites, and he incorporated some of its themes into his own score for the film's sequel, Demetrius and the Gladiators.

In 1954, Newman wrote additional music for his 20th Century-Fox fanfare, extending it with several bars of warm, soaring strings in order to promote the studio's adoption of the new CinemaScope presentation. This extended version has remained in use ever since. This fanfare was re-recorded in 1997 by his son David, also a composer, and it is this rendition that is used today.

Newman received his eighth Oscar for The King and I in 1956. In 1959 Newman composed the score for The Diary of Anne Frank. Although based on the true-life tragic story of a young girl during World War II, Newman's score focuses on her optimistic personality, which as her diary attests, she continued to believe that people were good at heart. In contrast to Newman's use of uplifting violins and a hopeful old European sound for the girl, the score for the Nazis was an "oppressive march in half time" to create a fearsome effect. Music historian Christopher Palmer says that the score is one of Newman's finest, which because of its style, elegance and integrity, the emotions portrayed by the actors can be physically "felt" by the audience. It was nominated for an Oscar.

=== 1960s ===
Newman's final musical score under his Fox contract was The Best of Everything (1959), and after leaving Fox in 1960, Newman freelanced for the remainder of his career, writing the scores for such films as MGM's How the West Was Won (1962), which some consider his most familiar and best score. It is listed on AFI's 100 Years of Film Scores. That score and The Greatest Story Ever Told (1965) were nominated for an Oscar. The last project proved to be a bitter disappointment for Newman, when director George Stevens extensively re-edited the film and score. Other composers had to help reconstitute musical segments, and Newman's two choral finales were replaced by the familiar "Hallelujah Chorus" of George Frideric Handel. Newman's longtime associate and choral director, Ken Darby, described the experience in Hollywood Holyland: The Filming and Scoring of "The Greatest Story Ever Told" (Metuchen, New Jersey: Scarecrow Press, 1992).

Newman remained active until the end of his life, scoring Universal Pictures' Airport (1970) shortly before his death.

== Death ==
Newman died on February 17, 1970, at the age of 69, a month shy of his 70th birthday, at his home in Pacific Palisades, Los Angeles, from complications of emphysema.

== Legacy ==
Arriving in Hollywood just as talking pictures were getting more technically sophisticated, he contributed to creating the musical sound of the era and was at the heart of the studio system at its peak...The passing of Newman was symbolic of the end of a golden age.

— Thomas Hischak
The Encyclopedia of Film Composers

In the fourth edition of the All Music Guide, writer Bruce Eder described Newman as "the most influential and respected composer and music director" of his time. He received 45 Oscar nominations, and his 9 Academy Awards were more than any other musical director or composer had received.

His nine Academy Awards are the most received by any musician: Alexander's Ragtime Band (1938), Tin Pan Alley (1940), The Song of Bernadette (1943), Mother Wore Tights (1947), With a Song in My Heart (1952), Call Me Madam (1953), Love Is a Many-Splendored Thing (1955), The King and I (1956) and Camelot (1967). Song of Bernadette and Love Is a Many-Splendored Thing are original scores, the latter with extensive use of a theme song by Sammy Fain. The other films are musical adaptations, a field in which Newman reigned supreme.

He composed the familiar fanfare which accompanies the studio logo at the beginning of 20th Century's productions, and still introduces 20th Century pictures today. A segment of Newman's score for David O. Selznick's The Prisoner of Zenda (1937) became the standard music which accompanied the Selznick International Pictures logo when introducing its films. Newman's collections of orchestral scores and sets of parts is now in the library of the University of Southern California's USC School of Cinematic Arts. For USC, their 280-seat Allan Hancock Auditorium was renovated and re-dedicated as the Alfred Newman Recital Hall in 1999.

Newman was one of those rare Hollywood souls who generously nurtured the talents and careers of many other men who became legends in the field of film composition—including Bernard Herrmann, David Raksin and John Williams.

— Classic Themes

While a composer, music director and conductor, he often contributed to the scores of others without credit. When he wasn't working on a particular movie, he was often approached by studio production heads needing advice, which he freely gave. Other musicians were constantly exploring new ideas or perfecting older techniques, which required sharing their knowledge with each other. Newman, during his years as a music director, sometimes went further: if one of his composers was stumped for a suitable melody, for instance, Newman would sometimes write a few bars on paper and hand it to the composer, suggesting he try it out.

As a music director, it was Newman's job to find and select suitable composers for various films. When he saw a composer's potential, he also had the power to sign them to long term staff contracts. Music historian Robert R. Faulkner is of the opinion that had Newman not been music director at Twentieth Century Fox, composers such as Bernard Herrmann, Alex North, and David Raksin, all of whose music was somewhat radical, might never have had such major careers in Hollywood.

The legacy of Alfred Newman and his influence on the language of music for the cinema is practically unmatched by anyone in Hollywood history. As an executive, he was hard but fair. As a mentor to his staff he was revered. The orchestras under his baton delighted in his abilities as a conductor. The music he himself composed, often under extreme emotional duress, is among the most gorgeous ever written. […] Not big in physical stature, he was a giant in character, a titan in the world he loved and dominated. He was a true musical force, and one that cannot in any sense be replaced.

— Nick Redman, producer

In 1999, the United States Postal Service issued a stamp in his honor.

== Partial filmography ==
Between 1930 and 1970, Alfred Newman wrote music for over 200 films of every imaginable type, including a score for the newsreel made from the World War II footage of the Battle of Midway. In addition to his own film scores, Newman acted as musical director on numerous other films. Among his major film scores (and adaptations of other composers' scores) are:

- 1930 – Whoopee!
- 1931 – City Lights (musical director) (music by Charlie Chaplin)
- 1931 – Indiscreet (musical director)
- 1931 – Street Scene
- 1933 – The Masquerader
- 1936 – Dodsworth
- 1936 – Born to Dance (musical director; Cole Porter wrote the songs)
- 1937 – You Only Live Once
- 1937 – The Hurricane (Academy Award nomination for Best Musical Score)
- 1937 – The Prisoner of Zenda (Academy Award nomination for Best Musical Score)
- 1938 – Alexander's Ragtime Band (Academy Award) (adaptation, the songs were by Irving Berlin)
- 1939 – The Rains Came
- 1939 – Gunga Din
- 1939 – Wuthering Heights (Academy Award nomination for best musical score)
- 1939 – The Hunchback of Notre Dame (Academy Award nomination for Best Musical Score)
- 1940 – Vigil in the Night
- 1940 – Foreign Correspondent
- 1940 – Broadway Melody of 1940 (musical director; again, Cole Porter wrote the songs)
- 1940 – The Mark of Zorro (Academy Award nomination for Best Musical Score)
- 1940 – Tin Pan Alley (Academy Award) (adaptation; the film used old popular songs such as The Sheik of Araby)
- 1941 – How Green Was My Valley (Academy Award nomination for Best Musical Score)
- 1942 – Roxie Hart
- 1942 – The Black Swan
- 1942 – The Pied Piper
- 1943 – The Song of Bernadette (Academy Award)
- 1943 – My Friend Flicka
- 1943 - The Moon Is Down
- 1944 – The Keys of the Kingdom (Academy Award nomination for Best Musical Score)
- 1945 – State Fair (adaptation only; this was the musical version by Rodgers and Hammerstein) (Academy Award nomination for Best Adaptation of a Musical Score)
- 1947 – Captain from Castile (Academy Award nomination for Best Musical Score)
- 1947 – Mother Wore Tights (adaptation) (Academy Award)
- 1947 – Gentleman's Agreement
- 1947 – The Shocking Miss Pilgrim
- 1947 – Miracle on 34th Street
- 1948 – Cry of the City
- 1948 – The Snake Pit
- 1948 – That Lady in Ermine
- 1948 – The Iron Curtain
- 1949 – Twelve O'Clock High
- 1949 – Chicken Every Sunday
- 1949 – Pinky
- 1950 – All About Eve (Academy Award nomination for Best Musical Score)
- 1950 – Panic in the Streets
- 1950 – The Big Lift
- 1951 – David and Bathsheba (Academy Award nomination for Best Musical Score)
- 1952 – The Prisoner of Zenda
- 1952 – With a Song in My Heart (adaptation only; this musical contained songs by several composers, but Newman was not one of them) (Academy Award)
- 1952 – Stars and Stripes Forever (conductor; the soundtrack album Stars and Stripes Forever rose to No. 1 on Billboard's album chart)
- 1953 – How to Marry a Millionaire (Alfred Newman appears conducting an orchestra in the prologue. The music is from Street Scene.)
- 1953 – The Robe
- 1953 – Call Me Madam (adaptation; the songs were by Irving Berlin) (Academy Award)
- 1955 – A Man Called Peter
- 1955 – Love Is a Many-Splendored Thing (Academy Award)
- 1955 – The Seven Year Itch
- 1956 – Anastasia
- 1956 – Carousel (adaptation, the songs were by Rodgers and Hammerstein)
- 1956 – The King and I (adaptation; the songs were by Rodgers and Hammerstein) (Academy Award)
- 1957 – April Love (adaptation)
- 1958 – South Pacific (Conductor; the songs were by Rodgers and Hammerstein)
- 1958 – A Certain Smile
- 1959 – The Diary of Anne Frank (Academy Award nomination for Best Musical Score)
- 1961 – Flower Drum Song (adaptation; the songs were again by Rodgers and Hammerstein)
- 1962 – The Counterfeit Traitor
- 1962 – State Fair (remake of musical version) (adaptation only; the songs were again by Rodgers and Hammerstein, with additional songs by Richard Rodgers only)
- 1962 – How the West Was Won (Academy Award nomination for Best Musical Score)
- 1965 – The Greatest Story Ever Told (Academy Award nomination for Best Musical Score)
- 1966 – Nevada Smith
- 1967 – Camelot (adaptation; the songs were by Alan Jay Lerner and Frederick Loewe) (Academy Award)
- 1968 – Firecreek
- 1970 – Airport

== Awards ==
Newman won nine Academy Awards, the third highest number of Oscars ever won by an individual (Walt Disney won twenty-six, Cedric Gibbons won eleven) and was nominated for forty-five, making him the most nominated composer in Oscar history until 2011, when John Williams broke the record. Forty-three of Newman's nominations were for Best Original Score (making him the second most nominated in that category after John Williams) and two were for Original Song.

The American Film Institute ranked his score for How the West Was Won as No. 25 on their list of the 25 greatest film scores. Ten of Newman's other scores were also nominated:

- Wuthering Heights (1939)
- The Hunchback of Notre Dame (1939)
- How Green Was My Valley (1941)
- The Song of Bernadette (1943)
- Captain from Castile (1947)
- All About Eve (1950)
- The Robe (1953)
- Love Is a Many-Splendored Thing (1955)
- The Greatest Story Ever Told (1965)
- Airport (1970)

Newman has a star on the Hollywood Walk of Fame at 1700 Vine Street.

== Newman family ==
He married Martha Louise Montgomery (born December 5, 1920, Clarksdale, Mississippi - died May 9, 2005, Pacific Palisades, California), a former actress and Goldwyn Girl; they had five children.

He was the head of a family of major Hollywood film composers being the most Academy Award-nominated family, with a collective 92 nominations in various music categories.

- His brother Lionel Newman scored three dozen films and several TV series, adapting and conducting scores for hundreds of other films; he succeeded Alfred as Fox's music director.
- His brother Emil Newman was music director for over eighty films.
- His son David Newman has scored nearly one hundred films, including The War of the Roses, Hoffa, The Nutty Professor, Anastasia, Galaxy Quest, Ice Age, and Serenity, and has received an Academy Award nomination.
- His son Thomas Newman has scored over seventy-five films, including Little Women, The Shawshank Redemption, Unstrung Heroes, American Beauty, The Green Mile, Road to Perdition, Finding Nemo, Lemony Snicket's A Series of Unfortunate Events, The Good German, WALL-E, The Help, Skyfall, Saving Mr. Banks, Finding Dory, and 1917, and has received fifteen Academy Award nominations.
- His daughter Maria Newman is a musician and composer.
- His nephew Randy Newman is a two-time Academy Award winner, noted not only for his film work but also for a series of popular albums as a singer/songwriter.
- His grandnephew Joey Newman has scored many TV series, films, and video games.
- His granddaughter Jaclyn Newman is a music editor, and won a Golden Reel Award for 30 Days of Night: Dark Days, and has received additional nominations for Burlesque and Nashville.
- His wife, Martha Montgomery Newman, two years after being widowed, married film composer Robert O. Ragland, to whom she remained married for 33 years until her death.
