= Thomas Wedge =

Thomas Wedge may refer to:

- Thomas Wedge of Chester (1760–1854), agriculturalist
- Thomas Wedge (rugby union) (1881–1964), British rugby union player
