= Harry Burton (English footballer) =

English footballer

Personal information
- Full name: Henry Arthur Burton
- Date of birth: 1881
- Place of birth: West Bromwich, England
- Date of death: 28 August 1923 (aged 42)
- Place of death: Sheffield, England
- Position: Defender

Senior career*
Years	Team	Apps	(Gls)
- Chippingham
- Attercliffe
1902–1909	Sheffield Wednesday	198	
1909–1912	West Brom		
1912–	Scunthorpe United		
- * Club domestic league appearances and goals

Henry Arthur Burton (1881 – 28 August 1923) was an English professional footballer who played for Sheffield Wednesday, West Brom and Scunthorpe United.

== Sheffield Wednesday ==
Burton joined Sheffield Wednesday prior to the start of the 1902/03 season, from Attercliffe, but did not make an appearance for the first team that season, with Sheffield Wednesday going on to win the League in the 1902–03 season. Despite being born in West Bromwich Burton lived in the Sheffield area from the age of four, playing football for Huntman's Garden School, Chippingham and Attercliffe prior to signing for Sheffield Wednesday. In Burton's early career at Sheffield Wednesday he was described as a left-back who was "well built and clever" and competed for the left-back position with Ambrose Langley, who he eventually overtook as first choice in 1903. As a footballer with Sheffield Wednesday Burton won the Midland League, Wharncliffe Charity Cup, Sheffield Challenge Cup a Sheffield Charity match medal and a Sheriff of London (Dewar) Charity medal also winning major honours when the team retained the League title in the 1903–04 season and he also played in the victorious 1907 FA Cup final.

== West Brom ==
As proven by newspaper reports from the time, in March 1909 Burton was unexpectedly transferred to West Brom, in a double transfer involving teammate George Simpson. Newspapers and fans alike were shocked by the sudden departure, which "came as a surprise to the great majority of Sheffield Wednesday supporters." The transfer was described as a "sensation", "sensational news" as "Burton was regarded as a permanent fixture at Owlerton". So loved was Burton at Sheffield Wednesday that in preseason in August 1909 he was reported as enjoying a night with his former Sheffield Wednesday team at Sheffield Hippodrome, despite being a West Brom player. Burton never quite replicated his form whilst at West Brom and by May 1911 had taken to placing advertisements in Athletic News seeking employment as a player or player manager.

== Scunthorpe United ==
After making efforts to find a new club following an unsuccessful time at West Brom in October 1912 Burton transferred to Scunthorpe United, his first appearance for them coming against Mexborough Town in the Midland League.

== International ==
Burton never made a single international appearance for the England national football team, despite being a regular in a Sheffield Wednesday team that won major honours, though it was reported that he "more than once must have verged on (becoming an) international".

== Family ==
Census records show that in 1901 Harry was boarding with the Darlow family on Staniforth Road in Attercliffe, where he was employed as a printer. In 1907 he married Florrie, also of Attercliffe, and the 1911 census records them living at 50 Hope Street, West Bromwich, where he was still a professional footballer. Following retirement, Harry worked for Messrs John Brown and Co Ltd, a mill, who along with representatives of his former football clubs attended his funeral in Tinsley, Sheffield, in August 1923.
