= Listed buildings in Forton, Staffordshire =

Forton is a civil parish in the Borough of Stafford, Staffordshire, England. It contains eleven listed buildings that are recorded in the National Heritage List for England. Of these, three are at Grade II*, the middle of the three grades, and the others are at Grade II, the lowest grade. The parish contains the village of Forton and the surrounding area, which includes Aqualate Park. In the park is Aqualate Hall, a country house which is listed, together with other buildings in the park. The other listed buildings are houses, a church, a bridge, and a structure which is either a folly or and ruined windmill.

== Key ==
Grade	Criteria
II*	Particularly important buildings of more than special interest
II	Buildings of national importance and special interest

== Buildings ==
Name and location	Photograph	Date	Notes	Grade
All Saints Church; 52.78770°N 2.36437°W		12th century {possible)	The church has been altered and extended during the following centuries. It is built in sandstone, and consists of a nave, a north aisle, a chancel, and a west tower. The base of the tower dates from the 13th century, and the upper part is Perpendicular in style; it has angle buttresses, a decorated frieze, and eight pinnacles.	II*
Forton House; 52.78651°N 2.36539°W	—	17th century	The house is in stone and brick, and has a tile roof with three stone-coped gables and finials. There are two storeys, three bays, and a later rear extension. On the front is a doorway with a square surround, and the windows are mullioned with sashes.	II
Forton Hall; 52.78748°N 2.36492°W		1665	The house is in brick with stone dressings, a stone basement, a moulded string course, and a tile roof with coped gables. It is in Jacobean style, and has two storeys and an attic, and a symmetrical front of four bays with three gables. On the front is a porch with a gable and a ball finial, and the windows are mullioned.	II*
New Bridge; 52.78419°N 2.37222°W	—	1726	The bridge, which has been bypassed by the A519 road, carries a former road over the River Meese. It is in sandstone, and consists of two semicircular arches. The bridge has a plain stone band, and a plain parapet with stone coping.	II
Stabling, Aqualate Hall; 52.77461°N 2.33643°W	—	18th century	The stables are in red brick with a string course and tile roofs. They have two storeys, they form four ranges round a courtyard, and contain casement windows, some with leaded lights. The carriage enhance has a segmental head and a pediment, and on the roof is a cupola.	II
Sutton House; 52.79536°N 2.34837°W	—	18th century	A brick house with a string course, a modillion eaves cornice, and a tile roof. There are two storeys and four bays. The porch has Doric-style pillars, a curved front, and an iron rail parapet. To the right is a canted bay window, and the other windows are sashes.	II
Aqualate Castle; 52.77244°N 2.34619°W	—	Late 18th century (probable)	The building is in brick and has a tile roof with a stepped gable on the north side. There are three storeys and it contains round-headed windows. Attached to it is a round tower with two storeys, round-headed windows, and an embattled parapet.	II
Sutton Monument; 52.79205°N 2.35926°W		Late 18th century	Possibly a folly, possibly a ruined windmill, the structure is in stone. It has the shape of a cone, and contains square openings.	II
Cow house, Aqualate Hall; 52.77458°N 2.33544°W	—	c. 1800	The cowhouse is in red brick, and has a tile roof, hipped to the east. There are two storeys and three large internal bays. The cowhouse contains three doorways and seven square windows, four of which are blind, and pierced by lozenge-shaped ventilation panels.	II
Root store, Aqualate Hall; 52.77431°N 2.33499°W	—	Mid 19th century	The root store in the kitchen gardens is in red brick with a tile roof. The upper part is open, with five brick piers. The lower part is reached by a sunken passageway and contains four arched brick vaults.	II
Aqualate Hall; 52.77450°N 2.33709°W	—	1927–30	A country house designed by W. D. Caröe to replace a previous house of 1808 by John Nash, which was destroyed by fire, and incorporating parts of it. It is in red brick with a tile roof, and has a square plan with service wings. The main front faces north and contains two canted bay windows with balustraded parapets. The east entrance front has a two-storey polygonal porch with balustrades, and the archway has armorial shields. The other windows are steel-framed casements.	II*
