= Back Brook =

Back Brook may refer to:

- Back Brook, English Midlands
- Back Brook (New Jersey)
- Back Brook (Newfoundland)
