= Aqualate Mere =

Natural lake in Staffordshire, England

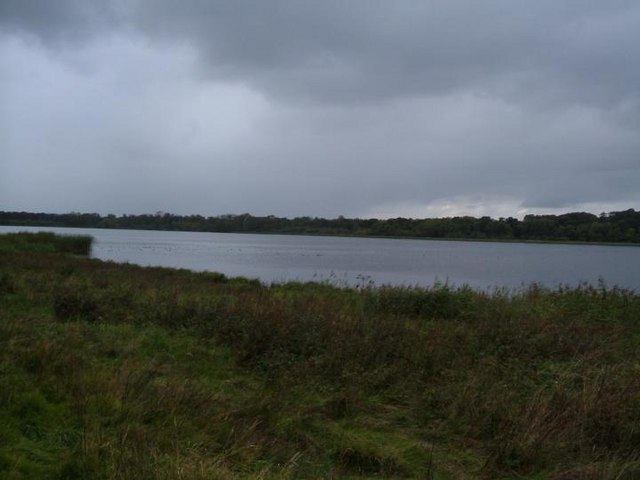
- (2004)

- Location within Staffordshire
- Location: Staffordshire, England
- Coordinates: 52.7812°N 2.3392°W
- Type: mere
- Basin countries: United Kingdom
- Settlements: Newport, Shropshire

Aqualate Mere is the largest natural mere in the English Midlands. The lake, which is located in Staffordshire, is a legacy of the Last Glacial Period that ended 10,000 years ago. It is managed as a National Nature Reserve (NNR) by Natural England.

== Etymology ==
Its name is derived from Anglo-Saxon Āc-gelād, meaning "oak grove" influenced by Latin "aqua" (water) "lata" (wide).

== Geography ==
The Mere lies within the borough of Stafford in Staffordshire, England, some 3 kilometres (1.9 mi) east of the market town of Newport, Shropshire. It is within the grounds of Aqualate Hall, a country house, with a landscaped deer park.

Although large in extent (1.5 mi (2.4 km) long by 0.5 mi (0.80 km) wide), the Mere is remarkably shallow and is not more than 1 m (3.3 ft) deep. Aqualate Mere is an example of an esker system (rare in the Midlands) formed by glacial meltwaters during the late Devensian glaciation. The depression in which the Mere lies, thought to be a kettle hole, and the surrounding higher ground which comprises glacial sand and gravel deposits were all formed at the same time.

It is fed by streams coming from the north, south and east (including Back Brook), and its outflow to the west forms the River Meese which joins the River Tern, a tributary of the River Severn.

== Wildlife ==
The NNR supports a variety of plants and vegetation, particularly its extensive wet meadows which are derived from ancient peat bogs. Species of interest include purple small-reed, meadow thistle, tubular water-dropwort and marsh St. John's-wort. It contains a sizeable heronry and many species of birds, and is considered notable for beetles, flies and moths.

Diverse fish and bird populations include large numbers of wintering and breeding wildfowl and breeding Eurasian curlew and common snipe. Together with the surrounding land, it is also important for its botanical and invertebrate communities. Mammals found on the NNR include polecat, water vole and harvest mouse, together with bats such as pipistrelle, Daubenton's, Natterer's, Brandt's and whiskered.
