= Henry Couchman =

Henry Couchman (8 January 1737 – 21 January 1803) was an English architect and landscape gardener. He designed the Old Drapers' Hall, Coventry (now demolished) and the House of Correction in Warwick. He helped complete Arbury Hall, Warwickshire, for Sir Roger Newdigate, including designing the magnificent saloon.

== Biography ==
Henry Couchman was born in Ightham, Kent. He was the eldest child of carpenter Henry Couchman and Sarah (née Luck). He was locally schooled.

Initially, he worked for his father, cutting timber and repairing buildings. Rather than continue in the carpentry trade Henry obtained a job in Greenhithe making drawings for a house builder. He then found work with a London builder. He later lost his job "in consequence of belonging to a club of workers in a plan to raise their wages".

Couchman eventually found work with a builder in Piccadilly. He became foreman of the woodwork, working on projects for Lord March (later Duke of Queensbury). He then moved to work for several years building Packington Hall, Warwickshire for the Lord Aylesford, arriving in 1766. While living in Warwickshire, he was also employed as County Bridgemaster where he designed Barford bridge (1792-1795), Ryton bridge (1786-1787) and Wixford bridge (1800-1801). He served on the committees of two canal companies, the Warwick & Birmingham Canal Company and the Warwick & Napton Canal Company.

He married Susanna Barnes in London in 1764. Their daughter Susanna married Thomas Wedge of Chester.

He died in 1803.
