= James Stewart (footballer, born 1883) =

English footballer

Personal information
- Full name: James Stewart
- Date of birth: 15 January 1883
- Place of birth: Newcastle-upon-Tyne, England
- Date of death: 17 February 1958 (aged 75)
- Place of death: Fenham, England
- Position: Inside forward

Youth career
- Todds Nook
- Gateshead N.E.R.

Senior career*
Years	Team	Apps	(Gls)
1902–1908	Sheffield Wednesday	123	(51)
1908–1913	Newcastle United	121	(49)
1913–1914	Rangers	19	(10)
- North Shields Athletic

International career
1907–1911	England	3	(2)

Managerial career
- North Shields Athletic
- * Club domestic league appearances and goals

James Stewart (15 January 1883 – 17 February 1958) was an English professional footballer who played as an inside forward and won the Football League championship with both Sheffield Wednesday and Newcastle United, as well as making three appearances for England.

== Club career ==
=== Early career ===
Born in Newcastle-upon-Tyne, he started his career with Todds Nook, and then Gateshead N.E.R., two local non-league sides where he first acquired his nickname, "Tadger", by which he was affectionately known throughout his career.

=== Sheffield Wednesday ===
In May 1902, he was snapped up by Sheffield Wednesday and made one appearance in their championship winning side of 1902–03. The following season he was a more regular selection, making ten appearances as Wednesday retained their title. In 1905–06 he was Wednesday's top scorer with a total of 22 goals (20 league and 2 cup).

The following season, he was part of the Wednesday team that reached the FA Cup Final against the previous year's winners, Everton. In the match at Crystal Palace Stadium on 20 April 1907 a mix-up in the Everton defence enabled Wednesday to take a twentieth-minute lead as Harry Chapman swung the ball into the goalmouth for Stewart to give it the final touch. Everton equalised through Jack Sharp in the closing minute of the first half, but with only four minutes of the match remaining, Andrew Wilson, the Wednesday centre-forward, received the ball from a throw-in and hooked it across the goalmouth for George Simpson, his outside-left, to head home one of the softest goals imaginable.

In August 1908, he moved back to Tyneside to join Newcastle United. During his six years at Wednesday he made a total of 141 appearances with 59 goals.

=== Newcastle United ===
At St James' Park he soon became one of the stars of "The Edwardian Masters", as Newcastle were known at the time due to the superb attacking, flowing and skilful way they played. He was an integral part of the team, alongside fellow internationals Colin Veitch, Jock Rutherford, Jimmy Lawrence and Albert Shepherd, which won the Football League championship in 1908–09, making 25 appearances and contributing eight goals.

In the FA Cup semi-final against Swindon Town on 26 March 1910, he scored the opening goal in a 2–0 victory but was unable to make the team for the final against Barnsley, which Newcastle won after a replay, thus taking the cup for the first time. In 1911, he played in the losing side in the final against Bradford City.

He continued to be a regular member of the Newcastle side, making a total of 138 appearances with 53 goals, until he was sold to Rangers in 1913 for £600. He spent one season in Scotland but was unable to claim any medals to add to his collection; Rangers finished second in the 1913–14 Scottish Division One table behind Celtic and were eliminated in an early round of the Scottish Cup by Hibernian.

=== Later career ===
In May 1914 he returned to his native north-east, and non-League football, with North Shields Athletic where he became team manager. He was then living in Gateshead, and working as a commercial traveller. He served in the Royal Garrison Artillery during the First World War.

== International career ==
Stewart made his first appearance for England against Wales on 18 March 1907, scoring England's goal in a 1–1 draw. His next England appearance, against Scotland on 6 April also ended with the same result. He made his third, and final, England appearance against Scotland on 1 April 1911 and again scored in a 1–1 draw. All three of his international appearances thus ended 1–1.

== Honours ==
Sheffield Wednesday

- Football League championship: 1903–04
- FA Cup winner: 1907

Newcastle United

- Football League championship: 1908–09
- FA Cup finalist: 1911
