= West Bromwich Albion F.C. in European football =

English club in European football

- Club: West Bromwich Albion
- Seasons played: 5
- Most appearances: Brendon Batson (12); Tony Godden (12); Ally Robertson (12); Bryan Robson (12); Derek Statham (12); John Wile (12)
- Top scorer: Tony Brown (8)
- First entry: 1966–67 Inter-Cities Fairs Cup
- Latest entry: 1981–82 UEFA Cup

West Bromwich Albion Football Club is an English football club based in West Bromwich, West Midlands. The club was founded in 1878 and has competed in the English football league system from its conception in 1888. Since their first qualification to major European cup competition in 1966, they have participated in the Inter-Cities Fairs Cup, the European Cup Winners' Cup, the UEFA Cup, the Texaco Cup, the Anglo-Italian Cup, the Anglo-Scottish Cup, as well as winning the Tennent Caledonian Cup. However, they have not competed in European cup competition since 1996, and not partaken in UEFA-sanctioned European cup competition since 1981.

== Major European competitions ==
=== 1966–67 Inter-Cities Fairs Cup ===
The Baggies first season in European competition was in the Inter-Cities Fairs Cup in the 1966–67 tournament, after finishing in sixth position in the First Division the season before. Their first opponents were DOS Utrecht. After a 1–1 draw in the Netherlands, Albion ran riot with a 5–2 win at home. Next, they faced Bologna, who beat them 6–1 on aggregate to end their campaign.

Season	Competition	Round	Opposition	Score
1966–67	Inter-Cities Fairs Cup	Second round	(Netherlands) DOS Utrecht	1–1 (A), 5–2 (H)
1966–67	Inter-Cities Fairs Cup	Third round	(Italy) Bologna	0–3 (A), 1–3 (H)

=== 1968–69 European Cup Winners' Cup ===
Albion won the FA Cup in 1967–68, by beating Everton in the Final, which secured their maiden European Cup Winners' Cup campaign. Their first round opponents were Club Brugge. In the first leg, Brugge won 3–1, however the Baggies won 2–0 at home – enough to see the English club through thanks to the away goals rule. Against Dinamo București in the second round, the first leg finished 1–1, but WBA won the second leg 4–0. In the quarter-final against Dunfermline Athletic, the first leg finished scoreless. The second leg was a 1–0 win for Dunfermline, the winning goal scored by Pat Gardner.

Season	Competition	Round	Opposition	Score
1968–69	European Cup Winners' Cup	First round	(Belgium) Club Brugge	1–3 (A), 2–0 (H) (Note: Won on the away goals rule)
1968–69	European Cup Winners' Cup	Second round	(Romania) Dinamo București	1–1 (A), 4–0 (H)
1968–69	European Cup Winners' Cup	Quarter-finals	(Scotland) Dunfermline Athletic	0–0 (A), 0–1 (H)

=== 1978–79 UEFA Cup ===
A finish of sixth in the 1977–78 season saw the Baggies qualify for the UEFA Cup for the first time in 1978–79. The other English clubs to compete were Arsenal, Everton and Manchester City. In the first round, WBA faced Turkish side Galatasaray. Two 3–1 wins in each leg put Albion through to face Braga in the second round. Wins both home and away saw the Baggies progress to the third round. Spanish club Valencia CF were the opposition, and a 1–1 draw at their Mestalla Stadium followed by a 2–0 home win saw them safely through. In the quarter-finals Red Star Belgrade won the first leg by one goal to nil, and WBA could only muster a 1–1 draw, ending their tournament.

Season	Competition	Round	Opposition	Score
1978–79	UEFA Cup	First round	(Turkey) Galatasaray	1–3 (A), 3–1 (H)
1978–79	UEFA Cup	Second round	(Portugal) Braga	0–2 (A), 1–0 (H)
1978–79	UEFA Cup	Third round	(Spain) Valencia	1–1 (A), 2–0 (H)
1978–79	UEFA Cup	Quarter-finals	(Socialist Federal Republic of Yugoslavia) Red Star Belgrade	1–0 (A), 1–1 (H)

=== 1979–80 UEFA Cup ===
A finish of third in the 1978–79 season earned the Baggies a second consecutive UEFA Cup campaign. English clubs Everton, Ipswich Town and Leeds United also qualified for the 1979–80 tournament. WBA were faced with FC Carl Zeiss Jena, and the East Germans eliminated Albion with victories at home and away.

Season	Competition	Round	Opposition	Score
1979–80	UEFA Cup	First round	(East Germany) FC Carl Zeiss Jena	0–2 (A), 1–2 (H)

=== 1981–82 UEFA Cup ===
A finish of fourth in the 1980–81 season earned the Baggies a third UEFA Cup campaign in four seasons. English clubs Arsenal, Ipswich and Southampton also qualified for the 1981–82 tournament. Just as in the preceding season, Albion's European adventure would last just one round – this time it was Swiss side Grasshoppers who put Albion out by beating them home and away.

Season	Competition	Round	Opposition	Score
1981–82	UEFA Cup	First round	(Switzerland) Grasshoppers	0–1 (A), 1–3 (H)

== Overall record ==
=== Record by competition ===
Competition	Pld	W	D	L	GF	GA	GD	Best performance
Inter-Cities Fairs Cup	4	1	1	2	7	9	-2	Third round (1966–67)
UEFA Cup	12	5	2	5	15	13	+2	Quarter-final (1978–79)
European Cup Winners' Cup	6	2	2	2	8	5	+3	Quarter-final (1968–69)

=== Record by nation ===
Nation	Pld	W	D	L	GF	GA	GD	Opponents
Belgium	2	1	0	1	3	3	0	Club Brugge
East Germany	2	0	0	2	1	3	-3	Carl Zeiss Jena
Italy	2	0	0	2	1	6	-5	Bologna
Netherlands	2	1	1	0	6	3	+3	DOS Utrecht
Portugal	2	2	0	0	3	0	+3	Braga
Romania	2	1	1	0	5	1	+4	Dinamo București
Scotland	2	0	1	1	0	1	-1	Dunfermline Athletic
Spain	2	1	1	0	3	1	+2	Valencia
Switzerland	2	0	0	2	1	4	-3	Grasshoppers
Turkey	2	2	0	0	6	2	+4	Galatasaray
Yugoslavia	2	0	1	1	1	2	-1	Red Star Belgrade

== Other competitions ==
=== 1970 Anglo-Italian Cup ===
WBA entered the inaugural Anglo-Italian Cup in 1970 and for the group stage, were placed in Group 2, with Lanerossi, Middlesbrough and Roma. Each club would face the clubs from the other country in their group home and away, and the English and Italian club with the best record in the tournament out of the three groups would play each other in the Final. WBA finished fourth in the English table.

Season	Competition	Round	Opposition	Score
1970	Anglo-Italian Cup	Group stage	(Italy) Lanerossi	0–0 (H)
1970	Anglo-Italian Cup	Group stage	(Italy) Roma	4–0 (H)
1970	Anglo-Italian Cup	Group stage	(Italy) Lanerossi	a–a (A) (Note: The match was abandoned after 75 minutes with Vicenza leading 1–0. The result was awarded as a 2–0 loss against both teams.)
1970	Anglo-Italian Cup	Group stage	(Italy) Roma	1–1 (A)

=== 1970–71 Texaco Cup ===
The Baggies first Texaco Cup campaign came in the 1970–71 season, however it would be a very brief interlude, as Morton eliminated them in the first round. In the first leg, Morton came from behind to win 2–1. In the second leg at the Hawthorns, Morton won 1–0, and WBA were out.

Season	Competition	Round	Opposition	Score
1970–71	Texaco Cup	First round	(Scotland) Morton	2–1 (A), 0–1 (H)

=== 1971 Anglo-Italian Cup ===
In the group stage of the 1971 Anglo-Italian Cup, WBA were placed in Group 2, with Cagliari, Crystal Palace and Inter Milan. Having drawn the first game 1–1 against Inter, Albion lost the remaining three games, leaving them rooted to the bottom of the table. Due to lack of interest the tournament ceased after the 1973 edition.

Season	Competition	Round	Opposition	Score
1971	Anglo-Italian Cup	Group stage	(Italy) Inter Milan	1–1 (H)
1971	Anglo-Italian Cup	Group stage	(Italy) Cagliari	1–2 (H)
1971	Anglo-Italian Cup	Group stage	(Italy) Inter Milan	1–0 (A)
1971	Anglo-Italian Cup	Group stage	(Italy) Cagliari	1–0 (A)

=== 1972–73 Texaco Cup ===
The Throstles fared slightly better in their second try at the Texaco Cup. Faced with Sheffield United in the first round, the first leg finished 1–1. A 1–0 win was enough to safely progress to the second round where Newcastle United awaited. A 2–1 win in the first leg looked promising, but the Magpies won the second leg 3–1, ending the West Midland club's hopes.

Season	Competition	Round	Opposition	Score
1972–73	Texaco Cup	First round	(England) Sheffield United	1–1 (A), 1–0 (H)
1972–73	Texaco Cup	Second round	(England) Newcastle United	2–1 (H), 3–1 (A)

=== 1974–75 Texaco Cup ===
The Texaco Cup format was changed in the 1974–75 season. Group stages were introduced for the English clubs. Each team would play the others in the group once, with only the team finishing top of the group progressing. The four Scottish clubs would join in at the quarter-final stage. WBA were in Group 1, with Birmingham City, Norwich City and Peterborough United. After a no-score draw at home to Birmingham, Albion beat Norwich 5–1. However, a 2–1 loss at Peterborough meant that Albion finished second of their group, and left the competition at the group stage.

Season	Competition	Round	Opposition	Score
1974–75	Texaco Cup	First round	(England) Birmingham City	0–0 (H)
1974–75	Texaco Cup	First round	(England) Norwich City	5–1 (H)
1974–75	Texaco Cup	First round	(England) Peterborough United	2–1 (A)

=== 1975–76 Anglo-Scottish Cup ===
After Texaco dropped their sponsorship of the tournament, the Anglo-Scottish Cup was created in the 1975–76 season, using largely the same format as the Texaco Cup the previous year, but with the introduction of a Scottish Qualifier round to select four from eight teams for the quarter-final stage. Albion were in Group 2 of the English Qualifiers, with Hull City, Leicester City and Mansfield Town. Albion first drew 1–1 with Mansfield, before beating Hull 2–1. However, losing by the same scoreline to Leicester meant that WBA did not progress, again finishing second in the group, this time behind Mansfield.

Season	Competition	Round	Opposition	Score
1975–76	Anglo-Scottish Cup	First round	(England) Mansfield Town	1–1 (H)
1975–76	Anglo-Scottish Cup	First round	(England) Hull City	1–2 (A)
1975–76	Anglo-Scottish Cup	First round	(England) Leicester City	2–1 (A)

=== 1976–77 Anglo-Scottish Cup ===
In the 1976–77 season of the Anglo-Scottish Cup Albion were placed in Group 2, with Bristol City, and Nottingham clubs Forest and Notts County. Losses to Bristol City and Forest were followed by a 3–1 win over County. WBA finished third, the team to progress from Group 2 was Forest, and the Reds went on to win the tournament.

Season	Competition	Round	Opposition	Score
1976–77	Anglo-Scottish Cup	First round	(England) Bristol City	1–0 (A)
1976–77	Anglo-Scottish Cup	First round	(England) Nottingham Forest	3–2 (A)
1976–77	Anglo-Scottish Cup	First round	(England) Notts County	3–1 (H)

=== 1977 Tennent Caledonian Cup ===
On the weekend on 6 and 7 August 1977, Rangers held the 1977 edition of an invitational tournament at their Ibrox home stadium called the Tennent Caledonian Cup. As well as Rangers, the teams to take part were St Mirren, Southampton and WBA. In the semi-final against St Mirren, the Baggies won 4–3. In the final, Albion won 2–0, with both goals coming from Laurie Cunningham.

Season	Competition	Round	Opposition	Score
1977	Tennent Caledonian Cup	Semi-final	(Scotland) St Mirren	3–4 (N)
1977	Tennent Caledonian Cup	Final	(Scotland) Rangers	0–2 (A)

=== 1982 Ciutat de Barcelona Trophy ===
On 17 and 18 August 1982, RCD Espanyol held the 1982 edition of an invitational tournament at their Estadi Olímpic Lluís Companys home stadium called the Ciutat de Barcelona Trophy. As well as the home team, the teams to take part were CA Osasuna, FC Spartak Moscow and WBA. Albion faced the home team in the semifinal, and lost 3–2; Cyrille Regis and Martin Jol were the goalscorers for the Baggies. In the third place play-off match Cyrille Regis opened the scoring however Osasuna won 2–1. The team from the Soviet Union were the eventual victors, beating Espanyol 3–1.

Season	Competition	Round	Opposition	Score
1982	Ciutat de Barcelona Trophy	Semi-final	(Spain) RCD Espanyol	3–2 (A)
1982	Ciutat de Barcelona Trophy	Third Place Match	(Spain) CA Osasuna	2–1 (N)

=== 1993–94 Anglo-Italian Cup ===
Albion's first entry to the Anglo-Italian Cup since the revival of the competition in 1992 came in the 1993–94 tournament. In the preliminary round, they were placed in Group 4 with Leicester City and Peterborough United. A scoreless draw with Leicester and a 3–1 win over Peterborough saw WBA progress to the group stage. In the group stage, the Baggies were in Group 2, with English teams Portsmouth, Stoke City, and Southend United, and Italian clubs Cosenza, Fiorentina, Padova and Pescara. Albion finished bottom of the table, not picking up a single point in the process.

Season	Competition	Round	Opposition	Score
1993–94	Anglo-Italian Cup	Preliminary round	(England) Leicester City	0–0 (A)
1993–94	Anglo-Italian Cup	Preliminary round	(England) Peterborough United	3–1 (H)
1993–94	Anglo-Italian Cup	Group stage	(Italy) Pescara	1–2 (H)
1993–94	Anglo-Italian Cup	Group stage	(Italy) Padova	3–4 (H)
1993–94	Anglo-Italian Cup	Group stage	(Italy) Fiorentina	2–0 (A)
1993–94	Anglo-Italian Cup	Group stage	(Italy) Cosenza	2–1 (A)

=== 1995–96 Anglo-Italian Cup ===
In the 1995–96 Anglo-Italian Cup, Albion were put into Group 2, with English clubs Ipswich Town, Stoke City, Southend United and Italian teams Brescia, Foggia, Reggiana and Salernitana. With two wins, one draw and one loss, Albion progressed to the English semi-final, where Birmingham City awaited. After a 2–2 draw, Albion triumphed on penalties to go through to the English final. Port Vale were the opposition, and the first leg finished goalless. The second leg finished 3–1 to Vale, and they went through. The tournament itself was scrapped after this tournament because the two leagues could not agree on dates for fixtures, and due to increasing violence at matches.

Season	Competition	Round	Opposition	Score
1995–96	Anglo-Italian Cup	Group stage	(Italy) Salernitana	0–0 (A)
1995–96	Anglo-Italian Cup	Group stage	(Italy) Foggia	1–2 (H)
1995–96	Anglo-Italian Cup	Group stage	(Italy) Reggiana	2–1 (H)
1995–96	Anglo-Italian Cup	Group stage	(Italy) Brescia	0–1 (A)
1995–96	Anglo-Italian Cup	English semi-final	(England) Birmingham City	2–2 (A) (Note: Won 4–1 on penalties)
1995–96	Anglo-Italian Cup	English final	(England) Port Vale	0–0 (H), 3–1 (A)

=== Record ===
Competition	Pld	W	D	L	GF	GA	GD
Anglo-Italian Cup	21	3	8	10	17	24	-7
Texaco Cup	9	3	2	4	14	13	+1
Anglo-Scottish Cup	6	2	1	3	9	9	0
Tennent Caledonian Cup	2	2	0	0	6	3	+3
Ciutat de Barcelona Trophy	2	0	0	2	3	5	-2
