= Richard Wadge =

English football manager

Richard Henry Wadge (1864–1923) was an English football director of Burnley. Following the death of Burnley manager Spen Whittaker in 1910, Wadge temporarily assumed the club's secretarial duties. Born in Liskeard, Cornwall, in 1864, Wadge died in London in 1923, at the age of 59.
