= Nat Whittaker =

English footballer, referee, secretary, and manager

Personal information
- Date of birth: 3 February 1863
- Place of birth: Church, England
- Date of death: 1922 (aged 58–59)
- Place of death: London, England
- Position: Half back

Senior career*
Years	Team	Apps	(Gls)
- Accrington
- Tottenham Hotspur

Managerial career
- 1909–1910: Croydon Common
- * Club domestic league appearances and goals

Nathan Whittaker (3 February 1863 — 1922) was an English professional footballer, referee, secretary and manager.

== Playing career ==
Whittaker played for local club Accrington in the Football League, before moving to London for a teaching role. Whilst in London, Whittaker played for Tottenham Hotspur.

== Refereeing and secretarial career ==
Following his playing career, Whittaker moved into a secretarial role in football, sitting on the councils for The Football Association, the Referees' Association, the London Football Association and the Southern Football League.

Alongside his secretarial commitments, Whittaker was also a referee, refereeing games in the Football League and the Southern League. The biggest distinction in Whittaker's career came on 20 April 1907, when he refereed in the 1907 FA Cup Final, in a game that saw "fouls rather plentiful".

== Managerial career ==
On 25 April 1907, Whittaker was present at a public meeting in which it was decided for Croydon Common to become a professional club. In December 1909, Whittaker was appointed manager of Croydon Common. In February 1910, Whittaker was replaced as manager by Dave Gardner.

== Personal life ==
Whittaker's brother, Spen, was also a footballer, later managing Burnley until his death in 1910.
