= Forton, Staffordshire =

Village and civil parish in Staffordshire, England

Coordinates: 52.788°N 2.367°W

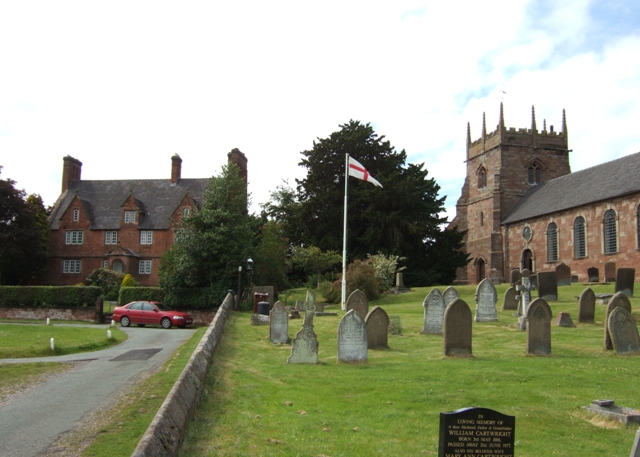
The Hall beside the All Saints church

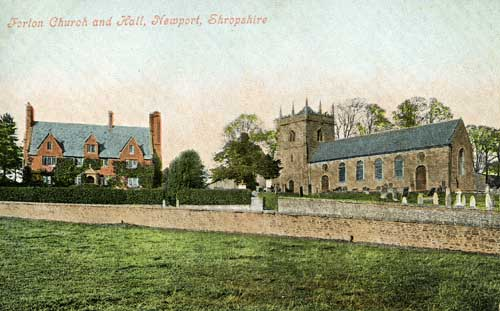
Postcard picture Forton Hall and All Saints church.

Forton is a small village and civil parish in Staffordshire, England, situated east of the market town of Newport, Shropshire. The civil Parish population at the 2011 census was 308.

It is situated around Forton Hall and the 14th century All Saints church, and is sited on the Roman road Via Devana and the modern A519 road between Newport and Newcastle-under-Lyme.

Forton Hall was built by Edwin Skrymsher of Norbury Manor, Eccleshall, at the end of the 17th century and is situated adjacent to the church of All Saints. In 1729 five new bells were given to the church. The most prominent monument is the alabaster tomb of Thomas Skrymsher (died 1633), knight of Aqualate and his family.

There is a pub called The Swan.

== Notable people ==
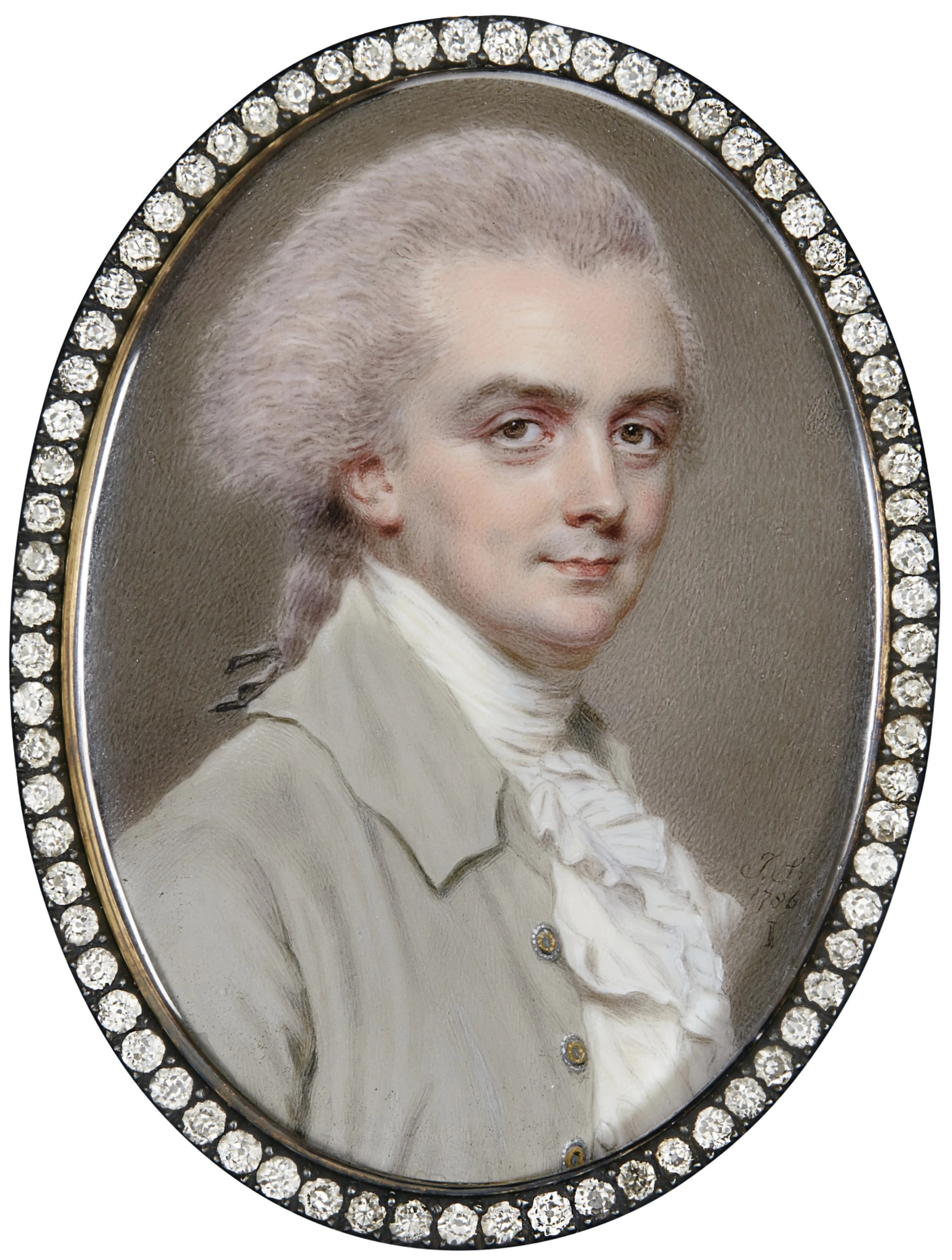
Sir Charles Oakeley, 1st Baronet, 1786

- Samuel Dugard (1645?–1697 in Forton) a divine and rector of Forton, died locally.
- John Wedge (1744 in Forton – 1816) an agriculturalist and surveyor, owned various properties including a brass factory in Birmingham
- Charles Wedge (1746 in Aqualate Park – 1842) a farmer who practised as a surveyor and assisted in the construction of canals.
- Sir Charles Oakeley, 1st Baronet (1751 in Forton – 1826) an administrator in India
- Thomas Wedge (1760 in Forton – 1854) an agriculturalist

== See also ==
- Listed buildings in Forton, Staffordshire
