= 1907 FA Cup final =

- The Wednesday's winning squad
- Event: 1906–07 FA Cup
The Wednesday	Everton
2	1
- Date: 20 April 1907
- Venue: Crystal Palace, London
- Referee: N. Whittaker
- Attendance: 84,584

The 1907 FA Cup final was contested by The Wednesday and Everton at Crystal Palace. Sheffield Wednesday won 2–1, with goals by Jimmy Stewart and George Simpson.

This was the second time that the previous winner had reached the final and failed to win it, the first time being in 1883 when Old Etonians lost to Blackburn Olympic.

== Match details ==
20 April 1907
15:00 GMT

The Wednesday	2–1	Everton
Stewart 20'; Simpson 86'		Sharp 45'

Crystal Palace, London
Attendance: 84,584
Referee: N. Whittaker

The Wednesday	Everton

(England) Jack Lyall
(England) Billy Layton
(England) Harry Burton
(England) Tom Brittleton
(England) Tommy Crawshaw (c)
(England) Bill Bartlett
(England) Harry Chapman
(England) Frank Bradshaw
(Scotland) Andrew Wilson
(England) James Stewart
(England) George Simpson
Manager:
(England) Arthur Dickinson

(Ireland) Billy Scott
(England) Walter Balmer
(England) Bob Balmer
(England) Harry Makepeace
(Scotland) Jack Taylor (c)
(England) Walter Abbott
(England) Jack Sharp
(Scotland) Hugh Bolton
(Scotland) Alex "Sandy" Young
(England) Jimmy Settle
(England) Harold Hardman
Manager:
(England) William C. Cuff

Match rules

- 90 minutes
- 30 minutes of extra-time if necessary
- Replay if scores still level

== Road to the Final ==
Sheffield Wednesday
Home teams listed first.

Round 1: The Wednesday 3–2 Wolverhampton Wanderers

Round 2: Southampton 1–1 The Wednesday

Replay: The Wednesday 3–1 Southampton

Round 3: The Wednesday 0–0 Sunderland

Replay: Sunderland 0–1 The Wednesday

Round 4: The Wednesday 1–0 Liverpool

Semi-final: Arsenal 1–3 The Wednesday

Everton
Home teams listed first. Round 1: Everton 1–0 Sheffield United

Round 2: West Ham United 1–2 Everton

Round 3: Everton 0–0 Bolton Wanderers

Replay: Bolton 0–3 Everton

Round 4: Crystal Palace 1–1 Everton

Replay: Everton 4–0 Crystal Palace

Semi-final: West Bromwich Albion 1–2 Everton
