= Charles Wedge of Shudy Camps =

Charles Wedge (1746–1842), English farmer and surveyor, was the son of Sir Francis Wedge of Aqualate Park at Forton, Staffordshire, and the brother of John Wedge and Thomas Wedge. In 1776 he married Elizabeth Fletcher, at St Mary Woolnoth, London. They had seven surviving children. The second son was John Helder Wedge (1793–1872), emigrant to Tasmania.

Charles Wedge practised as a surveyor and assisted John Rennie in the construction of canals. He was often appointed a Commissioner of the Inclosures and also practised modern agricultural techniques on his farms at Little Wilbraham and Shudy Camps, in Cambridgeshire.

Charles Wedge died in 1842, aged 96 years. He is buried with his wife at St Mary's Church, Shudy Camps.
