= Back Brook, English Midlands =

Watercourse in Shropshire and Staffordshire, England

Coordinates: 52.7777°N 2.3290°W

The Back Brook is a minor watercourse in the English counties of Shropshire and Staffordshire, in places forming the boundary between the two, and located generally to the east/southeast of the town of Newport. It flows into Aqualate Mere.
