= John Wedge =

English agriculturalist (1744–1816)

John Wedge (10 December 1744 – 19 March 1816) was an English agriculturalist.

== Life ==
John Wedge was the son of Francis Wedge (1714–1784) and Elizabeth Knock (1713–1788) of Fernhill House, near Forton, Staffordshire, a prosperous farmer, and brother of Thomas Wedge of Chester and Charles Wedge of Shudy Camps. He established himself on the Church Farm, Bickenhill, in Warwickshire.

Wedge was agent to the Earl of Aylesford, whose seat at Packington House was close by, and a friend of Rev John Jaques, the Rector of Bickenhill and Prebendary of Lincoln Cathedral, who left his estate to Wedge. He was churchwarden at Little Packington, one of the livings held by Jaques.

Wedge owned various properties and prospered from agriculture, as well as taking up surveying (he helped survey the Grand Canal) and he also owned a brass factory in Birmingham. His description of land drainage works on the Earl of Aylesford's estate at Bickenhill won the Silver Medal of the Society of Arts in 1792. In 1794, he wrote A General View of the Agriculture of the County of Warwick (London, 1794) for the Board of Agriculture and Internal Improvement.

Wedge died 19 March 1816 and was buried in the graveyard of St Bartholomew's, Little Packington with his wife and son William, both of whom predeceased him in March 1803. He was survived by his sons John (1795–1836), Francis (1796–1873), Thomas (born 1798) and Charles (1802–1858).

== Family ==
On 23 May 1793 John Wedge married Sarah Bennett (born September 1760), the daughter of Thomas Bennett, solicitor of Coventry. Their second child, John Jaques Wedge (1795–1836), was born February 1795 and was educated at St John's College, Cambridge. He afterwards entered the Church of England, as did his son also called John Jaques Wedge (1821–1873).
