= Albert Pickles (footballer, born 1905) =

English footballer

Personal information
- Date of birth: 1905
- Place of birth: Leeds, England
- Position: Outside right

Senior career*
Years	Team	Apps	(Gls)
- Castleford Town
1927	Bradford City	2	(0)
Total		2	(0)
- * Club domestic league appearances and goals

Albert Pickles (born 1905) was an English professional footballer who played as an outside right.

== Career ==
Born in Leeds, Pickles joined Bradford City from Castleford Town in March 1927. He made 2 league appearances for the club, before being released later in 1927.

== Sources ==
- Frost, Terry (1988). Bradford City A Complete Record 1903-1988. Breedon Books Sport. ISBN 0-907969-38-0.
