= Ciutat de Barcelona Trophy =

Football tournament held in Spain

Ciutat de Barcelona Trophy (Catalan: Trofeu Ciutat de Barcelona) is a summer tournament organized by RCD Espanyol in Barcelona. Initially there used to be four participating teams, but in more recent times it was a two-team tournament. Teams are usually club-level, but in 1981 the Honduras national football team participated, and finished last in the tournament. The 1980 final is the only one in which Espanyol did not play, while in 2009 the match was officially advertised as the opening of the new RCDE Stadium rather than the Ciutat event. The current holders of the trophy are the hosts Espanyol after a 1–1 (5–4 p) victory against Betis. The fixture has not been played since 2015, with no explanation given for its de facto discontinuation.

== Titles ==
Note that only the winner and the runner-up are shown here. From 1974 to 1982 four teams participated in the competition, while a three-team edition was played in 1995.

Year	Winner	Runner-up	Score
1974	(Czechoslovakia) Slovan Bratislava	(Spain) Español	4–1
1975	(Spain) Español	(Argentina) Estudiantes	2–0
1976	(Soviet Union) Dynamo Moscow	(Spain) Español	1–0
1977	(Spain) Español	(Austria) Rapid Wien	5–0
1978	(Spain) Español	(Romania) Universitatea Craiova	3–2
1979	(Spain) Español	(Spain) Valencia	0–0 (3–1 p)
1980	(Spain) Zaragoza	(Mexico) Cruz Azul	3–0
1981	(Spain) Español	(Mexico) Puebla	4–1
1982	(Soviet Union) Spartak Moscow	(Spain) Español	3–1
1983	(Spain) Real Madrid	(Spain) Español	5–1
1984	(Spain) Español	(Spain) Real Madrid	1–0
1985	(Spain) Real Madrid	(Spain) Español	5–3
1986	(Spain) Español	(Spain) Real Madrid	2–2 (4–3 p)
1987	(Spain) Español	(West Germany) Stuttgart	2–2 (5–4 p)
1988	(Spain) Real Madrid	(Spain) Español	1–0
1989	(Spain) Barcelona	(Spain) Español	2–1
1990	(Spain) Español	(Spain) Real Madrid	2–2 (4–3 p)
1991	(Brazil) São Paulo	(Spain) Español	4–2
1992	(Brazil) São Paulo	(Spain) Español	2–1
1993	(Brazil) Vasco da Gama	(Spain) Español	3–1
1994	(Italy) Milan	(Spain) Español	3–0
1995	(Spain) Valencia	(Spain) Espanyol	1–0
1996	(Spain) Espanyol	(Spain) Real Madrid	2–1
1997	(Spain) Espanyol	(Italy) Milan	2–2 (6–5 p)
1998	(Spain) Espanyol	(Spain) Atlético de Madrid	0–0 (5–4 p)
1999	(Italy) Udinese	(Spain) Espanyol	1–1 (3–0 p)
2000	(Spain) Espanyol	(England) Newcastle United	2–1
2001	(Spain) Espanyol	(Greece) Olympiacos	3–0
2002	(Italy) Chievo Verona	(Spain) Espanyol	0–0 (5–3 p)
2003	(Italy) Parma	(Spain) Espanyol	1–1 (4–3 p)
2004	(Spain) Espanyol	(Italy) Udinese	2–0
2005	(France) Olympique de Marseille	(Spain) Espanyol	2–1
2006	(Spain) Espanyol	(Italy) Lazio	2–0
2007	(Spain) Espanyol	(Greece) Olympiacos	3–2
2008	(Spain) Espanyol	(Italy) Udinese	1–0
2009	(Spain) Espanyol	(England) Liverpool	3–0
2010	(Spain) Espanyol	(Italy) Sampdoria	0–0 (6–5 p)
2011	(Spain) Espanyol	(Argentina) Boca Juniors	3–1
2012	(Spain) Espanyol	(France) Montpellier	2–0
2013	(England) West Ham United	(Spain) Espanyol	1–0
2014	(Spain) Espanyol	(Italy) Genoa	1–1 (5–4 p)
2015	(Spain) Espanyol	(Spain) Betis	1–1 (5–4 p)

== Performance by club ==
Club	Winner	Runner-up
(Spain) RCD Espanyol	24	17
(Spain) Real Madrid	3	4
(Brazil) São Paulo	2	-
(Italy) Udinese	1	2
(Italy) Milan	1	1
(Spain) Valencia	1	1
(Czechoslovakia) Slovan Bratislava	1	-
(Soviet Union) Dynamo Moscow	1	-
(Spain) Zaragoza	1	-
(Soviet Union) Spartak Moscow	1	-
(Spain) Barcelona	1	-
(Brazil) Vasco da Gama	1	-
(Italy) Chievo Verona	1	-
(Italy) Parma	1	-
(France) Olympique de Marseille	1	-
(England) West Ham United	1	-
(Greece) Olympiacos	-	2
(Argentina) Estudiantes	-	1
(Austria) Rapid Wien	-	1
(Romania) Universitatea Craiova	-	1
(Mexico) Cruz Azul	-	1
(Mexico) Puebla	-	1
(West Germany) Stuttgart	-	1
(Spain) Atlético de Madrid	-	1
(England) Newcastle United	-	1
(Italy) Lazio	-	1
(England) Liverpool	-	1
(Italy) Sampdoria	-	1
(Argentina) Boca Juniors	-	1
(France) Montpellier	-	1
(Italy) Genoa	-	1
(Spain) Betis	-	1
