= George Simpson (footballer, born 1883) =

English footballer

Personal information
- Full name: George Simpson
- Date of birth: 1883
- Place of birth: Jarrow, England
- Position: Outside left

Senior career*
Years	Team	Apps	(Gls)
- Jarrow
1903–1909	The Wednesday	140	(29)
1909–1911	West Bromwich Albion	19	(5)
1911–1913	North Shields		
- * Club domestic league appearances and goals

George Simpson (1883 - unknown) was an English professional footballer, who played for The Wednesday and West Bromwich Albion.

With Wednesday he won the Football League championship in 1903–04 and the FA Cup in 1907, scoring the winning goal in the final.
