= Spen Whittaker =

English football manager

Personal information
- Date of birth: February 1871
- Place of birth: Oswaldtwistle, England
- Date of death: 16 April 1910 (aged 39)
- Place of death: Crewe, England

Senior career*
Years	Team	Apps	(Gls)
- Oswaldtwistle Rovers

Managerial career
- 1903–1910: Burnley
- * Club domestic league appearances and goals

Spencer Whittaker (February 1871 – 16 April 1910) was an English footballer, manager and secretary.

== Playing career ==
Whittaker played for hometown club Oswaldtwistle Rovers, before retiring from playing, taking up the chairman and secretary role at the club.

== Managerial career ==
Whittaker was appointed manager of Burnley in 1903. His reign as Burnley manager was to come to a tragic end in April 1910. Whittaker was on his way to London by train to register the signing of a new player. When the train stopped in Crewe, it was reported that a man had fallen from a carriage some distance outside the town. When the body was discovered it was found to be that of Whittaker. The fall resulted in the death of the Burnley manager, and a benefit match against Manchester United at Turf Moor was arranged for Whittaker's wife and family.

== Personal life ==
Whittaker's brother, Nat, was a professional footballer, manager, secretary and referee, refereeing the 1907 FA Cup Final.
