= Forton Hall =

17th-century house in Forton, Staffordshire

Coordinates: 52.7875°N 2.3649°W

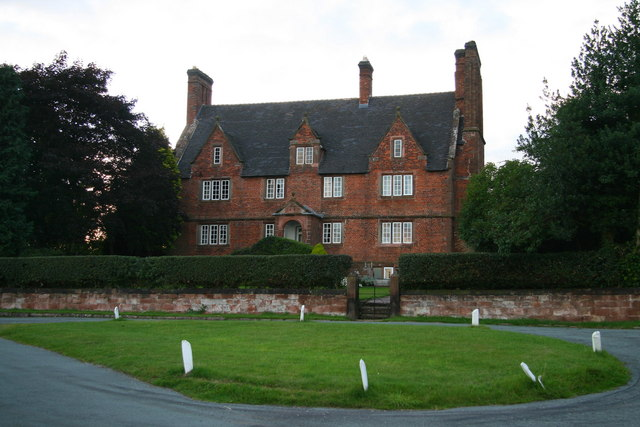
Forton Hall

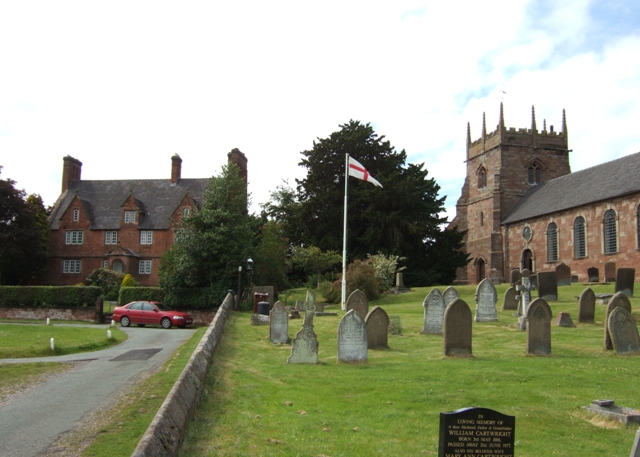
The Hall beside the All Saints church

Forton Hall is a 17th-century country house situated in the village of Forton, Staffordshire, close to the Shropshire border at Newport. It is a Grade II* listed building.

It was built by Edwin Skrymsher of Norbury Manor, Eccleshall, in the mid-17th century. The porch carries a datestone bearing the date 1665. Skrymsher also re-built Aqualate Hall nearby later in the 17th century.

The Hall is positioned next to the then Roman road that headed to Eccleshall called the Via Devana and adjacent to Forton church, which has a Saxon font.

The monument outside the Hall is the alabaster tomb of Sir Thomas Skrymsher Kt. of Aqualate ( d 1633) and his wife, Anne (d 1656) (ancestors of Edwin) who lived at Aqualate Hall.
