= George Wedge =

American music writer (1890–1964)

George Anson Wedge (1890–1964) was an American music writer who served as the dean of Juilliard School of Music between 1939 and 1946.

== Early life and career ==
Wedge received his education from Juilliard School of Music where he received diplomas in organ and piano. He was also given an honorary doctorate degree from Ursinus College, Pennsylvania.

In November 1964, he died at the age of 74.

During his career, he taught at New York University from 1920 to 1927 and the Curtis Institute of Music from 1924 to 1926.

== Publications ==
- Advanced ear-training and sight-singing as applied to the study of harmony: a continuation of the practical and coordinated course for schools and private study
- Ear training and sight singing
- Applied harmony in 2 vol.
- The Gist of Music
