= Albert Pickles (footballer, born 1877) =

English footballer (1877–1958)

Personal information
- Date of birth: 1877
- Place of birth: Burnley, England
- Date of death: 12 September 1958 (aged 80–81)
- Place of death: Read, England

Senior career*
Years	Team	Apps	(Gls)
- Burnley Belvedere

Managerial career
- 1925–1932: Burnley
- * Club domestic league appearances and goals

Albert Pickles (1877 – 12 September 1958) was an English football player and manager. Born in Burnley, Lancashire he was an outstanding athlete in his school days and went on to play amateur football for Burnley Belvedere. In 1894, at the age of 17, he was invited to a trial with Aston Villa, but his parents would not give him permission to pursue a career in professional football. In 1918, he joined the Burnley board of directors. In January 1925, the club looked within the club to appoint a new manager following the death of former boss John Haworth in December 1924, and Pickles was chosen to take care of first-team duties. He went on to manage Burnley for seven seasons, before resigning in August 1932 following a heavy defeat to Preston North End.
