= Thomas Wedge of Chester =

English agriculturalist

Thomas Wedge (1760–1854) was an 18th- and 19th-century English agriculturalist.

== Life ==
Wedge was the son of Francis Wedge of Fernhill House, near Forton, Staffordshire, a prosperous farmer, and brother of John Wedge and Charles Wedge of Shudy Camps. Thomas Wedge established himself on farms near Sealand, Flintshire where he prospered on the land.

In 1794 he wrote A General View of the Agriculture of the County Palatine of Chester (London, 1794) for the Board of Agriculture and Internal Improvement. Thomas Wedge married Susannah Couchman of Balsall Temple, Warwickshire, the daughter of Henry Couchman, the noted architect and landscape designer, but they had no children. He died in 1854 aged 94.

== Legacy ==
In 1852, Thomas Wedge paid for and endowed the Great Saughall School, in Saughall. The school later became known as the Thomas Wedge Church of England Junior School. It was closed in 2009 after being merged with another local school. Its building was demolished.

There is a Thomas Wedge Road in Saughall.

== Bibliography ==
- Wedge, Thomas (1794). General View of the Agriculture of the County Palatine of Chester, with Observations on the Means of Its Improvement. London: C. McRae.
