= Jack Sharp =

English sportsman

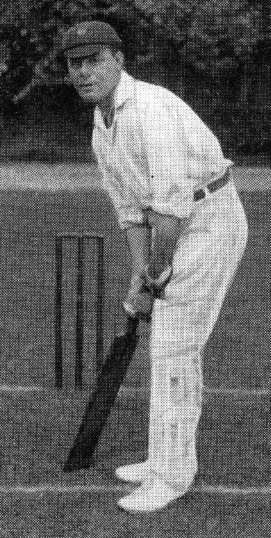

Personal information
- Date of birth: 15 February 1878
- Place of birth: Hereford, England
- Date of death: 28 January 1938 (aged 59)
- Place of death: Liverpool, England
- Position: Outside right

Youth career
- Hereford Thistle

Senior career*
Years	Team	Apps	(Gls)
1897–1899	Aston Villa	23	(15)
1899–1910	Everton	342	(76)

International career
1903–1905	England	2	(1)
- Cricket career
Cricket information
- Batting: Right-handed
- Bowling: Left-arm fast-medium
International information
- National side: England
- Test debut: 1 July 1909 v Australia
- Last Test: 9 August 1909 v Australia
Career statistics
Competition	Tests	First-class
Matches	3	534
Runs scored	188	22,715
Batting average	47.00	31.11
100s/50s	1/1	38/117
Top score	105	211
Balls bowled	183	22,063
Wickets	3	441
Bowling average	37.00	27.41
5 wickets in innings	0	18
10 wickets in match	0	3
Best bowling	3/67	9/77
Catches/stumpings	1/–	236/–
- Source: CricInfo, 30 March 2019
- * Club domestic league appearances and goals

John Sharp (15 February 1878 – 28 January 1938) was an English sportsman who is most famous for his eleven-season playing career at Everton from 1899 to 1910. It saw him win two caps for his country, as well as being a cricketer for Lancashire County Cricket Club who played in three Test matches for the England cricket team in 1909.

== Life ==
From 1899 to 1914 Sharp played cricket regularly for Lancashire and played in every match of 1904 when the Championship was won without a defeat. After World War I he played as an amateur and captained the Lancashire side from 1923 to 1925.

His position on the football pitch was right winger. After being signed from Aston Villa Sharp went on to be a Championship runner-up on three occasions with Everton, scored a goal in the club's 2–1 defeat to Sheffield Wednesday in the 1907 FA Cup Final and was an FA Cup winner one year previously against Newcastle United. His portrait appeared on 14 editions of cigarette packets, the mark of a popular sportsman at the time.

When his playing career ended, Sharp became a director of Everton, a position he held for many years. He started a sports shop in Whitechapel Liverpool, which existed until the 1980s before being taken over by JJB Sports and later closed. There was also a shop in Chester, within the Grosvenor Precinct. His shop was the official supplier of playing strips to both Everton and Liverpool for many years.

His brother, Bertram, was also a footballer with Aston Villa, Everton and Southampton who later became a director of Everton as well as a cricketer with Herefordshire County Cricket Club.

== See also ==
- List of English cricket and football players

Sporting positions
Preceded by Jack Taylor	Everton captain 1908–1910	Succeeded by Harry Makepeace
