= William Bagot =

William Bagot may refer to:

- William Bagot (politician) (died 1407), favourite of King Richard II of England and a major character in Shakespeare's Richard II
- William Bagot, 1st Baron Bagot (1728–1798), British politician
- William Bagot, 2nd Baron Bagot (1773–1856), British peer
- William Bagot, 3rd Baron Bagot (1811–1887), British courtier and Conservative politician
- William Bagot, 4th Baron Bagot (1857–1932), British peer and Conservative politician

== See also ==
- Baron Bagot
