= William Bagot, 4th Baron Bagot =

British peer, politician and art collector (1857-1932)

The Right Honourable The Lord Bagot JP

Gentleman Usher of the Privy Chamber
- In office 1885–1887

Personal details
- Born: William Bagot; 19 January 1857
- Died: 23 December 1932 (aged 75)
- Political party: Conservative
- Spouse: Lilian Marie May (m. 1903)
- Relations: George Agar-Ellis, 1st Baron Dover (grandfather)
- Children: Hon. Barbara Bagot
- Parent(s): William Bagot, 3rd Baron Bagot; Hon. Lucia Agar-Ellis
- Education: Eton College

Military service
- Allegiance: United Kingdom
- Branch/service: Staffordshire Yeomanry; Staffordshire Militia
- Rank: Lieutenant-Colonel

William Bagot, 4th Baron Bagot JP (19 January 1857 – 23 December 1932), was a British peer and Conservative politician and art collector.

== Early life ==
Bagot was the eldest son of two sons and five daughters born to William Bagot, 3rd Baron Bagot, and his wife, the former Hon. Lucia Caroline Elizabeth Agar-Ellis. His mother was a daughter of George Agar-Ellis, 1st Baron Dover and his sister, Louisa Bagot, married Hamar Alfred Bass of the Bass Brewery family in 1879. His paternal grandparents were William Bagot, 2nd Baron Bagot and his second wife Lady Louisa Legge (daughter of George Legge, 3rd Earl of Dartmouth).

Bagot was educated at Eton.

== Career ==
On 14 April 1875 he was commissioned as a sub-lieutenant in the Staffordshire Yeomanry, of which his father was the honorary colonel. On 4 December the same year he was commissioned in the same rank into the 2nd Battalion, King's Own (1st Staffordshire) Militia. Both of these were part-time regiments. He served as an aide-de-camp to the governor general of Canada from 1876 to 1883. He was promoted to captain in the 4th Battalion, South Staffordshire Regiment (as the militia had become) on 19 July 1879 and in the Staffordshire Yeomanry on 21 February 1880. He resigned from the militia on 29 March 1884, but remained in the yeomanry, being promoted to major on 11 May 1898. He later received the honorary rank of lieutenant-colonel and was second-in-command of the regiment, retiring on 30 November 1901.

Bagot also held the office of Gentleman Usher of the Privy Chamber from 1885 to 1887 and was a justice of the peace and deputy lieutenant for Derbyshire and Staffordshire. Between 1896 and 1901 he served as a Lord-in-waiting (government whip in the House of Lords) in the Conservative administration of Lord Salisbury.

== Personal life ==
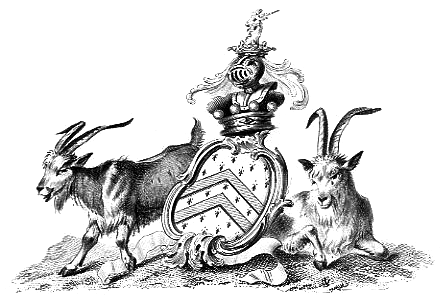
Bagot coat of arms

On 25 July 1903, Lord Bagot married the American Lilian Marie May (1863–1958) at Brompton Oratory. She was the youngest daughter of the late Henry May, a U.S. Representative from Maryland. The couple separated shortly after the christening of their only child, a daughter:

- Hon. Barbara Bagot (b. 1905), who married in Oscar Crosby Sewall, son of Oscar Trufant Sewall, of Bath, Maine, United States, in June 1934; they divorced in 1945 and he remarried in 1950 to Patricia Leighton Wilkins.

Lord Bagot was an art collector and owned paintings by Sir Joshua Reynolds, Sir Peter Lely, Veronese, Albrecht Dürer, Anthony van Dyck, Bartolomé Esteban Murillo, Le Nain, Frans Hals, van Eyck, and valuable relics of the reign of King Charles I. He was also an avid shooter, hunter, and fisher on his estates of more than 30,000 acres.

Lord Bagot died at Blithfield Hall, Rugeley, 23 December 1932, aged 75, and was succeeded in his titles by his second cousin Gerald William Bagot, 5th Baron Bagot. Lady Bagot died 21 February 1958.

Peerage of Great Britain
Preceded by William Bagot	Baron Bagot; 1887–1932	Succeeded by Gerald Bagot
