= Gerald Bagot, 5th Baron Bagot =

British peer

The Right Honourable The Lord Bagot
- Born: Gerald William Bagot; 13 May 1866
- Died: 5 April 1946 (aged 79)
- Education: Haileybury College
- Parent(s): Henry Bagot; Eleanor Chandos-Pole
- Relatives: Richard Bagot (grandfather); Edward Sacheverell Chandos-Pole (grandfather)

Gerald William Bagot, 5th Baron Bagot (13 May 1866 – 5 April 1946), was an English aristocrat and landowner.

== Early life ==
He was the son of Vice-Admiral Henry Bagot (1846–1922) and, his second wife, Eleanor Chandos-Pole (1843–1886). From his father's first marriage to Wilhelmina Frederica Bagot (daughter of Rt. Hon. Sir Charles Bagot), he had an elder half-brother, Arthur Greville Bagot, who died in 1915 before inheriting the family titles that Gerald eventually inherited in 1932. From his parents' marriage, he had two elder brothers, Henry Richard Reginald Bagot and Claud Leveson Bagot, who both died without male issue in 1908 and 1930, respectively. His elder sister, Florence Eleanor Bagot, married and divorced their cousin, Charles Frederick Heneage Bagot (a son of the Rev. Charles Walter Bagot).

His paternal grandparents were Rt. Rev. Hon. Richard Bagot, Bishop of Oxford, and Lady Harriet Villiers (a daughter of the 4th Earl of Jersey). His maternal grandparents were Edward Sacheverell Chandos-Pole and Anna Maria Wilmot (a daughter of Rev. Edward Sacheverel Wilmot).

He was educated at Haileybury College, Hertfordshire.

== Career ==
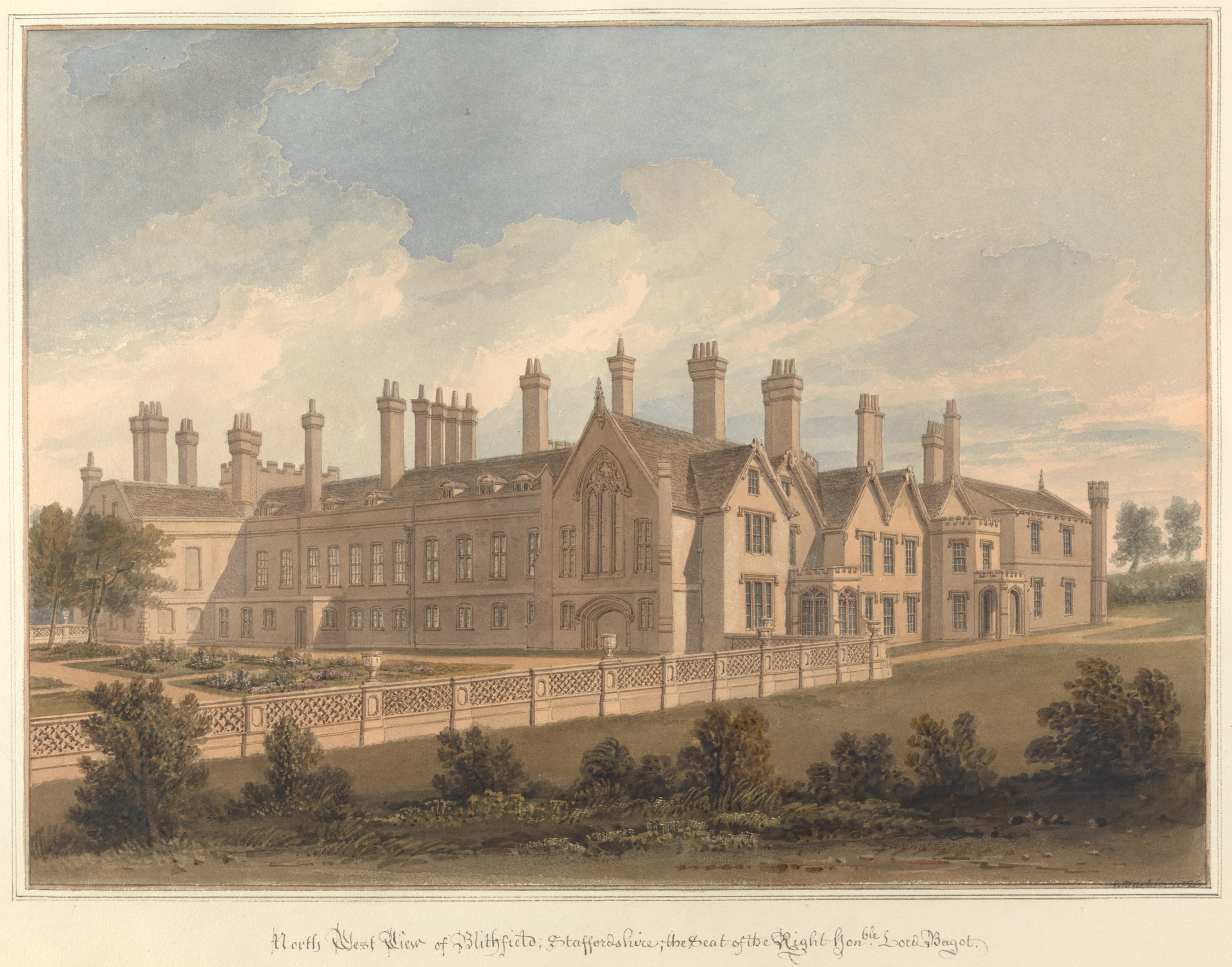
Blithfield Hall

On 23 December 1932, he succeeded to the Barony of Bagot's Bromley and the Baronetcy of Blithfield Hall, on the death of his second cousin, art patron William Bagot, 4th Baron Bagot. He also inherited the family home of Blithfield Hall in Staffordshire, together with the Bagot collection which included paintings by "Sir Joshua Reynolds, Sir Peter Lely, Veronese, Dürer, Van Dyck, Murillo, Le Nain, Hals, Van Eyck, and valuable relics of the reign of Charles I."

In 1945, Lord Bagot sold the dilapidated Blithfield Hall and it's 650-acre estate to the Staffordshire Water Works Company for the creation of Blithfield Reservoir.

== Personal life ==
Lord Bagot died, unmarried, on 5 April 1946 in Staffordshire. He was succeeded by his first cousin, once removed, Caryl (a son of the Rev. Lewis Richard Charles Bagot). His wife Nancy, Lady Bagot (née Nancy Spicer) bought back Blithfield Hall and 30 acres of the former estate, restoring the Hall as the seat of the family. Upon his death in 1961, the Hall went to his widow and, eventually, to the family of his sister, Enid Bagot Jewitt.

Peerage of Great Britain
Preceded by William Bagot	Baron Bagot; 1932–1946	Succeeded by Caryl Bagot
