= Henry Paget, 4th Marquess of Anglesey =

British peer, vice admiral and honorary colonel in the military

The Most Honourable The Marquess of Anglesey PC
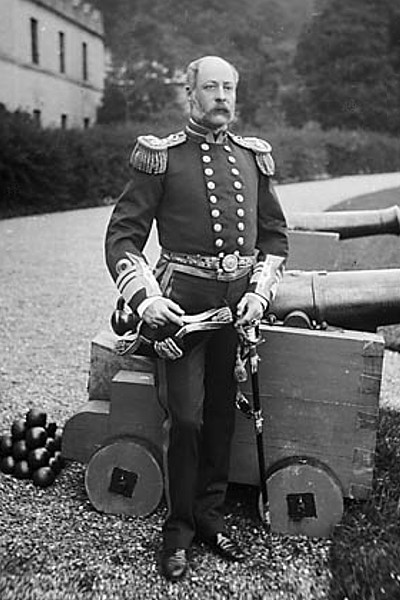
- Paget, in about 1885, by Welsh photographer John Thomas
- In office 3 January 1880 – 13 October 1898
- Monarch: Victoria
- Succeeded by: 5th Marquess of Anglesey

Personal details
- Born: 25 December 1835 United Kingdom
- Died: 13 October 1898 (aged 62) Plas Newydd, Anglesey, Wales
- Party: Whig
- Spouses: Elisabeth Norman; Blanche Mary Boyd; Mary Livingstone Key
- Children: Henry Paget, 5th Marquess of Anglesey
- Parents: Henry Paget, 2nd Marquess of Anglesey; Henrietta Bagot

Henry Paget, 4th Marquess of Anglesey PC (25 December 1835 – 13 October 1898) was a British peer. He served as Vice-Admiral of the Coast, North Wales and Carmarthenshire.

== Background ==
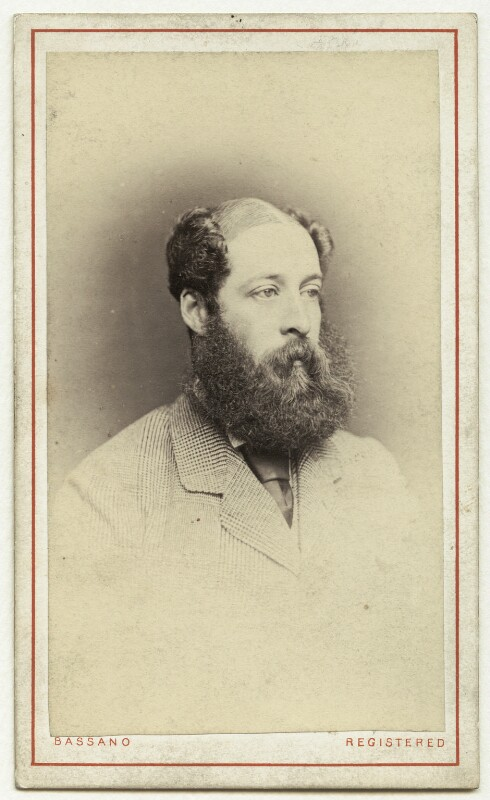
Henry

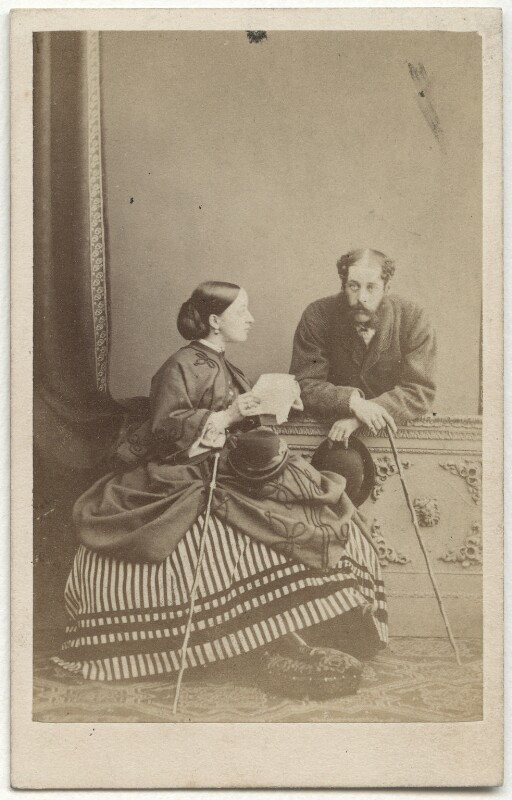
Henry with his sister Lady Florence, Marchioness of Hastings.

Anglesey was the second son of Henry Paget, 2nd Marquess of Anglesey, by his second wife Henrietta Bagot, fourth daughter of Charles Bagot and Lady Anne Wellesley (niece of Duke of Wellington). On 30 January 1880 he succeeded to the titles of 5th Earl of Uxbridge, co. Middlesex, 7th Baronet Bayly of Plas Newydd, Anglesey and Mount Bagenall, and 13th Lord Paget, of Beaudesert (Staffordshire). He owned a large part of the County of Anglesey.

He was commissioned as a cornet in the part-time Staffordshire Yeomanry on 20 March 1857 and was appointed captain of the Anglesey, Staffordshire, Troop of the regiment on 11 October 1859. He was promoted to major on 9 October 1874, and later gained the honorary rank of lieutenant-colonel. In 1884 the commanding officer died during the regiment's annual training, and Anglesey succeeded as Lt-Col Commandant. After his retirement he was appointed honorary colonel of the regiment on 5 March 1887. He was also Honorary Colonel of the 2nd Volunteer Battalion, Royal Welch Fusiliers.

He married firstly Elizabeth Norman, secondly Blanche Mary Boyd and thirdly from 1880 an American heiress, Mary "Minna" Livingston King, the widow of Hon. Henry Wodehouse.

He owned 29,700 acres, with most of his income coming from 17,000 acres in Stafford. which generated annual income of £110,000 per annum. Equivalent to £12 million per year in 2025).

Peerage of the United Kingdom
Preceded by Henry Paget	Marquess of Anglesey; 1880–1898	Succeeded by Henry Paget
Military offices
Preceded by William Bromley-Davenport	Lieutenant-Colonel Commandant, Staffordshire Yeomanry; 1884–1887	Succeeded by Theophilus John Levett
Preceded by Lord Bagot	Honorary Colonel, Staffordshire Yeomanry; 1887–	Vacant
