= Caryl Bagot, 6th Baron Bagot =

British Baron (1877-1961)

Caryl Ernest Bagot, 6th Baron Bagot (9 March 1877 – 5 August 1961), was the son of Rev. Lewis Richard Charles Bagot (1846–1922) Vicar of Stanton Lacy, Shropshire. He succeeded to the Barony of Bagot's Bromley and the Baronetcy of Blithfield Hall on the death of his cousin Gerald Bagot, 5th Baron Bagot on 5 April 1946.

He was educated at Radley College, Abingdon, and served in the Irish Guards in World War I reaching the rank of lieutenant.

He married twice; firstly in 1911 and secondly to Nancy Spicer of Sydney, Australia, in 1940.

His predecessor the 5th Baron had sold the family estate at Blithfield Hall, Staffordshire, in 1945 to a waterworks company. He was able to buy back the house and 30 acres (120,000 m^{2}) of land and began a long programme of renovation and restoration of the property. In 1956 he was able to open the house to the public.

On his death he bequeathed the property to his widow Nancy, Lady Bagot, and to the family of his sister Enid Bagot Jewitt.

He was succeeded by his cousin, Harry Bagot, 7th Baron Bagot.

Peerage of Great Britain
Preceded by Gerald Bagot	Baron Bagot; 1946–1961	Succeeded by Harry Eric Bagot
