= Listed buildings in Blithfield =

Blithfield is a civil parish in the district of East Staffordshire, Staffordshire, England. It contains 27 listed buildings that are recorded in the National Heritage List for England. Of these, two are listed at Grade I, the highest of the three grades, three are at Grade II*, the middle grade, and the others are at Grade II, the lowest grade. The most important buildings in the parish are St Leonard's Church and Blithfield Hall, which are both listed at Grade I. Most of the other listed buildings in the parish are associated with these buildings, and include items in the churchyard. and around or in the grounds of the hall. The parish includes the village of Admaston, and is otherwise rural. The other listed buildings are houses, farmhouses and farm buildings, and a former school.

== Key ==
Grade	Criteria
I	Buildings of exceptional interest, sometimes considered to be internationally important
II*	Particularly important buildings of more than special interest
II	Buildings of national importance and special interest

== Buildings ==
Name and location	Photograph	Date	Notes	Grade
St Leonard's Church; 52.81347°N 1.93589°W		c. 1300	The vestry was added in 1829–30, the chancel was restored by Augustus Pugin, and the south porch, designed by G. E. Street, was added in 1860. The church is built in stone with a slate roof, and consists of a nave with a clerestory, north and south aisles, a south porch, an octagonal north vestry and a west tower. The tower has two stages, diagonal buttresses, a two-light west window, and an embattled parapet. The nave also has an embattled parapet.	I
Churchyard cross 52.81331°N 1.93586°W		14th century	The cross is in the churchyard of St Leonard's Church. The oldest parts are the steps, which are octagonal, and the base. The upper parts date from about 1814, and consist of an elaborately carved tapering shaft surmounted by an ornate canopied crucifix.	II
Lower Booth Farmhouse; 52.84189°N 1.93810°W	—	15th century (probable)	The farmhouse, which was later altered, is timber framed with a tile roof. There are two storeys and an attic, and a T-shaped plan, consisting of a hall range and a two-bay cross-wing. The central doorway has a cambered lintel, and the windows are casements, and there is a gabled dormer. Inside the house is a pair of cruck blades.	II*
Blithfield Hall; 52.81302°N 1.93474°W		16th century	A country house with medieval origin, it was extended in the 18th century, and remodelled in 1820–24 in Tudor Revival style. It is built in brick, plastered and painted to resemble timber framing, and has slate roofs. There are four ranges surrounding a rectangular courtyard, with extensions to the east and northeast, and the house is in two and three storeys. The main entrance is through a gatehouse in the centre of the south range. The windows are of differing types, including some that are mullioned, some transomed, sash windows and casement windows, and there is an oriel window. Other features include embattled parapets, gables, some with bargeboards, and octagonal turrets.	I
Blythe Moor; 52.80701°N 1.92728°W	—	17th century (probable)	The house, which was extended and largely rebuilt in 1900, is timber framed with brick infill and has a tile roof. There are two storeys and an attic, and three bays. The upper storey in the south gable end is jettied with a moulded bressumer on moulded brackets. There is a gabled porch, a doorway with a dated lintel, the windows are casements with latticed glazing, and there are two gabled dormers.	II
The Woodlands; 52.82599°N 1.94385°W	—	17th century	The house, which has been extended, is timber framed with roughcast infill and a tile roof. There is one storey and an attic, four bays, and a single-storey extension to the left. The windows are casements, and there are three gabled dormers.	II
Vaughan's Lane Farmhouse; 52.82432°N 1.94579°W		Late 17th century	A cottage that was later extended, it has a timber framed core, and the outer walls have been refaced in brick and painted. The roof is thatched, the cottage has one storey and an attic, four bays, a rear extension, and a 20th-century conservatory to the right. The doorway has a segmental head, the windows are casements, most with segmental heads, and there is a dormer. Inside there is a timber-framed partition.	II
Churchyard wall and gateway to Blithfield Hall; 52.81340°N 1.93555°W		18th century	The wall is in red brick with stone coping and the gateway is in stone. The wall, which is about 5 feet (1.5 m) high, encloses the east and south sides of the churchyard of St Leonard's Church. The gateway has a gabled four-centred arched opening, and is flanked by diagonal buttresses.	II
Higher Booth Farmhouse; 52.84050°N 1.93781°W	—	18th century	The farmhouse is in red brick with bands and a tile roof. There are two storeys and an attic, and a roughly L-shaped plan. It has a front of three bays, the central doorway has a segmental head, and a rectangular fanlight, and the windows are casements with segmental heads.	II
Ice House; 52.81266°N 1.93646°W	—	18th century (probable)	The ice house is in the grounds of Blithfield Hall. It is in brick, it has a short brick-lined entrance leading to a conical domed interior, and is covered by an earth.	II
Stable and outbuilding, Vaughan's Lane; 52.82445°N 1.94594°W	—	18th century (possible)	The older part is the outbuilding, which is timber framed. The stable dates from about 1840, it is in red brick with dentilled eaves, and both have tile roofs. They each have one storey, the outbuilding has one bay, and the stable has three bays and a central doorway flanked by round-headed openings.	II
The Orangery, Blithfield Hall; 52.81346°N 1.93526°W	—	c. 1769	The orangery, designed by James Stuart, is in brick with a dentilled eaves cornice, the front and sides faced in limestone, and the front of the roof glazed. It has a long rectangular plan, with one storey, and nine bays, flanked by tripartite pavilions. The front is open, with Tuscan pilasters. Each pavilion has pilasters, a pediment, and a central doorway with a moulded surround and a flat hood on console brackets, flanked by round-headed niches. Above the doorway and niches are a frieze and panels. At the rear are porticos, and below the east end is an underground chamber.	II*
Main gateway and walls, Blithfield Hall; 52.81304°N 1.93410°W	—	c. 1820	The gateway is in plastered brick, and has a four-centred arch with panelled spandrels and a hood mould, above which is a string course and an embattled parapet. The gateway is flanked by octagonal turrets with pseudo-machicolated battlements, outside which are embattled walls leading to further octagonal turrets. There are walls leading from the gateway to the house on the right side and to the courtyard on the left side.	II*
Coach House Mews, wall and arch 52.81305°N 1.93364°W	—	c. 1820	The former coach house and stables have been converted into residential accommodation. They are in plastered brick, and consist of four ranges around a rectangular courtyard. There are two storeys, and they have a moulded band and an embattled parapet. The front has five bays flanked by octagonal embattled turrets and contain a central gatehouse. The gatehouse has a four-centred carriage arch, and square windows with hood moulds. To the north is an embattled wall about 10 yards (9.1 m) long containing a four-centred arch with buttresses.	II
Bagot Lodge, railings and gate piers 52.80673°N 1.92800°W		Early 19th century	The lodge, which was extended in the 20th century, is at the entrance to the main drive to Blithfield Hall, and is in Gothic style. It is in stone and has a slate roof with coped verges, and a gable on each of its four sides. There is one storey and a square plan, with one bay. On the front facing the road is a five-light window with trefoil-headed lights, above which is a hood mould and three heraldic shields. On the front facing the drive is a doorway with a moulded surround, over which is a hood mould and a heraldic shield. On the left are cast iron railings and panelled gate piers.	II
Courtyard walls and outbuilding, Blithfield Hall; 52.81344°N 1.93397°W	—	Early 19th century	The walls and outbuilding are in plastered brick. The walls surround the north, south and east sides of the courtyard. The south wall contains a central four-centred carriage arch with an embattled parapet, the flanking walls are also embattled, and they each contain a four-centred arch and buttresses. The north wall contains a carriage arch, and the wall to the left has two storeys and three bays. The outbuilding to the right also has two storeys, and both are embattled. In the upper floor of the outbuilding are louvred rectangular windows, and the wall contains lancet windows and four-light windows with square heads and a hood mould.	II
Fence northwest of Blithfield Hall; 52.81312°N 1.93540°W	—	Early 19th century	The fence is in cast iron on a chamfered stone plinth, and contains trellis work decorated with rosettes. It runs from the hall for about 10 yards (9.1 m), then turns at a right angle to run for about 100 yards (91 m) to join the churchyard wall. The piers are in stone, they are panelled, and have moulded coping.	II
Fence and steps northeast of Blithfield Hall; 52.81344°N 1.93476°W	—	Early 19th century	The fence is in cast iron on a chamfered stone plinth, and contains trellis work decorated with rosettes. It runs from the hall for about 50 yards (46 m), then turns at a right angle to meet the Orangery. In the eastern side is an opening leading to the steps. The piers are in stone, they are panelled, and have moulded coping. The piers flaking the steps also are surmounted by urns.	II
Game Larder and walls, Blithfield Hall; 52.81354°N 1.93445°W	—	Early 19th century (probable)	Originally a dovecote, and later a game larder, the building was extended in 1861. It is in plastered brick, and has a slate roof. There are two storeys, an octagonal plan, and one cell. In the ground floor are circular windows, the upper floor contains cross windows and a gabled porch approached by steps, and at the top is a louvred dormer and a weathervane. On each side are coped brick walls, one extending for about 50 yards (46 m) to the north east, and containing a four-centred arched doorway, and the other about 30 yards (27 m) to the south.	II
Sundial, Blithfield Hall; 52.81285°N 1.93444°W	—	Early 19th century	The sundial is in stone, and has a cylindrical base with a moulded rim on two steps. It is decorated with swags and goats' heads.	II
Friary Lodge, railings and gate piers 52.80667°N 1.92827°W	—	Early 19th century	The lodge, which was extended in the 20th century, is at the entrance to the main drive to Blithfield Hall, and is in Gothic style. It is in stone and has a slate roof with coped verges, and a gable on each of its four sides. There is one storey and a square plan, with one bay. On the front facing the road is a five-light window with trefoil-headed lights, above which is a hood mould and three heraldic shields. On the front facing the drive is a doorway with a moulded surround, over which is a hood mould and a heraldic shield. On the right are cast iron railings and panelled gate piers.	II
Sedge Cottage and The Smithy; 52.80667°N 1.92720°W	—	Early 19th century	A pair of cottages with dentilled eaves and a tile roof. There are two storeys and five bays. Each cottage has a lean-to porch, the windows are casements, those in the ground floor with segmental heads, and there are four gablets. The right cottage has louvred shutters.	II
Bridge, gate piers, and ha-ha, Blithfield Hall; 52.81285°N 1.93363°W	—	Early to mid 19th century	The bridge and gate piers are in stone, and the wall and ha-ha are in red brick with stone coping. The bridge has a four-centred arch and parapets, and is flanked by square gate piers. On each side of these is an embattled wall with buttresses, about 5 yards (4.6 m) long, and the right wall continues as a ha-ha for about 50 yards (46 m).	II
Water Tower; 52.81205°N 1.93559°W	—	Early to mid 19th century	The water tower is in rendered brick, and in Gothic style. There is an octagonal plan, and three stages are apparent. In the centre is a Tudor arched doorway, and above are loops, and an embattled parapet with pseudo-machicolation.	II
Well house 52.81181°N 1.93644°W	—	Early to mid 19th century	The well house is in the grounds of Blithfield Hall. It is in rendered brick, and in Tudor Gothic style, with a square plan, and diagonal buttresses. The building consists of an open Tudor arch, with a hood mould, a moulded parapet band, and an embattled parapet.	II
Newton Hurst Farmhouse; 52.83391°N 1.92237°W	—	Mid 19th century	The farmhouse is in red brick with a tile roof. There are two storeys and an irregular plan, with four ranges forming two L-shapes. The house has a lean-to porch, a bay window, casement windows with decorative glazing, and gables with decorative bargeboards.	II
Blithfield House; 52.80812°N 1.92820°W	—	1856–57	A school and schoolmaster's house, later a village hall, designed by G. E. Street. It is in red brick with stone dressings and a tile roof with ridge cresting, and is in Tudor Revival style. The school has mullioned and transomed windows with moulded hood moulds, a gabled dormer, and a belfry with a lead-covered spirelet. The house has two storeys, a main range of two bays, and a projecting gabled wing on the right. The doorway has a segmental pointed head, and the windows are a mix of cross windows and mullioned and transomed windows.	II
