= Bagot goat =

Breed of goat

Bagot
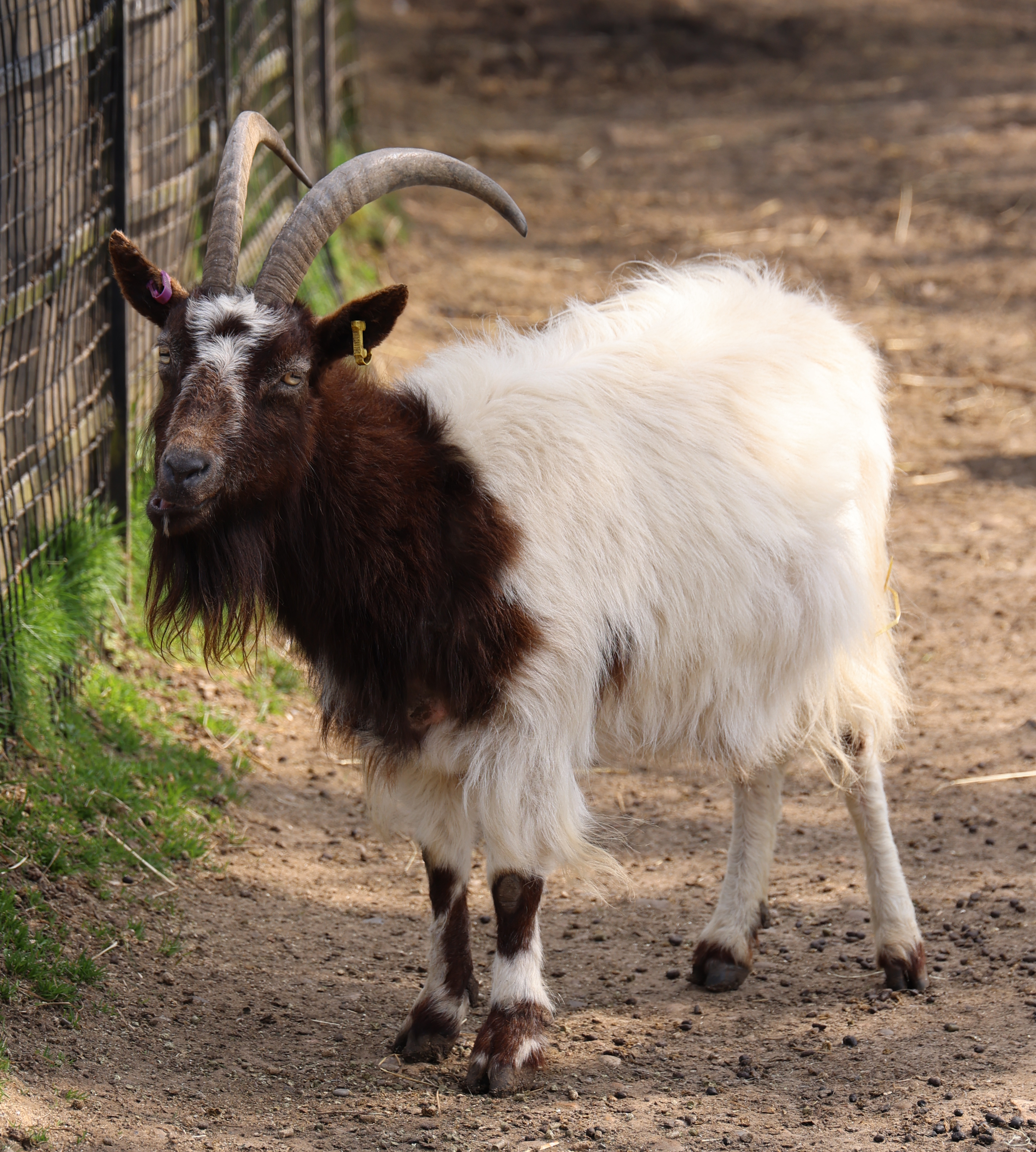
- A Bagot goat
- Conservation status: Vulnerable
- Country of origin: England

Traits
- Coat: white
- Face colour: black
- Goat; Capra aegagrus hircus

The Bagot goat /ˈbæɡət/ is a breed of goat which for several hundred years has lived semi-wild at Blithfield Hall, Staffordshire, England. It is a small goat, with a black head and neck and the remainder of the body white.

In 2010 it was considered "critically endangered" by the Rare Breeds Survival Trust, as there were fewer than 100 registered breeding females in the United Kingdom, but by 2012 had been upgraded to "vulnerable", where it remains as of 2019, with 200-300 breeding females known.

== Description ==
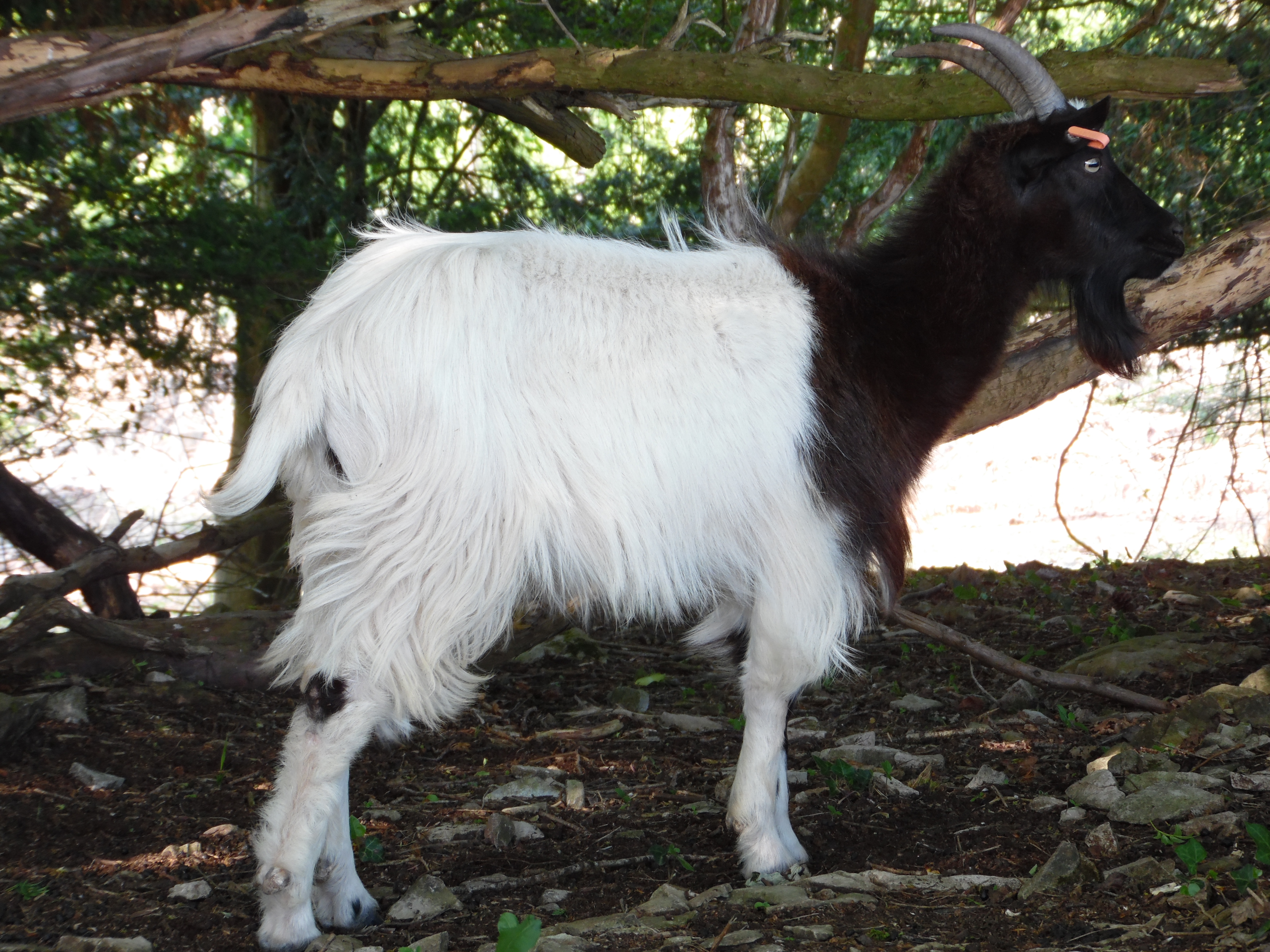
Juvenile

It is a small goat, with a black head and neck to the withers/girth and the remainder of the body predominantly white.

== History ==
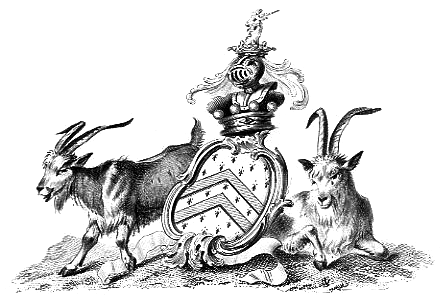
Arms of the Barons Bagot, featuring the Bagot goat

Bagot goats were introduced to England at Blithfield Hall in the 1380s. They were probably brought back to England by returning Crusaders, and probably trace their ancestry to goats of the Rhone valley. The goats were said to have been given to John Bagot of Blithfield by King Richard II of England to commemorate good hunting the King had enjoyed at Blithfield.

As of March 2017, there were said to be fewer than 200 registered breeding females.

By May 2018, the Rare Breed Survival Trust Watchlist reported between 200 and 300 registered breeding females.

== Uses ==
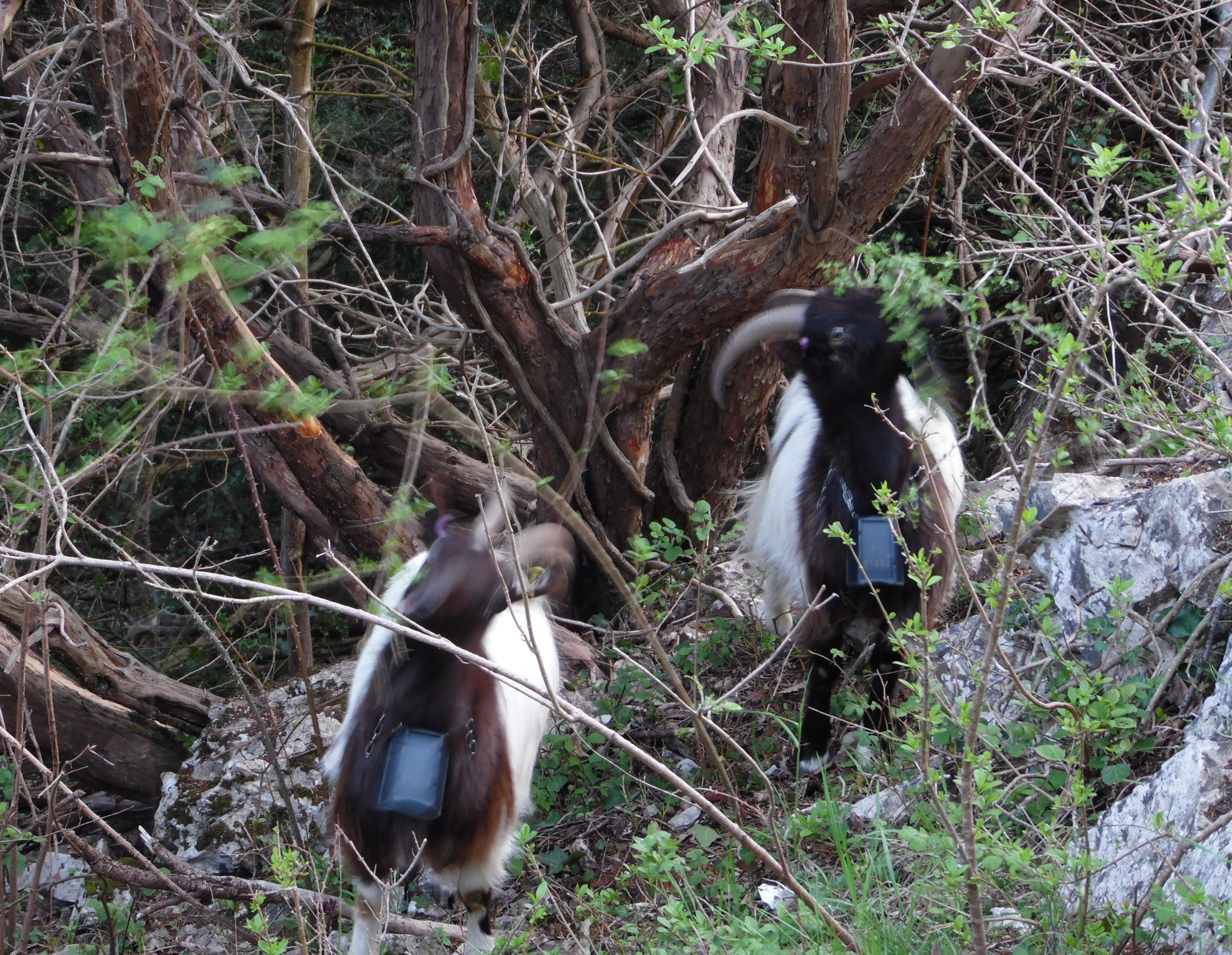
A pair of Bagot goats being used for conservation grazing

Bagot goats have no commercial purpose being too small by comparison to the Boer Goat to be viable as a meat breed; producing high quality but low volumes of milk (consistent with generally producing a single kid) by comparison to the Swiss dairy breeds, and producing too little cashmere to compete with the Angora. However, they are good for conservation grazing and have been used at RSPB reserves in Wales, Kent and Canterbury, where their browsing activity promotes diversity in the ground conditions beneficial to other wildlife.. In April 2021 4 young Bagot goats were introduced to the Avon Gorge in Bristol to help control the growth of unwanted scrub on this SSSI and as a supplement the 2 surviving Kashmiri goats originally released for the same purpose in 2011.

== Flocks ==
A flock is still kept by the Bagot family in the deer park of Levens Hall, Cumbria. Examples can also be seen at:

- Birmingham Wildlife Conservation Park
- Lake District Wildlife Park, Cumbria
- Shugborough Hall in Staffordshire
- Mary Arden's Farm in Warwickshire
- Aldenham Country Park in Hertfordshire
- South of England Rare Breeds Centre
- St James City Farm in Gloucester
- Bagot's Castle, Warwickshire
- Wimpole Home Farm, Cambridgeshire
- Forge Mill Farm, Sandwell Valley Country Park, West Bromwich
- Farmer and television presenter Adam Henson has a flock, started in 1975 by his father, which has featured in his Countryfile appearances.
- Kingston Maurward House, Gardens and Animal Park in Dorset
- Formerly on the cliffs of Cromer in Norfolk. (Relocated to Cranwich Heath, Thetford in early 2024 for breeding due to veterinary and welfare costs)
- Ayleswood Rare Breeds in Meikleour, Perthshire
- Hadleigh Farm, in Essex
- Palacerigg Farm Park in Lanarkshire
- Tannaghmore Farm, Northern Ireland
- The LintMill, South Lanarkshire
- Staunton Country Park, in Hampshire
- Hartpury University and Hartpury College
- Cragend Farm, Rothbury Northumberland: January 2020
- Knowsley Safari, 2025

== The Bagot Goat Society ==
The Bagot Goat Society manages the Bagot Goat herd book on behalf of its members and owners of Bagot Goats. It holds an annual show and sale in conjunction with the "Traditional and Native Breeds Show and Sale" at Melton Mowbray Market.

== Postage stamps ==
An illustration of the species by Harry Titcombe featured on the cover of a 1982 book of British postage stamp, issued from vending machines, at a price of 50p. In January 2005, the breed was featured on a first-class British stamp, one of a set of ten, in a se-tenant block, designed by Rose Design using linocut illustrations by Christopher Wormell.
