= Elmhurst Hall =

Coordinates: 52°42′30.61″N 1°50′16.59″W

Elmhurst Hall was a country house in the village of Elmhurst, Staffordshire. The house was located approximately 1.5 miles north of the city of Lichfield.

== First hall (1683-1806) ==
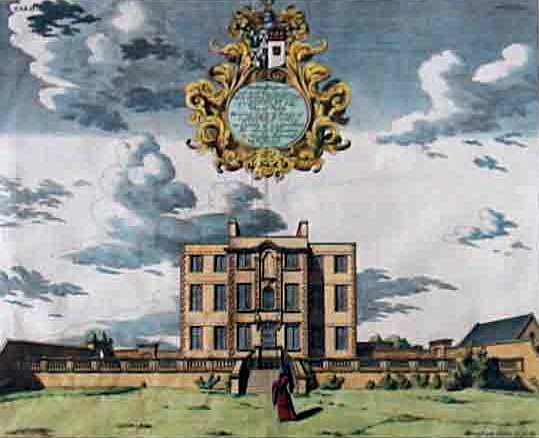
The original hall (1683-1806) in 1686

The original hall was built by Sir Michael Biddulph after his succession in 1683. This building replaced a smaller house on the site which had been occupied by his father Sir Theophilius Biddulph. The hall consisted of three storeys with a parapeted roof, seven bays wide, with three central bays projecting. Sir Michael Biddulph who was MP several times for Lichfield gained possession of the land after succeeding his father Theophilius Biddulph. The hall remained in the Biddulph family until 1765. In 1765 Elmhurst Hall and 370 acres of land (some of it in Kings Bromley) were sold to Samuel Swinfen of Swinfen in Weeford. Samuel died in 1770 and was succeeded in by his brother Thomas, who died in 1784 to be succeeded by his son John.

Francis Perceval Eliot, the army officer and later writer, moved to Elmhurst Hall as a tenant in 1790. In the same year he agreed to buy the Hall and the 352-acre estate from John Swinfen. Eliot also acquired the Stychbrook estate, the leasehold on Lea Grange and the leasehold of the land owned by the Vicars Choral of Lichfield Cathedral. Eliot eventually held 850 acres of land north of Lichfield, he borrowed heavily to buy the land and in 1797 he unsuccessfully put up the land for sale as he could not meet repayments. Eliot moved out to Lichfield and demolished the derelict hall in 1806 when it would not sell.

== Second hall (1808-1921) ==
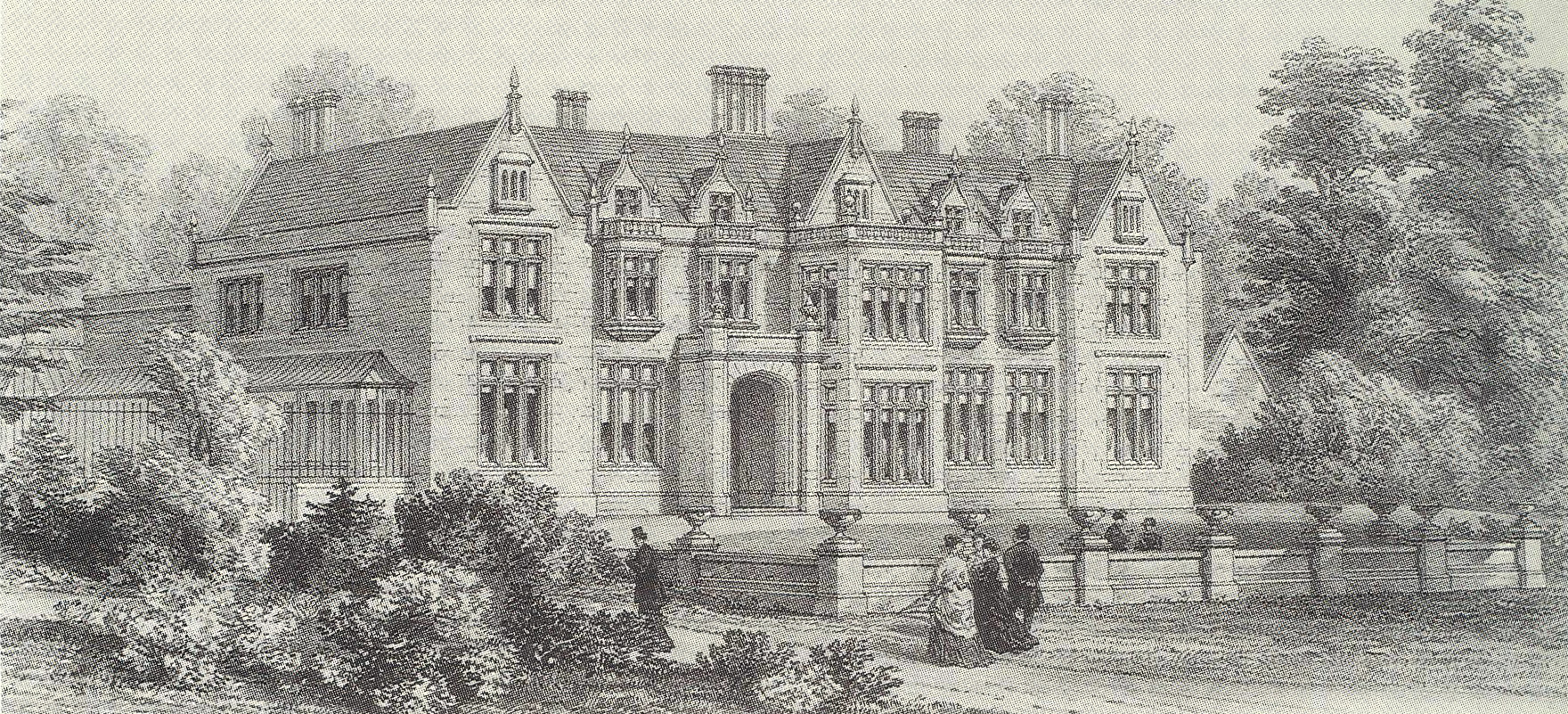
The second hall (1808-1921) in 1874

In 1808, John Smith of Fenton bought a large part of the estate, including the site of the Hall, from Eliot who moved back to London. Smith built a new Elmhurst Hall on his new estate. The new hall was built of brick with stone dressings in an Elizabethan style. The front was gabled with seven bays and an off-centre porch. The hall was approached from a long drive from Tewnalls Lane. In 1816, Smith became High Sheriff of Staffordshire. A small lodge was built on Tewnalls Lane in 1832. Smith lived at the hall until his death in 1840 when the hall was passed to his son, Charles.

Charles Smith sold the hall in 1856 to Newton John Lane. Lane died in 1869.

In 1874 his trustees sold the hall to George Fox (a retired Manchester businessman). During this time a lodge was built south of the hall, this lodge survives today and the building style matches that of the hall. In 1894 George Fox let the hall to the Duke of Sutherland so that he could entertain the Prince of Wales when he visited Lichfield for the centenary of the Staffordshire Yeomanry, which had been founded by Eliot in 1798.

In 1895, the hall was sold to Henry Mitchell (the Smethwick Brewer). Mitchell lived in the house until his death in 1914. After Mitchell's death, the executors of his estate put it up for sale and, after years without sale, the hall was demolished in 1921.

== Today ==
In 1922 the estate was sold to a syndicate who split up the estate. The site of the demolished hall, the surviving farm buildings and 30 acres were sold to William Snelson, who set up Hall Farm, which survives today.
