= William Bagot, 3rd Baron Bagot =

British courtier and Conservative politician (1811-1887)

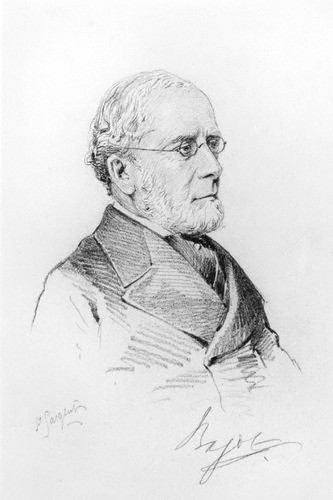
William Bagot, 3rd Baron Bagot, pencil, Frederick Sargent, circa 1880. National Portrait Gallery, London

William Bagot, 3rd Baron Bagot DL (27 March 1811 – 19 January 1887), styled The Honourable from birth until 1856, was a British courtier and Conservative politician.

== Background ==
Born at Blithfield House, he was the eldest son of William Bagot, 2nd Baron Bagot and his second wife Lady Louisa, daughter of George Legge, 3rd Earl of Dartmouth. Bagot was educated at Charterhouse School, then at Eton College and finally at Magdalene College, Cambridge.

== Career ==
He was returned to Parliament for Denbighshire in 1835, a seat he held until 1852. In 1856, Bagot succeeded his father as baron, entering the House of Lords. He served in the Conservative administrations of the Earl of Derby and Benjamin Disraeli as a Lord-in-waiting (government whip in the House of Lords) from 1866 to 1868 and again from 1874 to 1880.

Apart from his political career he was Gentleman of the Bedchamber to the Prince Consort between 1858 and the next year.

He was commissioned as a captain in the part-time Staffordshire Yeomanry on 29 August 1827, commanding the Uttoxeter Troop during the Chartist disturbances in 1842 and later acting as regimental commander in the absence of the elderly commanding officer. He was promoted to major on 25 April 1848 and lieutenant-colonel in 1851, and was appointed Lt-Col Commandant on 11 April 1854. He retired from the command in 1874 and was appointed the regiment's first honorary colonel. He was also a deputy lieutenant for Staffordshire.

== Family ==
Lord Bagot married the Hon. Lucia Caroline Elizabeth, daughter of George Agar-Ellis, 1st Baron Dover, in 1851. They had two sons and five daughters. Their daughter Louisa married Hamar Alfred Bass of the Bass Brewery family in 1879. Bagot died in January 1887, aged 75, and was succeeded in the barony by his eldest son William. Lady Bagot survived her husband by eight years and died in January 1895, aged 68.

== Notes ==
Parliament of the United Kingdom
Preceded by Sir Watkin Williams-Wynn; Robert Myddleton-Biddulph	Member of Parliament for Denbighshire; 1835–1852; With: Sir Watkin Williams-Wynn 1835–1840; Hugh Cholmondeley 1840–1841; Sir Watkin Williams-Wynn 1841–1852	Succeeded by Sir Watkin Williams-Wynn; Robert Myddleton-Biddulph
Military offices
Preceded by Earl of Lichfield	Lieutenant-Colonel Commandant, Staffordshire Yeomanry; 1854–1874	Succeeded by William Bromley-Davenport
New post	Honorary Colonel, Staffordshire Yeomanry; 1874–1887	Succeeded by Marquess of Anglesey
Peerage of the United Kingdom
Preceded by William Bagot	Baron Bagot; 1856–1887	Succeeded by William Bagot
