= Baron Bagot =

Barony in the Peerage of Great Britain

Barony of Bagot
- Ermine, two chevronels azure
- Creation date: 12 October 1780
- Created by: King George III
- Peerage: Peerage of Great Britain
- First holder: William Bagot, 1st Baron Bagot
- Present holder: Charles Bagot, 10th Baron Bagot
- Heir presumptive: Julian William D'Arcy Bagot
- Remainder to: the 1st Baron's heirs male of the body lawfully begotten
- Seat: Blithfield Hall

Baron Bagot, of Bagot's Bromley in the County of Stafford, is a title in the Peerage of Great Britain. It was created on 12 October 1780 for Sir William Bagot, 6th Baronet.

== Bagot family ==
The Bagot family has held land in Staffordshire since at least the 11th century. One member of the family, Hervey Bagot, represented Staffordshire in Parliament and fought as a Royalist in the Civil War. He was High Sheriff of Staffordshire in 1626 and on 31 May 1627 he was created a baronet, of Blithfield Hall, in the County of Staffordshire, in the Baronetage of England. His son (the second Baronet), grandson (third Baronet) and great-grandson (fourth Baronet) also represented Staffordshire in the House of Commons.

The latter's son, the fifth Baronet, sat as a Member of Parliament for Staffordshire as well as for Newcastle-under-Lyme and Oxford University. He was succeeded by his son, the aforementioned sixth Baronet. He represented Staffordshire in Parliament as a Tory from 1754 to 1780. In the latter year he was raised to the peerage as Baron Bagot, of Bagot's Bromley in the County of Stafford. His grandson, the third Baron, sat as a Conservative Member of Parliament for Denbighshire and after entering the House of Lords served as a government whip under the Earl of Derby and Benjamin Disraeli.

On the death of his son, the fourth Baron, the line of the eldest son of the first Baron failed. The titles passed to his second cousin, the fifth Baron. He was the son of Vice-Admiral Henry Bagot, third son of the Right Reverend the Hon. Richard Bagot, Bishop of Oxford and of Bath and Wells, fifth son of the first Baron. He was succeeded by his first cousin once removed, the sixth Baron. He was the son of Reverend Lewis Richard Charles Bagot, eldest son of Reverend Charles Walter Bagot, fourth son of the aforementioned Richard Bagot, fifth son of the first Baron. When he died the titles were inherited by his first cousin, the seventh Baron. He was the son of Charles Frederick Heneage Bagot, fourth son of Reverend Charles Walter Bagot (see above). On his death the titles passed to his younger brother, the eighth Baron, and then to their half-brother, the ninth Baron. As of 2014 the titles are held by the latter's son, the tenth Baron, who succeeded in 2001.

Since 30 June 2006, the present Baron Bagot has not successfully proven his succession to the baronetcy and is not therefore on the Official Roll of the Baronetage. However, the case is under review by the Registrar of the Baronetage.

The ancestral seat of the Bagot family is Blithfield Hall in Staffordshire. A junior branch of the Bagot family had their seat at Pype Hayes Hall, Warwickshire. Another junior branch have their seat at Levens Hall, Cumbria.

== Coat of arms ==
Bagot arms: Ermine, two chevronels azure

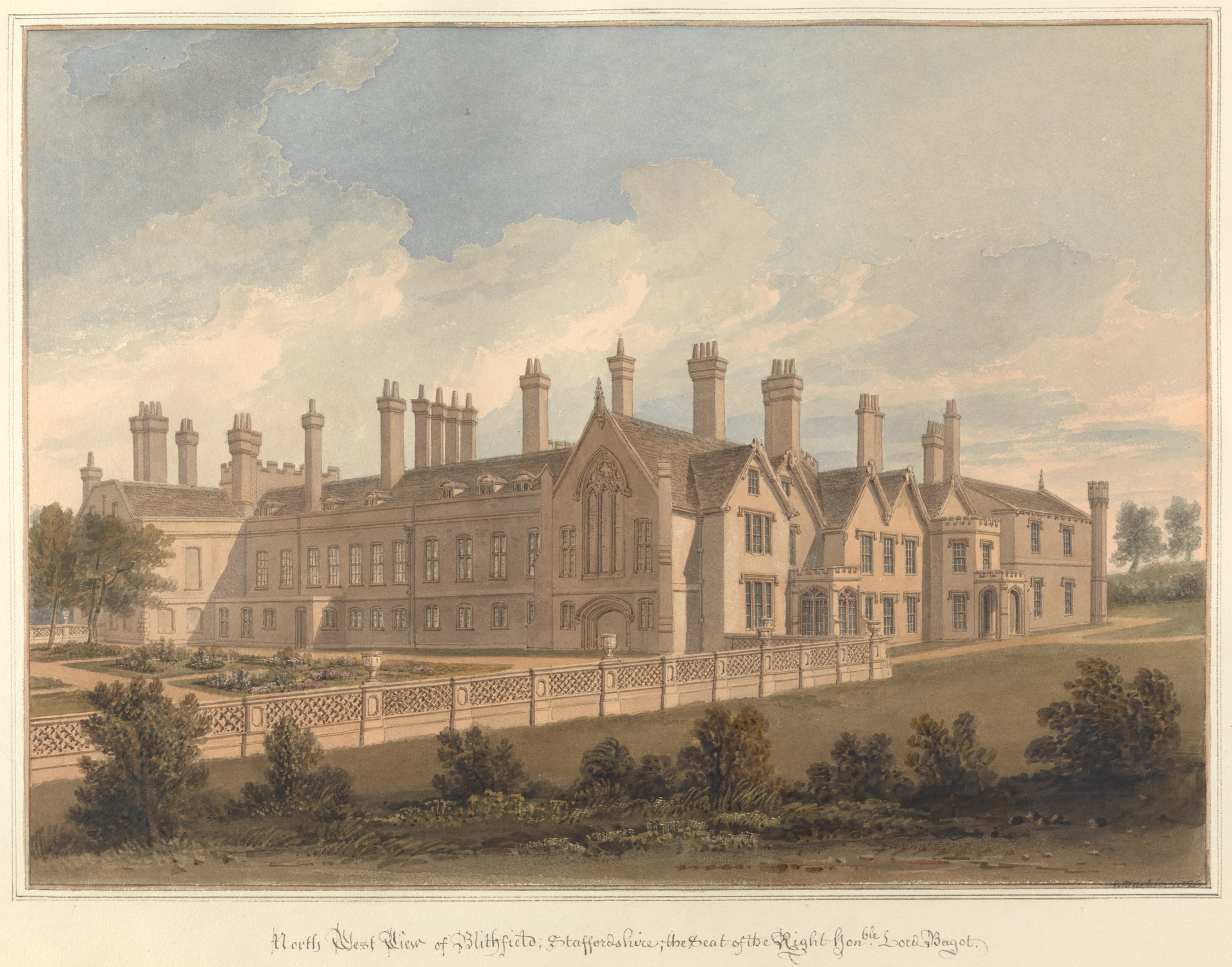
Blithfield Hall, Staffordshire

The heraldic blazon for the coat of arms of the barony is: Ermine, two chevrons azure. This can be translated as: a white shield with black ermine spots, over the top two thin blue chevrons. Crest: out of a ducal coronet of five leaves or, a goat's head argent, armed gold; supporters: two goats argent, armed and bearded or; motto: Antiquum Obtinens "possessing antiquity".

== Bagot baronets, of Blithfield Hall (1627) ==
- Sir Hervey Bagot, 1st Baronet (1591–1660)
- Sir Edward Bagot, 2nd Baronet (1616–1673)
- Sir Walter Bagot, 3rd Baronet (1644–1704)
- Sir Edward Bagot, 4th Baronet (1674–1712)
- Sir Walter Wagstaffe Bagot, 5th Baronet (1702–1768)
- Sir William Bagot, 6th Baronet (1728–1798) (created Baron Bagot in 1780)

=== Barons Bagot (1780) ===
- William Bagot, 1st Baron Bagot (1728–1798)
- William Bagot, 2nd Baron Bagot (1773–1856)
- William Bagot, 3rd Baron Bagot (1811–1887)
- William Bagot, 4th Baron Bagot (1857–1932)
- Gerald William Bagot, 5th Baron Bagot (1866–1946)
- Caryl Ernest Bagot, 6th Baron Bagot (1877–1961)
- Harry Eric Bagot, 7th Baron Bagot (1894–1973)
- Reginald Walter Bagot, 8th Baron Bagot (1897–1979)
- Heneage Charles Bagot, 9th Baron Bagot (1914–2001)
- Charles Hugh Shaun Bagot, 10th Baron Bagot (born 1944)

The heir presumptive is the present holder's third cousin, Julian William D'Arcy Bagot (born 1943).
There are no further heirs to the barony or baronetcy.

=== Male-line family tree ===
Male-line family tree, Bagot baronets and Barons Bagot.

Bagot baronetcy of Blithfield Hall
Sir Hervey Bagot; 1st Baronet; 1591–1660
Sir Edward Bagot; 2nd Baronet; 1616–1673
Sir Walter Bagot; 3rd Baronet; 1644–1704
Sir Edward Bagot; 4th Baronet; 1674–1712
Sir Walter Bagot; 5th Baronet; 1702–1768
Baron Bagot
William Bagot; 1st Baron Bagot; 1728–1798
Edward Bagot; 1763–1773	Walter Bagot; 1766–1773	William Bagot; 2nd Baron Bagot; 1773–1856	Rt Hon. Sir Charles Bagot; 1781–1843	Rt Rev. Hon. Richard Bagot; 1782–1854
William Bagot; 3rd Baron Bagot; 1811–1887	Rev. Hon. Hervey Bagot; 1812–1879	Hon. Alfred Bagot; 1816–1891	Col. Charles Bagot; 1808–1881	George Bagot; 1820–1907	Col. Alexander Bagot; 1822–1874	Maj. Gen. Edward Bagot; 1808–1874	William Bagot; 1809–1810	V. Adm. Henry Bagot; 1810–1877	Rev. Charles Bagot; 1812–1886	Rev. Lewis Bagot; 1813–1870	Maj. George Bagot; 1818–1867	Richard Bagot; 1821–1840	Rev. Frederic Bagot; 1822–1892
William Bagot; 4th Baron Bagot; 1857–1932	Maj. Hon. Walter Bagot; 1864–1927	Maj. Josceline Bagot; 1854–1913	Alan Bagot; 1859–1885	Richard Bagot; 1860–1921	Charles Bagot; 1853–1901	Arthur Bagot; 1856–1906	Francis Bagot; 1858–1861	Lt Col. Ponsonby Bagot; 1845–1921	Lt Col. Villiers Bagot; 1847–1929	Arthur Bagot; 1849–1915	Henry Bagot; 1860–1908	Claud Bagot; 1865–1930	Gerald Bagot; 5th Baron Bagot; 1866–1946	Rev. Lewis Bagot; 1846–1922	Ernest Bagot; 1848–1901	Walter Bagot; 1852–1882	Charles Bagot; 1858–1939	Hugh Bagot; 1860–1919	Cecil Bagot; 1865–1940	Harold Bagot; 1867–1894	Rev. Sidney Bagot; 1873–1933
Bagot baronetcy of Levens Hall
2nd Lt. Edward Bagot; 1896–1916	Sir Alan Bagot; 1st Baronet; 1896–1920	Hervey Bagot; 1885–1886	Lt. Frederic Bagot; 1888–1916	Caryl Bagot; 6th Baron Bagot; 1877–1961	Henry Bagot; 7th Baron Bagot; 1894–1973	Walter Bagot; 8th Baron Bagot; 1897–1979	Heneage Bagot; 9th Baron Bagot; 1914–2001	Lt Col. Charles Bagot; 1912–1986
Baronetcy extinct
Charles Bagot; 10th Baron Bagot born 1944	Richard Bagot; 1941–2015	Julian Bagot born 1943

== Bagot baronets, of Levens Hall (1913) ==
- Sir Alan Bagot, 1st Baronet (1896–1920)

== Other notable Bagots ==
- Sir Charles Bagot (1781–1798), politician, diplomat and colonial administrator, fourth son of the 1st Baron.
- Josceline Bagot (1854–1913), MP for Kendal, grandson of Sir Charles Bagot.
- Rt Rev. Lewis Bagot (1740–1802), fifth son of the 5th Baronet.
- Rt Rev. Richard Bagot (1782–1854), fifth son of the 1st Baron.
- Rev. Walter Bagot (1731–1806), third son of the 5th Baronet.
- Sir William Bagot (died 1407), politician, an ancestral uncle of the 1st Baronet.

== See also ==
- Blithfield Hall
- Bagot baronets
- Bagot goat
- Levens Hall
- Pype Hayes Hall
