= Staffordshire Yeomanry =

- Badge of the Staffordshire Yeomanry
- Active: 1794–2021
- Country: Kingdom of Great Britain (1794–1800); United Kingdom (1801–2021)
- Branch: Territorial Force/Army Reserve
- Type: Yeomanry
- Role: Cavalry/Armour
- Size: 1–3 Regiments
- Part of: Territorial Force; Royal Armoured Corps
- Engagements: Second Boer War; World War I Egypt 1915–17 Palestine 1917–18 World War II Syria 1941 North Africa 1942–43 North-West Europe 1944–45
- Battle honours: See battle honours below

Commanders
- Notable commanders: George Leveson-Gower, 1st Duke of Sutherland; Edward Monckton; Thomas Anson, 1st Earl of Lichfield; William Bagot, 3rd Baron Bagot; Sir William Bromley-Davenport

The Staffordshire Yeomanry (Queen's Own Royal Regiment) was a mounted auxiliary unit of the British Army raised in 1794 to defend Great Britain from foreign invasion. It continued in service after the Napoleonic Wars, frequently being called out in support of the civil powers. It first sent units overseas at the time of the Second Boer War and saw distinguished service in Egypt and Palestine in World War I. During World War II it gave up its horses and became a tank regiment, serving in the Western Desert and landing in Normandy on D-Day. Postwar the Staffordshire Yeomanry became part of the Queen's Own Mercian Yeomanry with one of the squadrons being designated 'Staffordshire Yeomanry' until 2021.

== French Revolutionary and Napoleonic Wars ==
After Britain was drawn into the French Revolutionary Wars, Prime Minister William Pitt the Younger proposed on 14 March 1794 that the counties should form a force of Volunteer Yeoman Cavalry (Yeomanry) that could be called on by the King to defend the country against invasion or by the Lord Lieutenant to subdue any civil disorder within the county. By the end of the year 27 counties had raised Yeomanry, including Staffordshire. The first Troop in the county was raised on 4 July 1794 at the Swan Inn, Stafford, as the Stafford Troop of the Staffordshire Volunteer Cavalry and gained official recognition on 21 August. The leading figure in raising it was Francis Perceval Eliot of Elmhurst Hall, former captain in the 14th Foot. Soon there were five Troops or 'Divisions' in the county, which were loosely regimented on 20 September as the Staffordshire Regiment of Gentlemen and Yeomanry (one of the first counties to be regimented):

- Newcastle-under-Lyme, commanded by Colonel Earl Gower
- Stafford, commanded by lieutenant-colonel the Hon Edward Monckton
- Lichfield, commanded by Major Francis Eliot
- Leek, commanded by Capt James Bulkeley
- Walsall, commanded by Capt William Tennant

The regiment was first employed when the Stafford Troop was called out on 6 August 1795 in support of the civil power in suppressing bread rioters who had intercepted a consignment of corn at Radford Bridge on the Staffordshire and Worcestershire Canal; the rioters were dispersed without bloodshed.

In 1798 the Staffordshire Yeomanry was fully regimented, and the troops were no longer independent. By now the threat of invasion seemed more acute, and the government encouraged the formation of local armed associations of cavalry and infantry for purely local defence. A number of these volunteer associations were formed in Staffordshire and accepted:

- Loyal Pottery Volunteer Cavalry, raised 21 May 1798 in Hanley, as the cavalry division of the Loyal Staffordshire Pottery Association of Hanley, Shelton and Stoke-on-Trent, commanded by Capt Josiah Spode
- Walsall Loyal Volunteer Cavalry, raised 31 May 1798 initially as part of the Walsall Loyal Volunteer Association, later independent as the Loyal Walsall Light Dragoons, commanded by Capt John Scott
- Tamworth Volunteer Association Cavalry, raised 6 July 1798, commanded by Capt Thomas B. Paget
- Needwood Troop of Volunteer Cavalry, raised 6 June 1798, commanded by Capt Richard Meek
- Stone Gentlemen and Yeomanry, of the Stone Volunteer Association, raised 6 June 1798, commanded by Capt George Steedman
- Loyal Handsworth Association, raised (as cavalry only) 14 June 1798, commanded by Capt Nathaniel Gooding Clarke
- Loyal Bilston Cavalry, of the Loyal Bilston Association, raised 18 June 1798, commanded by Capt Thomas Loxdale
- Loyal Wolverhampton Cavalry of the Wolverhampton Loyal Volunteer Association:
  - Wolverhampton Troop, raised 19 June 1798, commanded by Capt George Molineux
  - Tettenhall Troop, recruited across seven outlying parishes, first meeting 28 June 1798, commanded by Capt Francis Edward Holyoake

Other than their more limited obligations, there was little difference between the mounted volunteers and the Yeomanry.

Earl Gower resigned the command of the Staffordshire Yeomanry in March 1800 and Lt-Col Monckton was promoted to succeed him. That year there were frequent disorders, and the Stafford and Newcastle Troops were regularly called out. Lord Bradford raised a sixth troop for the Yeomanry at Weston in October 1800 and was appointed its captain.

Most volunteer cavalry was disbanded after the Treaty of Amiens in March 1802, including the Needwood Troop and the Wolverhampton Association, but the Staffordshire Yeomanry continued in existence. The peace was short-lived, and many volunteer troops were reformed or newly formed when war broke out again in 1803, including the following Staffordshire units:

- Teddesley Troop of the Staffordshire Yeomanry raised in 1803 by Sir Edward Littleton, 4th Baronet, of Teddesley Hall, recruited mainly from Penkridge and Wolverhampton, and commanded by his brother-in-law Capt Moreton Walhouse of Hatheron Hall
- Bilston Volunteer Cavalry, reformed December 1803, under Capt William Smith Bickley from November 1804; became a troop of the Staffordshire Yeomanry in June 1805
- Handsworth Volunteer Cavalry, continued as an independent troop from 1798 to the 1820s
- Staffordshire Pottery Cavalry, reformed 1803 under the command of Capt S.G. Simpson; became a troop of the Staffordshire Yeomanry in October 1803, but disbanded shortly afterwards
- Stone and Eccleshall Volunteer Cavalry
- Tamworth Volunteer Cavalry
- Uttoxeter Cavalry raised in 1803, commanded by Capt the Hon Claude Bagot
- Wolverhampton Troop offered to reform in 1803 but not accepted

The regiment was regularly trained and inspected, collectively or by troops, over the following years. In 1809, 13 days' regimental training was carried out at Derby. On 30 May 1810 there was a riot at Wolverhampton Market, and the Bilston Troop was called out to assist the magistrates and the Western Regiment, Staffordshire Local Militia, to suppress the trouble. Next day the Teddesley and Weston Troops arrived, but were not required. In 1813 it was proposed that the independent troops of Volunteer Cavalry should be incorporated into the Yeomanry regiment, and the Stone & Eccleshall, Uttoxeter and Tamworth Troops accepted. The war ended in 1814 and the Stone & Eccleshall Troop was disbanded shortly afterwards, having engaged only for the duration of the war; the Uttoxeter Troop also disbanded, except for 20 men who transferred to the Lichfield Troop. On 1 December 1814 the strength of the regiment was 428 men. The Newcastle-under-Lyme Volunteers (originally a full regiment of infantry) was attached to the Staffordshire Yeomanry, but was never called out and was disbanded in 1820.

== 19th century ==
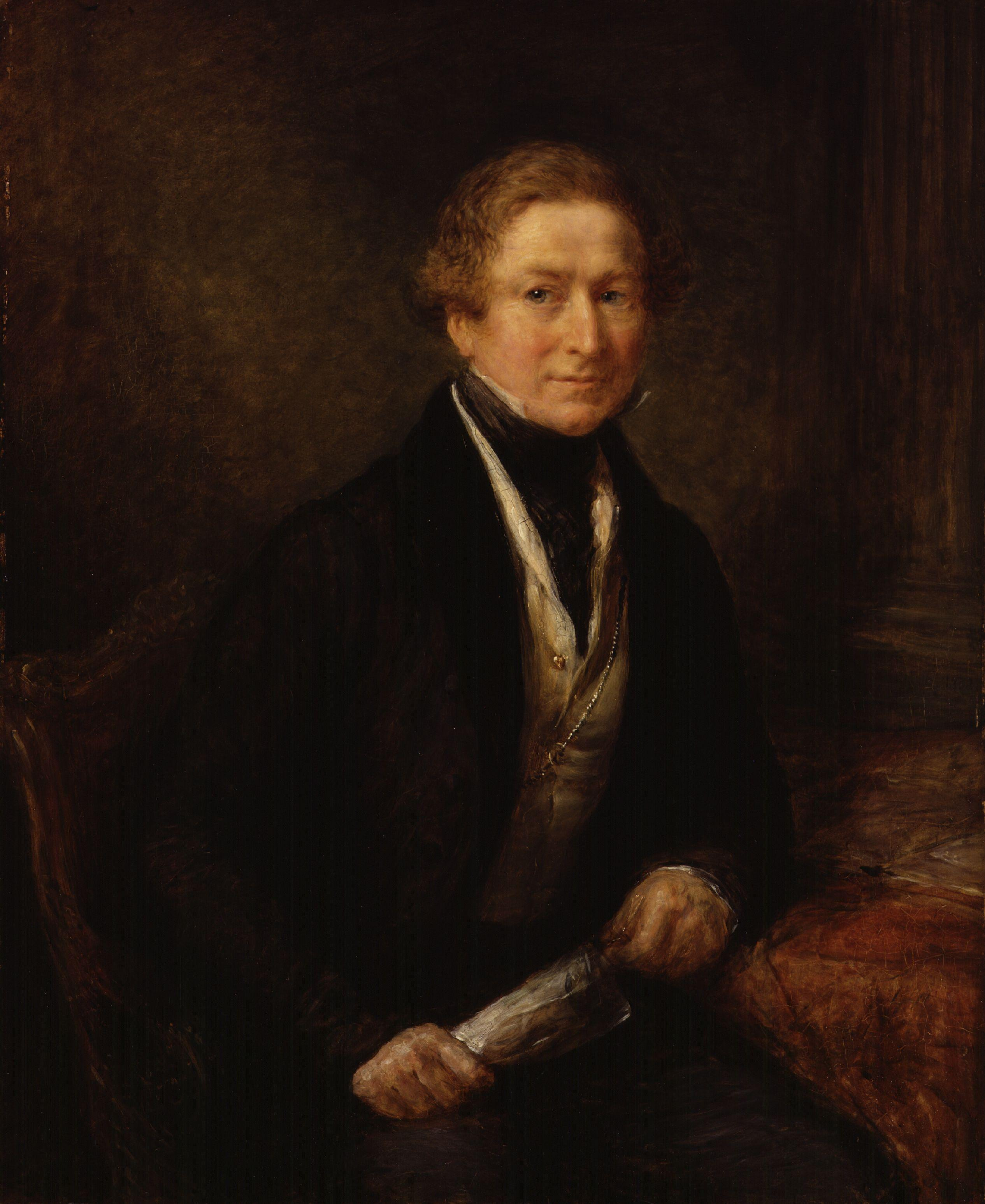
Portrait of Sir Robert Peel by John Linnell

The Yeomanry generally declined in importance and strength after the end of the French wars, but this was not the case in industrial areas such as the Black Country and the Potteries where there was social unrest. The Staffordshire Yeomanry was regularly called out in support of the civil power twice in the years after the Battle of Waterloo, first on 14–18 November 1815 when Wolverhampton and Bilston ironworkers and coal miners rioted. The peacetime establishment of the Staffordshire Yeomanry was fixed at eight troops of 60 men in March 1816, and the regiment was re-clothed and re-equipped, 12 men per troop being issued with Light Dragoon pattern Carbines. While undergoing this reorganisation, the regiment was unable to assist the magistrates with a disturbance at Walsall in October, but the independent Handsworth Volunteer Cavalry did the duty. The Leek Troop intercepted the 'Blanket March' to Manchester in March 1817. The continued disturbances led to the regiment being expanded to 12 troops with 838 men enlisted by the end of 1819:

- Stafford & Cheadle (1794)
- Lichfield (1794)
- Leek (1794)
- Walsall (1794)
- Weston (1800)
- Teddesley (1803)
- Bilston (1805)
- Tamworth (1813)
- Newcastle & Pottery (1817)
- Burton (1819)
- Uttoxeter & Blithfield (1819)
- Himley & Enville (1819)

Future Prime Minister Robert Peel was commissioned as a lieutenant in the Uttoxeter Troop on 2 January 1820; he had left by the time he entered the Cabinet as Home Secretary in 1822, but several of his relatives served in the regiment. In 1823 the Bilston Troop was renamed the Sandwell Troop when Capt Yates succeeded Capt Bickley in command, but was disbanded in December 1826 due to lack of recruits. The Weston and Leek Trps were also disbanded in March 1827 and December 1829 respectively; the independent Handsworth Volunteer Cavalry was disbanded in 1827. Colonel Monckton, aged 86, resigned the command in December 1829 and Lt-Col Edward Littleton, MP, was appointed Lt-Col Commandant. The Teddesley Trp under Capt Hordern was renamed the Wolverhampton Trp in January 1832.

=== Aid to the civil power ===
The Staffordshire Yeomanry was called out on the following occasions:

- November 1820: Himley Trp called out as a precaution in case of trouble at Dudley
- April–May 1822: South Staffordshire mining unrest; Himley Trp on duty for 23 days, others for shorter periods
- 1823: Election riots at Newcastle-under-Lyme after the death of the MP, Capt Wiliam Shepherd Kinnersley of the Newcastle Trp; Stafford Trp also attended
- 1826: Coal miners' wage riots at West Bromwich and Wednesbury; Walsall, Sandwell and Himley Trps called out
- 1826: Election riots at Stafford
- 1831: Miners' riots in the Potteries
- June 1831: Prevention of looting at Tutbury; Burton Trp called out
- October 1831: Great Reform Act riots at Derby; Uttoxeter and Burton Trps called out
- November 1831: riots at Wolverhampton
- July 1837: Election riots in the Potteries; Newcastle, Stafford and Uttoxeter Trps deployed
- January 1839: firefighting at Walsall
- May–August 1839: Chartist riots in the Potteries and at Birmingham; whole regiment deployed by successive troops
- April–August 1842: Miners' riots in the Potteries and South Staffordshire; Troops embodied for an average of 22 days' service each, the Himley Trp completing 50 days

=== Queen's Own Royal Yeomanry ===
In 1832 the regiment escorted the Duchess of Kent and her daughter Princess Victoria when they visited Lt-Col Thomas Anson, 1st Earl of Lichfield (the regiment's second-in-command), at Shugborough Hall. Lieutenant-Col Littleton resigned the command in August 1833 when he became Chief Secretary for Ireland and the Earl of Lichfield was appointed Lt-Col Cmdt in his place. After Princess Victoria ascended the throne as Queen Victoria, the regiment was given the title of Queen's Own Royal Regiment of Staffordshire Yeomanry Cavalry (often referred to as the Queen's Own Royal Yeomanry (QORY)) on 12 February 1838 in commemoration of her earlier visit. In 1840 Lord Paget succeeded to the command of the Burton Trp and obtained permission for it to be renamed the Anglesey Troop in honour of his grandfather Henry Paget, 1st Marquess of Anglesey. After the regiment's service in the disturbances of 1842 it was decided to raise an additional troop in the Moorland area of north-east Staffordshire: enthusiasm was so great that a full squadron was raised, with troops at Cheadle and Leek. In 1844 the regiment was issued with percussion carbines in place of the old flintlock pistols.

By 1850 the regiment consisted of 11 troops in six squadrons, a total of 892 all ranks, making it the largest yeomanry regiment in the country. The Earl of Lichfield was still in command, and after Lt-Col Edward Monckton (son of the former colonel) died in 1848 there was a series of promotions: Edmund Peel, MP, was second lt-col and the Hon William Bagot and Earl Granville were the majors; the colonel's son, Viscount Anson and Sir Francis Scott, 3rd Baronet were among the captains. Edmund Peel was the former prime minister's younger brother; Sir Robert's younger son Frederick Peel, MP, was also a lieutenant in the regiment. Major Bagot (now Lord Bagot) was promoted in 1851 after Lt-Col Peel died, and then became commanding officer (CO) when the Earl of Lichfield in turn died in 1854.

The regiment had been called out in 1848 during the great Chartist demonstration in London, but there were no disturbances at the meetings in Staffordshire. However, in March 1855 there were miners' riots in the Potteries and the regiment was deployed to suppress them. The regiment patrolled the streets of Wolverhampton in February 1867 during an Anti-Papist meeting, but there was no trouble. This was the last occasion on which the regiment was employed in aid of the civil power.

=== Reorganisation ===
New Yeomanry Regulations came into force in April 1871, setting the establishment of a regiment at eight troops of 60 men, but as one of the strongest-recruited units the Staffordshire Yeomanry obtained a special dispensation to continue its 12 troops. It was also issued with Westley Richards breechloading carbines. Lord Bagot retired from the command in 1874 and was appointed the regiment's first honorary colonel, Lt-Col William Bromley-Davenport, MP, succeeding to the command.

Following the Cardwell Reforms a mobilisation scheme began to appear in the Army List from December 1875. This assigned Regular and Yeomanry units places in an order of battle of corps, divisions and brigades for the 'Active Army', even though these formations were entirely theoretical, with no staff or services assigned. The Staffordshire Yeomanry were assigned as 'divisional troops' to 1st Division of III Corps based at Croydon, Surrey, alongside Regular Army units of infantry, artillery and engineers. By now, the regiment had expanded to 12 Troops with regimental headquarters (RHQ) at Lichfield. The strength on 1 December 1875 was stated to be 495 out of an establishment of 599. The regiment was issued with the Snider carbine in 1881, replaced by the Martini–Henry carbine in 1885 and the Martini–Metford carbine in 1896. Colonel Bromley-Davenport died during the 1884 training and Lt-Col Henry Paget, 4th Marquess of Anglesey, succeeded to the command. The Tamworth Trp had been disbanded in 1882 due to falling numbers; it was followed by the Leek Trp in 1889 (when 18 men over the age of 50 were forcibly retired) and the Cheadle Trp in 1892, leaving the regiment with nine troops, in addition to the band, ambulance and signal sections.

Yeomanry regiments were reorganised into permanent squadrons in January 1893, when the Staffordshires adopted the following organisation:

- RHQ – Yeomanry House, Lichfield, moving to the Friary, Lichfield, in 1895
- A Squadron – Lichfield and Walsall Trps
- B Squadron – Newcastle and Stafford Trps
- C Squadron – Anglesey (or Burton) and Uttoxeter Trps
- D Squadron – Himley and Wolverhampton Trps

The 1875 mobilisation scheme had never been more than a paper organisation, but now the Yeomanry regiments were grouped into brigades for collective training. They were commanded by the senior regimental CO but they did have a Regular Army Brigade major. The Staffordshire Yeomanry together with the Warwickshire Yeomanry formed the 8th Yeomanry Brigade in the 4th Division of Auxiliary Cavalry.

The Prince of Wales visited Lichfield for the regiment's centenary in 1894, when he was entertained at Elmhurst Hall, former home of the regiment's founder, Francis Eliot, by the commanding officer, Cromartie Sutherland-Leveson-Gower, 4th Duke of Sutherland, great-grandson of the first CO.

== Imperial Yeomanry ==
=== Second Boer War ===
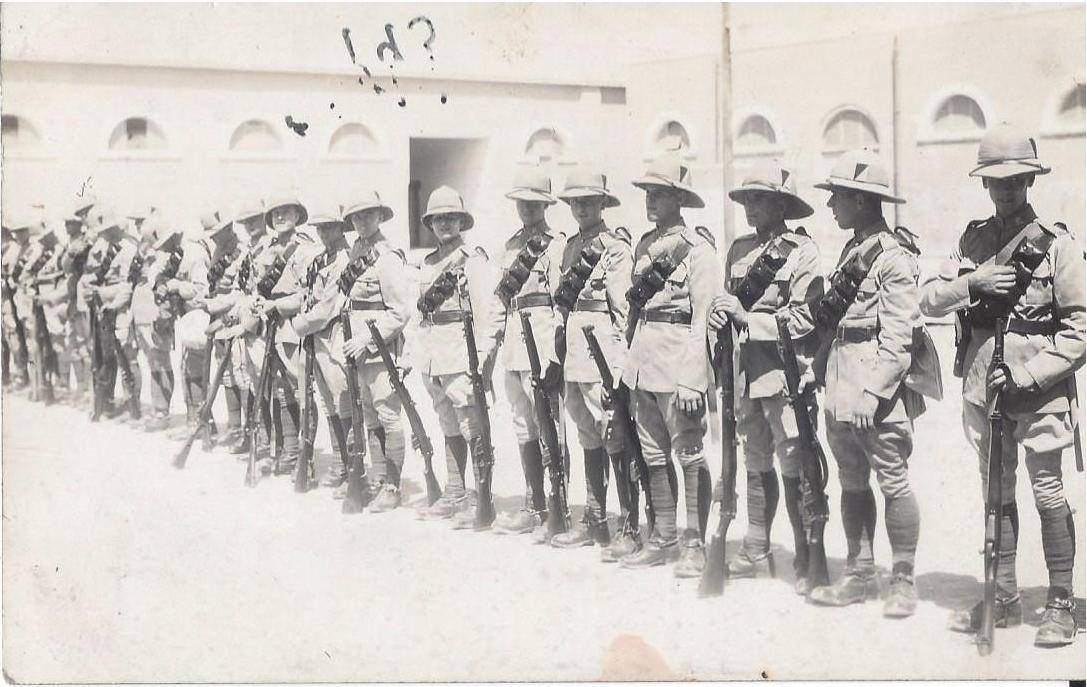
Staffordshire Yeomanry at ease

The Yeomanry was not intended to serve overseas, but due to the string of defeats during Black Week in December 1899, the British government realised that it was going to need more troops than just the regular army. A Royal Warrant was issued on 24 December 1899 to allow volunteer forces to serve in South Africa. The Royal Warrant asked standing Yeomanry regiments to provide service companies of approximately 115 men each for the Imperial Yeomanry. The new force was equipped to operate as Mounted infantry (MI), armed with a Lee–Metford infantry rifle and bayonet instead of a cavalry carbine and sabre.

In January 1900 the Staffordshire Yeomanry quickly raised 6th (Staffordshire) Company, IY, commanded by Capt William Bromley-Davenport, MP (son of the regiment's former colonel), comprising four officers and 64 yeomen, together with 50 civilians and members of the Volunteers, who were specially enlisted in the regiment. The company sailed from Liverpool on 21 February and on arrival in South Africa it formed part of 4th Battalion, IY, commanded by Col F.G. Blair of the Leicestershire Yeomanry.

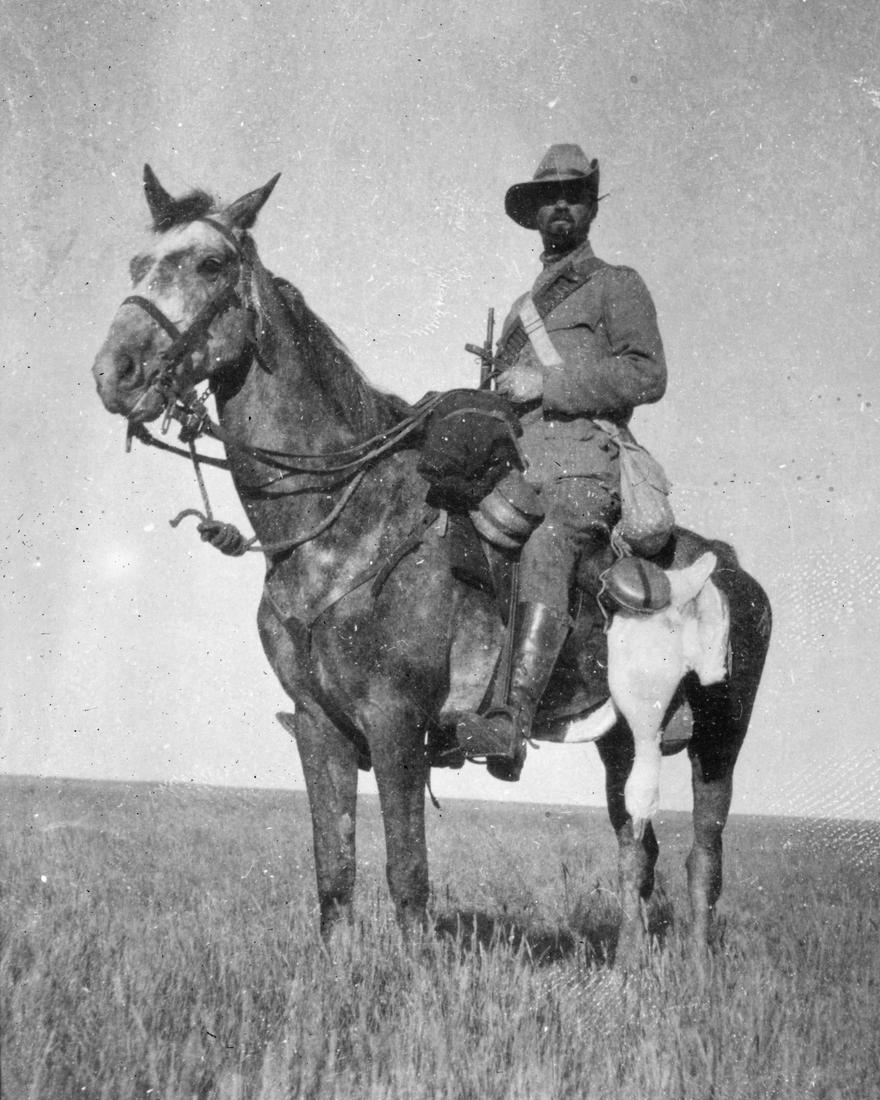
A typical Imperial Yeoman on campaign

On 4 March the 4th was sent with other IY battalions to Naauwpoort, and by 19 April it had joined Lieutenant-General Sir Leslie Rundle's 8th Division ('Rundle's Column') concentrating at Rosendal in the Orange Free State. Next day Rundle advanced on Dewetsdorp with the 4th and other IY and MI battalions as a covering force, followed by the infantry and artillery. As they advanced the Boer scouts fell back to their main position on a Kopje to the north. The MI and guns attacked the kopje, while the IY tried to work round the flank, but the action ended inconclusively. Three days of desultory firing followed before reinforcements arrived, when the Boers fled. In the pursuit the IY were used fo wide turning movements. In the next operation Rundle's force was ordered to advance north on a wide front to sweep up the Boers in his path as the army advanced on Bloemfontein.

Over the following months the 6th (Staffordshire) Company carried out hard service. During the course of the campaign Capt Bromley-Davenport was promoted to command 4th Bn as acting Lt-Col and Capt T.A. Wight–Boycott of the Staffs Yeomanry became the battalion's major; both were awarded the Distinguished Service Order (DSO). When the company completed its service in May 1901, only half of the company was mustered, despite a draft of reinforcements having been received. Three members of the contingent had died from wounds received in action, and 11 from disease; one officer and 50 men had been invalided. Six yeomen had received commissions and four had joined the police in South Africa. Some 60 men embarked at Cape Town and arrived at Southampton on 8 June.

Meanwhile, a second contingent had been sent to South Africa to replace 6th Company, and a new 106th (Staffordshire) Company had also been sent out to join 4th Bn. However, the Second Contingent of yeomanry were generally not as well selected or trained as the first, and the battalions had to undergo much 'weeding' and reorganisation after their arrival in April before they were ready for service. 4th Battalion was still with Rundle's division, attached to 16th Brigade at Bethlehem. The force provided escorts and cover for the working parties constructing blockhouse lines. After the 11th Bn IY were overrun at the disastrous Battle of Groenkop or Tweefontein on 25 December, 4th Bn went out with a mounted column under Maj-Gen Edward Locke Elliot that pursued the Boers and almost caught them at Armstrong Drift on 28 December but were foiled by night falling. For two more days they pursued, but the Boers got away and the British column had to return for supplies. The two Staffordshire companies spent the rest of the war trekking over South Africa, taking part in 'drives' to round up Boers. After the Treaty of Vereeniging on 31 May 1902, they embarked for home in July, arriving in England in August.

The service of these two companies earned the Staffordshire Yeomanry its first Battle honour: South Africa 1900–01.

=== Staffordshire Imperial Yeomanry ===
The Imperial Yeomanry concept was considered a success and before the war ended the existing Yeomanry regiments at home were converted into Imperial Yeomanry, with an establishment of RHQ and four squadrons with a machine gun section. The regiment was redesignated the Staffordshire Imperial Yeomanry (Queen's Own Royal Regiment) in May 1901.

In 1905 RHQ and the regimental stores moved from the Friary at Lichfield to 38 Tamworth Street, Lichfield. Annual training was usually carried out at Trentham Park outside Stoke. Colonel Sir Reginald Hardy resigned the command of the regiment on 13 March 1906 and was succeeded by Lt-Col A.H. Heath, with Lt-Col Bromley-Davenport as second-in-command.

== Territorial Force ==
The Imperial Yeomanry were subsumed into the new Territorial Force (TF) under the Haldane Reforms of 1908. On 1 April 1908 the regiment was redesignated as the Staffordshire Yeomanry (Queen's Own Royal Regiment) (TF) affiliated to Hussars, with the following organisation:

- RHQ moved in 1914 from Tamworth Street, Lichfield, to Friars' Walk Drill Hall, Bailey Street, Stafford (shared with 6th Staffordshire Battery, Royal Field Artillery)
- A Sqn at Walsall, with detachments at Carters Green, West Bromwich (shared with 5th Staffordshire Battery, Royal Field Artillery); Tamworth; Frog Lane, Lichfield (shared with E Company, 6th Bn North Staffordshire Regiment, with Yeomanry also at Holly House, Lombard Street, in the town); and Sutton Coldfield
- B Sqn at Stoke-on-Trent with detachments at Stafford, Leek, Cannock and Newcastle-under-Lyme
- C Sqn at Burton-on-Trent, with a detachment at High Street, Uttoxeter
- D Sqn at Stafford Street Drill Hall, Wolverhampton (shared with 3rd North Midland Brigade, Royal Field Artillery and 6th Bn, South Staffordshire Regiment), with a detachment at Himley

The regiment formed part of the TF's North Midland Mounted Brigade. Lieutenant-Col Heath retired in April 1910 and Lt-Col Bromley-Davenport succeeded to the command.

== World War I ==
=== Mobilisation ===
When war was declared on 4 August 1914, the Staffordshire Yeomanry mobilised at Stafford under the command of Lt-Col Bromley-Davenport The regiment assembled with the North Midland Mounted Brigade (NMMB) and then went with it to its war station at Diss in Norfolk, where it came under 1st Mounted Division.

In accordance with the Territorial and Reserve Forces Act 1907 (7 Edw. 7, c.9) which brought the TF into being, it was intended to be a home defence force for service during wartime and members could not be compelled to serve outside the country. However, on 10 August 1914 the TF was invited to volunteer for overseas service. On 15 August the War Office issued instructions to separate those men who had signed up for Home Service only, and form these into reserve units. On 31 August, the formation of a reserve or 2nd Line unit was authorised for each 1st Line unit where 60 per cent or more of the men had volunteered for Overseas Service. The titles of these 2nd Line units would be the same as the original, but distinguished by a '2/' prefix. In this way duplicate battalions, brigades and divisions were created, mirroring those TF formations being sent overseas. Later, the 2nd Line was prepared for overseas service and a 3rd Line was formed to act as a reserve, providing trained replacements for the 1st and 2nd Line regiments.

=== 1/1st Staffordshire Yeomanry ===
After more than a year training in Norfolk, 1/1st Staffs Yeomanry was ordered to complete to full war establishment in September 1915, and the following month embarked with 1/1st NMMB for the Mediterranean. The advance party went to Mudros, the base for the Gallipoli campaign, but the rest of the regiment was ordered to the Salonika Front, then finally was disembarked in Egypt. There 1/1st NMMB became 22nd Mounted Brigade and was sent to join the Western Frontier Force. In December 1916 the brigade joined the Yeomanry Mounted Division in the Egyptian Expeditionary Force (EEF) for the advance into Palestine. It fought in all three battles of Gaza and the Battle of Mughar Ridge. At the Battle of Nebi Samwil and the subsequent Turkish counter-attacks during November 1917 men and horses suffered from the terrible conditions in the Judaean Hills.

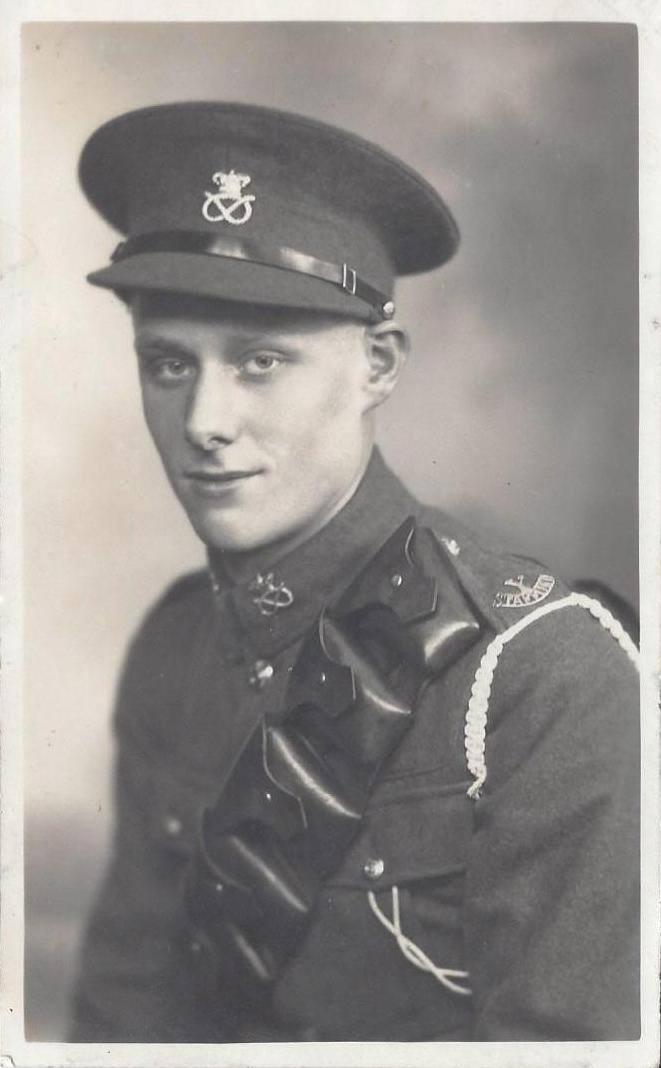
William H. Richardson of the Staffordshire Yeomanry.

The 1/1st Staffs Yeomanry was detached to the Imperial Camel Brigade for operations in the Jordan Valley in April and May 1918 while the Yeomanry Mounted Division was reorganised into 4th Cavalry Division. 1/1st Staffordshire Yeomanry was now the sole British unit with two Indian cavalry regiments constituting 12th Cavalry Brigade. 4th Cavalry Division then undertook a tour of duty in the malarial Jordan Valley during the height of summer, with 1/1st Staffs Yeomanry having to evacuate many casualties suffering from sickness. In September the division secretly moved to the coast with the Desert Mounted Corps (DMC) under the Australian General Harry Chauvel for the Battle of Megiddo. After the opening infantry assault the division broke through with little opposition, and took part in Chauvel's strategic cavalry 'bound', riding 70 miles (110 km) in 34 hours to participate in the Capture of Afulah and Beisan, taking hundreds of prisoners. After a few days' rest, 4th Cavalry Division set off again, linking up with the Arab Northern Army to capture Deraa and then advancing up the Pilgrims' Road to take part in the DMC's encirclement and Capture of Damascus on 1 October. Since 15 September the 1/1st Staffs Yeomanry had marched 233 miles (375 km) and captured 3069 prisoners.

Ravaged by malaria caught in the Jordan Valley (the 1/1st Staffs Yeomanry having been reduced to just 75 men, 200 of them having become casualties), 4th Cavalry Division was too exhausted to keep up in the DMC's final 200 miles (320 km) advance to Aleppo, which fell to the EEF on 26 October. Hostilities ended five days later with the Armistice of Mudros. The 1/1st Staffs Yeomanry remained as part of the Army of Occupation until 19 December 1919 when it was reduced to a cadre in Egypt and disembodied soon afterwards.

=== 2/1st Staffordshire Yeomanry ===
The 2nd Line regiment was formed in 1914. In 1915, it joined the 2/1st North Midland Mounted Brigade. In October, the brigade replaced the 1/1st NMMB in the 1st Mtd Division in Norfolk. On 31 March 1916, the remaining Mounted Brigades were ordered to be numbered in a single sequence and the brigade became the 3rd Mounted Brigade.

In July 1916, there was a major reorganization of 2nd Line yeomanry units in the United Kingdom. All but 12 regiments were converted to cyclists and as a consequence the regiment was dismounted and joined the 3rd Cyclist Brigade (and the division became 1st Cyclist Division) in the Holt area.

A further reorganisation in November 1916 saw the 1st Cyclist Division broken up and the regiment was remounted along with the rest of the brigade, which was redesignated as the new 2nd Mounted Brigade in the new 1st Mounted Division (originally 3rd Mounted Division) at Stansted. By May 1917, it was at Leybourne near West Malling in Kent.

The regiment was once again converted to cyclists in August 1917 and joined 12th Cyclist Brigade in The Cyclist Division. By the end of 1917, it was at Tonbridge and then to Canterbury where it remained until the end of the war. 2/1st Staffordshire Yeomanry began disbanding in March 1919 at Canterbury.

=== 3/1st Staffordshire Yeomanry ===
The 3rd Line regiment was formed in 1915 and in the summer it was affiliated to a Reserve Cavalry Regiment at Aldershot. In the summer of 1916, it was affiliated to 12th Reserve Cavalry Regiment also at Aldershot. Early in 1917, the regiment was absorbed into the 3rd Reserve Cavalry Regiment still at Aldershot.

== Between the wars ==
Postwar, a commission was set up to consider the shape of the Territorial Force (Territorial Army from 1 October 1921). The experience of World War I made it clear that there was a surplus of cavalry. The commission decided that only the 14 most senior regiments were to be retained as cavalry, the remainder would be converted to other roles such as armoured cars or artillery. As the 5th most senior regiment in the order of precedence, the Staffordshire Yeomanry was retained as horsed cavalry.

By the later 1930s the policy was to mechanise all remaining cavalry units, but the TA was at the bottom of the priority list for modern equipment, and this had still not been done for the Yeomanry when World War II broke out.

Prior to World War II, the Staffs Yeomanry formed part of 6th Cavalry Brigade, a TA formation in Western Command, together with the Warwickshire Yeomanry and the Cheshire Yeomanry.

== World War II ==
The Staffordshire Yeomanry mobilised at its headquarters at Wolverhampton on 1 September 1939. On 31 October, 6th Cavalry Bde became part of a reformed 1st Cavalry Division. There was clearly no role for cavalry in the mechanised warfare anticipated in Europe, so 1st Cavalry Division was sent to perform security duties in Mandatory Palestine, where they could still be effective, and would release other troops for the main fighting fronts.

=== Middle East ===
6th Cavalry Bde arrived in Palestine on 9 January 1940, followed by the rest of the division. Over the next year it carried out internal security, quelling disturbances between Palestinians and Jewish settlers, and planned for mechanisation. Initially this was as motorised infantry mounted in 15-hundredweight trucks, though the five senior yeomanry regiments in the division (the Staffordshire being 5th) had been selected to be converted to armour when tanks became available. The Staffordshire Yeomanry officially became part of the Royal Armoured Corps from 12 April 1941.

In April 1941, elements of 1st Cavalry Division were sent to fight in the short Anglo-Iraqi War; the rest, including parts of 6th Cavalry Bde, were then sent to fight Vichy French forces in the Syria–Lebanon campaign in June and July. The Staffs Yeomanry were later awarded the Battle honour 'Syria 1941'.

Back in Palestine, mechanisation continued: 1st Cavalry Division and 6th Cavalry Bde were redesignated 10th Armoured Division and 8th Armoured Bde respectively on 1 August 1941. In February 1942 the brigade moved to Egypt and began desert training with tanks.

=== Western Desert ===
During the crisis of the Battle of Gazala in June the 8th Armoured Bde was sent up to join Eighth Army, but on arrival it was ordered to hand over its tanks to experienced units and return to Egypt. It was finally re-equipped and took its place in the line for the defensive Battle of Alam el Halfa on 30 August. After further training the brigade attacked during the Second Battle of El Alamein (23 October–4 November) and then took part in the subsequent pursuit.

When 10th Armoured Division HQ was ordered back to Egypt, 8th Armoured Brigade was left behind as an independent formation. At the end of November it came under the command of the 7th Armoured Division, the famous Desert Rats and was involved in the battles around El Agheila and the pursuit to Tripoli.

=== Tunisia ===
The regiment took part in the Battle of the Mareth Line, participating in the New Zealand Corps' 'left hook' to penetrate the Tebaga Gap and outflank the defences, engaging the enemy at 'Roman Wall' and later helping to defeat a German counter-attack. 8th Armoured Bde was then in action at Wadi Akarit and Enfidaville, supporting 2nd New Zealand Division in its attack on the hilltop village of Takrouna. Although the terran was too rough for its tanks to participate in the final advance on Tunis, the surrender of the Italian commander was negotiated via the wireless on the Staffs Yeomanry's command tank. (Note: The Staffordshire Yeomanry was awarded the battle honours 'El Hamma', 'Sebkret en Noual' and 'Djebel el Telil' for actions around the Mareth Line and Wadi Akarit.)

After fall of Tunis 8th Armoured Bde returned to Egypt and was not employed in the invasions of Sicily or Italy. It was then selected with other veteran formations to return to the UK to prepare for the planned Allied invasion of Normandy (Operation Overlord).

=== Invasion of Normandy ===
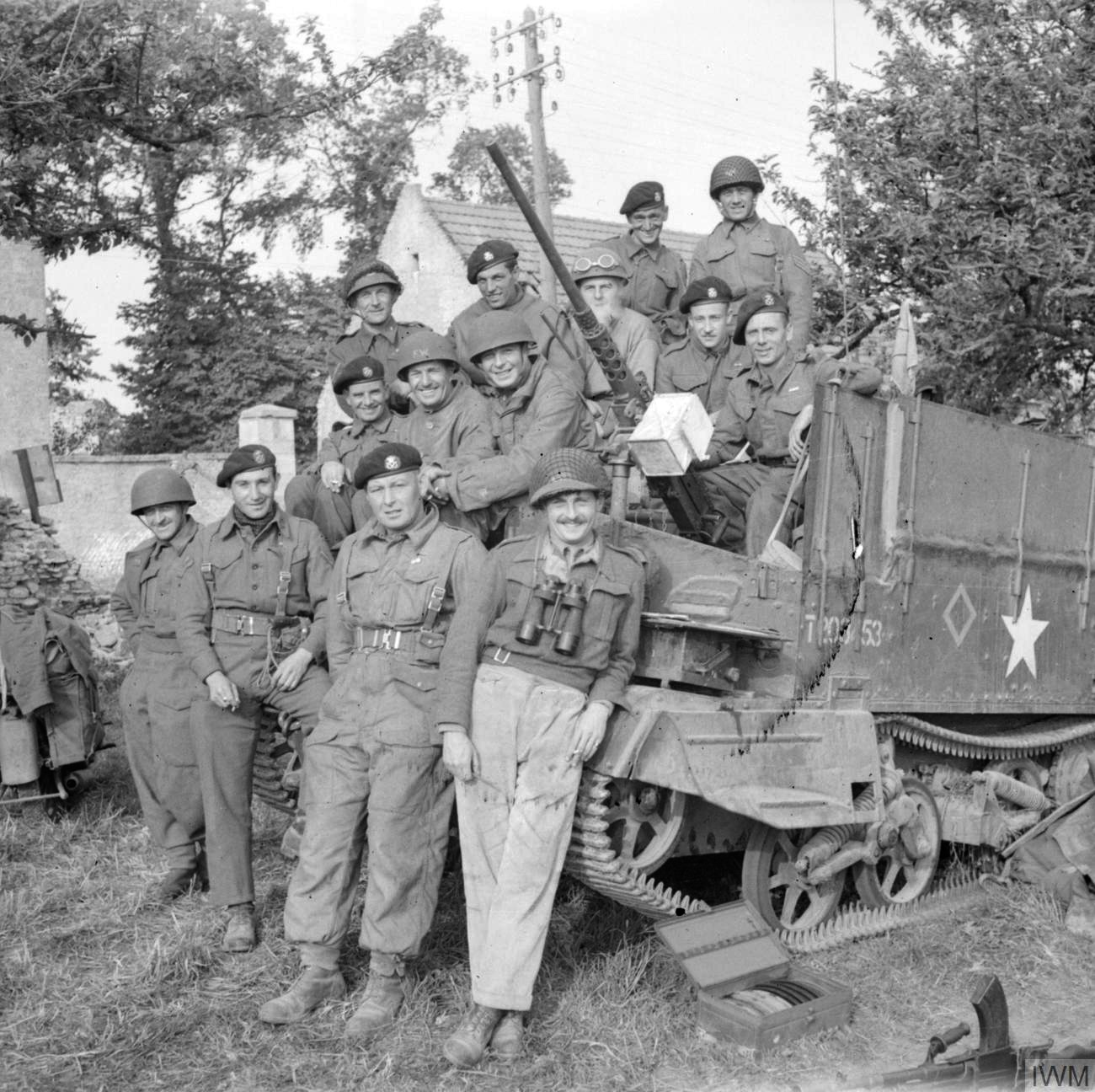
Men of the Staffordshire Yeomanry crowd in and around a universal carrier for a portrait, 7 June 1944. The vehicle is equipped with a .50-inch Browning machine gun, 7 June 1944.

On 13 February 1944 the regiment transferred to 27th Armoured Bde, which had not seen action since the Dunkirk evacuation. As part of British Second Army, commanded by Lieutenant-General Sir Miles Dempsey, 27th Armoured Bde had been selected to land with amphibious DD tanks on Sword Beach in support of 3rd Division, and had been training in the Moray Firth. However, there was a shortage of DD Shermans, so the Staffs Yeomanry was equipped with conventional Shermans and 17-pounder armed Sherman Fireflies to be landed from Landing craft tank (LCTs) directly onto the beach.

The Staffordshire Yeomanry began landing at H+90 minutes (08.55) on D-Day (6 June) to spearhead 3rd Division's advance inland. It was one of the few conventional tank units actually to land on D-Day and had the ambitious objective of leading a mobile column to seize Caen. It was held up on the beach and by inland defences but got to within 3 miles (4.8 km) of Caen. Although it helped to destroy a counter-attack by German tanks, it was unable to complete the objective. The regiment then played its part in the weeks of fighting in Normandy, including Operation Goodwood, in which it was involved in stiff fighting round Troarn.

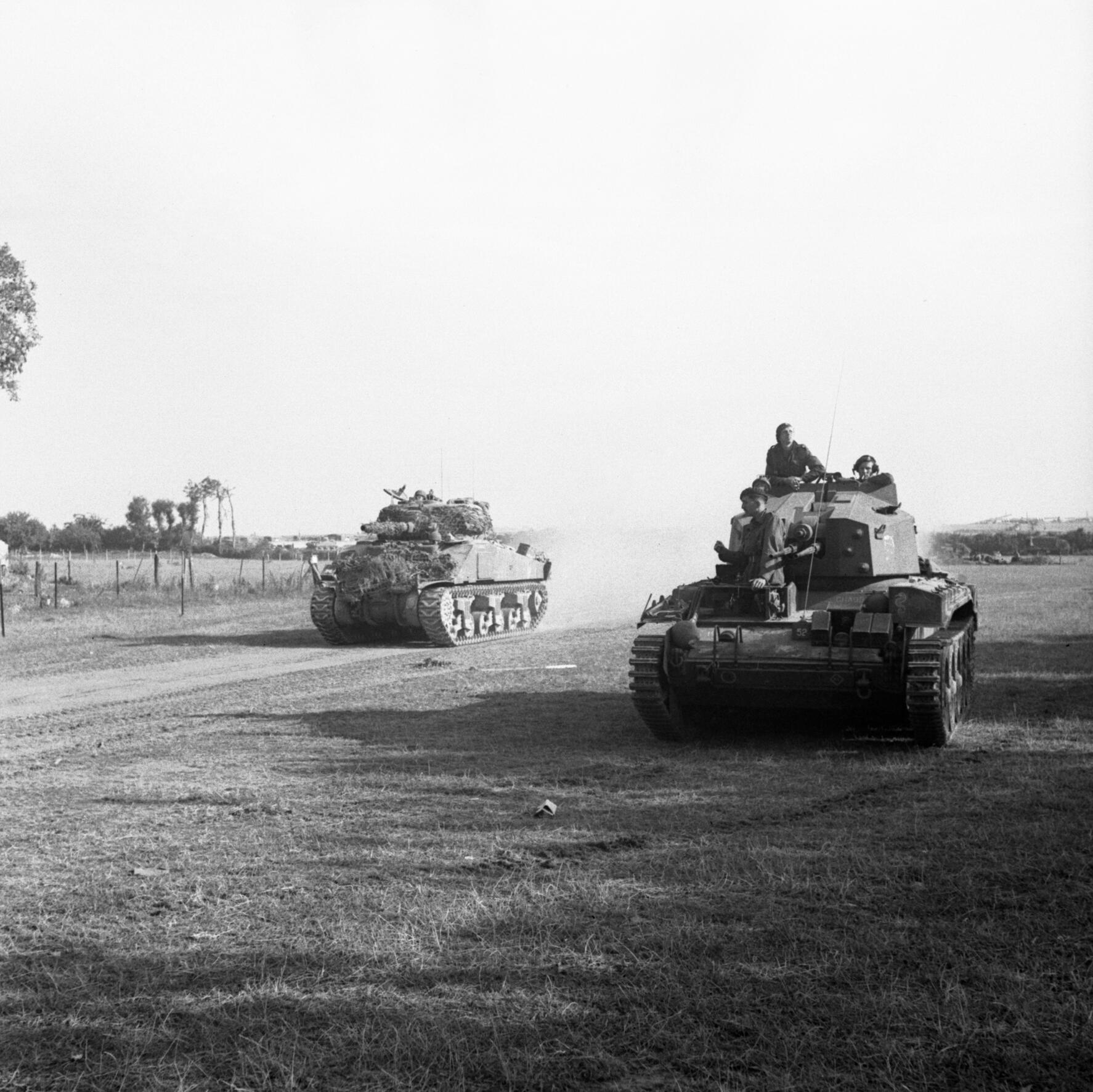
Sherman and Crusader AA Mk III tanks of the Staffordshire Yeomanry during Operation Goodwood, July 1944.

=== Battle of the Scheldt ===
Following heavy casualties in the Normandy campaign, 27th Armoured Bde was broken up on 30 July to reinforce other formations. The Staffordshire Yeomanry was sent back to the UK finally to train on DD tanks. After training, the regiment crossed to Belgium where from 17 September 1944 it came under the command of 79th Armoured Division. This division was equipped with specialist armour ('Hobart's Funnies') and assigned its units to other formation as required for specific operations.

The regiment's first action in its new role came during the Battle of the Scheldt. In Operation Vitality 52nd (Lowland) Division was launched in an amphibious assault on South Beveland, crossing the 9 miles (14 km) wide estuary in Landing Vehicle Tracked 'Buffaloes', accompanied by B Sqn Staffs Yeomanry, which had completed its DD training. (Note: The Scheldt crossing was the longest 'swim' ever attempted with DD tanks, and was achieved without a single casualty.) Most of the tanks were unable to climb the muddy dykes, but Lt-Gen Guy Simonds commanding II Canadian Corps considered that they had made 'a tremendous difference to the situation in South Beveland'.

=== Across the Rhine ===
For the assault crossing of the Rhine on 23 March 1945 (Operation Plunder), the Staffs Yeomanry was assigned to support 51st (Highland) Division. This time Buffaloes laid chestnut paling 'carpets' to help DD tanks up the steep and muddy banks. The regiment was heavily engaged in several days' fighting round Rees before British forces broke through and began a pursuit over North Germany. The regiment was involved in an action at Lingen on 15 April before being brought up to use its DD tanks for the last assault crossing of the campaign, at the River Elbe (Operation Enterprise) on 29 April. Hostilities ended with the German surrender at Lüneburg Heath on 4 May.

After VE Day the regiment continued serving on occupation duties with British Army of the Rhine (BAOR). The Staffordshire Yeomanry passed into suspended animation in BAOR on 1 March 1946.

== Postwar ==
When the TA was reconstituted on 1 January 1947 the regiment reformed, still as an armoured regiment, affiliated to 16th/5th The Queen's Royal Lancers in the Regular Army. It had the following organisation:

- HQ at Stafford
- A Squadron at Walsall
- B Squadron at Stoke-on-Trent
- C Squadron at Burton-on-Trent

When the TA was reduced into the Territorial and Army Volunteer Reserve (TAVR) in 1967, the regiment was reorganised as infantry as The Staffordshire Yeomanry (Queen's Own Royal Regiment). It absorbed some Staffordshire Royal Artillery (RA) and Royal Engineers (RE) units, but also transferred some personnel to the 5th/6th Battalion (Staffordshire Regiment), giving the following organisation:

- HQ at Wolverhampton
- A Squadron at Wolverhampton, formed from Staffordshire Yeomanry and HQ RA 48th (South Midland) Division
- B (887 Locating Battery) Squadron at Stafford, formed from 887 Locating Battery, RA (formerly 61st (North Midland) Field Regiment, RA) and part of 125 Engineer Regiment, RE (originally 59th (Staffordshire) Infantry Division RE)
- C Squadron at Burton-on-Trent, formed from Staffordshire Yeomanry and HQ RA 48th (South Midland) Division

The Staffordshire Yeomanry became part of the Mercian Yeomanry in 1971 (renamed the Queen's Own Mercian Yeomanry in 1973) with one of the squadrons being designated B (Staffordshire Yeomanry) Squadron.

In July 1999 B (Staffordshire Yeomanry) Squadron amalgamated with A (Queen's Own Warwickshire and Worcestershire Yeomanry) Squadron, also part of the Queen's Own Mercian Yeomanry, to form A (Staffordshire, Warwickshire and Worcestershire Yeomanry) Squadron, The Royal Mercian and Lancastrian Yeomanry at Dudley.

In July 2014 B (Staffordshire, Warwickshire and Worcestershire Yeomanry) Squadron re-subordinated to The Royal Yeomanry. However, in 2021 the squadron lost its Stafford lineage, becoming B (Warwickshire and Worcestershire Yeomanry) Squadron following an internal reorganisation of the Royal Yeomanry.

== Heritage and ceremonial ==
=== Uniforms and insignia ===
Individual Staffordshire Yeomanry troops may have worn black (Lichfield) or red facings on their jackets, but by 1804 the consolidated regiment had standardised on a red jacket with yellow facings, white waistcoat, white leather breeches and military boots. The headdress was a Tarleton helmet with a bearskin crest and black turban with silver chains, carrying a white-over-red feather on the left side. The belts were of pipeclayed leather. The men were armed with a sword (of old pattern) and pistol. On its formation the regiment adopted the motto Pro aris et focis ('For hearth and home') and the Staffordshire knot as its badge. The Volunteer Associations also seem to have adopted this uniform, except the Stone & Eccleshall Trp, which had black facings, and the Wolverhampton Trp, which may have worn a blue jacket.

In March 1808 the regiment's uniform underwent a complete change, when it adopted a blue jacket with white lace Hussar frogging and white facings (the trumpeters wore 'reversed colours', with white jackets frogged in blue lace). Buff leather breeches were worn. This uniform was replaced again in 1816 by a blue double-breasted (single-breasted from 1834) Light Dragoon Coatee with white facings and metal shoulder scales (Epaulettes for officers), and blue-green overalls with a double white stripe. The regiment was the last to wear the old pattern Tarleton helmet: this was finally replaced in 1837 by a bell-topped Shako with white horsehair plume. When the 'Queen's Own' title was granted in 1838 the white facings and trouser stripes were replaced with red, appropriate to a bluecoated 'Royal' regiment.

In 1850 the shako was replaced by a black metal Albert helmet with a black plume. From this period a French Kepi was worn as an undress cap, replaced by a pillbox cap in the 1880s. In 1853 black pouch belts and brown sword belts replaced the previous pipeclayed belts, and the new Light Dragoon tunic with white frogging was adopted in 1859, when the helmet plume reverted to white. The tunic was changed for the Hussar style in 1881, and the conversion to Hussar uniform was completed in 1893 when the Albert helmet was replaced by a black Busby with a red bag falling on the right side and an upright white plume.

During the Boer War the 6th (Staffordshire) Company, IY, wore the standard khaki uniform, initially with the foreign service helmet, on the left hand side of which was a cloth patch divided into vertical stripes red-blue-red, carrying the Staffordshire knot badge and the figure '6'. The Slouch hat proved more popular, with the Stafford knot badge on a red patch on the turned-up left side worn by both the 6th and 106th Companies. After the war the regiment adopted the khaki IY uniform in 1903, with red cuffs, collars and trefoil cuff ornament, worn with a slouch hat. After 1906 a simpler 'substitute full dress' and a blue undress uniform returned, with a peaked Service cap, while khaki service dress was worn in drill order.

The Stafford, Newcastle and Lichfield Trps were presented with standards by the Countess of Sutherland on 23 October 1795. These were yellow swallow-tailed guidons with in the centre the crowned Stafford knot surrounded by a wreath above the motto Pro aris et focis, and oval cartouches in each corner, those on the upper hoist and lower fly probably being red with the White Horse of Hanover. These and other standards were retired and replaced in 1835.

As a result of its service during the 1842 riots, the regiment was presented with 12 silver trumpets inscribed "Presented by a grateful County to the Queen's Own Royal Yeomanry for their services in 1842".

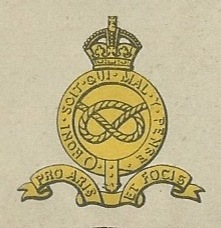
Staffordshire Yeimanry cap badge 1940s.

The simple Stafford knot badge in white metal was worn on head-dresses. From 1859 the buttons carried the knot within a garter inscribed 'THE QUEENS OWN ROYAL REGIMENT' and surmounted by a crown. This design in silver was adopted as the officers' cap and collar badge from 1898, with the addition of a lower scroll bearing the motto from 1906; it was worn in bronze on the field service cap from 1908. From 1913 the other ranks' cap badge was the knot surmounted by a crown. The shoulder straps of the khaki jacket carried a brass title, with the knot over 'S' over 'IY' until 1908, then 'T' over 'Y' over 'STAFFORD'. In the 1940s the brass cap badge used the design introduced for officers in 1906, with the regimental title on the garter replaced by the motto of the Order of the Garter.

=== Honorary colonels ===
The following served as honorary colonel of the regiment:

- Col William Bagot, 3rd Baron Bagot, appointed 22 July 1874, died 19 January 1887
- Col Henry Paget, 4th Marquess of Anglesey, appointed 5 March 1887, died 13 October 1898
- Col Cromartie Sutherland-Leveson-Gower, 4th Duke of Sutherland, appointed 20 December 1899, died 27 June 1913
- Hon Brig-Gen Sir William Bromley-Davenport, KCB, CMG, CBE, DSO, TD, appointed 7 April 1910, re-appointed 1 February 1919 died 6 February 1949
- Hon Col Charles Richard Farquhar, MBE, TD, appointed to vacancy 1 April 1961
- Brevet Col Henry Roy Marsh, MBE, TD, appointed 1 April 1966, re-appointed 1967 and 1969, relinquished on reorganisation 1 April 1971
- Maj D.G. Roddick, TD, appointed 1 April 1984
- Maj A.E.R. Manners, TD, appointed 3 January 1995

=== Memorials ===
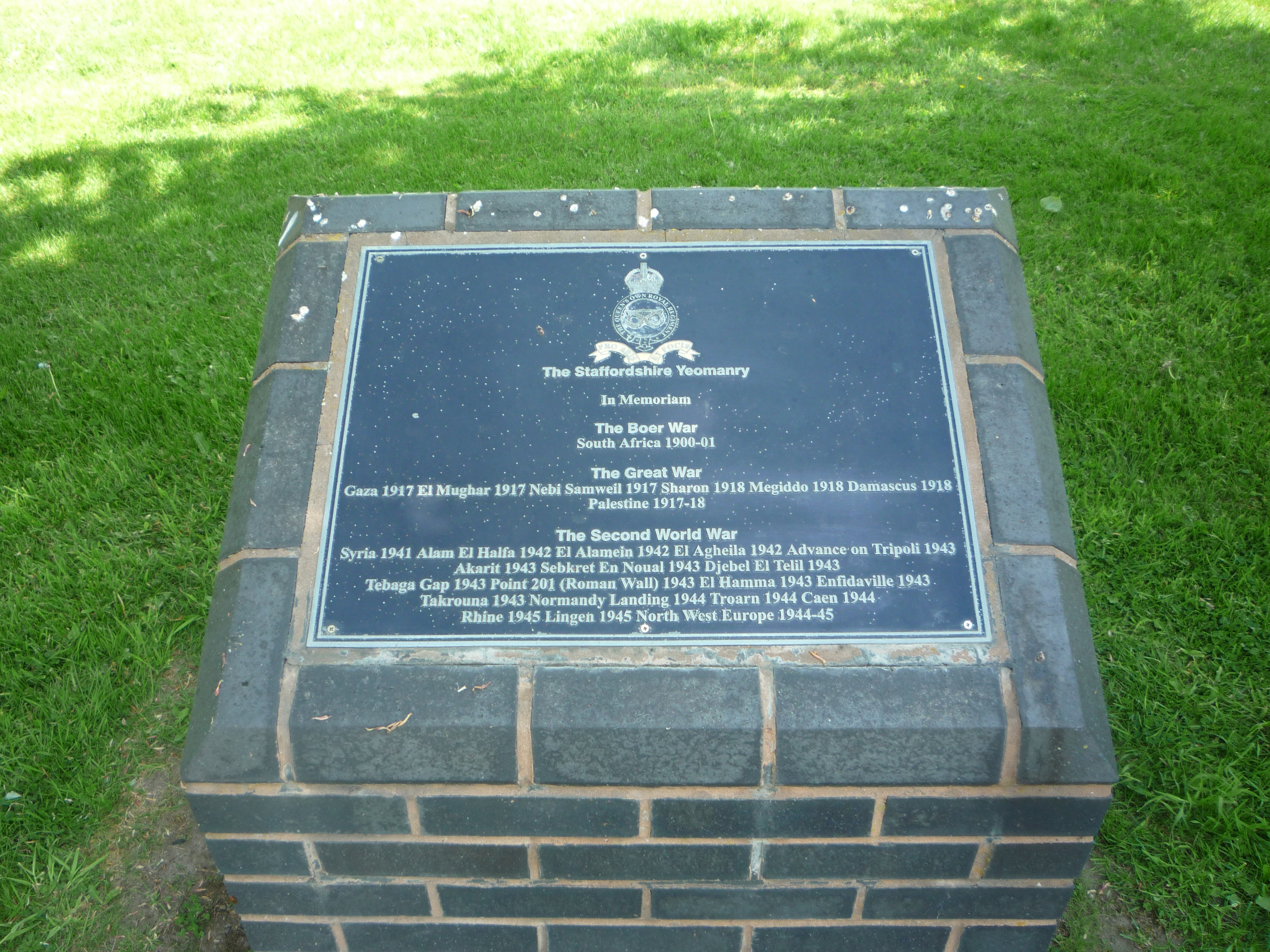
The Staffordshire Yeomanry memorial at the National Memorial Arboretum.

In May 1857 the regiment erected a memorial in Lichfield Cathedral to Lt-Col the Earl of Lichfield (1795–1854), who had joined the regiment as a trooper in 1811 before being appointed captain in the Lichfield Trp in 1812. He served for over 40 years, 20 of them in command of the regiment.

There is a modern memorial plaque to the Staffordshire Yeomanry in the grounds of the National Memorial Arboretum at Alrewas, near Lichfield. It lists all of the regiment's battle honours.

=== Battle honours ===
The Staffordshire Yeomanry was awarded the following battle honours (honours in bold are emblazoned on the guidon):

Second Boer War	**South Africa 1900–01**
World War I	**Egypt 1915–17**, **Gaza**, **El Mughar**, **Nebi Samwil**, **Megiddo**, **Sharon**, **Damascus**, **Palestine 1917–18**
World War II	**Normandy Landing**, **Caen**, Troarn, **Rhine**, Lingen, North-West Europe 1944–45, Syria 1941, **Alam el Halfa**, **El Alamein**, **El Agheila**, **Advance on Tripoli**, **Tebaga Gap**, Point 201 (Roman Wall), El Hamma, **Akarit**, Sebkret en Noual, Djebel el Telil, **Enfidaville**, Takrouna, North Africa 1942–43

== See also ==
- 1/1st Staffordshire Yeomanry
- Staffordshire Yeomanry, Royal Armoured Corps
- Imperial Yeomanry
- List of Yeomanry Regiments 1908
- Yeomanry
- Yeomanry order of precedence
- British yeomanry during the First World War
- Second line yeomanry regiments of the British Army

== Bibliography ==
- L.S. Amery (ed), The Times History of the War in South Africa 1899-1902, London: Sampson Low, Marston, 7 Vols 1900–09.
- Anon, Regimental Badges and Service Caps, London: George Philip & Sons, 1941.
- Anon, A Short History of the 8th Armoured Brigade, Hanover, 1946.
- Henry Bathurst, The Auxiliary Forces List: Staffordshire-Warwickshire-Worcestershire, Leamington: Bathurst, 1876.
- Maj A.F. Becke, History of the Great War: Order of Battle of Divisions, Part 2a: The Territorial Force Mounted Divisions and the 1st-Line Territorial Force Divisions (42–56), London: HM Stationery Office, 1935/Uckfield: Naval & Military Press, 2007, ISBN 1-84734-739-8.
- Maj A.F. Becke, History of the Great War: Order of Battle of Divisions, Part 2b: The 2nd-Line Territorial Force Divisions (57th–69th), with the Home-Service Divisions (71st–73rd) and 74th and 75th Divisions, London: HM Stationery Office, 1937/Uckfield: Naval & Military Press, 2007, ISBN 1-84734-739-8.
- Stanley Christopherson (James Holland, ed.), An Englishman at War: The Wartime Diaries of Stanley Christopherson, DSO, MC, TD, London: Bantam, 2014, ISBN 978-0-593-06837-3.
- Richard Doherty, Hobart's 79th Armoured Division at War: Invention, Innovation and Inspiration, Barnsley: Pen & Sword, 2011, ISBN 978-1-84884-398-1.
- Col John K. Dunlop, The Development of the British Army 1899–1914, London: Methuen, 1938.
- Maj L.F. Ellis, History of the Second World War, United Kingdom Military Series: Victory in the West, Vol I: The Battle of Normandy, London: HM Stationery Office, 1962/Uckfield: Naval & Military, 2004, ISBN 1-84574-058-0.
- Maj L.F. Ellis, History of the Second World War, United Kingdom Military Series: Victory in the West, Vol II: The Defeat of Germany, London: HM Stationery Office, 1968/Uckfield: Naval & Military, 2004, ISBN 1-84574-059-9.
- Capt Cyril Falls, History of the Great War: Military Operations, Egypt and Palestine, Vol II, From June 1917 to the End of the War, Part I, London: HM Stationery Office, 1930/Uckfield: Naval & Military Press, 2013, ISBN 978-1-84574-951-4.
- Capt Cyril Falls, History of the Great War: Military Operations, Egypt and Palestine, Vol II, From June 1917 to the End of the War, Part II, London: HM Stationery Office, 1930/Uckfield: Naval & Military Press, 2013, ISBN 978-1-84574-950-7.
- Fortin, Ludovic (2004). British Tanks in Normandy. Histoire & Collections. ISBN 2-915239-33-9.
- J.B.M. Frederick, Lineage Book of British Land Forces 1660–1978, Vol I, Wakefield, Microform Academic, 1984, ISBN 1-85117-007-3.
- Nick Hawkins, 'Mechanization or Conversion: The Yeomanry of 1st Cavalry Division in the Middle East, 1940–42', Journal of the Society for Army Historical Research, Vol 97, No 391 (Winter 2019), pp. 355–371. JSTOR 26899884
- M.W. Greenslade, Victoria County History: Stafford Vol XIV: Lichfield, 1980, ISBN 978-0-19-722778-7.
- Brig E.A. James, British Regiments 1914–18, London: Samson Books, 1978, ISBN 0-906304-03-2/Uckfield: Naval & Military Press, 2001, ISBN 978-1-84342-197-9.
- Lt-Col H.F. Joslen, Orders of Battle, United Kingdom and Colonial Formations and Units in the Second World War, 1939–1945, London: HM Stationery Office, 1960/London: London Stamp Exchange, 1990, ISBN 0-948130-03-2/Uckfield: Naval & Military Press, 2003, ISBN 1-84342-474-6.
- Tim Kilvert-Jones, Battleground Europe: Sword Beach: 3rd British Infantry Division's Battle for the Normandy Beachhead, 6–10 June 1944, Barnsley: Pen & Sword, 2019, ISBN 978-0-85052-673-8.
- Lt-Gen Sir George MacMunn & Capt Cyril Falls, History of the Great War: Military Operations, Egypt and Palestine, Vol I, From the Outbreak of War with Germany to June 1917, London: HM Stationery Office, 1928/Imperial War Museum and Battery Press, 1992, ISBN 1-870423-26-7/Uckfield: Naval & Military Press, 2011, ISBN 978-1-84574-952-1.
- Mander, C. Nicholas (2004). Varnished Leaves: a biography of the Mander Family of Wolverhampton, 1750-1950. Owlpen Press.
- Mileham, Patrick (1994). The Yeomanry Regiments; 200 Years of Tradition. Edinburgh: Canongate Academic. ISBN 1-898410-36-4.
- Maj-Gen I.S.O. Playfair, History of the Second World War, United Kingdom Military Series: The Mediterranean and Middle East, Vol II: The Germans come to the aid of their Ally (1941), London: HM Stationery Office, 1956/Uckfield, Naval & Military Press, 2004, ISBN 1-84574-066-1.
- Maj-Gen I.S.O. Playfair, History of the Second World War, United Kingdom Military Series: The Mediterranean and Middle East, Vol III: (September 1941 to September 1942) British Fortunes reach their Lowest Ebb, London: HM Stationery Office, 1960 /Uckfield, Naval & Military Press, 2004, ISBN 1-84574-067-X
- Maj-Gen I.S.O. Playfair & Brig C.J.C. Molony, "History of the Second World War, United Kingdom Military Series: The Mediterranean and Middle East", Vol IV: The Destruction of the Axis forces in Africa, London: HM Stationery Office, 1966/Uckfield, Naval & Military Press, 2004, ISBN 1-84574-068-8.
- Rinaldi, Richard A (2008). Order of Battle of the British Army 1914. Ravi Rikhye. ISBN 978-0-9776072-8-0.
- Lt-Col Ernest Ryan, 'Arms, Uniforms and Equipment of the Yeomanry Cavalry', Journal of the Society for Army Historical Research, September 1957, Vol 35, pp. 124–33. JSTOR 44228854
- Tim Saunders, Battleground Europe: Operation Plunder: The British and Canadian Rhine Crossing, Barnsley: Pen & Sword, 2006, ISBN 1-84415-221-9.
- Arthur Sleigh, The Royal Militia and Yeomanry Cavalry Army List, April 1850, London: British Army Despatch Press, 1850/Uckfield: Naval and Military Press, 1991, ISBN 978-1-84342-410-9.
- R.J. Smith & C.R. Coogan, The Uniforms of the British Yeomanry Force 1794–1914, 15: Staffordshire Yeomanry, Feltham: Robert Ogilby Trust/Chippenham: Picton Publishing, 1993, ISBN 0-9515714-6-X.
- Edward M. Spiers, The Army and Society 1815–1914, London: Longmans, 1980, ISBN 0-582-48565-7.
- Strawson, Jon (2004). Battle for North Africa. Leo Cooper. ISBN 978-1-84415-105-9.
- Philip Talbot, 'The English Yeomanry in the Nineteenth Century and the Great Boer War', Journal of the Society for Army Historical Research, Vol 79, No 317 (Spring 2001), pp. 45–62. JSTOR 44230659
- War Office, A List of the Officers of the Militia, the Gentlemen & Yeomanry Cavalry, and Volunteer Infantry of the United Kingdom, 11th Edn, London: War Office, 14 October 1805/Uckfield: Naval and Military Press, 2005, ISBN 978-1-84574-207-2.
- Capt P.C.G. Webster, The Records of the Queen's Own Royal Regiment of Staffordshire Yeomanry, Lichfield: Lomax, 1870.

=== External links ===
- Anglo Boer War site
- Chris Baker, The Long, Long Trail
- Black Country History
- British Army units from 1945 on
- Bruce Bassett-Powell's Uniformology.
- Mark Conrad, The British Army, 1914 (archive site)
- The Drill Hall Project
- History of Parliament Online
- T.F. Mills, Land Forces of Britain, the Empire and Commonwealth – Regiments.org (archive site)
- Roll of Honour
- Richard A. Warren, This Re-illuminated School of Mars: Auxiliary forces and other aspects of Albion under Arms in the Great War against France
