= Blithfield Hall =

Grade I listed building in the United Kingdom

Coordinates: 52.812987°N 1.935716°W

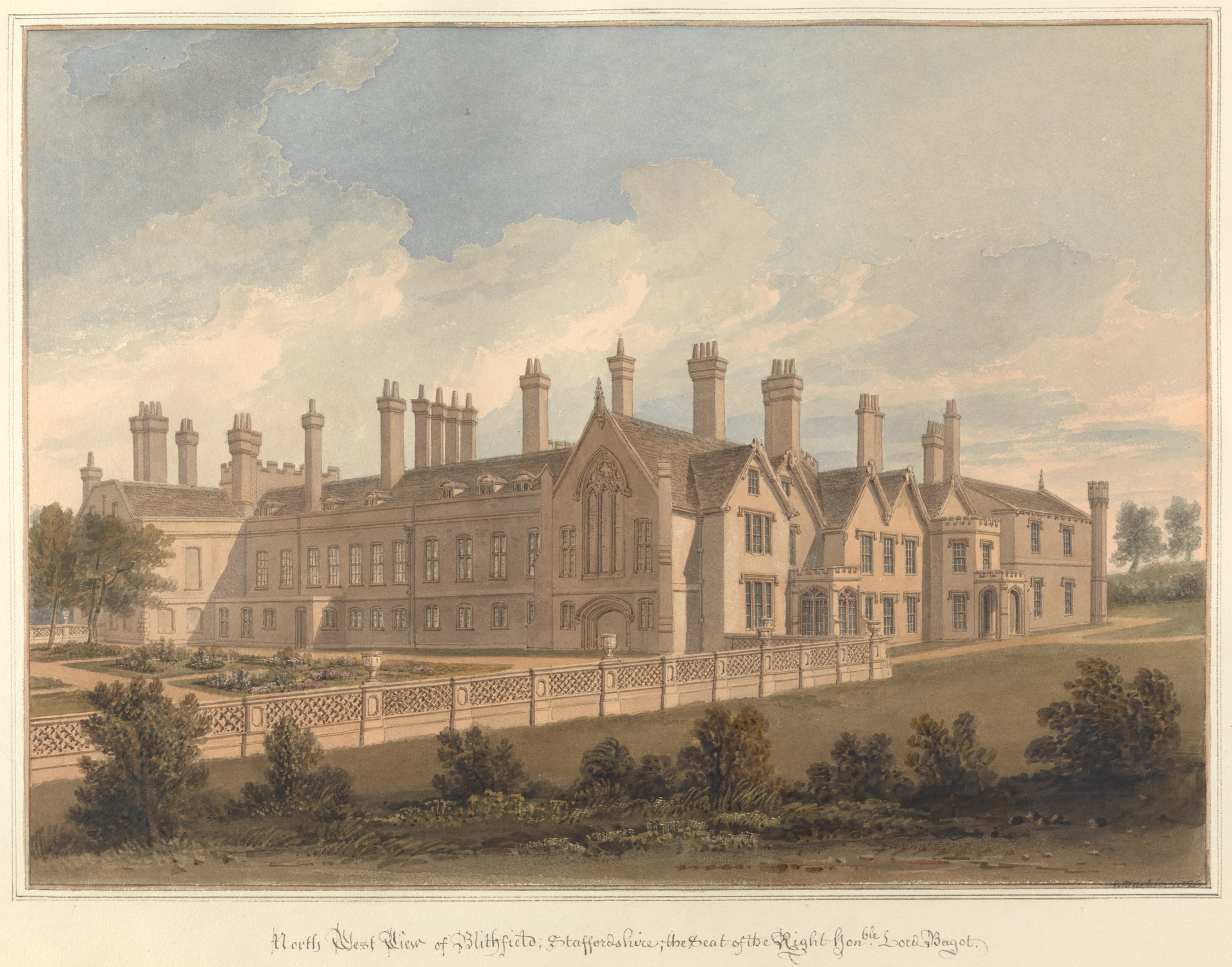
Blithfield Hall by John Buckler, John Chessell Buckler

Blithfield Hall (pronounced locally as Bliffield), is a privately owned Grade I listed country house in Staffordshire, England, situated some 9 miles (14 km) east of Stafford, 7 miles (11 km) southwest of Uttoxeter and 5 miles (8.0 km) north of Rugeley.

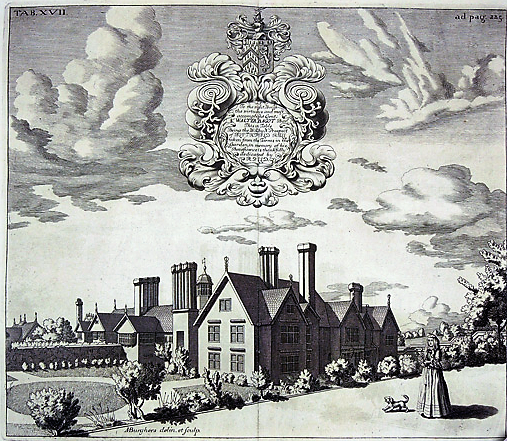
Blithfield Hall: the earliest known record of the house is this engraving of the north and west fronts, from Dr. Plot's Natural History of Staffordshire (1686). The cupola over the hall can be seen to the left of the large gable in the centre.

The Hall, with its embattled towers and walls, has been the home of the Bagot family since the late 14th century. The present house is mainly Elizabethan, with a neo-Gothic façade added in the 1820s to a design probably by John Buckler. The decoration of the house was carried out by the Gothic-style plasterer, Francis Bernasconi.

In 1945 the Hall, then in a neglected and dilapidated state, was sold by Gerald Bagot, 5th Baron Bagot, together with its 650-acre (260 ha) estate to South Staffordshire Waterworks Company, whose intention was to build a reservoir (completed in 1953). The 5th Baron died in 1946 having sold many of the contents of the house. His successor and cousin Caryl Bagot, 6th Baron Bagot, repurchased the property and 30 acres (12 ha) of land from the water company and began an extensive programme of renovation and restoration.

In September 1959 Lord Bagot sold Blithfield Hall at an open auction held in the Shrewsbury Arms, Rugeley. The property was bought for £12,000 (2011: £160,000) by his wife Nancy, Lady Bagot.

The 6th Baron died in 1961. In 1986, the Hall was divided into four separate houses. The main part which incorporates the Great Hall is owned by the Bagot Jewitt Trust. The Bagot Jewitt family remain in residence.

On a Monday in early September every year, villagers from nearby Abbots Bromley visit the Hall to perform the Abbots Bromley Horn Dance.

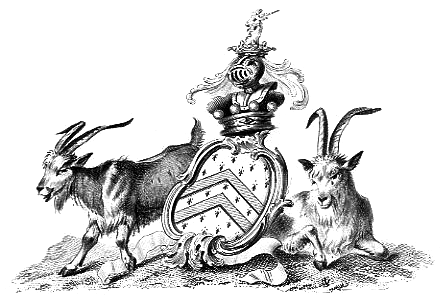
Arms of the Barons Bagot, featuring the Bagot goat

Blithfield Hall is known as the home of a breed of goat, the Bagot goat. The part of the parish known as Bagot's Bromley took its name from ownership by the family since 1360. Bagot's Wood, the remains of the ancient Needwood Forest, also takes its name from the Bagots.

== See also ==
- List of Grade I listed buildings in Staffordshire
- Listed buildings in Blithfield
- Bagot Barons and Baronets
