= William Bagot, 2nd Baron Bagot =

British peer (1773-1856)

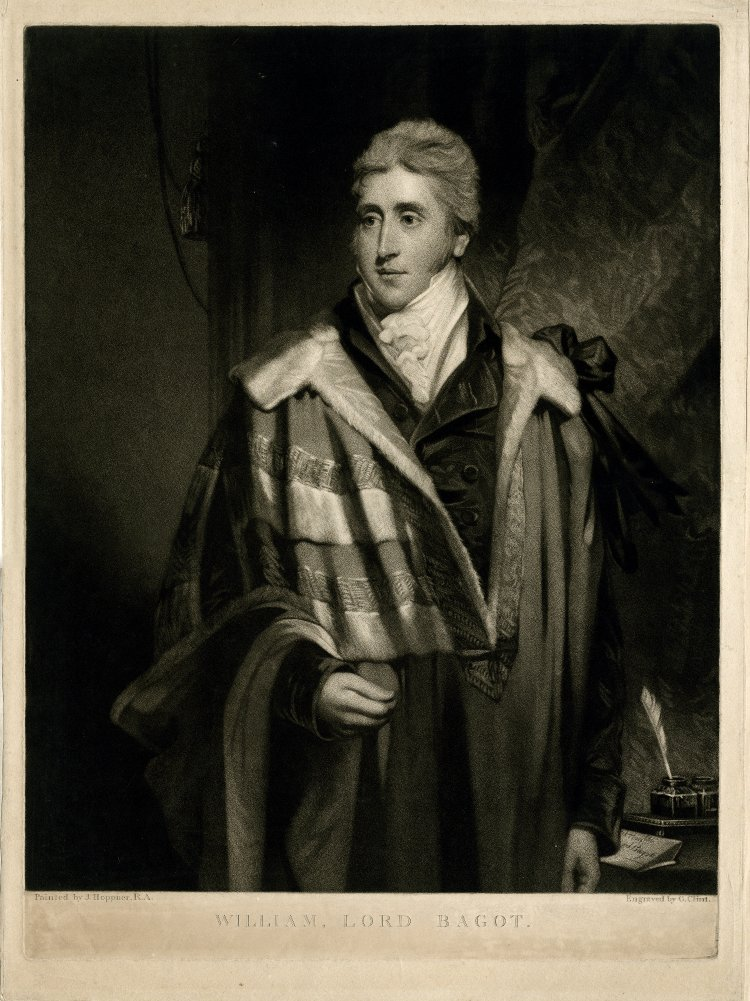
Mezzotint portrait of William Bagot, 2nd Baron Bagot, by George Clint

William Bagot, 2nd Baron Bagot (11 September 1773 – 12 February 1856), was a British peer.

William Bagot was born in London, the eldest son of William Bagot, 1st Baron Bagot, and his second wife Elizabeth Louisa St John. He was educated at Westminster School and matriculated at Christ Church, Oxford, on 10 November 1791. He married twice; firstly the Hon. Emily Fitzroy, daughter of Lt-Gen Charles Fitzroy, 1st Baron Southampton, on 30 May 1799, and secondly (after the death in 1800 of his first wife) Lady Louisa Legge, daughter of George Legge, 3rd Earl of Dartmouth, on 17 February 1807. He succeeded to his titles of 7th Baronet Bagot, of Blithfield, and 2nd Baron Bagot, of Bagot's Bromley, on 22 October 1798. He had one child, Louisa Barbara, who died in infancy, by his first wife and six children, Louisa Frances, Agnes, William (his successor), Hervey Charles, Eleanor and Alfred Walter, by his second.

He was invested as a Fellow of Society of Antiquaries and then in 1834 awarded the honorary degree of Doctor of Civil Law (D.C.L.) by Oxford University.

He wrote a book in 1823, Memorials of the Bagot Family, detailing the Bagot family genealogy up to that point.

Lord Bagot died at the family home in Blithfield, Staffordshire, and was succeeded in his titles by William Bagot, 3rd Baron Bagot.

== Notes ==
Peerage of Great Britain
Preceded by William Bagot	Baron Bagot; 1798–1856	Succeeded by William Bagot
