= Bagot (surname) =

Bagot is a surname, and may refer to:

- Alec Bagot (1893–1968), Australian adventurer, polemicist and politician
- Arthur Bagot (1888–1979), Australian naval officer and farmer
- Caryl Bagot, 6th Baron Bagot (1877–1961), English peer
- Charles Bagot (1781–1843), English diplomat and colonial administrator
- Charles Hervey Bagot (1788–1880), South Australian parliamentarian
- Sir Edward Bagot, 2nd Baronet (1616–1673), English landowner and politician
- Sir Edward Bagot, 4th Baronet (1674–1712), English politician
- Edward Meade Bagot (1822–1886), Australian pastoralist and developer
- Gerald Bagot, 5th Baron Bagot (1866–1946), English landowner
- Harriet Frances Bagot, Lady Thynne (1816–1881), British novelist
- Henry Bagot (c.1507–1536), English Member of Parliament
- Hervey Bagot (1591–1660), English Member of Parliament and baronet
- Jean Bagot (1591–1664), French Jesuit theologian
- Jean-Claude Bagot (born 1958), French cyclist
- John Bagot (cricketer) (1842–1901), British Guianese cricketer
- John Bagot (1849–1910), businessman and South Australian colonial politician
- John Tuthill Bagot (1819–1870), lawyer and South Australian colonial politician
- Josceline Bagot (1854–1913), British army officer and Member of Parliament
- Lewis Bagot (1740–1802), Anglican cleric
- Milicent Bagot (1907–2006), British intelligence officer
- Patricia Bagot (1942–2007), Scottish housing specialist
- R. C. Bagot (1827–1881), horse racing official in Melbourne, Australia
- Richard Bagot (bishop) (1782–1854), English cleric
- Richard Bagot (writer) (1860–1921), English novelist and essayist
- Rosemary Bagot (born 1981), Canadian neuroscientist
- Theodosia Bagot (1865–1940), British nurse and benefactor
- Walter Bagot (died 1622) (1557–1622/23), English Member of Parliament
- Sir Walter Bagot, 3rd Baronet (1644–1704), English barrister and landowner
- Sir Walter Bagot, 5th Baronet (1702–1768), English Member of Parliament
- Walter Bagot (priest) (1731–1806), English cleric and landowner
- Walter Bagot (architect) (1880–1963), South Australian architect
- William Bagot (politician) (died 1407), favourite of King Richard II and Shakespearean character
- William Bagot, 1st Baron Bagot (1728–1798), British politician
- William Bagot, 2nd Baron Bagot (1773–1856), British peer
- William Bagot, 3rd Baron Bagot (1811–1887), British courtier and Conservative politician
- William Bagot, 4th Baron Bagot (1857–1932), British peer and Conservative politician
- Yoann Bagot (born 1987), French road bicycle racer

== See also ==
- Baggot
