= Bagot =

Bagot may refer to:

== People ==
- Bagot (surname)

== Places ==
- Bagot (federal electoral district), former Quebec electoral district
- Bagot (provincial electoral district), former Quebec provincial electoral district
- Bagot (Province of Canada), a district of Quebec established in 1853
- Bagot, Manitoba, an unincorporated community in Manitoba
- Bagot's Wood, a wood in Staffordshire, England
- Bagot, Northern Territory, an aboriginal community in Darwin, Australia

== Other ==
- Bagot goat, a British breed of semi-wild goat
- Mount Bagot, a mountain on the Canada-US border
- Rush–Bagot Treaty, a treaty of 1817 between the US and the UK

== See also ==
- Walter Bagehot, British journalist
- Woods Bagot, a global architecture and consulting studio originating in South Australia
- Hundred of Bagot (disambiguation)
