= John Bagot =

John Bagot may refer to:

- John Bagot (cricketer) (1842–1901), British Guianese cricketer
- John Bagot (1849–1910), businessman and South Australian colonial politician
- John Tuthill Bagot (1819–1870), lawyer and South Australian colonial politician
