= Richard Bagot =

Richard Bagot may refer to:

- Richard Bagot (writer) (1860–1921), English novelist and essayist
- Richard Bagot (bishop) (1782–1854), English cleric

== See also ==
- Bagot (disambiguation)
