= Valley FM =

Valley FM is the on air name used by a number of radio stations:

- 1VFM in Canberra, Australia
- 2LVR in Parkes, Australia
- 3V05 in Bright, Australia
- 4BVR in Esk, Australia
- Valley FM (South Africa) in the Western Cape, South Africa
- Valley FM (Scotland) Bo'ness and Forth Valley, Central Scotland
