= Emily Georgiana Finch-Hatton, Countess of Winchilsea =

British countess and former Maids of Honor

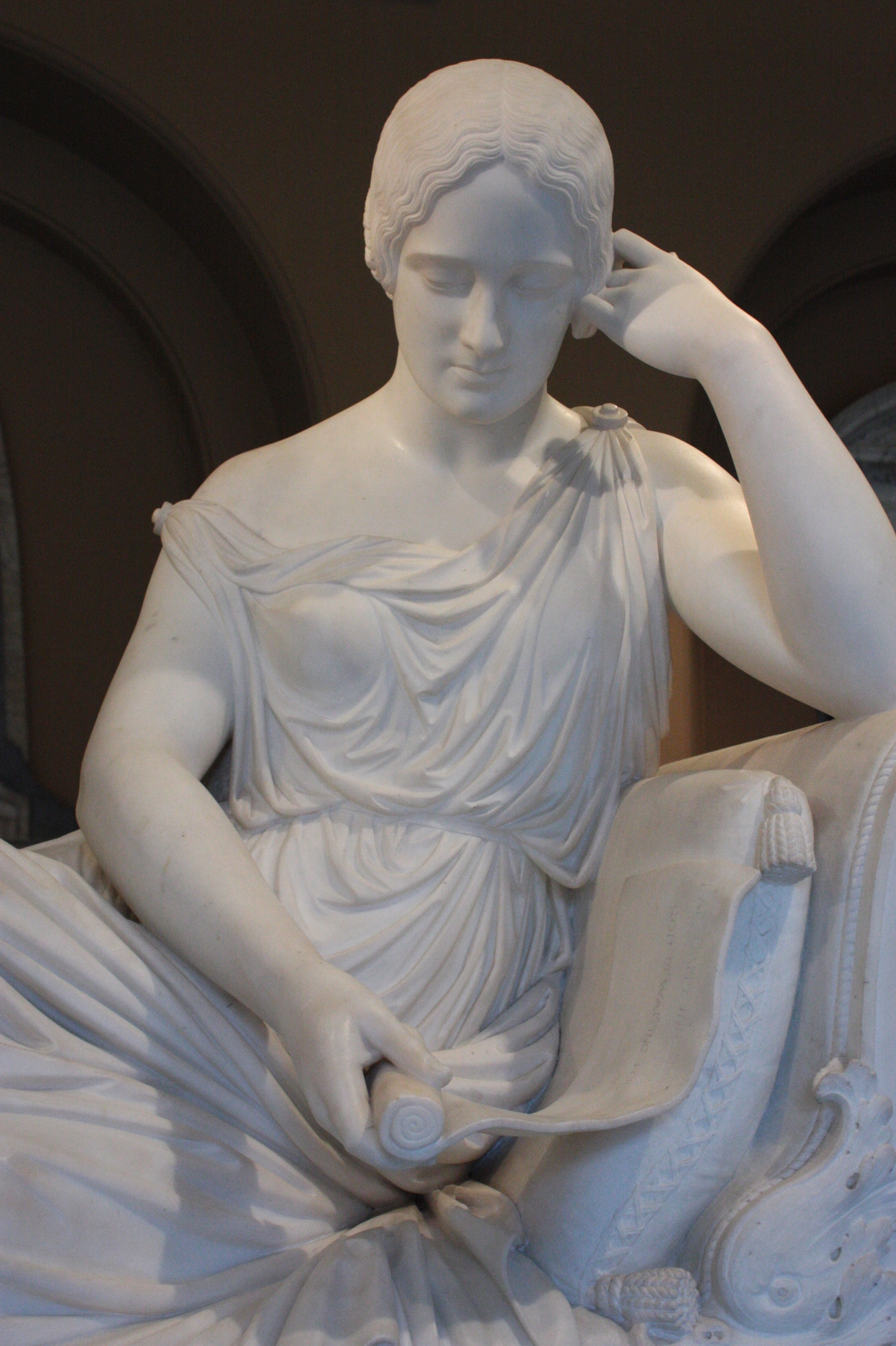
Monument to Emily Georgiana, Countess of Winchilsea (detail) by Lawrence MacDonald, 1850, Victoria and Albert Museum

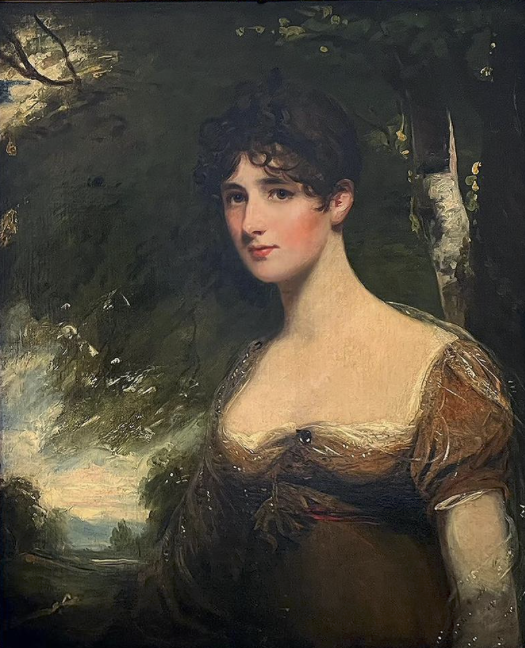
Her mother Lady Bagot born Lady Mary Charlotte Anne Wellesly-Pole by John Hoppner.

Emily Georgiana Finch-Hatton, Countess of Winchilsea and Nottingham (née Bagot; 9 July 1809 - 10 July 1848) was the second of six daughters of Sir Charles Bagot, G.C.B. and Lady Mary Charlotte Anne Wellesley-Pole, daughter of 3rd Earl of Mornington. Her mother Lady Mary Anne was the niece of Duke of Wellington (1769–1852), hence making her a great-niece to the duke.

On 15 February 1837, Emily married George Finch-Hatton, 10th Earl of Winchilsea, as his second wife. The wedding was witnessed by her great-uncle the Duke of Wellington, Lord Stormont, Lady Mary Fox, and Lord and Lady Robert Grosvenor (most relatives of both families were present). She was led through the aisle by her grandfather the 3rd Earl of Mornington, whose care and protection she had brought since infancy. It was reported that "Her beauty was only equalled by her sweetness of disposition".

Emily was a maid of honor to Queen Adelaide. After she got married, the queen presented her a handsome designed jewellry as a wedding present. In May 1837, Lord and Lady Winchilsea left Wilton Crescent (their London residence) to visit the King and Queen at Windsor Castle.

She died at Haverholme Priory in Ewerby on 10 July 1848 and was buried in the chancel of Ewerby Church in Lincolnshire. The couple did not have any children together.

The Scottish sculptor Lawrence Macdonald was commissioned by her husband to make a monument to her, which was finished in 1850. It stood in the south porch of St Mary's Church, Eastwell which was subsequently converted into a chapel. In the 1960s it was given to the Victoria and Albert Museum by the Rector and Church wardens of the Parish of Eastwell and is now on display in the Dorothy and Michael Hintze Galleries.

The scroll which her statue is holding reads, in capitals: I am happy indeed happy in the word God is waiting for me. The text around the plinth of the monument, also written in capitals, reads:

I
When the knell rung for the dying
Soundeth for me
And my corse coldly is lying
Neath the green tree

II
When the turf strangers are heaping
Covers my breast
Comes not to gaze on me weeping
I am at rest

III
All my life coldly and sadly
The days have gone by
I who dreamed wildly and madly
Am happy to die

IV
Long since my heart has been breaking
Its pain is past
A time has been set to its aching
Peace comes at last

— E.G. W.& N.

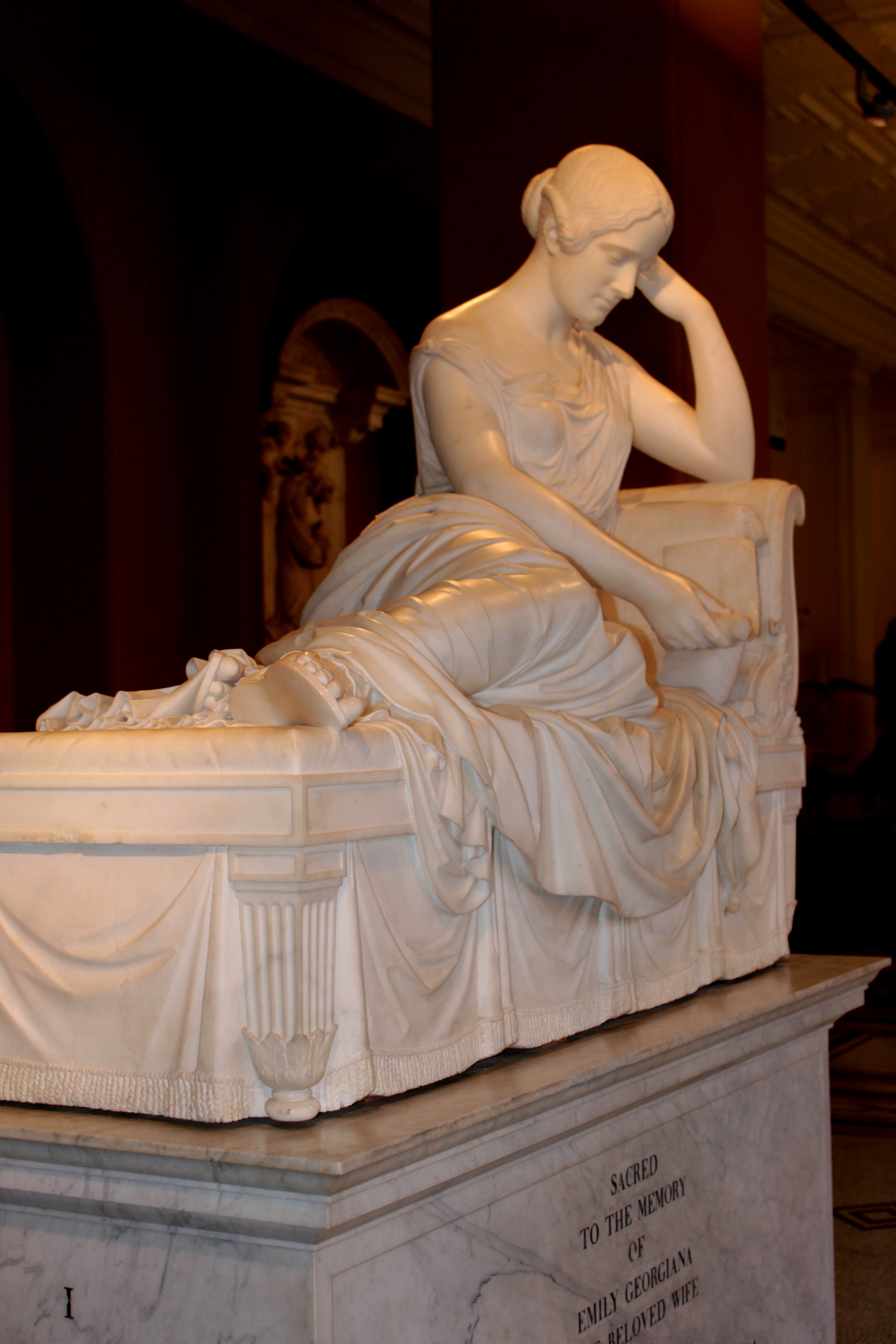
Victoria & Albert Museum

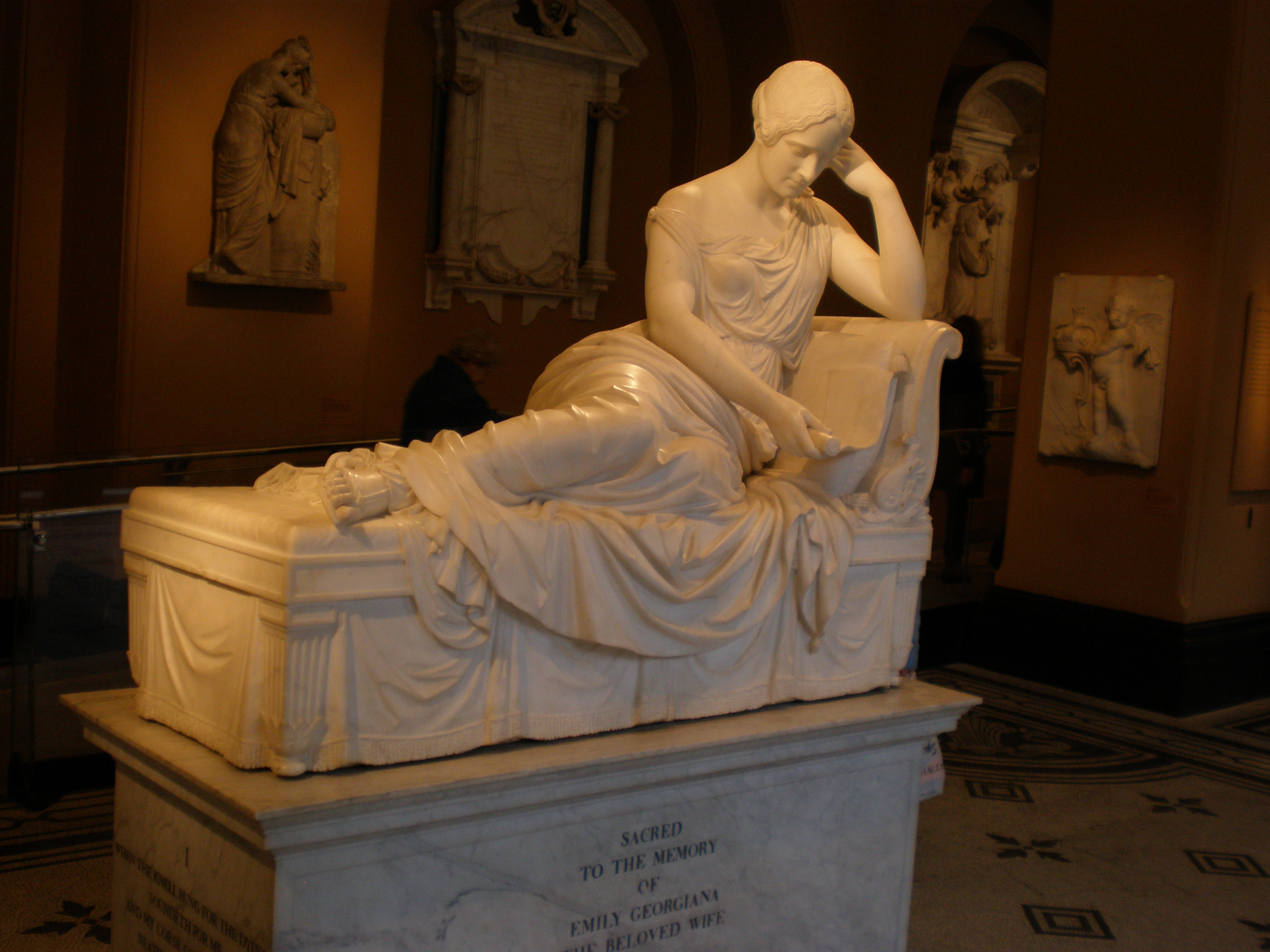

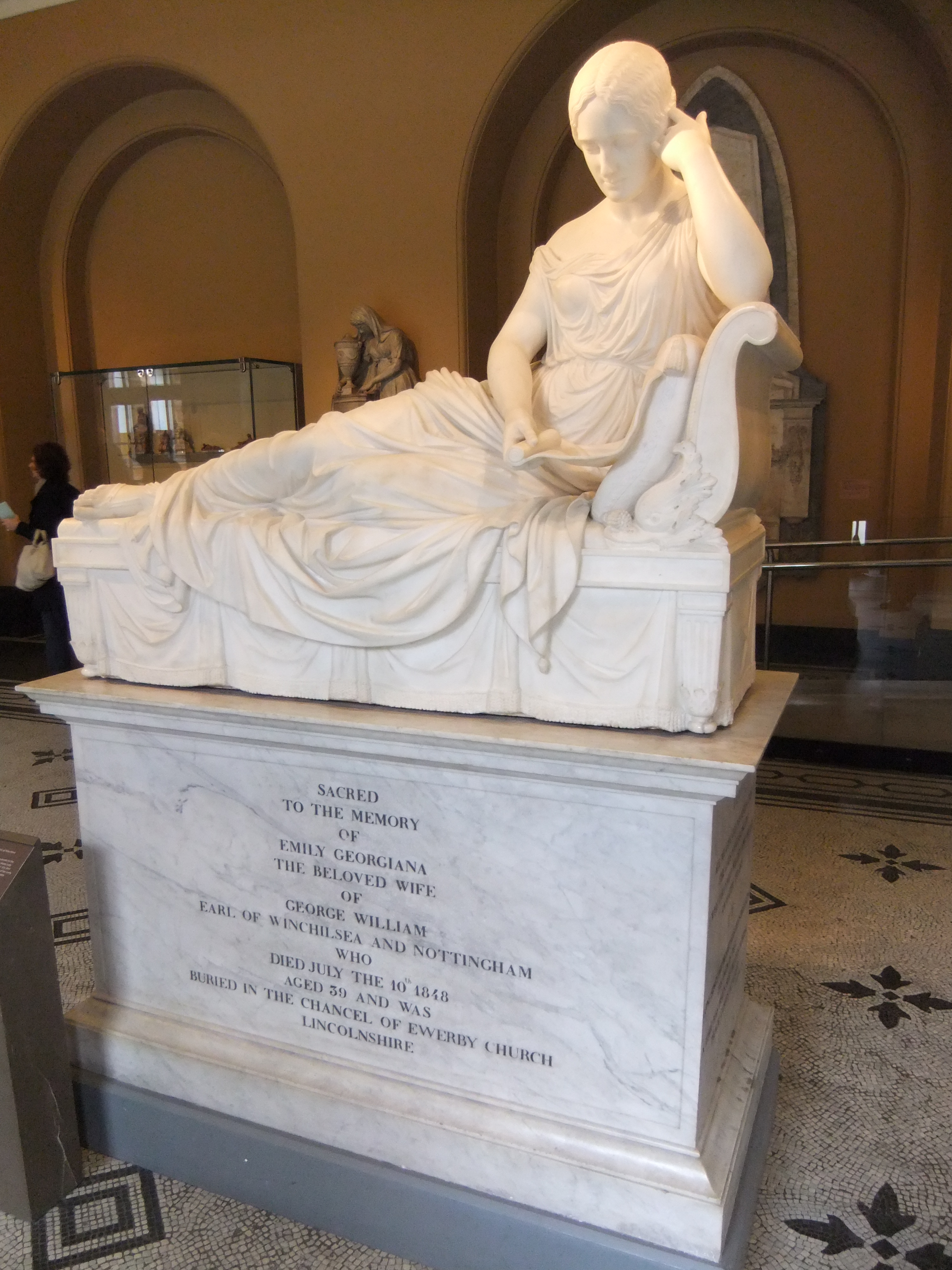

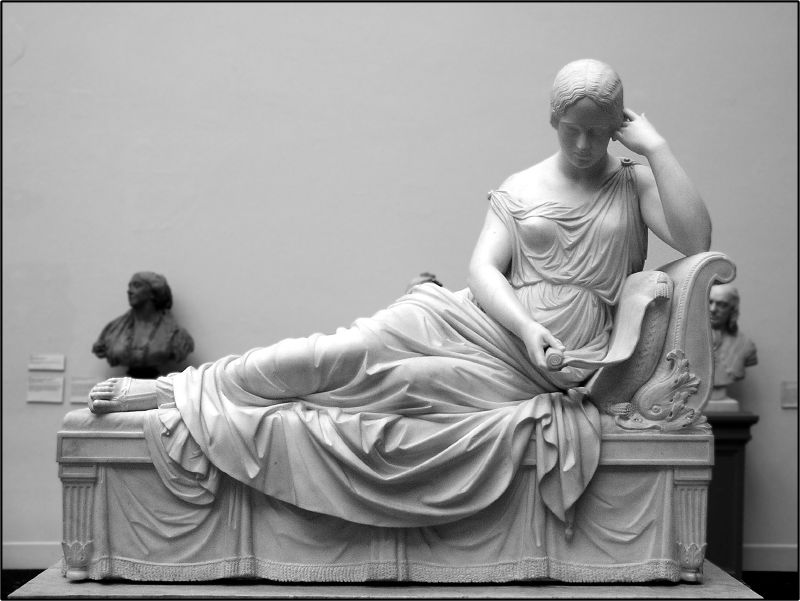

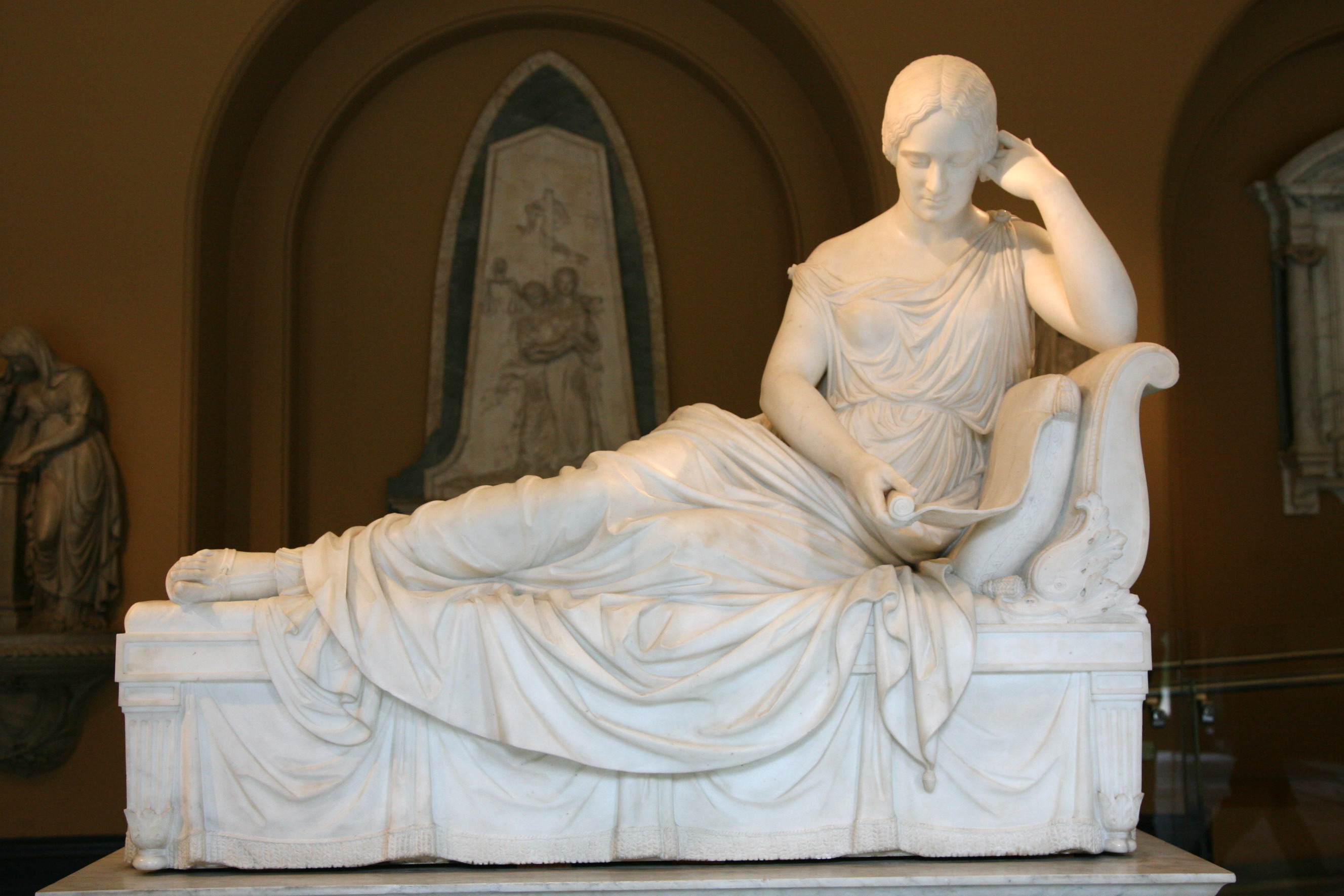

== Sources ==
- Lodge, Edmund (1859). Lodge's Peerage and Baronetage (knightage & Companionage) of the British Empire. Hurst & Blackett.
- Physick, John (1970). "Five Monuments from Eastwell". Victoria & Albert Museum Yearbook, II. Phaidon Press. pp. 135–136.
- "Bagot, Sir Charles". Oxford Dictionary of National Biography (online ed.). Oxford University Press. doi:10.1093/ref:odnb/1037. (Subscription, Wikipedia Library access or UK public library membership required.)
- "Hatton, George William Finch-, tenth earl of Winchilsea and fifth earl of Nottingham". Oxford Dictionary of National Biography (online ed.). Oxford University Press. doi:10.1093/ref:odnb/9447. (Subscription, Wikipedia Library access or UK public library membership required.)
- "Monument to Emily Georgiana, Lady Winchilsea". V&A Collections.
