= Bo'ness =

Coordinates: 56.01681°N 3.60891°W

Bo'ness Borrowstounness
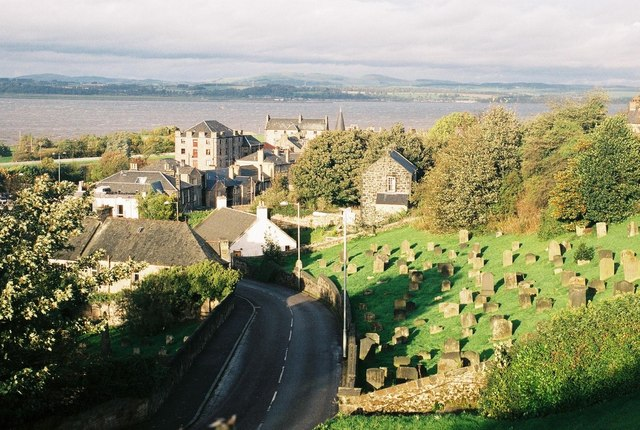
- A view over the town looking north towards the Firth of Forth

- Location within the Falkirk council area
- Area: 2.3 sq mi (6.0 km^{2})
- Population: 14,840 (2020)
  - Density: 6,452/sq mi (2,491/km^{2})
- OS grid reference: NS998816
  - Edinburgh: 16.9 mi (27.2 km)
  - London: 343 mi (552 km)
- Council area: Falkirk
- Lieutenancy area: Stirling and Falkirk
- Country: Scotland
- Sovereign state: United Kingdom
- Post town: BO'NESS
- Postcode district: EH51
- Dialling code: 01506
- Police: Scotland
- Fire: Scottish
- Ambulance: Scottish
- UK Parliament: Bathgate and Linlithgow
- Scottish Parliament: Falkirk East
- Website: falkirk.gov.uk

Borrowstounness, commonly known as Bo'ness (/boʊˈnɛs/ boh-NESS), is a town and former burgh and seaport on the south bank of the Firth of Forth in the Central Lowlands of Scotland. Historically part of the county of West Lothian, it now lies within the Falkirk council area, 17 miles (27 kilometres) northwest of Edinburgh and 6 3/4 miles (11 kilometres) east of Falkirk. At the 2011 census, the population of Bo'ness was 15,100.

Until the 20th century, Bo'ness was the site of various industrial activities, including coal mining, saltmaking and pottery production. With its location beside the Forth, the town and its harbour grew in importance in the Industrial Revolution and later continued to grow into the Victorian era. Since the late 20th century, deindustrialisation has changed the nature of the town, with the coal mine closing in 1982 and the waterfront area now being primarily used for leisure purposes. However, some industry remains in the town including an ironworks and a timberyard/sawmill beside the Forth. The centre of the town contains several listed buildings and is part of a conservation area. The town is the home of the Museum of Scottish Railways and also a regional motor museum.

== Toponymy ==
The name Borrowstoun, from the Old English for "Beornweard's farm", refers to a hamlet a short way inland from Borrowstounness. The suffix ness, meaning "headland", serves to differentiate the two. The shortened form Bo'ness first appeared in the 18th century.

== History ==
=== Roman history ===
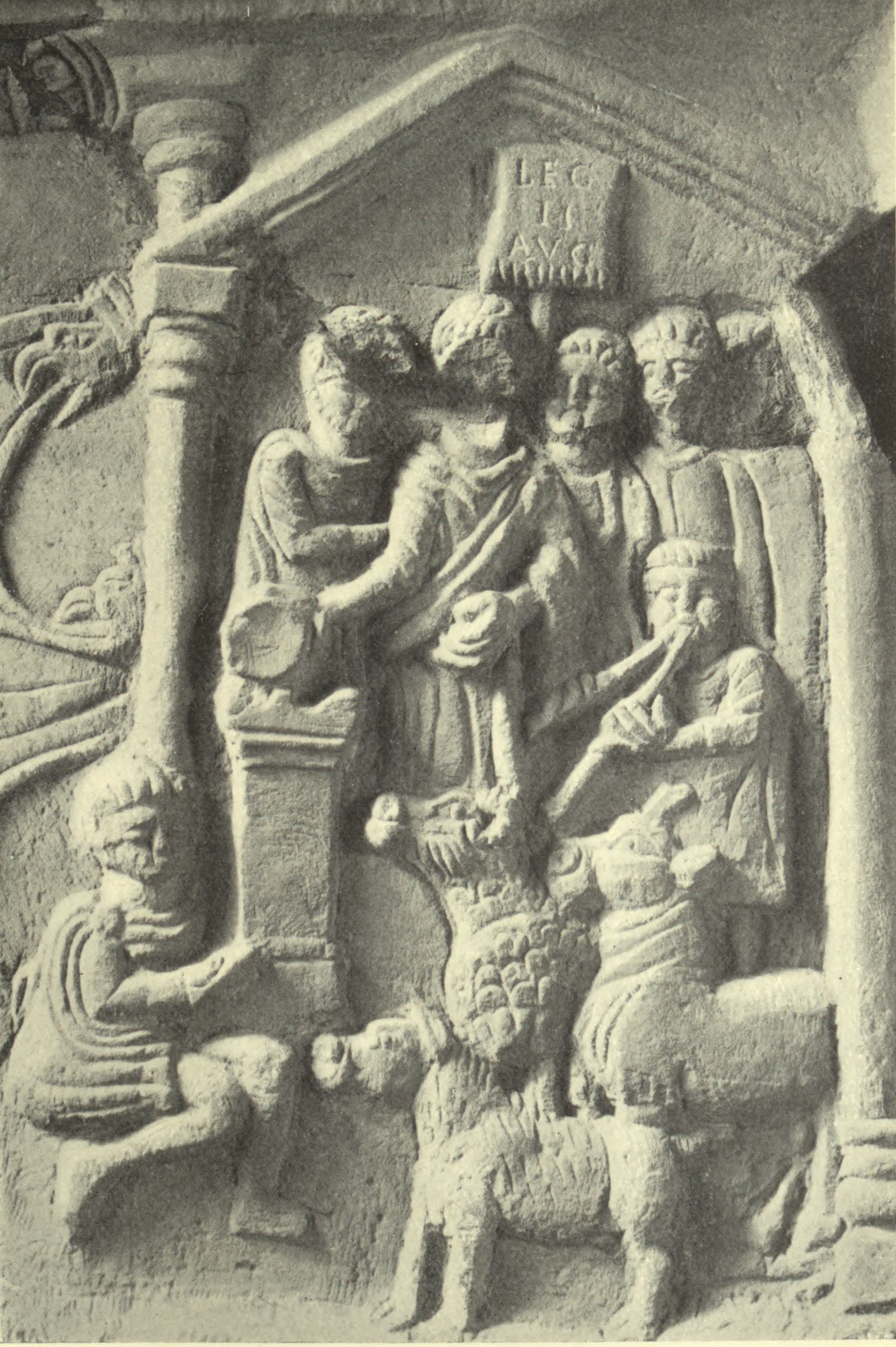
Right-hand panel of the Bridgeness Slab showing a suovetaurilia.

Bo'ness has important historical links to the Roman period and marks the eastern extent of the Antonine Wall (at Carriden in the north-east of Bo'ness) which stretched from Bo'ness to Old Kilpatrick on the west coast of Scotland. The Antonine Wall was named as an extension to the Frontiers of the Roman Empire World Heritage Site by UNESCO in July 2007. A Roman fortlet can still be seen at Kinneil to the west of Bo'ness.

Roman artefacts, some with inscriptions, have been found in the eastern part of the town at Carriden. A Roman fort called Veluniate, long since lost to history, once stood on the site now occupied by the grounds of Carriden House. Indeed, it is said that stones from the fort were used in the building of the mansion house.

Several artefacts have been uncovered over the years by the local farming community, including the Bridgeness Slab with many of them now on display in the National Museum of Scotland or at the Hunterian Museum in Glasgow. A replica was unveiled by Bo'ness Community Council and Falkirk Council on 7 September 2012 in Kinningars Park. A video about its history and manufacture is available online. Other Roman sites have been identified at Muirhouses (known locally as 'The Murrays') and Kinglass on the south-east side of the town.

=== Commerce and industrial ===
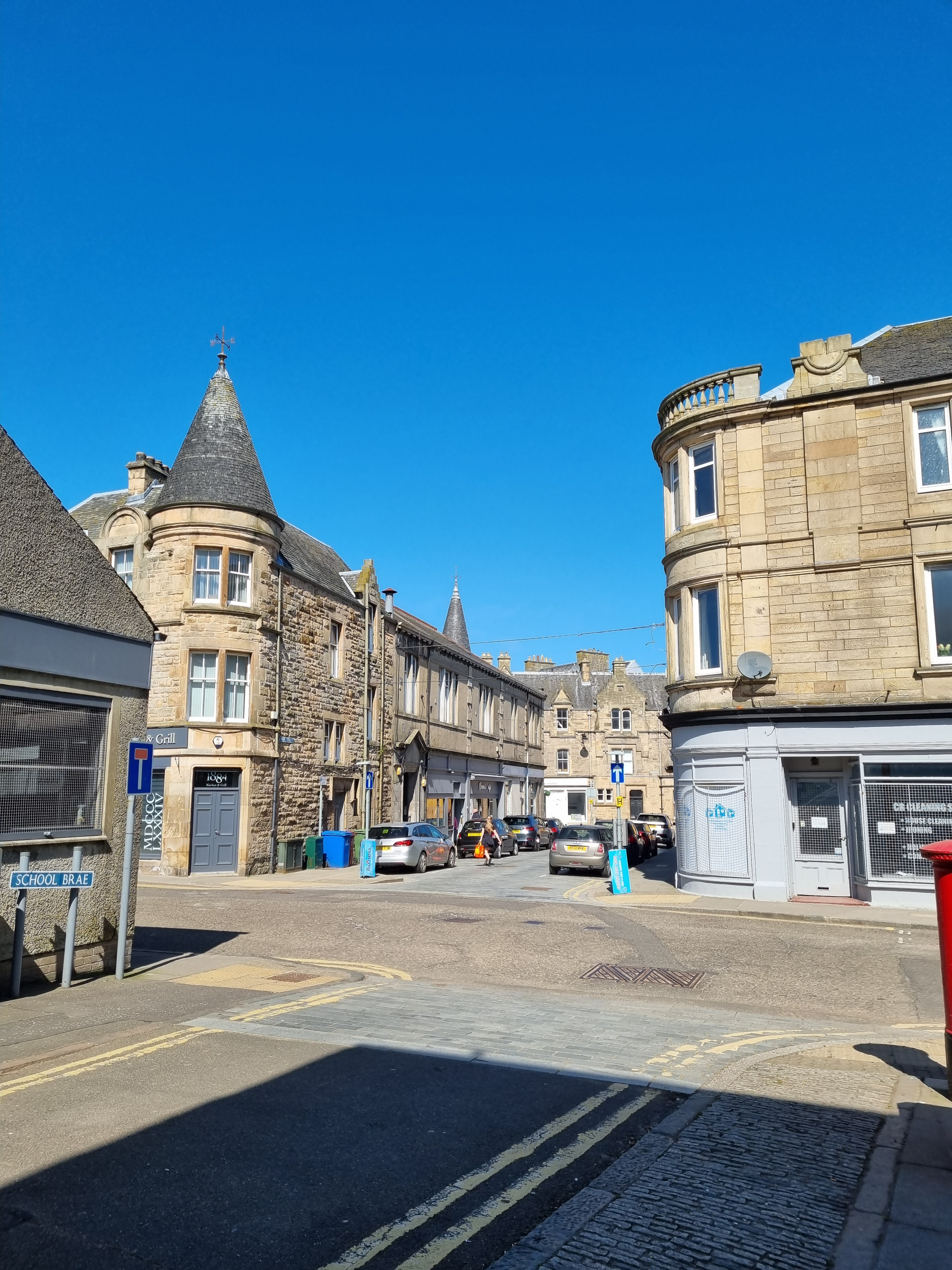
Bo'ness Town Centre, looking towards Hope St

The town was a recognised port from the 16th century. Coal was shipped from Bo'ness to supply Edinburgh Castle in 1548. A harbour was authorised by an Act of Parliament in 1707. The harbour, built in stages in the 18th century, was extended and complemented by a dry dock in 1881 (works designed by civil engineers Thomas Meik and Patrick Meik). The commercial port (heavily used for the transport of coal and pit props) eventually closed in 1959, badly affected by silting and the gradual downturn of the Scottish coal mining industry.

Plans currently exist for the regeneration of the docks area including reopening the port as a marina though these are on hold indefinitely. Shipowning and maritime businesses in the town is evidenced by the ownership of Kinneil, a ship owned by the Lovart Company of Bo’ness, that later sank in a collision off Denmark. Bo'ness was granted the right of exports and customs dues in 1672 and the office was transferred from Blackness. A large Customs House for the harbour was completed in 1880 on Union Street and still stands today as private dwellings.

Bo'ness was a site for coal mining from medieval times. Clay mining was carried out on a smaller scale. The shore was the site of industrial salt making, evaporating seawater over coal fires. The ruins of several fisheries (fish storage houses) along the shoreline evidences long gone commercial fishing activity. The town was also home to several sizable potteries, one product being the black 'wally dugs' which sat in pairs over many fireplaces. Metalworking is still carried out, and examples of the Bo'ness Iron Company's work are to be found in many places.

Kinneil Colliery was a large coal mine on the western edge of the town, that at its peak employed over 1,200 people. Production at the mine began in the late 19th century, expanded significantly after 1951 and was eventually merged with the Valleyfield Colliery via a tunnel underneath the Forth, connecting the two collieries. The mine closed in 1982 due to ‘severe geological conditions’. Today the above ground site is a nature reserve open to the public.

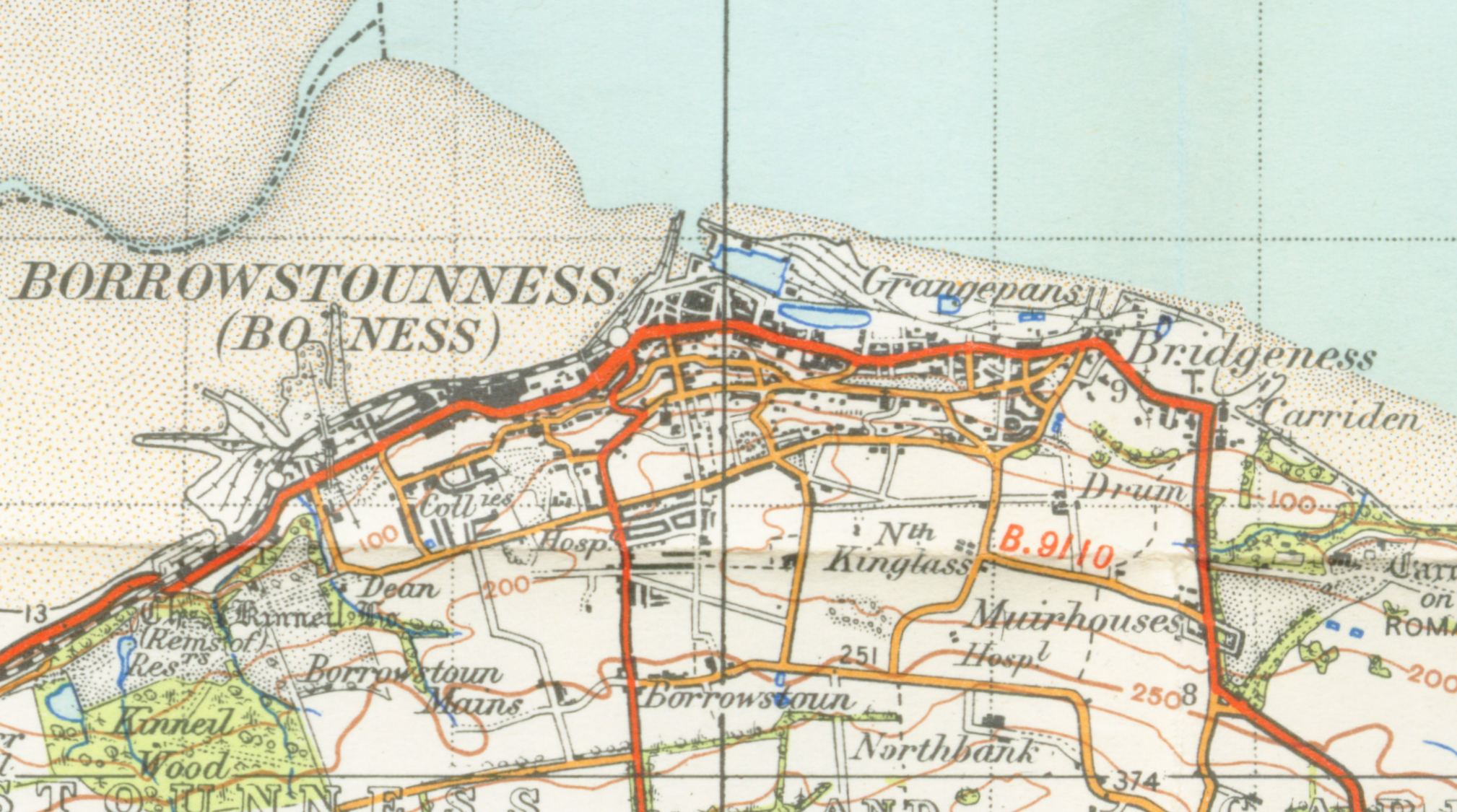
A map of Borrowstounness from 1945

When the town's commissioners bought the land for the Bo'ness Town Hall and park in the 1890s, the town's prosperity was on the rise. By its completion, the story was not so encouraging. Plans for the town hall and original library were approved however by the Dean of Guild Court on 14 October 1902. The building was officially opened on 14 September 1904. As part of the ceremony, a memorial stone was laid beneath which was placed a glass jar containing a copy of The Scotsman, The Glasgow Herald, Bo'ness Journal and Linlithgow Gazette, a list of councillors and a copy of the council minutes.

In the twentieth century Bo'ness was one of several Scottish ports involved in the shipbreaking industry. The shipbreaking yard was established by the Forth Ship Breaking Company (1902–20), which was then taken over by P&W Maclellan who continued operating until about 1970. On a high spring tide the ship destined to be broken up would be manoeuvred to the far (north) side of the river and then steamed across with all speed to drive her as far as possible up the beach. A fo’c’stle crew would lower the ship's anchors as soon as she came to rest to stop her sliding back into the river. The bows would come almost up to Bridgeness Road. Among many ships scrapped at the yard were the ocean liners Belgenland and Metagama, cargo ship Empire Advocate, and warships HMS Lagos, Liverpool, Newark, Petard, Ramsey, Scorpion and Wheatland.

The Bo'ness Journal and Linlithgow Gazette was a newspaper published in the town. It is now The Linlithgow Journal and Gazette. The newspaper officers were at 37–43 North Street which was built in 1884 and today is a category B listed building in the town.

== Economy and landmarks ==
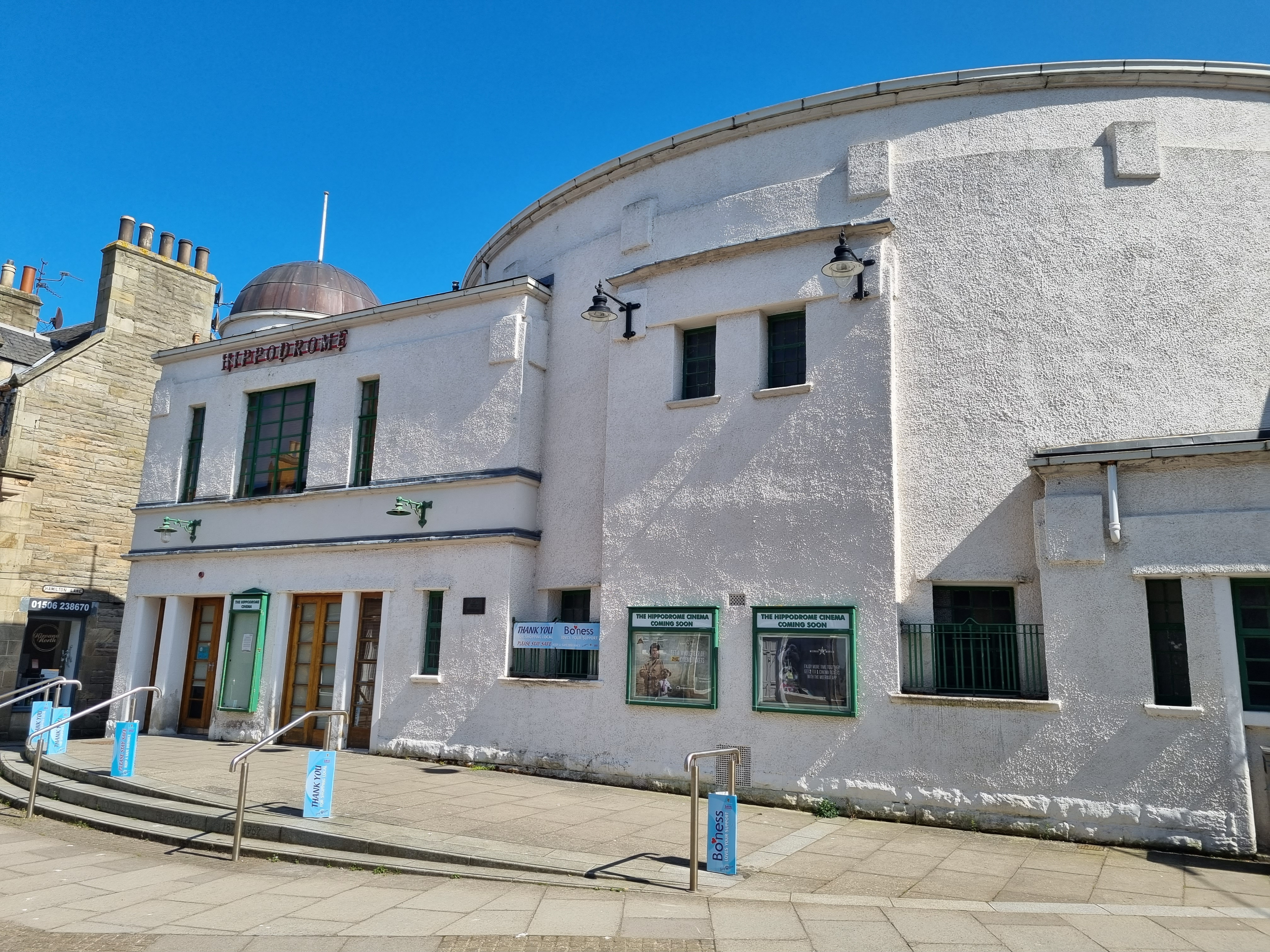
Bo'ness Hippodrome

Ballantine Bo'ness Iron Company and Ballantine Engineering is an ironworks company in Bo’ness. The company was founded in 1856 and has produced ironworks for bridges in the UK, including the fascia panels of Westminster Bridge and North Bridge in Edinburgh. The company went into administration in 2013 but was revived with government support as ‘Ballantine Castings’ in 2014. In 2019, the company produced ironwork replacements for the roof of the Palace of Westminster and Elizabeth Tower. Other industry in the town includes Walker timberyard and sawmill which is in Bo'ness beside the Forth on the Carriden Industrial Estate.

One of the main local employers is the Ineos petrochemical facility (formerly BP) in nearby Grangemouth.

Kinneil House is a historic house to the west of Bo'ness now in the care of Historic Scotland. It sits within a public park, which also incorporates a section of the Roman Antonine Wall. Kinneil was mentioned by Bede, who wrote that it was named Pennfahel ('Wall's end') in Pictish and Penneltun in Old English. It was also Pengwawl in old Welsh. In the grounds of Kinneil House is the ruin of the small cottage where James Watt worked on his experimental steam engine and the steam cylinder of a Newcomen engine. The remains of an engine house are in Kinningars Park, off Harbour Road.

Dymock's Building is a Category A listed 17th-century former merchant's house, finished in orange harling. The house was restored in the late 1990s under the management of the National Trust for Scotland and the Pollock Hammond partnership. It is now used as social housing, being split into 8 separate dwellings.

== Culture ==
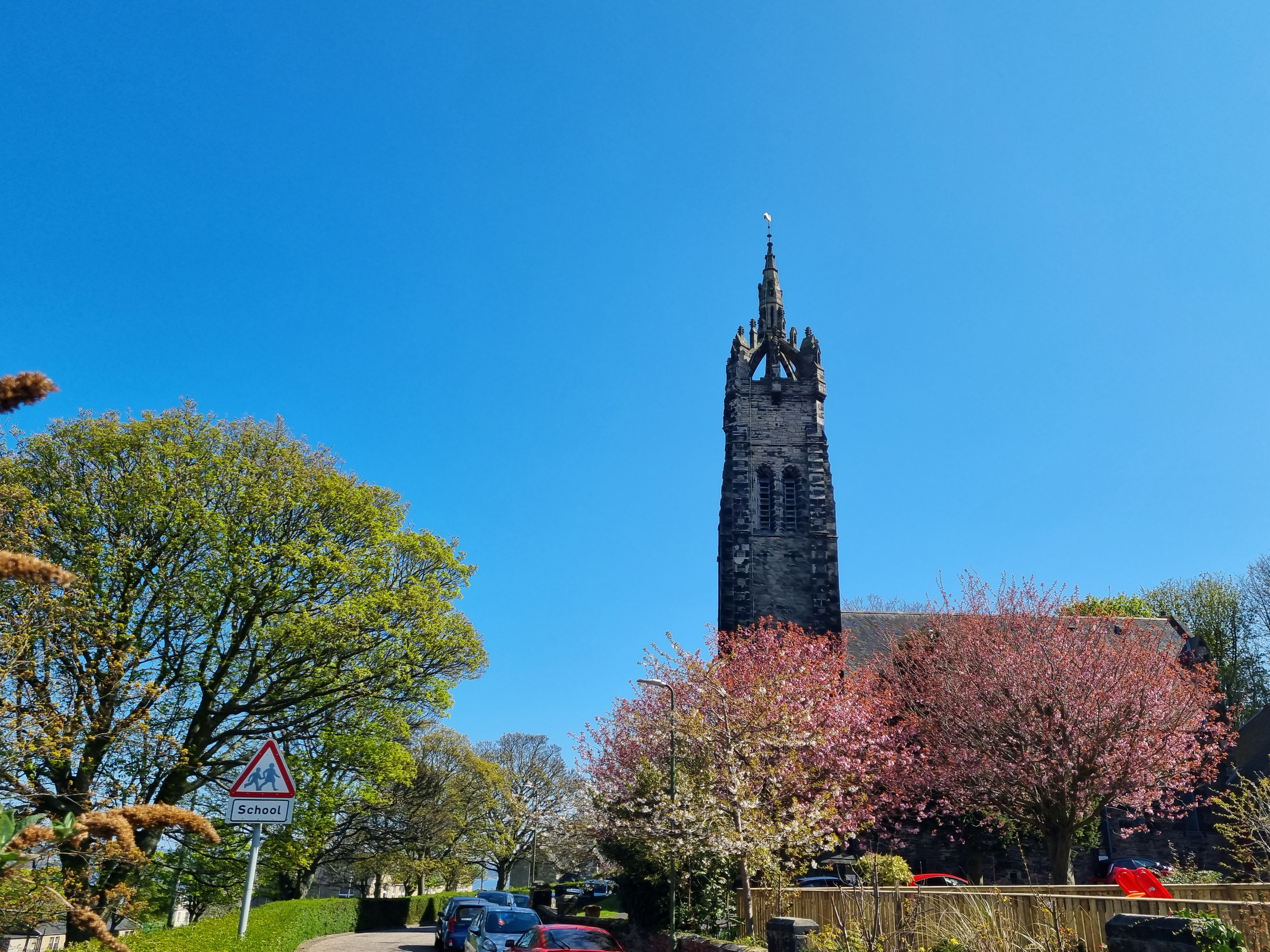
Craigmailen Church, Braehead

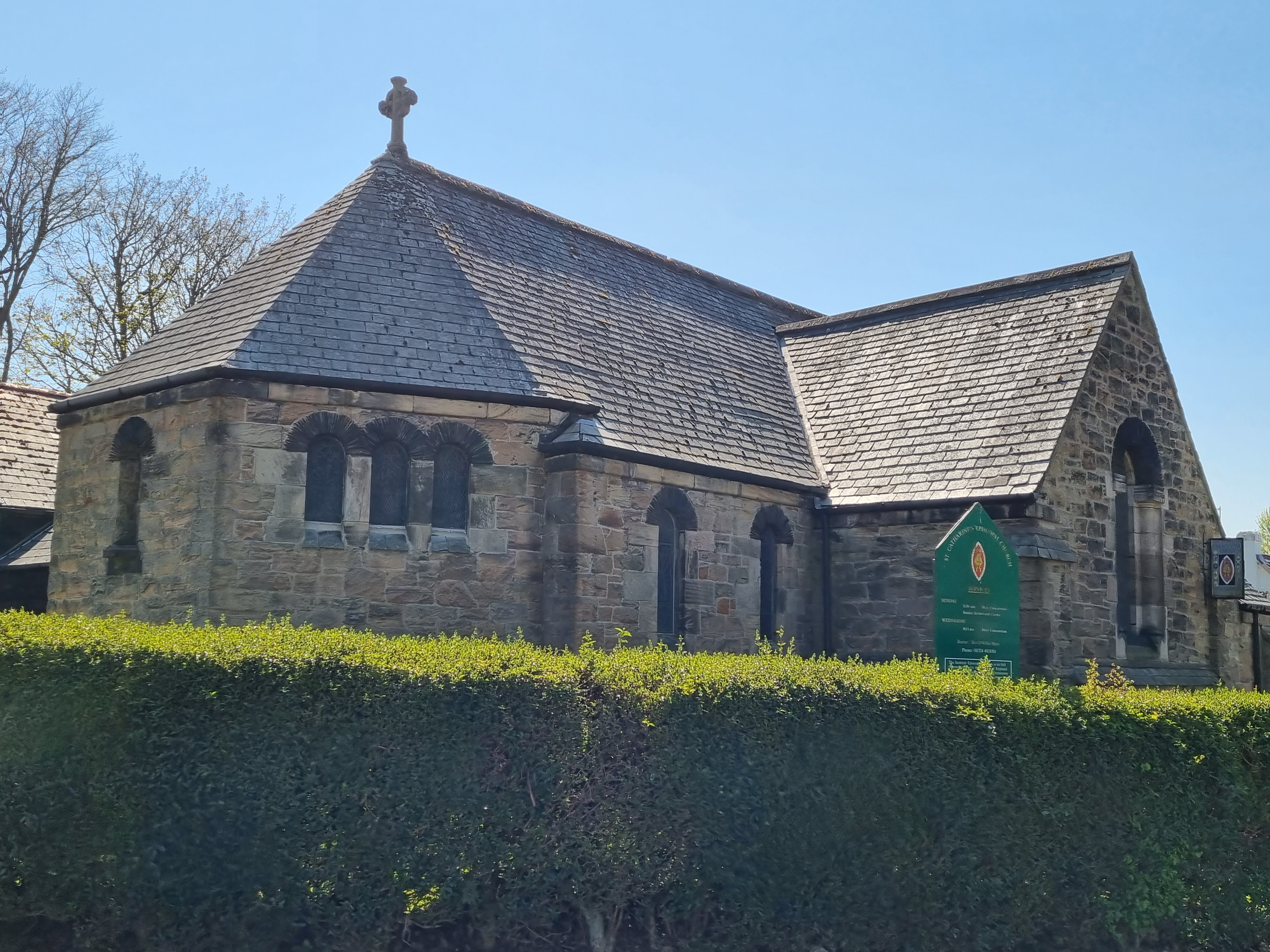
St Catharine's Episcopal church

=== Community and culture ===
Bo'ness is now primarily a commuter town, with many of its residents travelling to work in Edinburgh, Glasgow or Falkirk. Present-day attractions in the town include the Bo'ness and Kinneil Railway, the Birkhill Fireclay Mine and the local motor museum. Kinneil House, built by the powerful Hamilton family in the 15th century, lies on the western edge of the town.

Bo'ness is also home to the recently refurbished Hippodrome Cinema, which is the oldest picture house in Scotland. The building, along with many other buildings in Bo'ness, was designed by Matthew Steele, a local resident and architect. The Hippodrome was built in 1912. Some footage of it survives from 1950 during the Bo'ness Children's Fair Festival. The Bo'ness Children's Fair Festival continues to this day, covered by Valley FM, a local radio station that broadcasts for a limited number of days each year to cover the festival.

The town's war memorial is on a hill overlooking the Forth on Stewart Avenue. The war memorial is in the form of a large granite obelisk and was unveiled on 12 July 1924, with later plaques added after the Second World War. The town also has a commemorative clock and lantern, erected in 1985 through donations from the Linlithgow and Bo'ness Rotary Club.

The current Bo'ness library is in a restored early 18th-century building (previously the West Pier Tavern) on Scotland Street. The previous Carnegie library was in the Town Hall but moved to its current home in 1980 once conversions were completed.

=== Religion ===
There are a number of churches, including Bo'ness Old Kirk, Carriden Parish Church, St Andrew's Parish Church, Craigmailen United Free Church, St. Catharine's Episcopal Church, Bo'ness Apostolic Church, Bo'ness Baptist Church, The Bo'ness Salvation Army and St. Mary of the Assumption Roman Catholic Church. Rev Albert Bogle, minister at the town's St Andrew's Church, was the Moderator of the General Assembly of the Church of Scotland for 2012 to 2013. Craigmailen United Free Church is a Victorian Gothic church constructed between 1883 and 1885 and designed by the architects McKissack & Rowan. Bo'ness Old Kirk is a Victorian church that was completed in the Corbiehall area of the town in 1888 and that replaced a much older church building.

=== Sport ===
Bo'ness is home to the football club Bo'ness United, and also to Bo'ness United Ladies and Bo'ness United Under 16s. A large fire damaged Bo'ness United's football ground in June 2019. It was the home to Bo'ness F.C. until 1932.

Bo'ness Academy has a rugby team. Bo'ness RFC has had its first ever rugby club established in September 2011. Bo'ness Cycling Club was reformed in 2010 as Velo Sport Bo'ness. Jim Smellie was 11 times Scottish Cycling Champion, and some of the trophies collected over the years can be viewed at Kinneil House Museum.

Bo'ness has also played an important role in British motorsport. Hillclimb events, including the first ever round of the British Hill Climb Championship and several thereafter, were held on a course on the Kinneil estate most years from 1932 until 1966. Since 2008, an annual Revival event for classic road-going and competition cars has been held on approximately the same course. Bo'ness Hill Climb is a hillclimbing course on the Kinneil Estate (site of the historic Kinneil House).

=== Parks ===
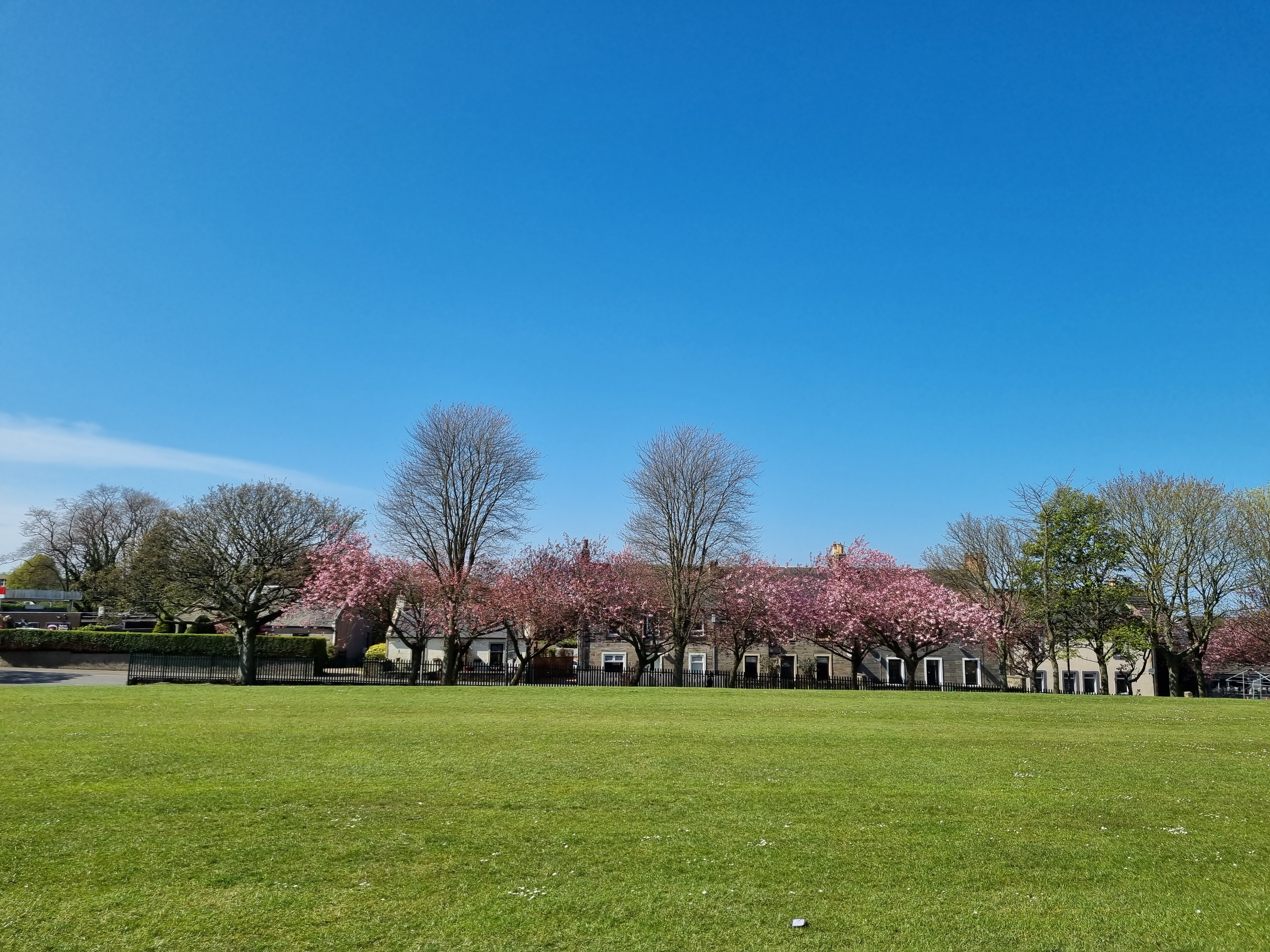
Douglas Park in Bo'ness looking west

Bo'ness has several community parks and recreation grounds. Douglas Park is one of the largest parks in Bo'ness, it has views looking across the River Forth and includes a children's play area, football fields and a pavilion. The park was the site of a geophysics survey in 2020 that identified two prehistoric round barrows underneath the park. Glebe Park is a small formal park in the town centre adjacent to Bo'ness Town Hall, with a Bandstand at its centre that was constructed in 1902 by the Walter McFarlane & Co Saracen Foundry and which is now on the Buildings at Risk Register for Scotland.

== Education ==
Bo'ness has a single secondary school, Bo'ness Academy. There are five primary schools: Kinneil, Deanburn, Bo'ness Public School, St Mary's, and the Grange School.

== Notable people ==
- George Baird, minister
- Reverend William White Anderson, Moderator of the General Assembly of the Church of Scotland, 1888–1956
- Patricia Bagot, housing specialist
- John Begg, architect
- Euan Morton, actor, singer
- Henry Cadell, geologist
- George Denholm, Battle of Britain fighter pilot
- George W. Easton, athlete
- James Gardiner (British Army officer), redcoat
- Jo Gibb, actor
- Christine Grant, athletics director, University of Iowa
- James Hamilton, 1st Lord Hamilton
- Margaret Kidd, advocate
- Henrietta Elizabeth Marshall, children's writer
- Michael Potter, minister and prisoner on the Bass Rock
- James Brunton Stephens, Australian poet
- Harcus Strachan, Canadian soldier, and winner of the Victoria Cross
- William Young (1761–1847), Royal Navy
- Charles Clough, a prominent geologist and mapmaker who was struck by a train to the south-west of Bo’ness; he subsequently died four days later in August 1916
