= Lawrence Macdonald =

Scottish sculptor (1799–1878)

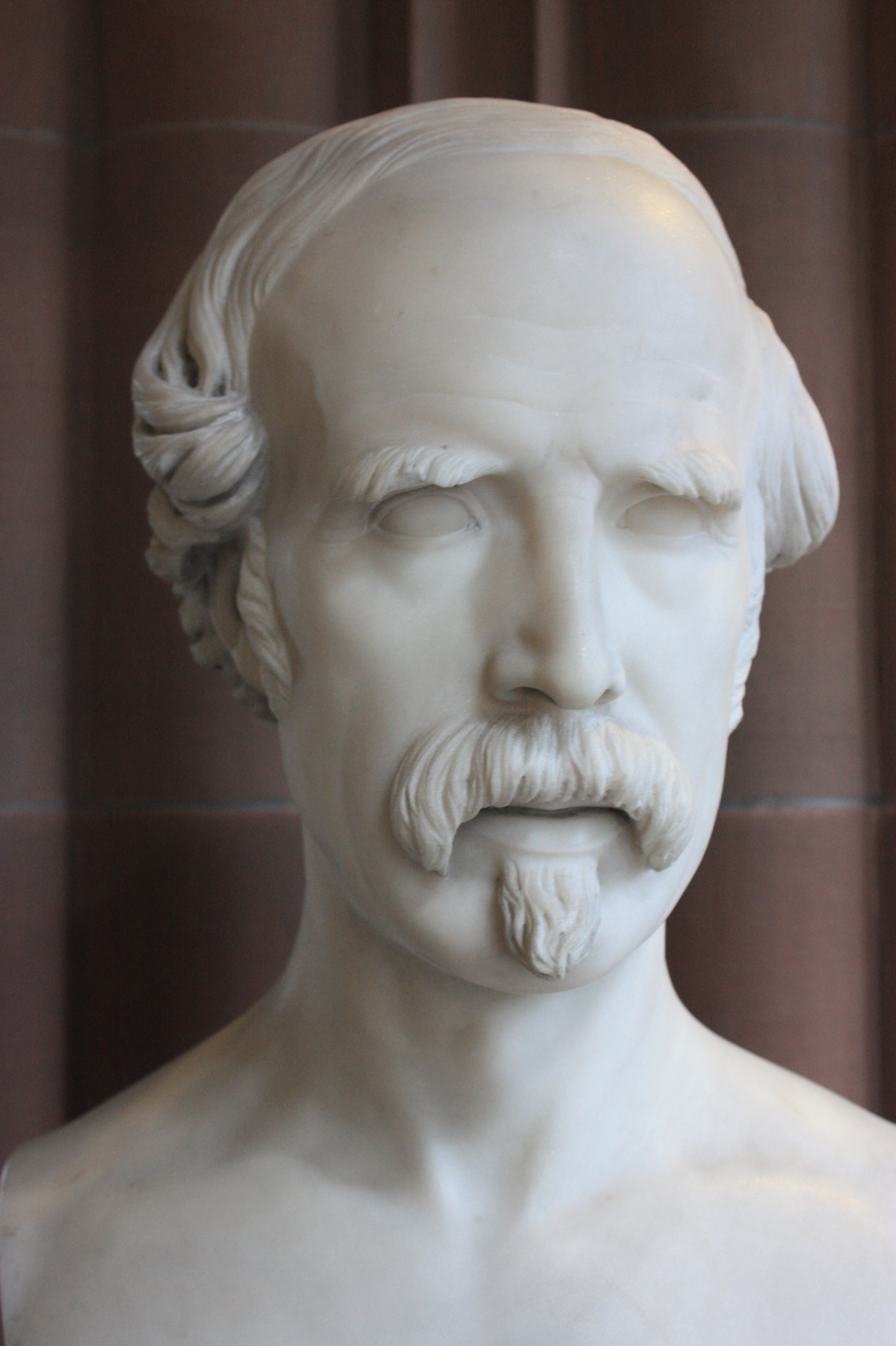
Lawrence Macdonald by John Hutchison 1860

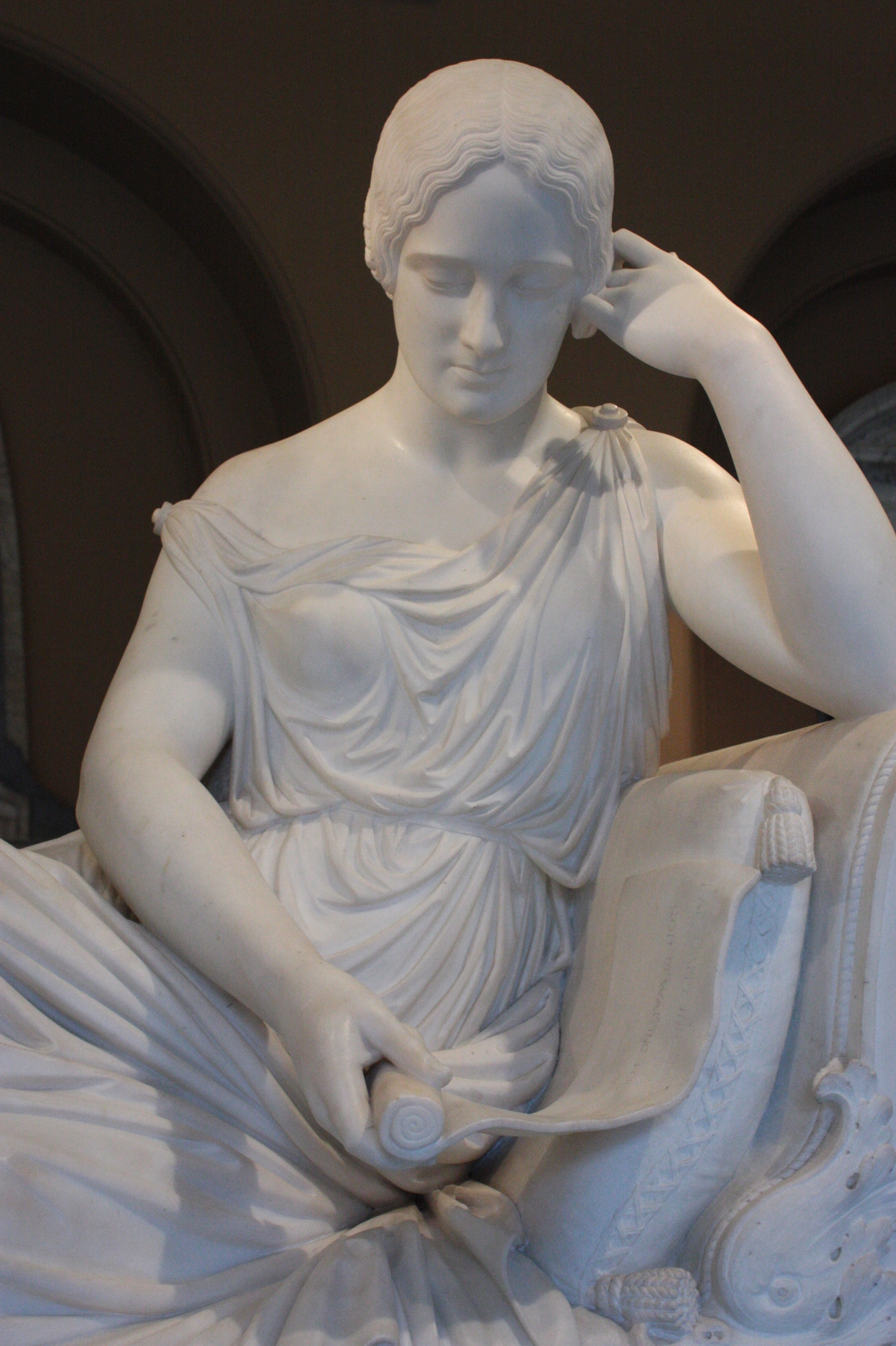
Monument to Emily Georgiana, Countess of Winchilsea (detail) by Lawrence MacDonald, 1850, Victoria and Albert Museum

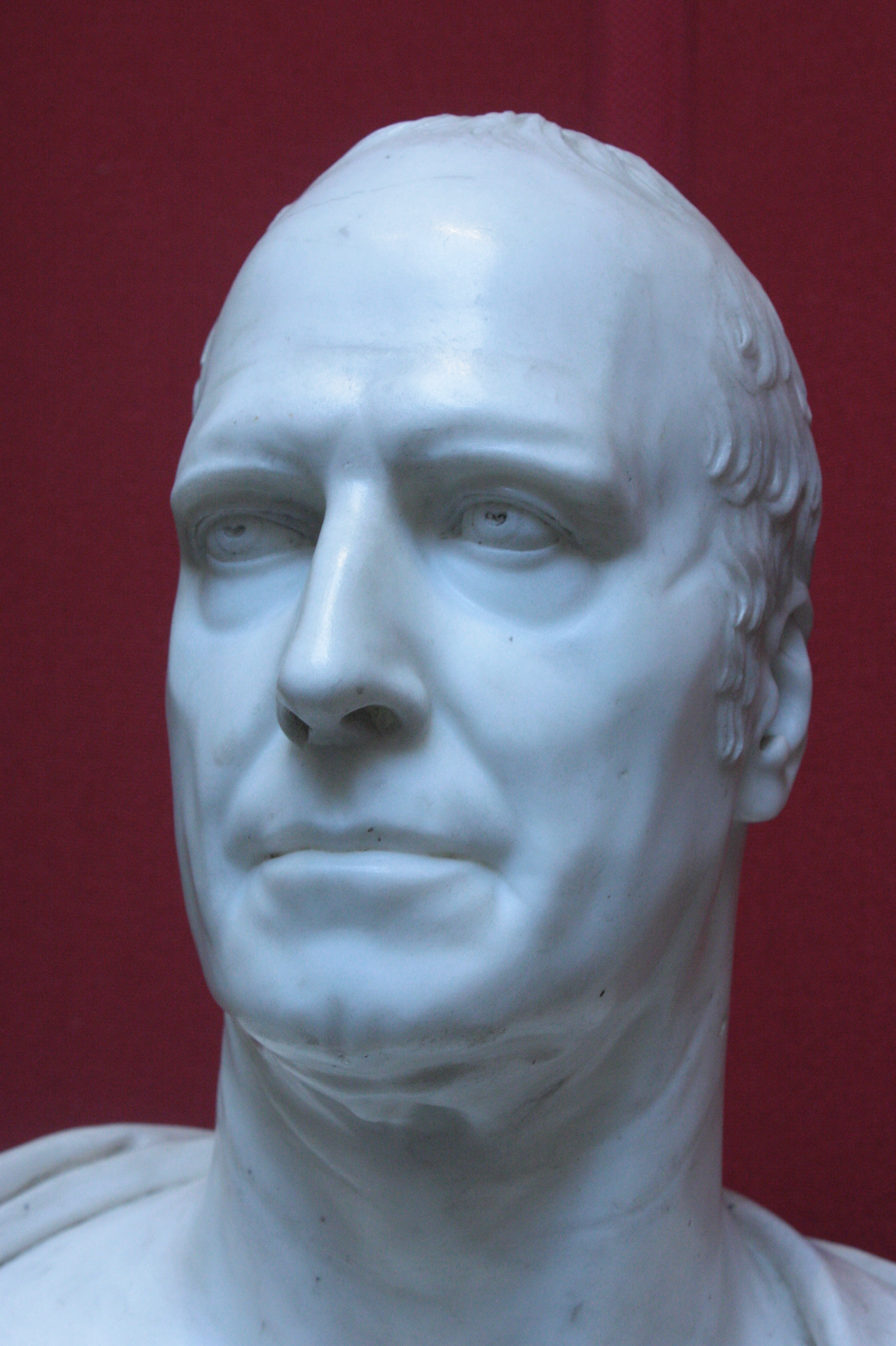
General Sir David Baird by Lawrence Macdonald 1828

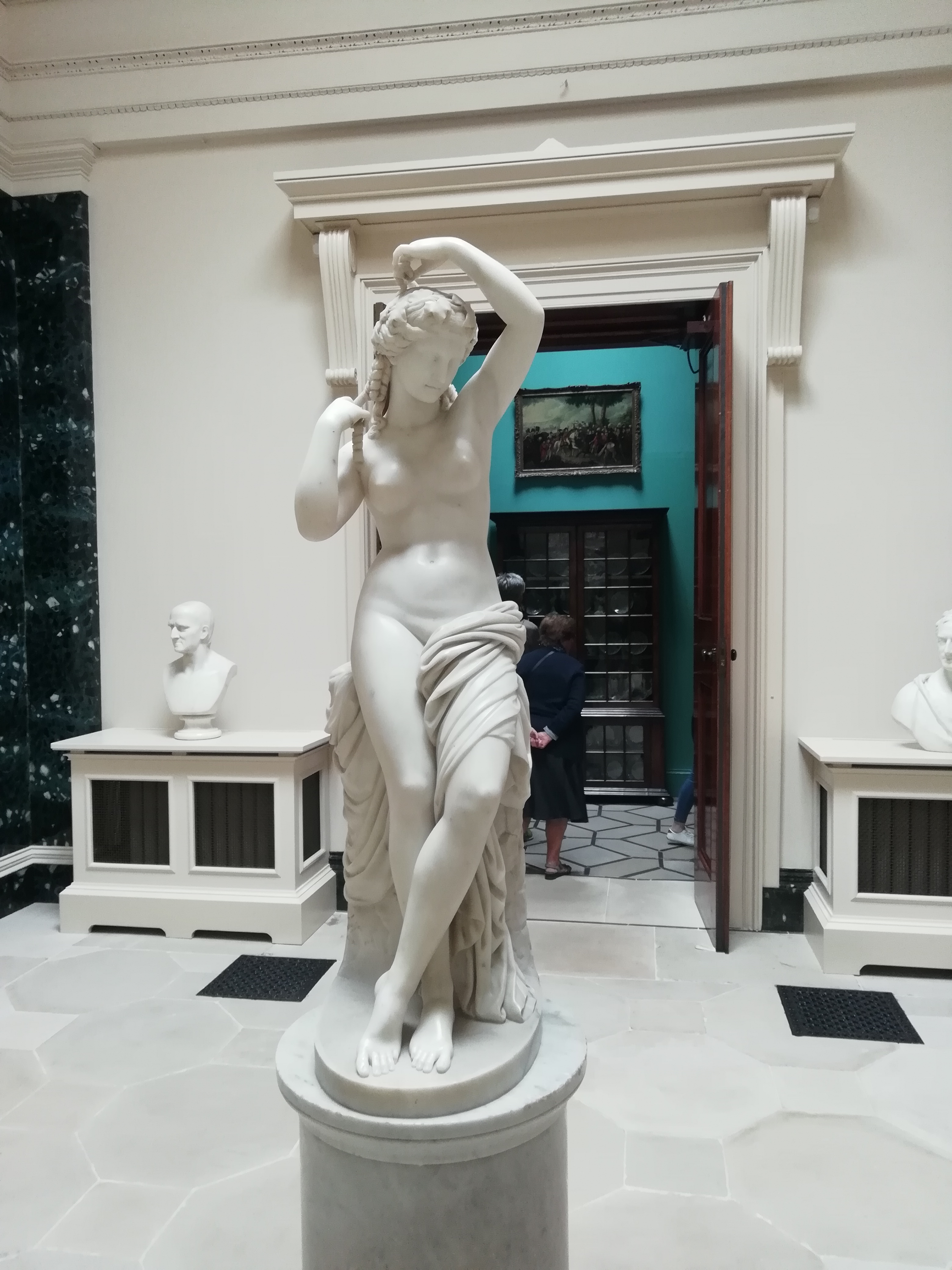
Bacchante at the Bath by Lawrence Macdonald 1856

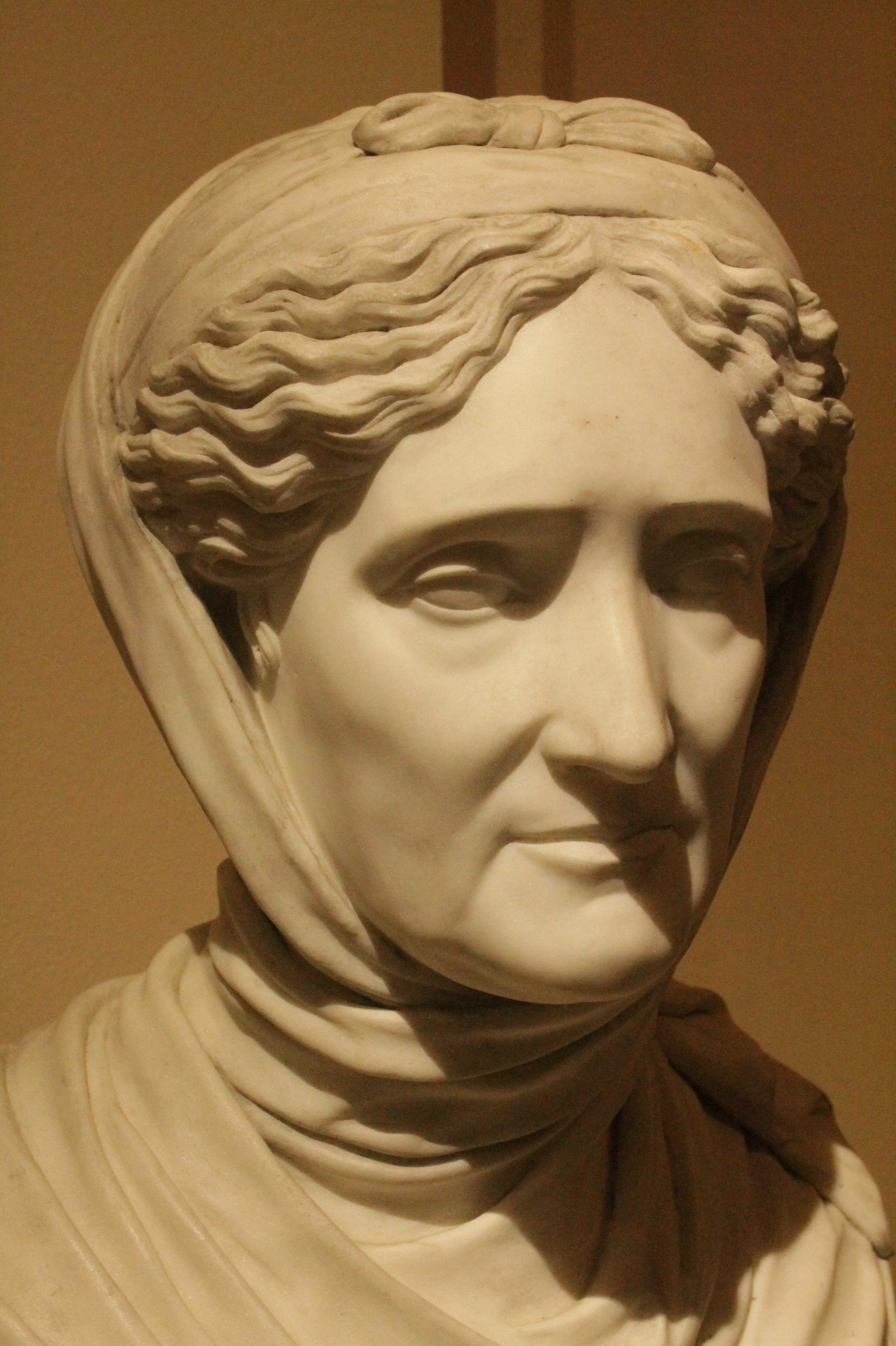
Bust of Euphemia Murray by Lawrence MacDonald c.1850

Lawrence Macdonald sometimes Laurence Macdonald (15 February 1799 – 4 March 1878) was a Scottish sculptor.

== Life ==
Macdonald was born on 15 February 1799 at Findo Gask in Perthshire, Scotland to Margaret Morison, a nurse, and Alexander Macdonald, a violinist.

He was apprenticed as a stonemason with Thomas Gibson, who was then building the Murray Royal Asylum, outside Perth. Around this time he was also commissioned by Robert Graeme, the laird of Garvock to carve a coat of arms on the front of Garvock House. Macdonald then travelled to Edinburgh with a letter of introduction from Graeme to the architect James Gillespie Graham. On 26 February 1822 he entered the Trustees' Academy, Edinburgh. During this time he also worked as a decoratorative carver for Gillespie Graham.

In late 1822 he travelled to France with the Oliphant family of Gask. He then went to Rome where he set up a workshop and remained for the next three years. While there he executed several busts, among others that of the John Murray, 4th Duke of Atholl. In 1823, along with Gibson, Severn, and other artists, he founded the British Academy of Arts in Rome, of which he continued as a trustee until his death.

He returned to Edinburgh in 1826 and exhibited work at the Institution for the Encouragement of the Fine Arts. He also produced busts of Professor John Wilson and George Combe, the phrenologist and founder of the Edinburgh Phrenological Society, for which MacDonald produced work.

In 1829, he sent his bust of John Marshall, MP, to the Royal Academy, and he was a frequent contributor to the succeeding exhibitions. In the autumn of 1829, he exhibited in the Royal Institution, Edinburgh, his colossal group of 'Ajax bearing the dead body of Patroclus and combating 'an warrior' and other works; and he was second to his friend Charles Maclaren, editor of The Scotsman in his bloodless duel with Dr. James Browne, editor of the Caledonian Mercury, fought near Edinburgh in November 1829, which arose partly out of an article in the Mercury (6 November) on Macdonald's works and the Scotsman's criticisms upon them. In the same year he was elected a member of the Scottish Academy, where in 1832, he exhibited several busts, including those of John Gibson Lockhart and the Earl of Erroll; but he seldom contributed here, and resigned his membership in 1858. He appeared in the list of honorary members in 1867. At this time he is shown as living at 10 Cumberland Street in Edinburgh's Second New Town.

In 1832 he returned to Rome, where he occupied a leading position as a sculptor, chiefly producing portrait busts, aided by his elder brother, John, and his son, Alexander. His bust of Philip Stanhope, 5th Earl Stanhope, is now at Chevening, Kent, and a copy is in the National Portrait Gallery, London.

He also executed busts of Walter Scott (1831), Fanny Kemble, and Sir David Baird. and James Gillespie Graham. Among his ideal works are 'A Girl and a Carrier Pigeon,’ (1835), and 'Eurydice,’ (1849). His 'Ulysses recognised by his dog,’ shown in the Paris Exhibition of 1855, was much admired, and became the property of Lord Kilmorey.

He died in Rome on 4 March 1878.

Several sculptors trained under him, including William Brodie.

== Principal works ==
Although Macdonald made statues of classical and mythological figures, all his portraiture was in the form of busts.

- James Gillespie Graham (1827)
- The Duke of Atholl, Blair Atholl, (1827)
- Robert Phillips, (1829)
- Earl of Errol (1832)
- Viscountess Canning, Highcliffe Castle (1838)
- Lord Alexander Russell, Woburn Abbey (1839)
- Lady Ebury, Apsley House (1839)
- Lord Charles Montagu, Kimbolton Castle (1840)
- Sir Henry Taylor, National Portrait Gallery, London (1843)
- Lord Compton, Castle Ashby (1843)
- Mary Somerville, (1844)
- The Duke of Cambridge, Windsor Castle (1846)
- The Hon Mrs Sidney Herbert, Wilton House (1848)
- Statue of Hyacinthus, Windsor Castle (1852)
- Duke of Northumberland (1853)
- Earl Stanhope, Chevening House, Kent (1854)
- Bacchante at the Bath, Mount Stewart (1856)
- Venus at the Bath, Mount Stewart (1856)
- Watts Russell, Church of the Holy Cross, Ilam, Staffordshire (1863)
- Earl Stanhope, Chevening, Kent (n.d.)
- George Combe, Scottish National Portrait Gallery (n.d.)
- Euphemia Murray, Perth Museum (n.d.)

== In literature ==
Letitia Elizabeth Landon published her poem Lines. Supposed to be the Prayer of the Supplicating Nymph in Mr. Lawrence Macdonald’s Exhibition of Sculptures in the Literary Gazette in 1831.

== Sources ==
- Roscoe, Ingrid (2009). A Biographical Dictionary of Sculptors in Britain, 1660-1851.
- Drummond, P. R. (1879). Perthshire in Bygone Days.

Attribution: This article incorporates text from a publication now in the public domain: Gray, John Miller (1893). "Macdonald, Lawrence". In Lee, Sidney (ed.). Dictionary of National Biography. Vol. 35. London: Smith, Elder & Co.
