= Baggott =

Baggott is a surname. Notable people with the surname Baggott or Baggot include:

- Elkan Baggott (born 2002), Indonesian footballer
- Jack Baggott (1906–1995), Australian rules footballer
- Jim Baggott (born 1957), British science writer
- Julianna Baggott (born 1969), American novelist and poet
- Louis Baggott (1891–1965), Anglican priest
- Martin Baggott, a member of the Applejacks
- Matthew D. Baggott (born 1959), Chief Constable of the Police Service of Northern Ireland
- Matthew J. Baggott, an American neuroscientist
- Ron Baggott (1917–2013), Australian rules footballer

== See also ==
- Baggott Ridge in Antarctica
- Baggot Street in Ireland
