= Mount Bagot =

Mountain in Canada and the United States

- Boundary Peak 107
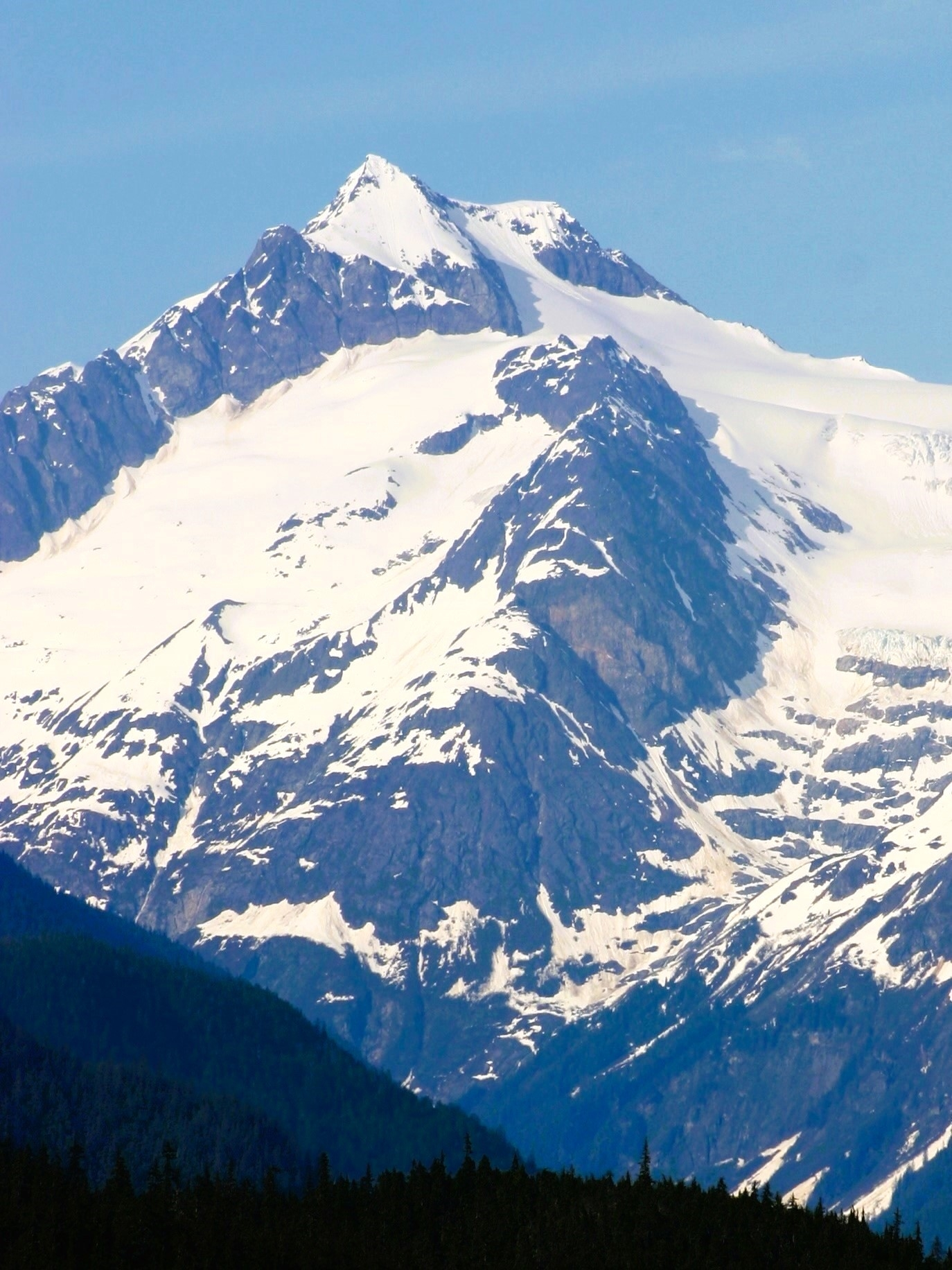
- Southwest aspect

Highest point
- Elevation: 2,181 m (7,156 ft)
- Prominence: 801 m (2,628 ft)
- Isolation: 6.51 km (4.05 mi)
- Coordinates: 59°20′54″N 135°01′29″W

Naming
- Etymology: Charles Bagot

Geography
- Location within Alaska Location within British Columbia
- Interactive map of Mount Bagot
- Countries: Canada; United States
- Province: British Columbia
- State: Alaska
- Parent range: Coast Mountains; Boundary Ranges
- Topo map(s): NTS 104M6 Mount Bagot; USGS Skagway B-1

Climbing
- First ascent: 1967

Mount Bagot is a 2,181-metre (7,156-foot) mountain summit located on, and in part defining, the international border between British Columbia, Canada, and Alaska, United States.

== Description ==
Mount Bagot, also known as Boundary Peak 107, is located in the Boundary Ranges of the Coast Mountains. The true summit is set 200 metres inside Canada and the lower Southwest Peak (7,087+ ft, 2,160+ m) lies directly on the border, 0.25 mi (0.40 km) from the main summit. The Southwest Peak is situated 13 miles (21 km) southeast of Skagway on the boundary shared by Haines Borough and Skagway Borough, and on land managed by Tongass National Forest. Although modest in elevation, relief is significant as the west slope rises 1,720 metres (5,650 ft) in two kilometres (1.2 mile). Precipitation runoff and glacial meltwater from the mountain drains to Lynn Canal via the Katzehin River. The nearest higher neighbor is the Sawtooth Range, four miles (6.5 km) to the north. The first ascent of the summit was made on August 31, 1967, by Kenneth Carpenter, Ron Miller, Margaret Piggott, and Mike Wiley.

== Etymology ==
The mountain was named jointly by the United States and Canada to honor Sir Charles Bagot (1781–1843), British Ambassador to Russia and plenipotentiary at St. Petersburg in 1822 during negotiations regarding the Alaska boundary. He was the British Minister to the United States (1815–1820) and negotiated the Rush–Bagot Treaty in 1817. He served as Governor General of Canada from 1841 through 1843. The toponym was officially adopted on May 2, 1923, by the U.S. Board on Geographic Names, and on March 31, 1924, by the Geographical Names Board of Canada.

== Climate ==
Based on the Köppen climate classification, Mount Bagot is located in a tundra climate zone with cold, snowy winters, and cool summers. Weather systems coming off the Gulf of Alaska are forced upwards by the Coast Mountains (orographic lift), causing heavy precipitation in the form of rainfall and snowfall. Winter temperatures can drop below −20 °C with wind chill factors below −30 °C. This climate supports the Denver Glacier and other unnamed glaciers of the Juneau Icefield surrounding the mountain.

== Gallery ==
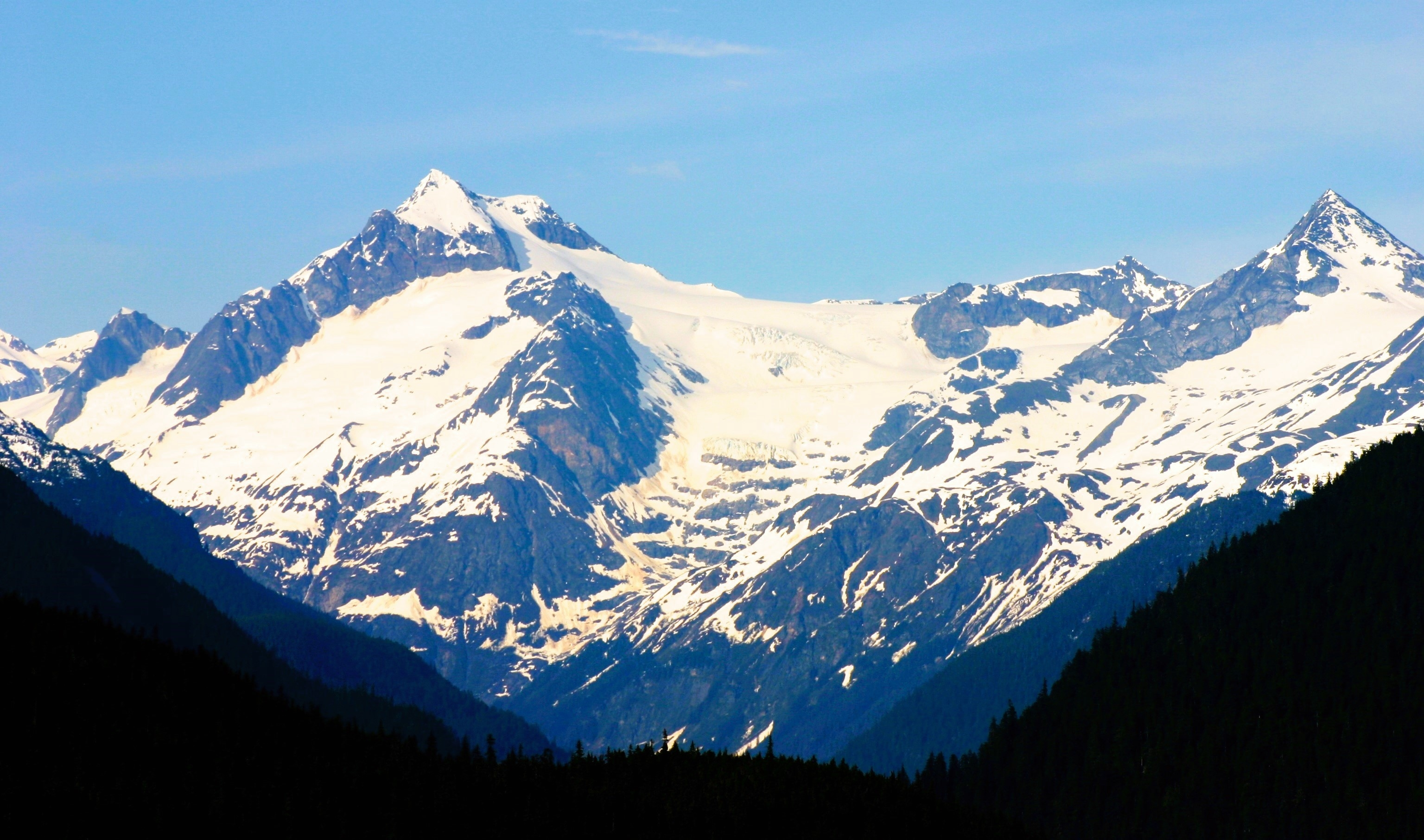
Mount Bagot (left) viewed looking through the Katzehin River Valley

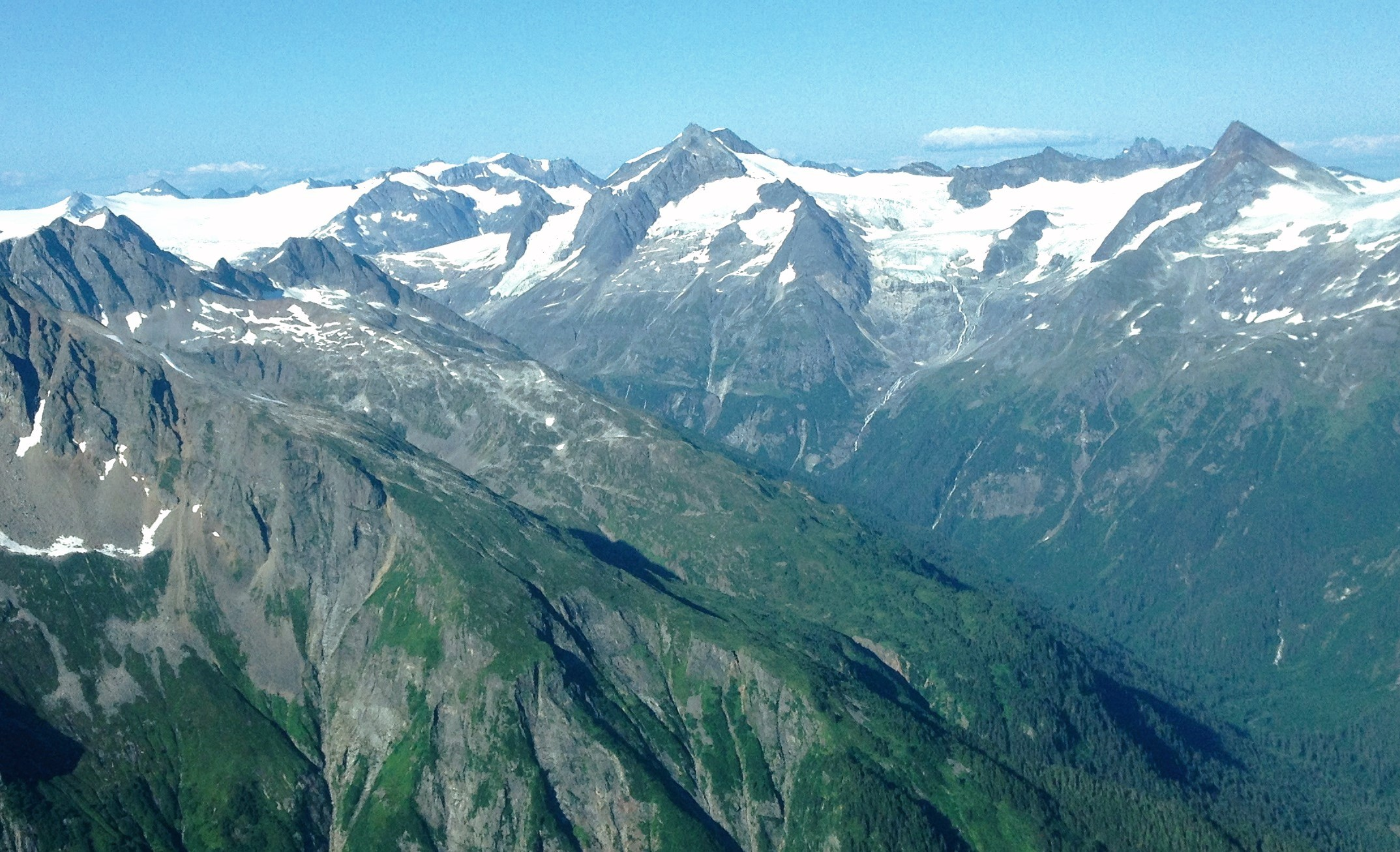
Aerial view of southwest aspect of Mt. Bagot centered on the skyline

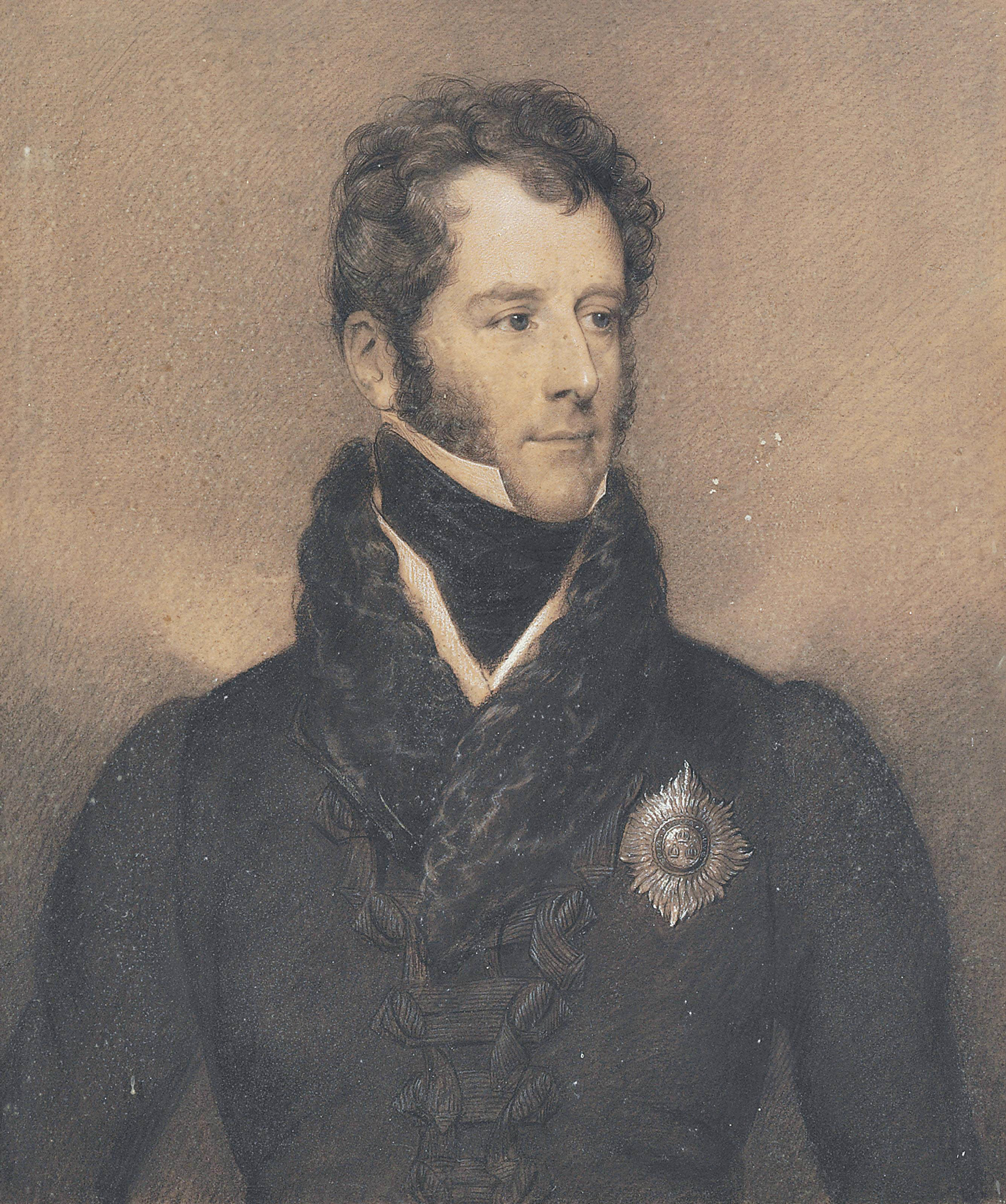
Charles Bagot in 1825

== See also ==
- Geography of Alaska
- List of Boundary Peaks of the Alaska–British Columbia/Yukon border
