= Patricia Bagot =

Patricia Bagot OBE
- Born: 6 October 1942; Bo’ness, Scotland
- Died: 28 January 2007 (aged 64)
- Education: University of Edinburgh; University of Sheffield
- Occupation: Housing expert

Patricia Fraser Bagot OBE (6 October 1942 – 28 January 2007) was a Scottish housing specialist who received an OBE for services to housing. She is considered "one of the influential writers on the sociology of housing."

== Early life ==
Bagot's parents were Captain Arthur Bagot and Mary Bagot, and she was born in Bo'ness. She studied at Leith Academy, Edinburgh, and Mary Erskine School. Bagot was awarded a MA from the University of Edinburgh in psychology and philosophy and then received a Diploma from The University of Sheffield in sociological studies.

== Career ==
After graduation Bagot took up a post as a child care officer for Midlothian and East Lothian, and joined Peebles Children's Committee in 1964. Her interest in housing arose when she transferred to the architectural research unit of the University of Edinburgh in 1968. In the early 1970s, Bagot conducted work examining issues such as housing tenure.

Following this, Bagot joined Robert Matthews, Johnston Marshall & Partners as a planner, developing housing in Tripoli, Libya. During her work in this role, Bagot argued with Libyan leader Colonel Muammar Gaddafi about proposed housing as she was concerned that it was not of sufficient quality, and at one point also smuggled architectural plans across the border in a Persian rug.

Bagot returned to Scotland in 1979 to take up a post in the Scottish Special Housing Association (SSHA). She held a number of senior positions in the SSHA and its successor, Scottish Homes, where she helped to establish HomePoint, a national housing advice project.

Bagot was a member of the Scottish Executive's Homelessness Taskforce and later was a key figure in establishing an internet directory of housing support services called HouseKey. In the 2005 Birthday Honours, Bagot was appointed an Officer of the Order of the British Empire for services to housing.

During the final year of her life, Bagot focussed on a review of housing for older people, working with Communities Minister Malcolm Chisholm.

== Publications ==
- A Comparative Study of Three Forms of Housing Tenure, 1979

== Death ==
Bagot died on 6 October 2007 after a short illness.
