= Hundred of Bagot =

The Hundred of Bagot refers to a cadastral unit. It could be

- Hundred of Bagot (Northern Territory)
- Hundred of Bagot (South Australia)
