= Valley FM (Scotland) =

- Bo'ness; Scotland
- Broadcast area: The Area Of Falkirk, Grangemouth, Bo'ness & Linlithgow

History
- First air date: 20 June 2005

Links
- Website: http://www.valleyfm.org.uk

Valley FM (87.9) was a radio station in Bo'ness, Scotland. It broadcast for a limited number of days each year in connection with the annual Bo'ness Children's Fair. In 2015 they celebrated their 10th annual broadcast, known as V10. To commemorate the special broadcast Valley FM posted their statistics: 2408 Hours Broadcast, 9749 songs played and a total of 7798 listeners.
