= Rosemary Bagot =

Canadian neuroscientist

Rosemary C. Bagot (born 1981) is a Canadian neuroscientist who researches the mechanisms of altered brain function in depression. She is an assistant professor in behavioral neuroscience in the Department of Psychology at McGill University in Montreal, Canada. Her focus in behavioral neuroscience is on understanding the mechanisms of altered brain circuit function in depression. Employing a multidisciplinary approach, Bagot investigates why only some people who experience stress become depressed.

== Education ==
Bagot attended the University of New South Wales in Sydney, Australia where she received a BS in psychology. After graduating, she stayed at the university and worked as a research assistant with Fred Westbook, Rick Richardson, and Gavan McNally. Here, Bagot examined the neural basis of learning in fear memories and the influence of drug self-administration and development on learning and memory. Bagot obtained her PhD in neuroscience at McGill University under Michael Meaney and Tak Pan Wong, where she investigated the epigenetic mechanisms of natural variations in maternal care on hippocampal learning, synaptic plasticity, and stress modulation. She additionally spent a year as a visiting student at the University of Amsterdam. Subsequently, she completed post doctoral research at the Icahn School of Medicine at Mount Sinai under Eric Nestler. Bagot evaluated the role of synaptic and transcriptional plasticity in the mesolimbic system in developing resilience or susceptibility to maladaptive, depressive-like behavior.

== Research ==
Bagot's uses a multidisciplinary approach to research stress and depression. In her Behavioral Neurogenomics Laboratory and as a primary investigator at the Ludmer Centre for Neuroinformatics and Mental Health, she combines molecular, cellular, and behavioral technology, including in vitro electrophysiology, in vivo optogenetics, in vivo calcium imaging, and next-generation sequencing in rodent behavioral models, to investigate the genomics and circuit changes that may drive depressive behaviors.

Much of Bagot's research focuses on using these interdisciplinary approaches to determine relative genes, transcription factors, and genes that may increase susceptibility or resilience to depression. She has identified glutamatergic ventral hippocampus (vHIP) afferents to the nucleus accumbens (NAc) as important in modulating susceptibility to chronic social defeat stress such that resilient animals have reduced vHIP activity. Using an integrative network biology approach to identify transcriptional networks involved in gene transcription and synaptic regulation, Bagot has identified networks of co-regulated genes associated with susceptibility or resilience that show opposing regulation of the ventral hippocampus and prefrontal cortex. She has also found evidence that maternal effects may modulate optimal cognitive functioning in environments varying in demand in later life.

== Awards and honors ==
Bagot's awards and honors include the Brain and Behavior Research Foundation's NARSAD Young Investigator Award (2015) and the William Dawson Scholar at McGill University. Bagot was inducted into the Society for Neuroscience in 2004, Molecular & Cellular Cognition Society in 2006, and the Canadian Association for Neuroscience in 2008. She was also a member of the International Society for Developmental Psychobiology from 2004 to 2007 and the International Society for Psychoneuroendocrinology from 2005 to 2012.

== Publications ==
- In vivo fiber photometry reveals signature of future stress susceptibility in nucleus accumbens (2018)
- Circuit-wide transcriptional profiling reveals brain region-specific gene networks regulating depression susceptibility (2016)
- Ventral hippocampal afferents to the nucleus accumbens regulate susceptibility to depression (2015)
- Maternal care and hippocampal plasticity: evidence for experience-dependent structural plasticity, altered synaptic functioning, and different responsiveness to glucocorticoids and stress (2008)

== Community engagement ==
Bagot believes in sharing and collaborating with the greater neuroscientist community. She says, “As scientists, we're enormously privileged to be doing a job that we love. But we have a responsibility to do that well and to share the insights that we gain so that we can make a bigger impact.”
