= Charles Bagot =

British politician and diplomat (1781–1843)

The Right Honourable Sir Charles Bagot GCB
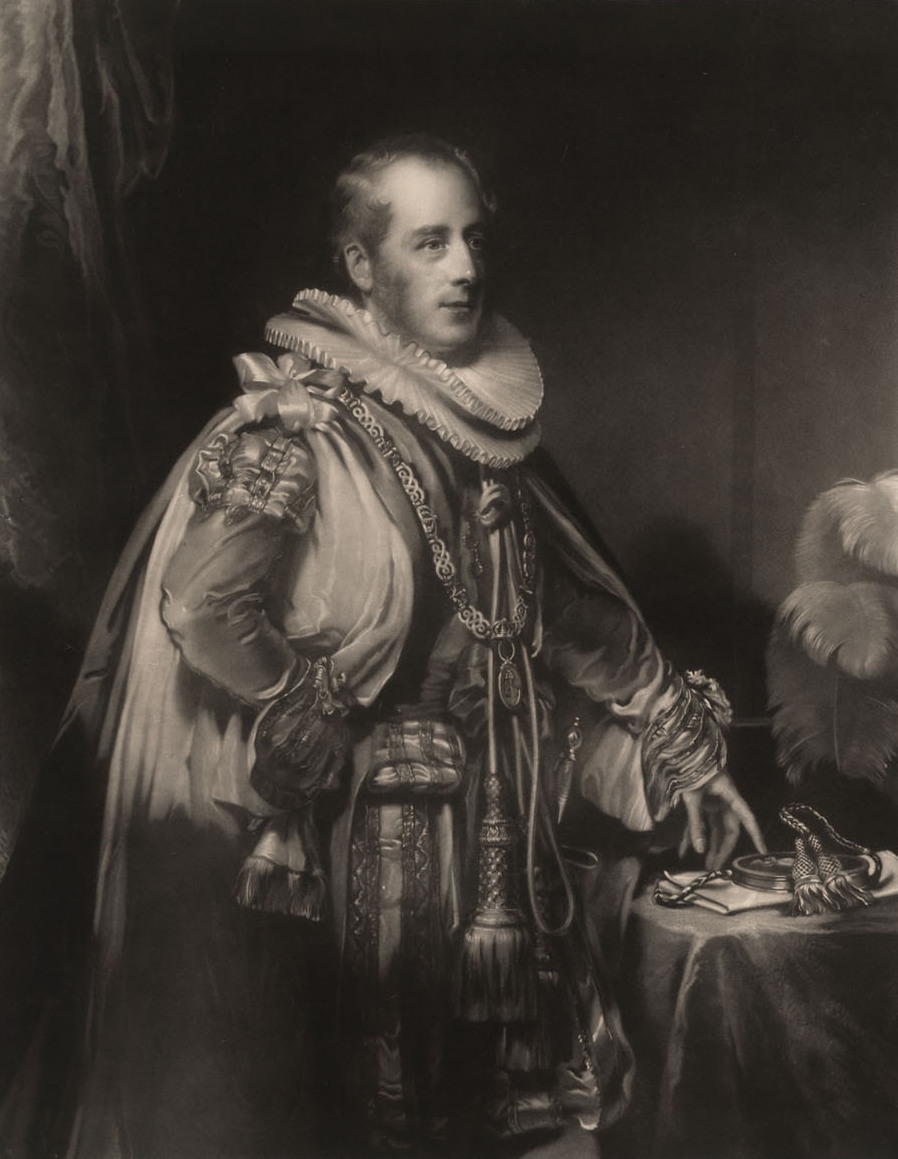

Governor General of the Province of Canada
- In office 1842–1843
- Monarch: Victoria
- Preceded by: Charles Poulett Thomson, 1st Baron Sydenham
- Succeeded by: Charles Metcalfe, 1st Baron Metcalfe

Member of Parliament for Castle Rising
- In office 1807–1808 Serving with Richard Sharp
- Preceded by: Richard Sharp; Charles Bagot Chester
- Succeeded by: Richard Sharp; Fulk Greville Howard

Personal details
- Born: 23 September 1781 Blithfield Hall, Staffordshire, England
- Died: 19 May 1843 (aged 61) Kingston, Ontario, Canada
- Spouse: Lady Mary Charlotte Anne Wellesley
- Education: Christ Church, Oxford
- Occupation: politician, administrator, diplomat

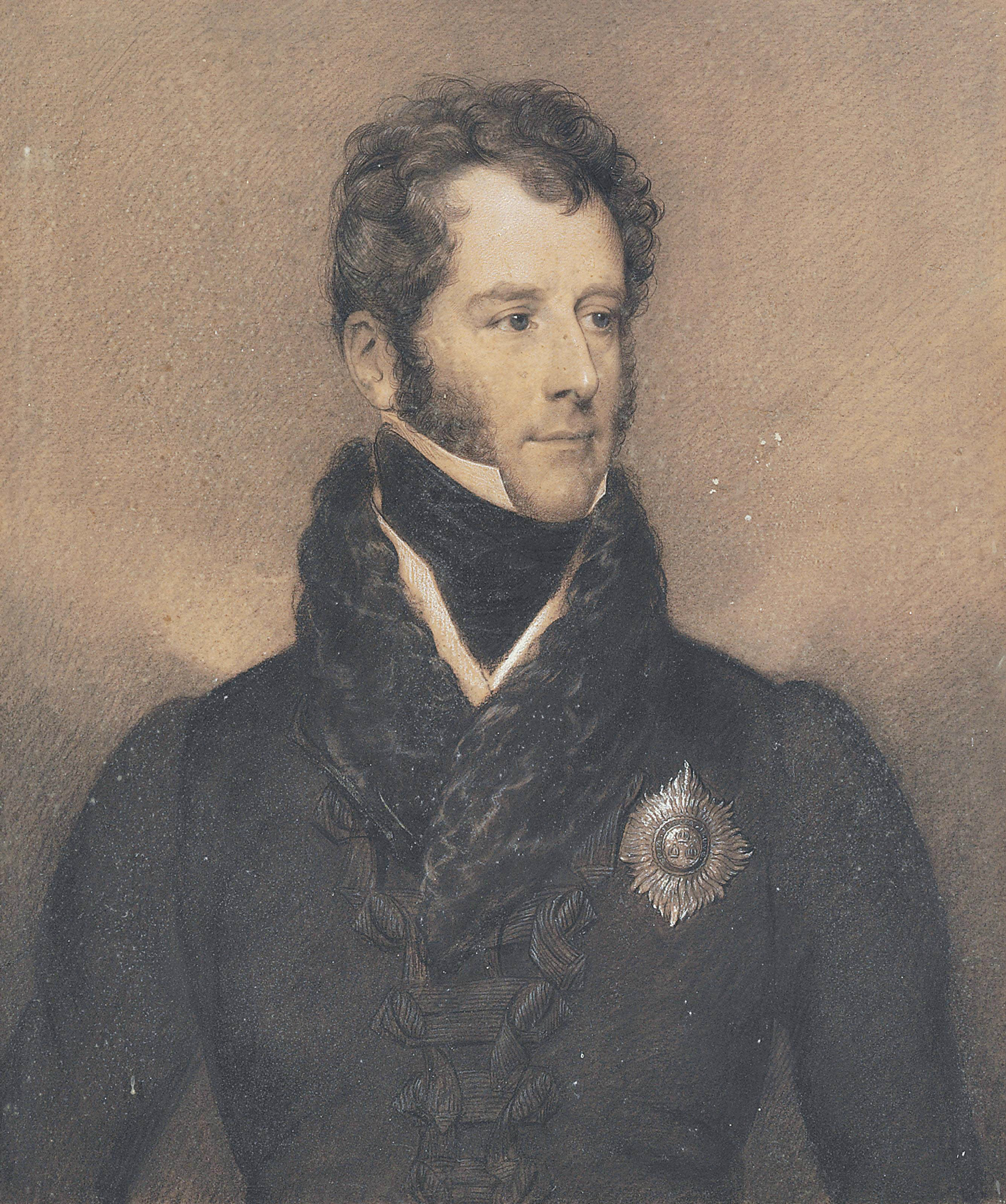
Sir Charles Bagot (Francis William Wilkin, 1825)

Sir Charles Bagot, GCB, PC (23 September 1781 – 19 May 1843) was a British diplomat and colonial administrator. He served as ambassador to the United States, Russian Empire, and the Netherlands. He served as the second Governor General of the Province of Canada from 1841 to 1843.

== Early life and family ==
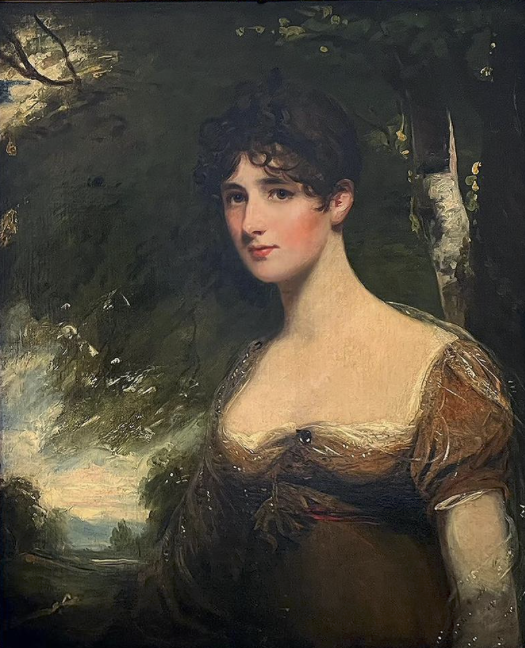
Lady Mary Charlotte Anne Wellesley-Pole "Lady Bagot" by John Hoppner, 1807

Bagot was the second surviving son of William Bagot, 1st Baron Bagot, of Blithfield Hall, Staffordshire, and the Hon. Elizabeth Louisa St. John, daughter of Viscount St. John, of Lydiard Park, Wiltshire. He was educated at Rugby School and Christ Church, Oxford. He entered Lincoln's Inn, where he studied law, but soon left determined that his calling was 'employment in the diplomatic line'. He returned to Oxford to complete his master's degree.

As a young unpaid intern at the Foreign Office, Bagot laboured to find grace with George Canning who was a rising star in the Tory party advocating abolition of slavery in the colonies.

On 22 July 1806 Bagot married Lady Mary Charlotte Anne Wellesley-Pole, the niece of Arthur Wellesley, 1st Duke of Wellington.

Her father William Wellesley-Pole worked alongside Canning at the Admiralty. When Canning was appointed Foreign Secretary in 1807, Wellesley-Pole recommended Bagot for the role of Under-Secretary, and he was duly appointed to the Foreign Office.

=== Member of Parliament ===
Bagot was elected as Member of Parliament for Castle Rising in 1807, alongside Richard Sharp. As a result of his heavy workload at the Foreign Office, Bagot resigned his seat within six months.

=== Resignation from the Foreign Office ===
Bagot's nascent civil service career was derailed after a duel between Canning and Lord Castlereagh on 21 September 1809, after which both Ministers resigned. Bagot's decision to follow Canning out of office placed him in the wilderness for 5 years, during which time both finances and marriage suffered.

== Diplomatic career ==
=== Ambassador to United States (1815–1820) ===
He was appointed minister plenipotentiary and envoy extraordinaire to the United States on 31 July 1815, in the aftermath of the War of 1812. His most significant achievement was negotiating the Rush–Bagot Treaty (1817). This is widely recognised as the first arms control treaty of the modern era, terminating the expensive arms race on the Great Lakes. Its influence was far-reaching, as it later played a part in halting the nuclear arms race during the Cold War.

He also contributed to negotiations leading to the Anglo-American Convention of 1818, which defined the border between British North America and the United States along the 49th parallel north from Lake of the Woods (see Northwest Angle) to the Pacific Ocean. Bagot ended his term in Washington, D.C. in 1820, and was succeeded by Stratford Canning.

=== Ambassador to Russia (1820–1824) ===
He subsequently served as British Ambassador to Russia, where he was Britain’s representative in Slaves Arbitration of 1821, a landmark international legal dispute between the United States and Great Britain, presided over by Tsar Alexander I of Russia. Bagot used this platform to offer legitimacy to Britain’s campaign to end the slave trade, and his arguments during the arbitration drew attention to many human rights issues.

Bagot also played a major role in negotiations leading to the 1825 Treaty of Saint Petersburg defining the border of what is modern-day Alaska.

=== Ambassador to the Netherlands (1824–1832) ===
Then, he served as British Ambassador to the Netherlands, where he used his influence with Dutch King William I to ease conflict during the Belgian Revolution (1830), and the negotiations leading to the establishment of Belgium as an independent state in 1831.

== Governor General of the Province of Canada ==
After a hiatus of ten years from diplomatic service, Bagot agreed to succeed Lord Sydenham as governor general of the newly proclaimed Province of Canada. He was chosen because of his diplomatic knowledge of the United States. Bagot was appointed 27 September 1841, and arrived in the Canadian capital Kingston on 10 January 1842, taking office two days later, on 12 January.

=== Political administration ===
Bagot was ordered by the British government to resist the strengthening demands for responsible government. As an important concession, however, Bagot persuaded the leading Canadian colonial politicians Robert Baldwin and Sir Louis-Hippolyte Lafontaine to form a ministry, on the basis of their parliamentary majority. Lafontaine, as a French-Canadian leader, had suffered abusive treatment by the British under the previous governor general, Lord Sydenham, who had died in office in 1841. This was the beginning of what became known as representative government in Canada. Bagot's leadership was an important step forward in establishing more amicable relations between the colonizing British and French.

Bagot worked productively with Baldwin and Lafontaine to establish a structure for fair municipal governance in the province of Canada. Their work has stood the test of time. With the arrival of Confederation in 1867, a well-defined system of three-tiered governance—federal, provincial, and municipal—came into being in Ontario and Quebec.

=== Extradition of fugitive slave ===
While serving as governor-general, Bagot ordered the first criminal extradition of a fugitive slave to the United States from Canada West. The fugitive in question, Nelson Hacket (or Hackett), had been valet and butler to a wealthy Arkansas slave owner. In 1841, Hacket allegedly stole a beaver overcoat and a racing mare from his master, as well as a gold watch and a saddle from two others and fled to Canada West. Hacket's master caught up with him in Chatham, Ontario, and Hacket was jailed. Governor-General Bagot ruled Hacket had committed a crime by stealing items not necessary for his escape, and for this reason he was extradited. The public in Canada West, as well as abolitionists in the U.S. and Canada, were dismayed, and their displeasure led to a formal treaty, which codified rules for extradition, but upset fugitives, abolitionists, and slave owners. As a fervent abolitionist himself, Bagot was loath to sign Nelson Hacket’s extradition order, and gave his reasons:

To refuse to surrender him would be to establish a principle that no slave escaping to this province should be given up, whatever offence, short perhaps of murder … a principle that would have been repugnant to the common sense of justice of the civilised world … and converted this province into an asylum for the worst characters.

=== Indigenous schools / Bagot Commission ===
In 1842 Bagot initiated a major review of government policies and expenditures related to Indigenous peoples in Canada East and Canada West, appointing Rawson W. Rawson, John Davidson and William Hepburn as report commissioners. Bagot's rationale for setting up the commission was

'devising a general scheme for the advancement of the physical and mental condition of this race, throughout the Province.'

He placed his “trust and confidence” in the “loyalty integrity and ability” of his commissioners to investigate thoroughly, highlight problems, and suggest solutions.

Bagot did not live to see the final report. Completed in 1844, the final report, titled the Report on the affairs of the Indians in Canada, included a call for the introduction of industrial schools to address the noted failure of day schools to effectively keep Indigenous children from the influence of their parents and is regarded as a foundational document in the rationale for establishing the Canadian Indian residential school system.

=== University administrator ===
Bagot promoted education and played a key role in developing McGill University, Montreal and Upper Canada College, Toronto. He also established King’s College (now the University of Toronto), laying the foundation stone on 23 April 1842, and serving as Chancellor until his death.

== Death ==
Having resigned his governor general's office in January 1843, Bagot died four months later at the vice-regal residence, Alwington House, Alwington, Kingston, too ill to return to the United Kingdom. Bagot's library was sold at auction by Messrs Evans in London on 20 June 1844 (and two following days); a copy of the catalogue (which contained Audubon's Birds of America) is at Cambridge University Library (shelfmark Munby.c.149(10)).

=== Legacy ===
He is chiefly remembered for the Bagot Commission (1842–1844) which recommended developing the Residential school system, his contributions to the development of the "undefended border" between the United States and Canada, and for fostering more cooperative and positive political relations between the two main colonial groups of British and French settlers. He was also responsible for settling the borders of modern-day Alaska.

Despite personally intervening to rescue hundreds of black slaves incarcerated by the United States after the War of 1812, and his passionate anti-slavery advocacy during the Slaves Arbitration negotiations (1821), Bagot is mainly recalled for his involvement in the Nelson Hackett case - which has portrayed him contrary to his actions, beliefs and deeds whilst serving as a diplomat.

Bagot Street, a main thoroughfare in downtown Kingston, Ontario, is named in his memory.

Mount Bagot, a mountain on the Canada-US border, is named in his honor.

== Family ==
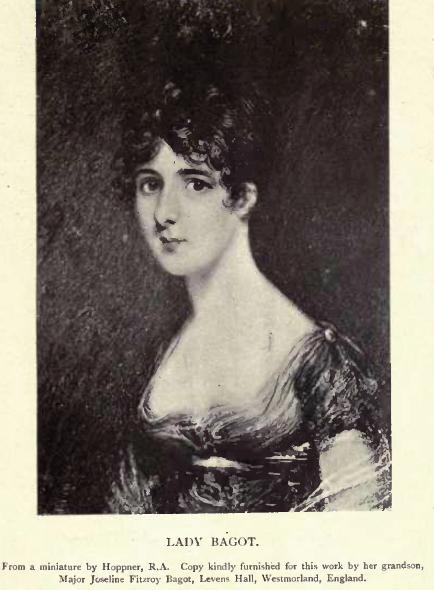
Lady Mary Charlotte Ann Bagot from a miniature by Hoppner, R.A.

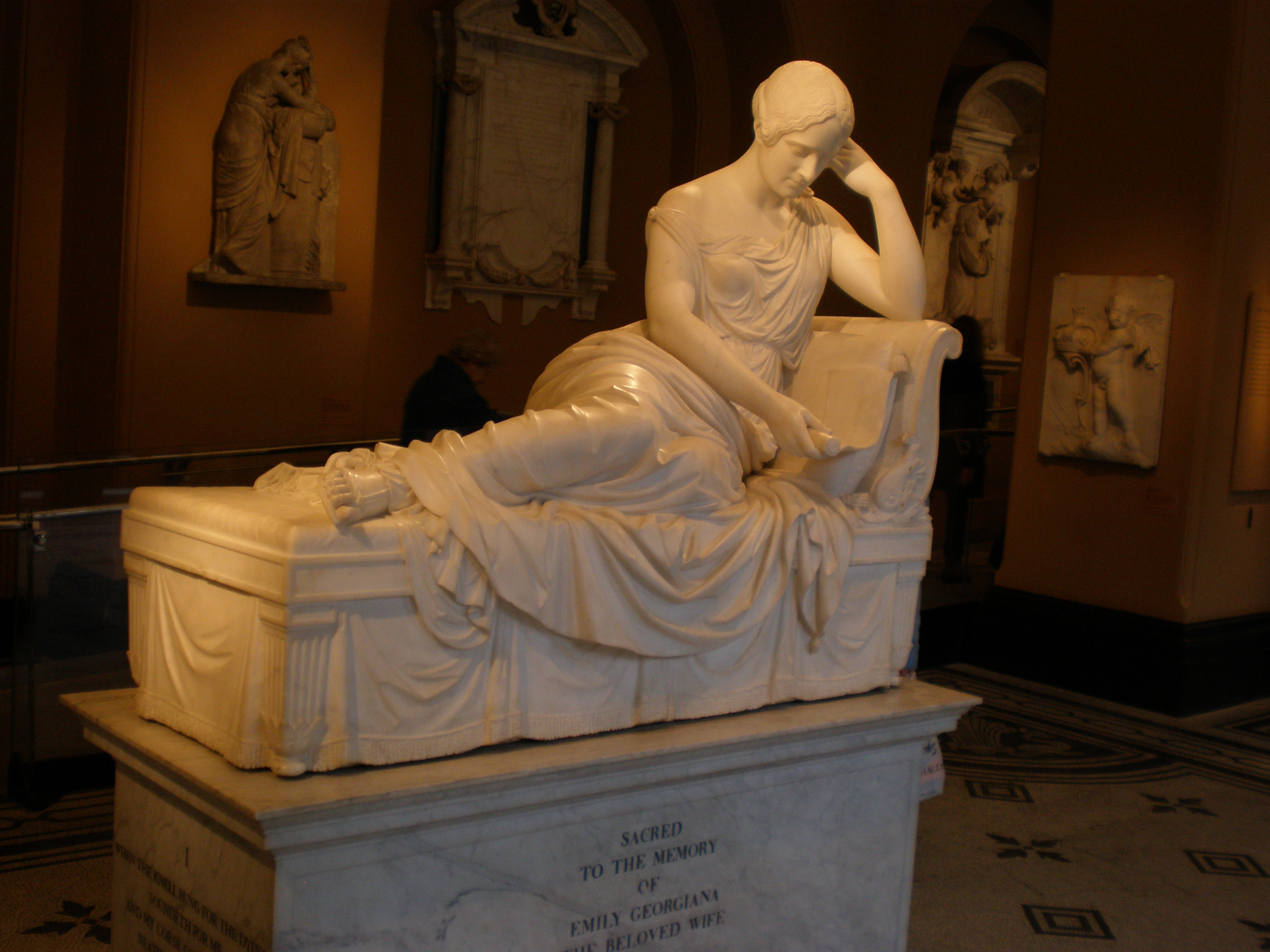
Monument of his daughter Emily Georgiana, Countess of Winchilsea, wife of 10th Earl of Winchilsea.

Bagot married Lady Mary Charlotte Anne Wellesley, daughter of William Wellesley-Pole, 3rd Earl of Mornington on 22 July 1806. Together they had:

- Luisa Bagot (1807–1824), died young of typhus
- Colonel Charles Bagot (1808–1881), m. Sophia Percy, granddaughter of Algernon Percy, 1st Earl of Beverley
- Emily Georgiana Bagot (1809–1848), m. George Finch-Hatton, 10th Earl of Winchilsea
- Arthur Bagot (1811–1825)
- Caroline Bagot (1812–1887), m. Dr John David
- Henrietta Maria Bagot (1815–1844), m. Henry Paget, 2nd Marquess of Anglesey
- Georgiana Augusta Bagot (1818–1851)
- George Talbot Bagot (1820–1907), m. Charlotte Blair, daughter of W T Blair, Mayor of Bath
- Colonel Alexander Bagot (1822–1874), m. Gertrude Letitia Hallifax
- Wilhelmina Frederica Bagot (1826–1852), m. Henry Bagot, son of her uncle, Richard Bagot

Caroline, Georgiana, and Wilhelmina accompanied their parents to Canada, on Bagot's appointment as Governor-General of British North America on 12 January 1842. After her husband's death at Kingston, on 18 May 1843, she accompanied his remains to England. She died in London on 2 February 1845.

== Sources ==
- Bagot, William (1824). Memorials Of The Bagot Family. W. Hodgetts.
- Browning, Thomas Blair (1901). "Bagot, Charles" . In Lee, Sidney (ed.). Dictionary of National Biography (1st supplement). Vol. 1. London: Smith, Elder & Co.
- Milloy, John S. (1999). A National Crime: The Canadian Government and the Residential School System 1879–1986. University of Manitoba Press. ISBN 978-0-88755-646-3.
- Morgan, Henry James, ed. (1903). Types of Canadian Women and of Women who are or have been Connected with Canada. Toronto: Williams Briggs. p. 19.
- Mosley, Charles, ed. (1999). Burke's Peerage and Baronetage, 106th edition, 2 volumes. Burke's Peerage (Genealogical Books) Ltd.
- Mosley, Charles, ed. (2003). Burke's Peerage, Baronetage & Knightage, 107th edition, 3 volumes. Burke's Peerage (Genealogical Books) Ltd.
- Winks, Robin W. (1997). The Blacks in Canada: A History (second ed.). McGill-Queen's University Press. ISBN 978-0-77351-632-8.
- Lodge, Edmund (1859). Lodge's Peerage and Baronetage (knightage & Companionage) of the British Empire. Hurst & Blackett Lodge.
- Monet, Jacques, S.J. (4 March 2015) [14 January 2008]. "Sir Charles Bagot". The Canadian Encyclopedia (online ed.). Historica Canada.
- Roberts, Geraldine. (4 June 2026) The Rebel and the Peacemaker, August Books ISBN 978-1-83598-406-2

Parliament of the United Kingdom
Preceded by Richard Sharp; Charles Bagot Chester	Member of Parliament for Castle Rising; 1807–1808; With: Richard Sharp	Succeeded by Richard Sharp; Fulk Greville Howard
Political offices
Preceded by The Lord Sydenham	Governor General of the Province of Canada; 1842–1843	Succeeded by The Lord Metcalfe
Academic offices
Preceded by The Lord Sydenham	Chancellor of King's College; 1842–1843	Succeeded by The Lord Metcalfe
Diplomatic posts
Preceded by No representation due to the War of 1812	Envoy Extraordinary and Minister Plenipotentiary to the United States; 1815–1820	Succeeded by Stratford Canning
