= John Bagot (cricketer) =

British Guianese cricketer

Personal information
- Born: 21 March 1842; Georgetown, British Guiana
- Died: 18 June 1901 (aged 59); British Guiana
- Batting: Right-handed

Domestic team information
- Years: Team
- 1865: Demerara (British Guiana)

Career statistics
Competition	FC
Matches	1
Runs scored	6
Batting average	3.00
100s/50s	0/0
Top score	3
Catches/stumpings	0/–
- Source: CricketArchive, 23 December 2014

John Bagot (21 March 1842 – 18 June 1901) was a British Guianese cricketer who played a single first-class match for Demerara, an antecedent of the present Guyanese national side.

Bagot was born in Georgetown, the capital of the colony of British Guiana (and later of independent Guyana), in March 1842. A right-handed batsman, his sole match at first-class level came in what was retrospectively considered the inaugural first-class match in the West Indies, played against Barbados at the Garrison Savannah, Bridgetown, in February 1865. In the match, Bagot scored three runs in each innings, coming in last in the batting order. He was dismissed by Augustus Smith in the first innings and his brother, Frederick Smith. Bagot did not participate in the return Barbados–Demerara fixture, played in Georgetown in September 1865, and died in the colony in June 1901.

Three other Bagots played first-class cricket for Demerara in the 19th century – William (1845–1918), Edward (1856–1903), and Cecil (1858–1921), all born in Georgetown. It is unclear if or how the four Bagots were related.
