= Stawell =

Stawell may refer to:

== People ==
- John Stawell (1600–1662), English MP
- Baron Stawell, a historical English barony (1683–1755 and 1760–1820)
  - Ralph Stawell, 1st Baron Stawell (c. 1640–1689), son of John
  - Mary Bilson-Legge, 1st Baroness Stawell (1725/26–1780)
  - Henry Bilson-Legge, 2nd Baron Stawell (1757–1820)
- William Stawell (1815–1889) Australian colonial statesman

== Places ==
- Stawell, Victoria, Australia, named after William
  - Stawell Underground Physics Laboratory, located in the Stawell gold mine
- Stawell, Somerset, England

== Other uses ==
- HMAS Stawell, a Bathurst class corvette named after the Australian settlement
- Stawell School, once a private school for girls on Mount Lofty, South Australia
