= Richard Bagot (bishop) =

Bishop of Bath and Wells from 1845 to 1854

The Right Reverend The Honourable Richard Bagot
- Bishop of Bath and Wells
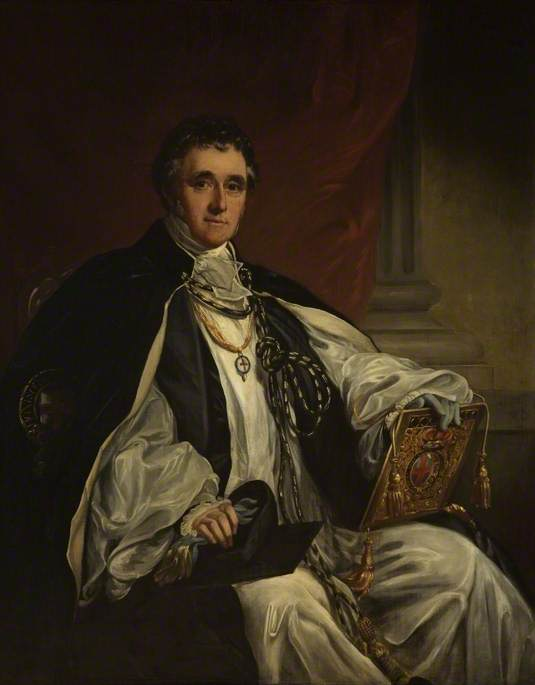
- Portrait of Bagot, after Francis Grant, 1846
- Diocese: Bath and Wells
- Installed: 1845
- Term ended: 1854
- Predecessor: George Henry Law
- Successor: The Lord Auckland
- Other posts: Bishop of Oxford (1829–1845); Dean of Canterbury (1827–1845)

Personal details
- Born: 22 November 1782 Staffordshire
- Died: 15 May 1854 (aged 71) Staffordshire
- Denomination: Anglican
- Education: Rugby School
- Alma mater: Christ Church, Oxford
- Spouse: Lady Harriet Villiers (m. 1806; died 1854)
- Children: 12
- Parents: William Bagot (father); Elizabeth Louisa St John (mother)

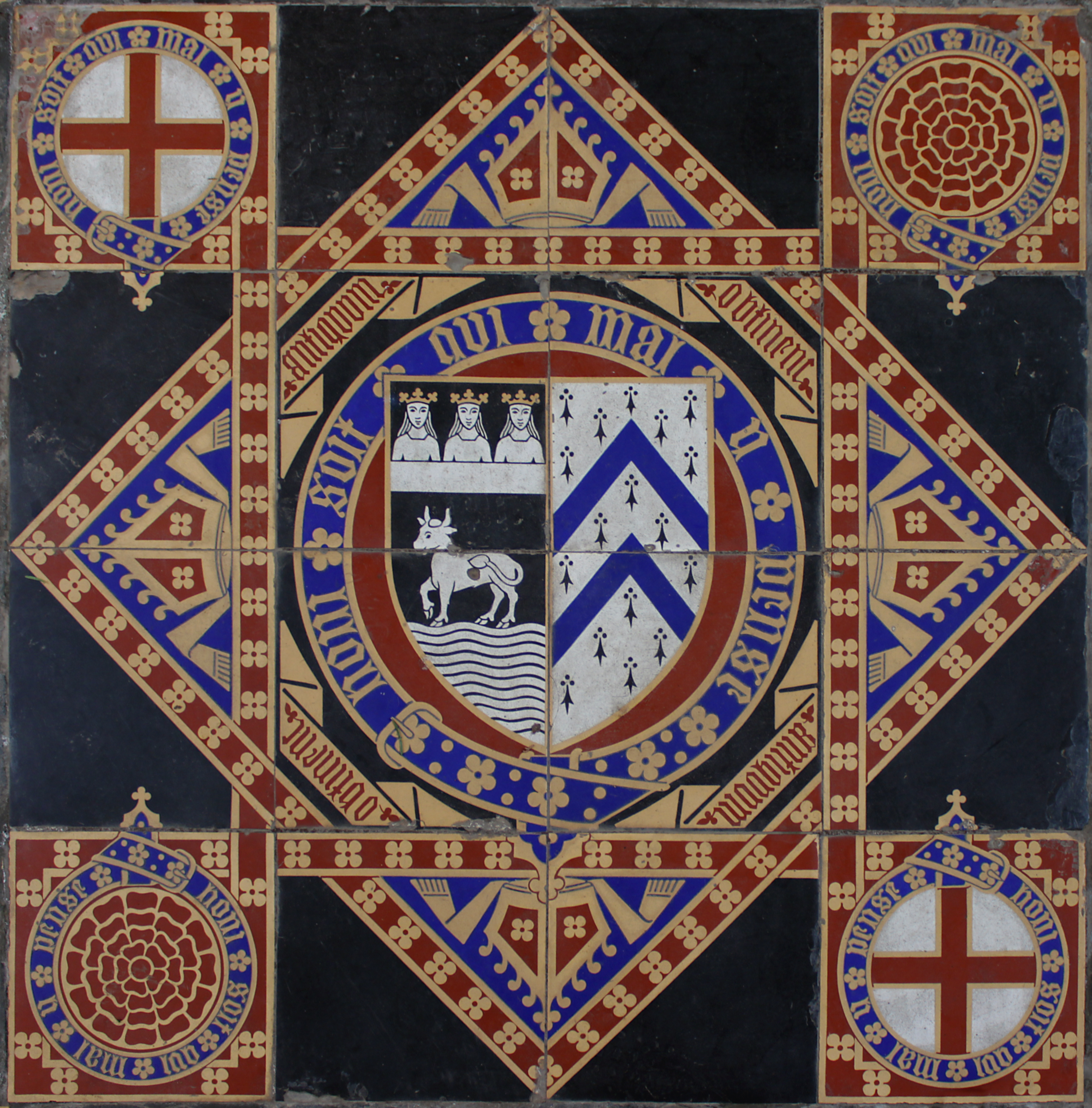
Arms of Richard Bagot, Bishop of Oxford and Chancellor of the Order of the Garter: Arms of See of Oxford impaling Ermine, two chevrons azure (Bagot) circumscribed by the Garter. Tiles created by A.W.N Pugin

The Honourable Richard Bagot (22 November 1782 – 15 May 1854) was an English bishop.

== Early life ==
Bagot was born on 22 November 1782 at Staffordshire. He was a younger son of William Bagot, 1st Baron Bagot, of Blithfield Hall, by the Hon. Elizabeth Louisa St John. Among his siblings were William Bagot, 2nd Baron Bagot, and Sir Charles Bagot.

His father was the eldest son of Sir Walter Bagot, 5th Baronet, and Lady Barbara Legge (a daughter of the 1st Earl of Dartmouth). His paternal uncle was Bishop Lewis Bagot. His maternal grandparents were John St John, 2nd Viscount St John and Anne Furness (a daughter of Sir Robert Furnese, 2nd Baronet, and sister of Frederick St John, 2nd Viscount Bolingbroke and Gen. Henry St John).

Bagot was educated at Rugby School and Christ Church, Oxford (matriculated 1799, B.A. 1803, M.A. 1806, D.D. by diploma 1829).

== Career ==
In 1804, Bagot was elected to a fellowship at All Souls College, Oxford, which he resigned two years later upon his marriage.

He served as Rector of Leigh and Blithfield and Prebendary of Lichfield Cathedral. He was Canon of Windsor from 1822 to 1827, Dean of Canterbury from 1827 to 1845, Bishop of Oxford from 1829 to 1845 and Bishop of Bath and Wells from 1845 to 1854. He was the first Bishop of Oxford to be ex officio Chancellor of the Order of the Garter (from 1837 to 1845).

Holding the see of Oxford through the early years of the Tractarian movement, the Tory Bagot, hostile to Low Church attitudes, was initially and notably sympathetic to John Henry Newman and his associates. That did change by the first years of the 1840s, and Bagot did act in particular against the preaching of Edward Pusey.

== Personal life ==
In 1806, Bagot married Lady Harriet Villiers (1788–1870), daughter of George Villiers, 4th Earl of Jersey. Together, they had eight sons, three of whom became clergy and three joined the armed services, and four daughters:

- Edward Richard Bagot (1808–1874), a Maj.-Gen. who married Matilda Perkins, daughter of Henry Perkins, in 1842.
- Villiers Bagot (1809–1810), who died young.
- Henry Bagot (1810–1877), a Vice-Admiral in the Royal Navy; he married his first cousin Wilhelmina Frederica Bagot, daughter of Sir Charles Bagot and Lady Mary Wellesley-Pole (a daughter of the 3rd Earl of Mornington), in 1846. After her death, he married Eleanor Chandos-Pole, daughter of Edward Sacheverell Chandos-Pole and Anna Maria Wilmot, in 1858.
- Charles Walter Bagot (1812–1886), a cleric; he married Mary Chester, daughter of Lt.-Gen. John Chester and Sophia Elizabeth Stuart, in 1846.
- Lewis Francis Bagot (1813–1870), a cleric; he married Hon. Catherine Boscawen, a daughter of Rev. Hon. John Evelyn Boscawen (a son of the 3rd Viscount Falmouth) and Catherine Elizabeth Annesley, in 1848.
- Harriet Frances Bagot (1816–1881), who married Rev. Lord Charles Thynne, a son of Thomas Thynne, 2nd Marquess of Bath and Hon. Isabella Elizabeth Byng (a daughter of the 4th Viscount Torrington), in 1837.
- George Bagot (1818–1867), a Maj. in the British Army; he married Hon. Mary Eleanor Frances Browne, daughter of John Browne, 3rd Baron Kilmaine and Mary Law (a granddaughter of the 1st Baron Ellenborough), in 1861.
- Frances Caroline Bagot (1819–1840), who died at age 21.
- Richard Bagot (1821–1840), who died at age 19.
- Frederick Bagot (1822–1892), a cleric; he married Charlotte Anne Philippine Pearse, daughter of Brice Pearse, in 1862.
- Emily Mary Bagot (1823–1853), who married Hon. George Thomas Orlando Bridgeman, second son of George Bridgeman, 2nd Earl of Bradford, in 1850.
- Mary Isabel Bagot (1825–1900), who married William Dawnay, 7th Viscount Downe in 1843.

Bagot died at Staffordshire on 15 May 1854.

Church of England titles
| Preceded by Hugh Percy | Dean of Canterbury; 1827–1845 | Succeeded by William Rowe Lyall |
| Preceded by Charles Lloyd | Bishop of Oxford; 1829–1845 | Succeeded by Samuel Wilberforce |
| Preceded by George Henry Law | Bishop of Bath and Wells; 1845–1854 | Succeeded by The Lord Auckland |
