= Walter Bagot =

Walter Bagot may refer to:

- Sir Walter Bagot (died 1622) (1557–1622/23), Member of Parliament for Tamworth
- Sir Walter Bagot, 3rd Baronet (1644–1704), English barrister and landowner
- Sir Walter Bagot, 5th Baronet (1702–1768), English Member of Parliament
- Walter Bagot (priest) (1731–1806), English cleric and landowner
- Walter Bagot (architect) (1880–1963), South Australian architect

== See also ==
- Baron Bagot
