= Joseph Phillimore =

English lawyer and politician (1775–1855)

Joseph Phillimore (1775–1855) was an English civil lawyer and politician, Regius Professor of Civil Law at Oxford from 1809.

== Life ==
The eldest son of Joseph Phillimore, vicar of Orton on the Hill, Leicestershire, by Mary, daughter of John Machin of Kensington, was born on 14 September 1775. He was educated at Westminster School and Christ Church, Oxford, where he matriculated on 30 May 1793, graduated B.A. in 1797, B.C.L. in 1800, and proceeded D.C.L. in 1804.

Admitted a member of the College of Advocates on 21 November 1804, he practised with success in the ecclesiastical and Admiralty courts, and in 1806–7 was commissioner for the disposal of Prussian and Danish ships seized by way of reprisals for the violation of the neutrality of Hanover by the Prussian government, and the submission of Denmark to France. In 1809 he succeeded French Laurence as regius professor of civil law at Oxford, chancellor of the diocese of Oxford, and judge of the court of admiralty of the Cinque ports. On 17 March 1817 he was returned to parliament in the Grenville interest for the borough of St Mawes, Cornwall, vacant by the death of his friend Francis Horner; he continued to represent it until the dissolution of 2 June 1826. He was then (9 June) returned for Yarmouth, Isle of Wight, but did not seek re-election on the dissolution of 24 July 1830.

Phillimore was one of the original members of a short-lived third party formed in 1818. During his brief parliamentary career he distinguished himself by his advocacy of Catholic emancipation and his expositions of international law. He was placed on the board of control for India upon its reconstitution on 8 February 1822, and held office until the fall of Lord Goderich's administration in January 1828. On 23 January 1833 he was named principal commissioner for the final adjudication of the French claims under the treaties of 1815 and 1818. He also presided over the registration commission appointed on 13 September 1836, and drafted the report. Phillimore was appointed king's advocate in the court of admiralty on 25 October 1834, and chancellor of the diocese of Worcester and commissary of the deanery of St Paul's Cathedral in the same year; chancellor of the diocese of Bristol in 1842, and judge of the consistory court of Gloucester in 1846.

He received the honorary degree of LL.D. from the university of Cambridge in 1834, was elected Fellow of the Royal Society on 13 February 1840, and a trustee of the Busby charity on 23 May the same year. He retained the chair of civil law at Oxford until his death, which took place at his residence, Shiplake House, near Reading, on 24 January 1855.

== Works ==
Phillimore gained in 1798 the university English essay prize by a dissertation on 'Chivalry,' printed in the 'Oxford English Prize Essays,' Oxford, 1836, vol. ii. As a young man he had a passing connection with the Edinburgh Review.

Phillimore edited 'Reports of Cases argued and determined in the Ecclesiastical Courts at Doctors' Commons and in the High Court of Delegates (1809–21),' London, 1818–27, 3 vols. 8vo; and 'Reports of Cases argued and determined in the Arches and Prerogative Courts of Canterbury,' containing the judgments of Sir George Lee, London, 1832–3, 3 vols. His 'Speeches delivered in the Sheldon Theatre, at the Commemoration holden on the 10th, 11th, and 13 June 1834, at which the Duke of Wellington presided in Person,' were printed at Oxford the same year.

== Family ==
Phillimore married, on 19 March 1807, Elizabeth (d. 1859), daughter of the Rev. Walter Bagot, rector of Blithfield, Staffordshire, younger brother of William Bagot, 1st Baron Bagot, by whom he had, with other issue, John George Phillimore, Greville Phillimore, Augustus Phillimore, Robert Joseph Phillimore, and Richard Phillimore.

Richard Phillimore, then a student at Christ Church, drowned in June 1843 while swimming in the river Thames at Sandford Lock – a notoriously dangerous spot. His friend William Gaisford, the son of Thomas Gaisford got into difficulties while swimming and Phillimore entered the water to save him, but both young men perished. They are buried in Christ Church Cathedral. They are commemorated by an obelisk at Sandford Lock and two memorial tablets in the north walk of the Cathedral cloisters.

Parliament of the United Kingdom
| Preceded by Francis Horner; Scrope Bernard-Morland | Member of Parliament for St Mawes; 1817–1826; With: Scrope Bernard-Morland | Succeeded by Scrope Bernard-Morland; Sir Codrington Carrington |
| Preceded by Theodore Broadhead; Sir Peter Pole, Bt | Member of Parliament for Yarmouth; 1826–1830; With: Lord Binning to 1827; Thomas Wallace 1827–30 | Succeeded by William Yates Peel; George Lowther Thompson |
