= Lewis Bagot =

English bishop (1740–1802)

The Right Reverend Lewis Bagot
- Bishop of St Asaph
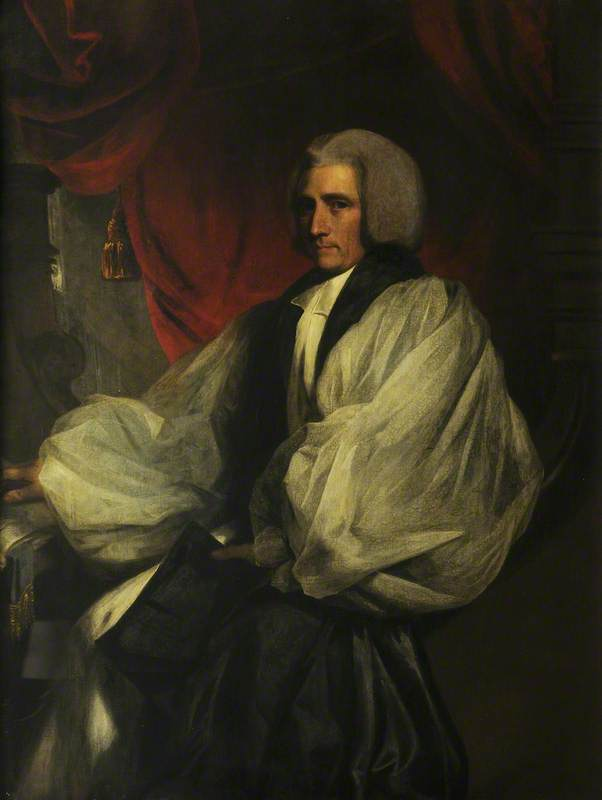
- Lewis Bagot by John Hoppner
- Diocese: Diocese of St Asaph
- In office: 1790–1802
- Predecessor: Samuel Hallifax
- Successor: Samuel Horsley
- Other posts: Bishop of Bristol (1782–1783); Bishop of Norwich (1783–1790)

Personal details
- Born: 1 January 1740
- Died: 4 July 1802 (aged 62)
- Denomination: Anglican
- Education: Westminster School; Christ Church, Oxford

Lewis Bagot (1 January 1740 – 4 June 1802) was an English cleric who served as the Bishop of Bristol, Norwich, and St Asaph.

== Early life ==
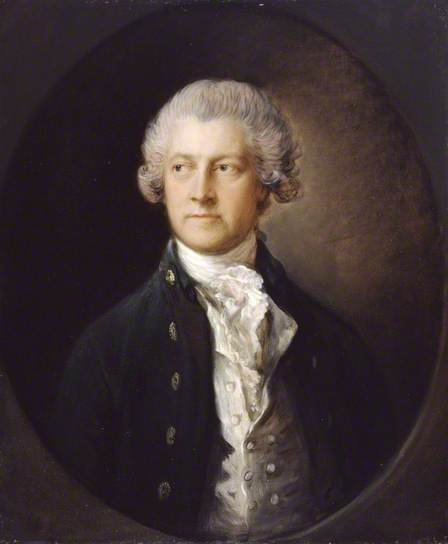
Lewis Bagot, Bishop of Bristol, by Thomas Gainsborough.

He was the fifth son of Sir Walter Wagstaffe Bagot of Blithfield Hall, Staffordshire and the former Lady Barbara Legg (a daughter of William Legge, 1st Earl of Dartmouth). Among his elder brothers were William, Lord Bagot, the Rev. Walter Bagot of Pype Hayes Hall (who married Anne Swinnerton and, later, Mary Ward), and Richard Bagot (who married a daughter of Viscount Andover).

== Career ==
He was educated at Westminster School and at Christ Church, Oxford.

He was ordained in 1765 and was Canon of Christ Church 1771–1777 and Dean of Christ Church 1777–1783. He was appointed Bishop of Bristol in 1782, Bishop of Norwich in 1783 and Bishop of St Asaph 1790.

His portrait appears in the National Portrait Gallery.

== See also ==
- William Bagot, 1st Baron Bagot

Academic offices
Preceded by William Markham	Dean of Christ Church, Oxford; 1777–1783	Succeeded by Cyril Jackson
Church of England titles
Preceded by Thomas Newton	Bishop of Bristol; 1782–1783	Succeeded by Christopher Wilson
Preceded by Philip Yonge	Bishop of Norwich; 1783–1790	Succeeded by George Horne
Preceded by Samuel Hallifax	Bishop of St Asaph; 1790–1802	Succeeded by Samuel Horsley
