= Bridges v Hawkesworth =

Bridges v Hawkesworth, 21 L.J.Q.B. 75 [1851], was an 1851 English legal case decided in the Queen's Bench Division of the High Court.

== Facts ==
In October 1847, Bridges found bank notes on the floor of a shop. Hawkesworth, a partner in the firm owning the shop, was summoned, and Bridges gave him the notes, for Hawkesworth to give to the rightful owner.

The rightful owner did not return to claim their property, so Hawkesworth advertised the bank notes in The Times newspaper, offering to return the money (less his costs) to anyone who could describe the package in which the notes had been found, and pay an indemnity. The advertisement went unanswered. Three years elapsed, and then Bridges asked Hawkesworth for the money. Hawkesworth declined and Bridges sued. The lower court ruled for Hawkesworth.

== Judgment ==
The lower court's judgment was reversed, and Patteson J found that Bridges' claim to the bank notes outweighed Hawkesworth's.
