= Vaughan Williams J =

Vaughan Williams J may refer to either of two British judges:

- Sir Edward Vaughan Williams (1797–1875)
- His son, Sir Roland Vaughan Williams (1838–1916)
