= William Bagot, 1st Baron Bagot =

18th-century British politician (1728–1798)

The Right Honourable The Lord Bagot
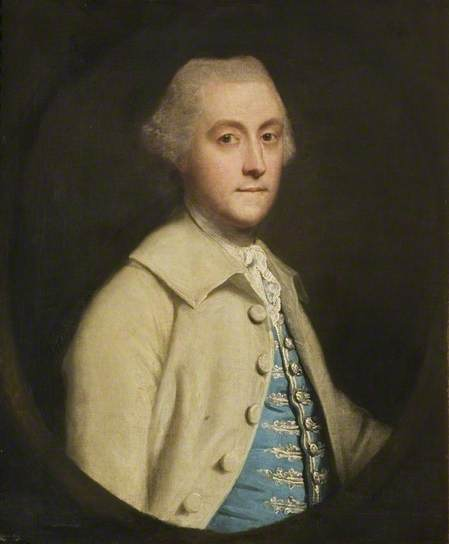
- Portrait of Lord Bagot by Sir Joshua Reynolds

Member of Parliament for Staffordshire
- In office 1754–1780 Serving with William Leveson-Gower, Henry Thynne, Lord Grey of Groby, Sir John Wrottesley
- Preceded by: William Leveson-Gower; Sir Walter Wagstaffe Bagot
- Succeeded by: Sir John Wrottesley; Viscount Lewisham

Personal details
- Born: William Bagot; 28 February 1728
- Died: 22 October 1798 (aged 70) London, England
- Party: Tory
- Relations: Walter Bagot (brother); Lewis Bagot (brother); William Legge, 1st Earl of Dartmouth (grandfather); Sir Edward Bagot, 4th Baronet (grandfather)
- Children: 9, including William, Charles, Richard
- Parent(s): Sir Walter Bagot, 5th Baronet; Lady Barbara Legge
- Education: Magdalen College, Oxford

William Bagot, 1st Baron Bagot (28 February 1728 – 22 October 1798), known as Sir William Bagot, 6th Baronet, from 1768 to 1780, was a British politician who sat in the House of Commons from 1754 to 1780. He was then raised to the peerage as Baron Bagot.

== Early life ==
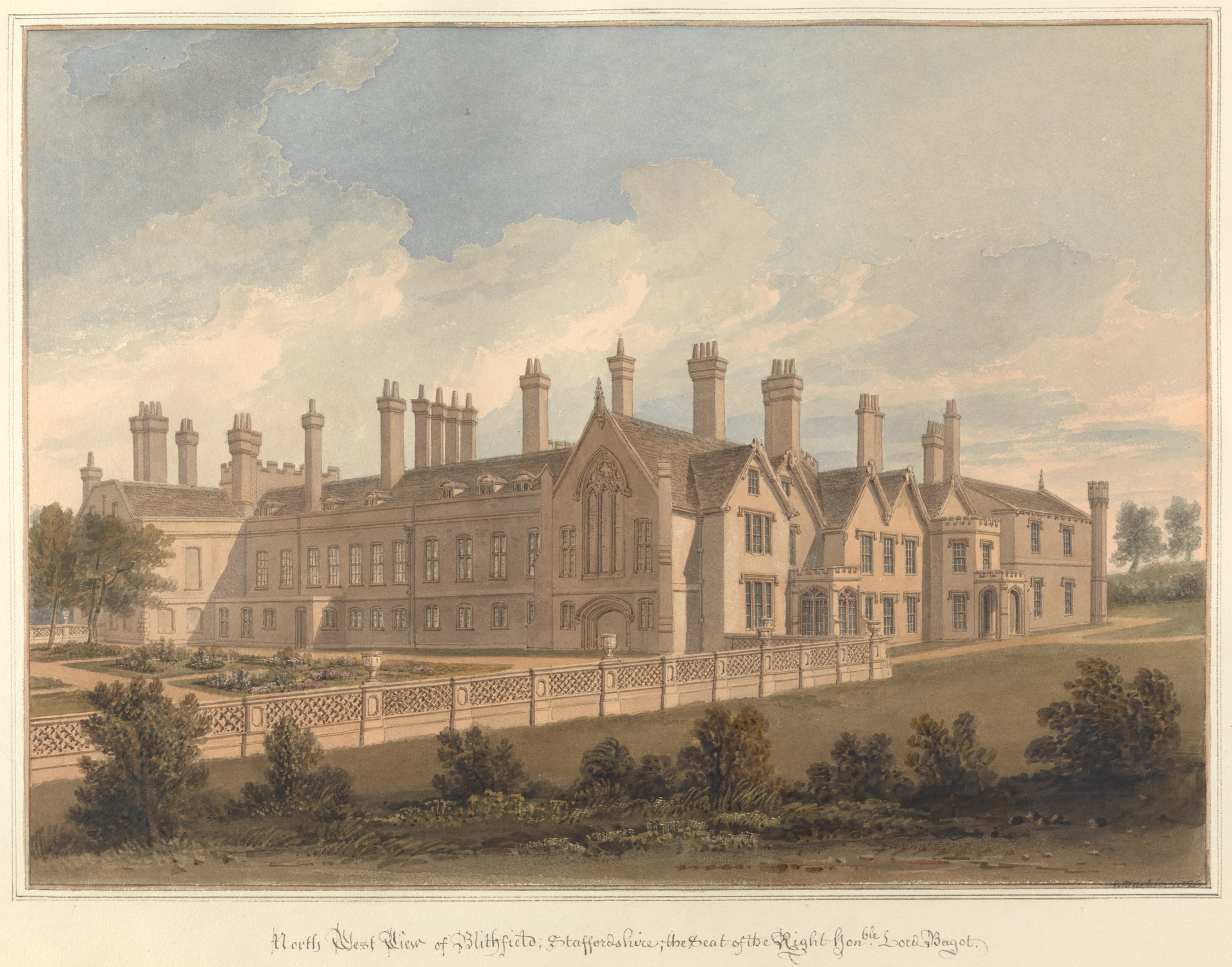
Blithfield Hall, c.1850

Bagot was born on 28 February 1728. He was the eldest son of Sir Walter Bagot, 5th Baronet, and his wife Lady Barbara Legge. Among his siblings were Charles Bagot (who married Catherine Legge), the Rev. Walter Bagot of Pype Hayes Hall (who married Anne Swinnerton and, later, Mary Ward), Richard Bagot (who married a daughter of Viscount Andover) and the Right Reverend Lewis Bagot, Bishop of St Asaph.

His paternal grandparents were Sir Edward Bagot, 4th Baronet and the former Frances Wagstaffe (daughter of Sir Thomas Wagstaffe of Tachbrook). His maternal grandparents were William Legge, 1st Earl of Dartmouth. His niece, Jane Margaret (daughter of his brother Walter by his second wife, Mary Ward) married the English judge Sir Edward Vaughan Williams in 1826 and they were the grandparents of the composer Ralph Vaughan Williams.

He was educated at Magdalen College, Oxford, and graduated Master of Arts in 1749 and Doctor of Civil Law in 1754.

== Career ==
Bagot then sat as a Tory Member of Parliament for Staffordshire from 1754 to 1780. In 1768, Bagot succeeded to the Baronetcy of Blithfield, Staffordshire, and to the family estate at Blithfield Hall on the death of his father.

On 17 October 1780 he was raised to the Peerage of Great Britain as Baron Bagot, of Bagot's Bromley in the County of Stafford.

== Personal life ==
On 20 August 1760, Bagot was married to Elizabeth St John (c. 1744–1820) in Wroxham. She was the eldest daughter of John St John, 2nd Viscount St John and the former Anne Furness (only child by his first wife of Sir Robert Furnese, 2nd Baronet) and sister of Frederick St John, 2nd Viscount Bolingbroke and Gen. Henry St John. Together, William and Elizabeth had nine children, including:

- Edward Bagot (1763–1773), who died of scarlet fever.
- Walter Bagot (1766–1773), who also died of scarlet fever.
- Barbara Bagot (1768–1773), who also died of scarlet fever.
- William Bagot, 2nd Baron Bagot (1773–1856), who married Hon. Emily FitzRoy, fourth daughter of Charles FitzRoy, 1st Baron Southampton, in 1799. After her death he married, in 1807, Lady Louisa Legge, eldest daughter of his cousin George Legge, 3rd Earl of Dartmouth and his wife Lady Frances Finch (second daughter of Heneage Finch, 3rd Earl of Aylesford).
- Hon. Sir Charles Bagot (1781–1843), who married Lady Mary Wellesley-Pole, eldest daughter of William Wellesley-Pole, 3rd Earl of Mornington and Katherine Forbes (eldest daughter of Adm. Hon. John Forbes, a son of George Forbes, 3rd Earl of Granard, and Lady Mary Capell, a daughter of William Capell, 3rd Earl of Essex).
- Hon. Richard Bagot (1782–1854), the Dean of Canterbury and Bishop of Bath and Wells and Oxford who married Lady Harriet Villiers, the eighth daughter of George Villiers, 4th Earl of Jersey.
- Hon. Louisa Bagot (d. 1834), who married her cousin Walter Sneyd (d. 1829) in 1786.
- Hon. Henrietta Bagot (d. c. 1807)
- Hon. Frances Bagot (d. 1806), who married, as his first wife, Gen. Hon. Sir Edward Paget, the fourth son of Henry Paget, 1st Earl of Uxbridge.

He died in London on 22 October 1798, aged 70, and was succeeded by his eldest son William. Lady Bagot died in 1820.

Parliament of Great Britain
Preceded by William Leveson-Gower; Sir Walter Wagstaffe Bagot	Member of Parliament for Staffordshire; 1754–1780; Served alongside: William Leveson-Gower 1754–1757; Henry Thynne 1757–1761; Lord Grey of Groby 1761–1768; Sir John Wrottesley 1768–1780	Succeeded by Sir John Wrottesley; Viscount Lewisham
Peerage of Great Britain
New creation	Baron Bagot; 1780–1798	Succeeded by William Bagot
Baronetage of England
Preceded by Walter Wagstaffe Bagot	Baronet (of Blithfield); 1768–1798	Succeeded by William Bagot
