= François Chéron =

François Chéron may refer to:

- François Chéron (medalist) (1635–1698), French goldsmith, medallist, and painter
- François Chéron (writer) (1764–1829), French writer and senior official
