= Henry Vernon (1686–1719) =

English landowner and politician

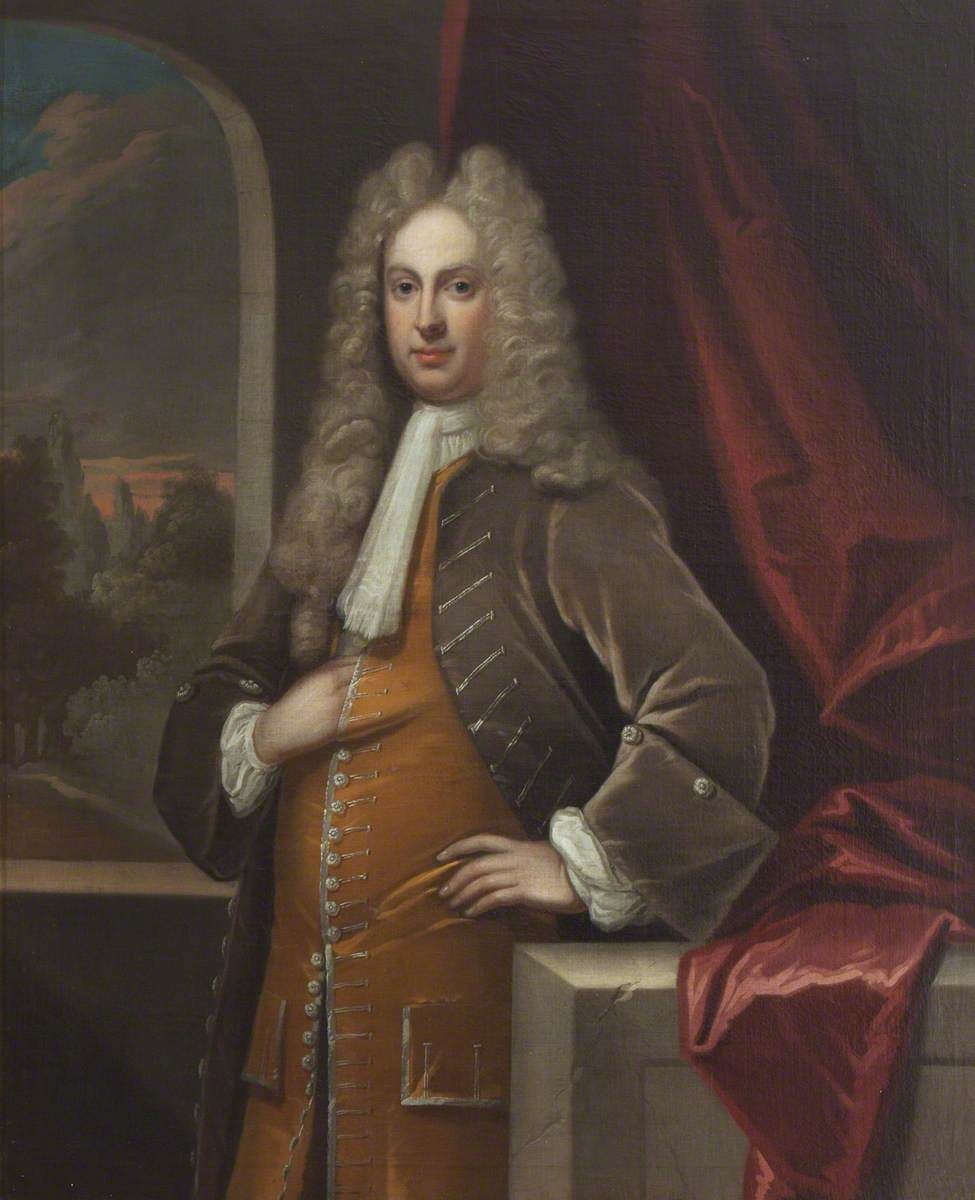

Member of Parliament for Newcastle-under-Lyme
- In office 1715–1715 Serving with Rowland Cotton
- Preceded by: William Burslem; Rowland Cotton
- Succeeded by: Sir Brian Broughton; Crewe Offley

Member of Parliament for Staffordshire
- In office 1713–1715 Serving with Ralph Sneyd
- Preceded by: William Ward; Charles Bagot
- Succeeded by: William Ward; Lord Paget

Personal details
- Born: April 1686
- Died: 19 February 1719 (aged 32)
- Spouse(s): Anne Pigott (m. 1708; died 1714) Matilda Wright (died 1719)
- Relations: Sir Thomas Vernon (grandfather); Sir Charles Vernon (uncle); Henry Vernon (cousin)
- Children: George Venables-Vernon, 1st Baron Vernon; Anna Lockwood
- Parent(s): George Vernon; Catherine Vernon

Henry Vernon (April 1686 – 25 February 1719), of Sudbury, Derbyshire, was an English landowner and politician.

== Early life ==
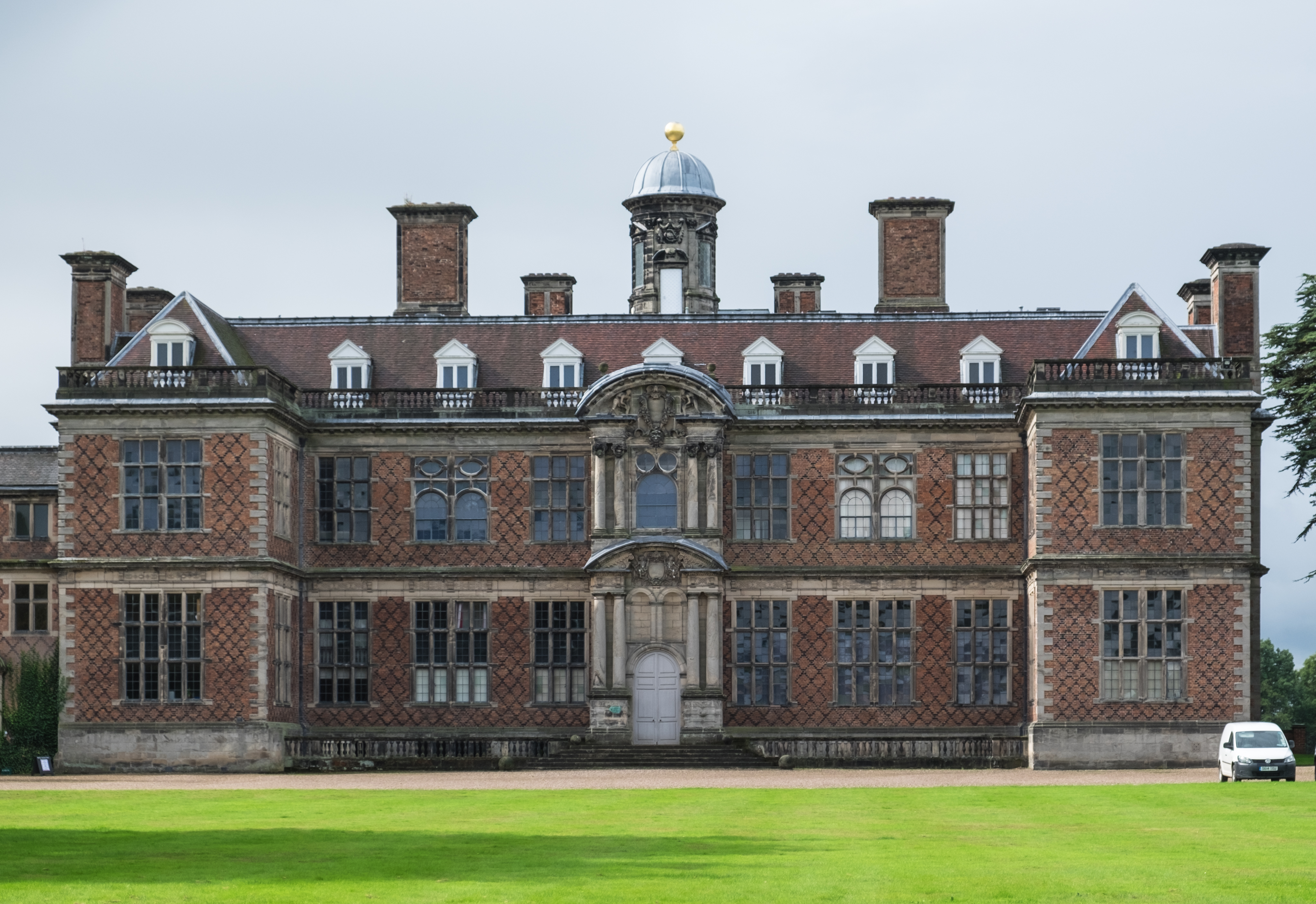
Sudbury Hall

Vernon was born in April 1686 as the only surviving son of George Vernon (1635–1702), MP for Derby, and his third wife, Catherine Vernon. His father had previously been married to Margaret Oneley (daughter and heiress of Edward Oneley) and Dorothy Shirley (daughter of Sir Robert Shirley, 4th Baronet, of Staunton Harold Hall).

His paternal grandparents were Sir Henry Vernon of Sudbury Hall, Derbyshire and Muriel Vernon (daughter of heiress of Sir George Vernon, Judge of Common Pleas). Eleven generations of Vernons lived at Haslington Hall until his grandmother Muriel married her distant cousin, Sir Henry Vernon and their estates merged. His paternal uncle, Henry Vernon, was MP for Stafford from 1711 to 1715 and his son, Vernon's first cousin, Henry Vernon, was MP for Lichfield and Newcastle-Under-Lyme from 1761 to 1762 who was the father of Henrietta Grosvenor. His maternal grandparents were Ann Weston (daughter of Henry Weston of Ockham, Surrey) and Sir Thomas Vernon, London merchant and MP for City of London, Among his maternal uncles were Thomas Vernon, MP for Whitchurch, and Sir Charles Vernon, MP for Chipping Wycombe and Ripon. His maternal aunt Judith was the wife of Dr. Stephen Waller of Hall Barn and John Aislabie, Chancellor of the Exchequer under George I, in 1713.

== Career ==
Vernon succeeded to his father's estates in 1702. The Vernons of Sudbury acquired Swynnerton and Hilton in Staffordshire, by marriage, in 1557. Vernon's grandfather left Sudbury to his eldest son, George, Vernon's father, and Hilton to his second son, the grandfather of Henry Vernon of Hilton.

He was returned as Member for Staffordshire from 1713 to 1715, and then returned as a Tory in 1715 to Newcastle-under-Lyme, but unseated on petition.

== Personal life ==
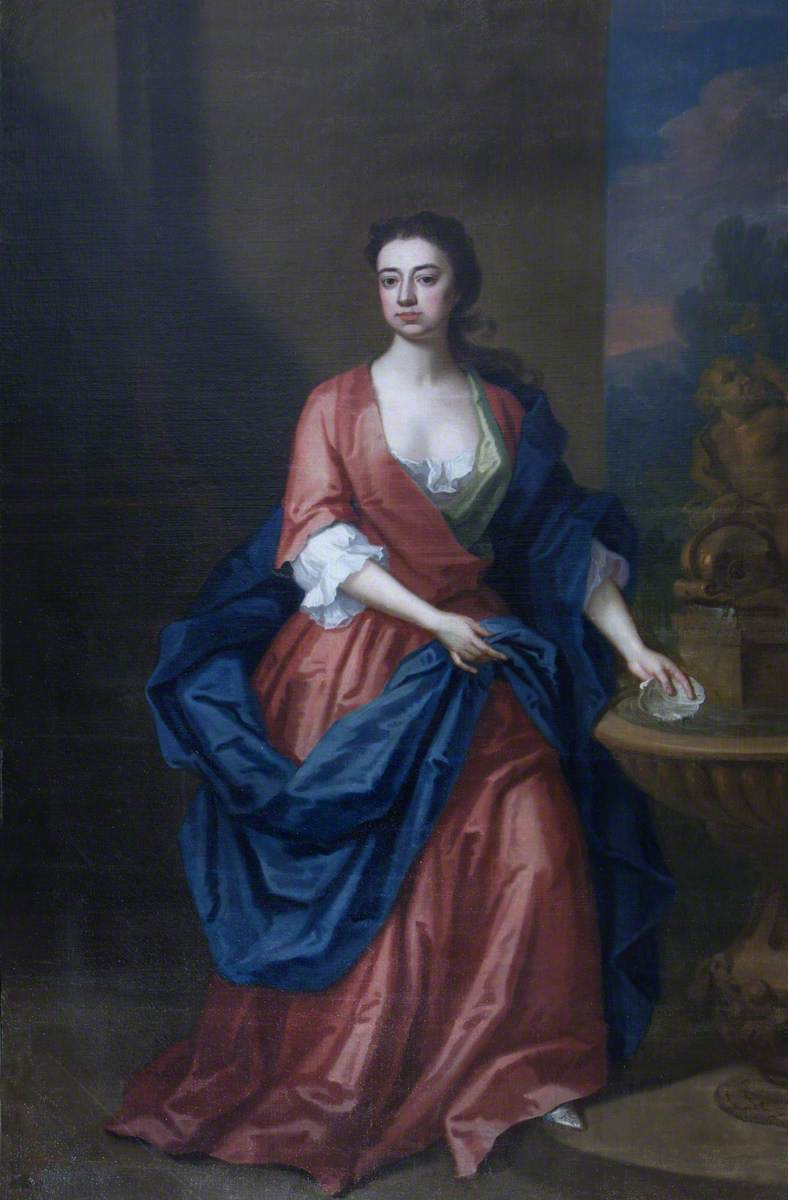
Portrait of his first wife, Anne Pigott, by Michael Dahl, between 1710 and 1715

Vernon was married to Anne Pigott (1693–1714), daughter and heiress of Thomas Pigott of Chetwynd by his wife Mary Venables (sister and heiress of Sir Peter Venables of Kinderton, Cheshire). Together, they were the parents of one son and one daughter, including:

- George Vernon (1709–1780), MP for Lichfield and Derby who was created 1st Baron Vernon in 1762; he married the Hon. Mary Howard, daughter of Thomas Howard, 6th Baron Howard of Effingham. After her death he married Ann Lee, daughter of Sir Thomas Lee, 3rd Baronet, of Hartwell. After her death, he married Martha Harcourt, daughter of the Hon. Simon Harcourt (a younger son of Simon Harcourt, 1st Viscount Harcourt) and sister to Simon Harcourt, 1st Earl Harcourt, in 1744.
- Anna Catherine Vernon (1710–1757), who married her cousin, Richard Lockwood, son of Richard Lockwood and Matilda (née Vernon) Lockwood.

After Anne's death in 1714, Vernon married Matilda Wright, a daughter of Thomas Wright of Longstone, Derbyshire.

Vernon died on 25 February 1719 and was succeeded in his estates by his only son, George.

== Ancestry ==
Ancestors of Henry Vernon (1686–1719)

8. Sir Edward Vernon
4. Sir Henry Vernon
9. Margaret Vernon
2. George Vernon
10. Sir George Vernon
5. Muriel Vernon
11. Jane Corbet
1. Henry Vernon
12. Henry Vernon
6. Sir Thomas Vernon
13. Joan Winter
3. Catherine Vernon
14. Henry Weston
7. Anne Weston
15. Katherine Ford

== Sources ==
- Brydges, Edgerton (1812). Collins's Peerage of England. Vol. VII. London.

Parliament of Great Britain
Preceded by William Ward; Charles Bagot	Member of Parliament for Staffordshire; 1713–1715; With: Ralph Sneyd	Succeeded by William Ward; Lord Paget
Preceded by William Burslem; Rowland Cotton	Member of Parliament for Newcastle-under-Lyme; 1715–1715; With: Rowland Cotton	Succeeded by Sir Brian Broughton; Crewe Offley
