= Henry Tilson =

Henry Tilson may refer to:

- Henry Tilson (bishop)
- Henry Tilson (painter)
