= Henry Bilson-Legge =

British politician (1708–1764)

The Right Honourable Henry Bilson-Legge FRS
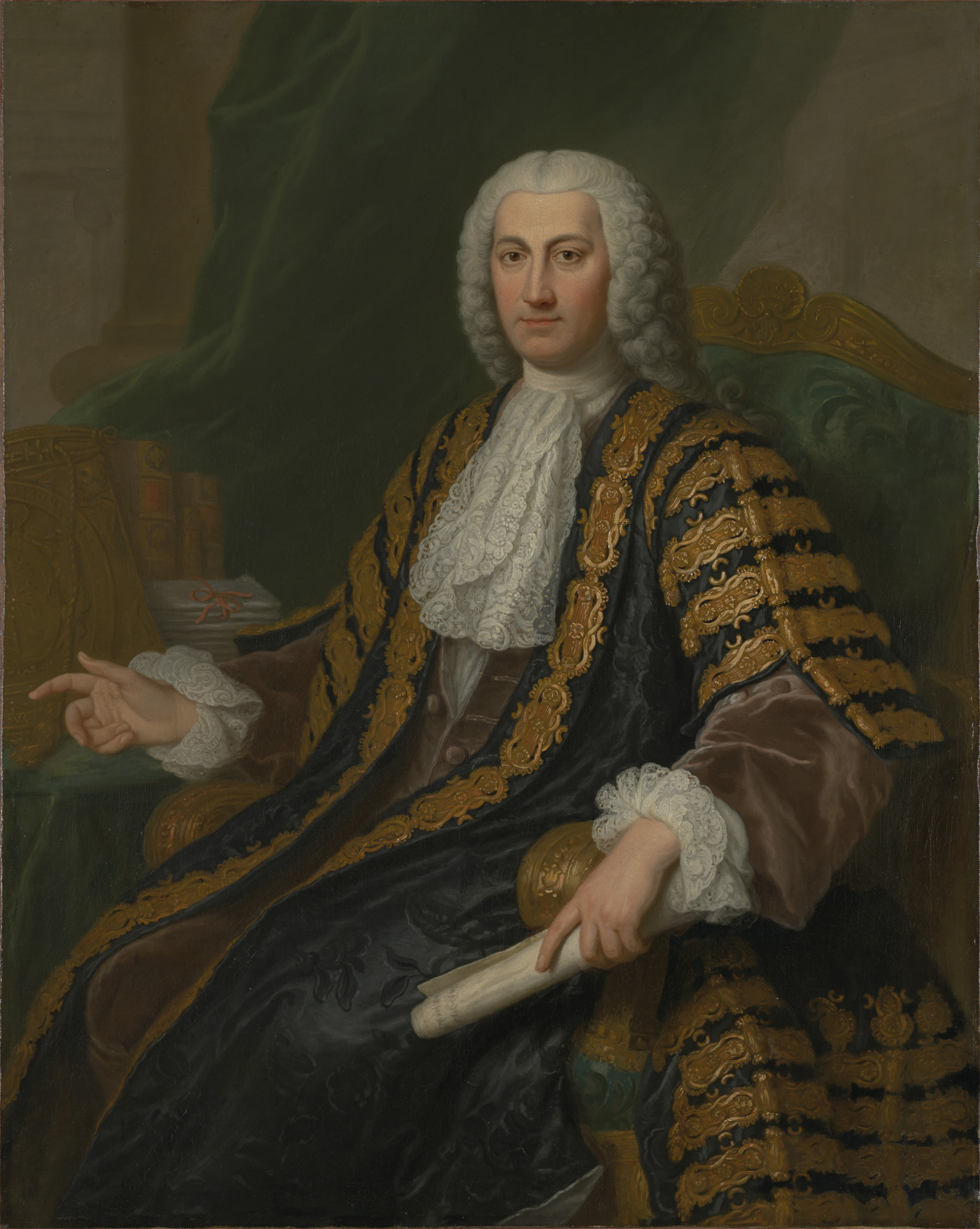
- Henry Bilson-Legge in the robes of state for the Chancellor of the Exchequer by William Hoare, c. 1754–55

Chancellor of the Exchequer
- In office 2 July 1757 – 19 March 1761
- Monarchs: George II; George III
- Prime Minister: The Duke of Newcastle
- Preceded by: The Lord Mansfield (interim)
- Succeeded by: The Viscount Barrington
- In office 16 November 1756 – 13 April 1757
- Monarch: George II
- Prime Minister: The Duke of Devonshire
- Preceded by: Sir George Lyttelton, Bt
- Succeeded by: The Lord Mansfield (interim)
- In office 6 April 1754 – 25 November 1755
- Monarch: George II
- Prime Minister: The Duke of Newcastle
- Preceded by: Sir William Lee (interim)
- Succeeded by: Sir George Lyttelton, Bt

Personal details
- Born: 29 May 1708
- Died: 23 August 1764 (aged 56)
- Party: Whig
- Spouse: Mary, Lady Stawell (later Countess of Hillsborough)
- Children: Henry
- Education: Christ Church, Oxford

Henry Bilson-Legge PC FRS (29 May 1708 – 23 August 1764) was a British politician. He notably served three times as Chancellor of the Exchequer in the 1750s and 1760s.

== Background and education ==
Bilson-Legge was the fourth son of William Legge, 1st Earl of Dartmouth, by his wife Lady Anne, daughter of Heneage Finch, 1st Earl of Aylesford. He was educated at Christ Church, Oxford.

== Political career ==
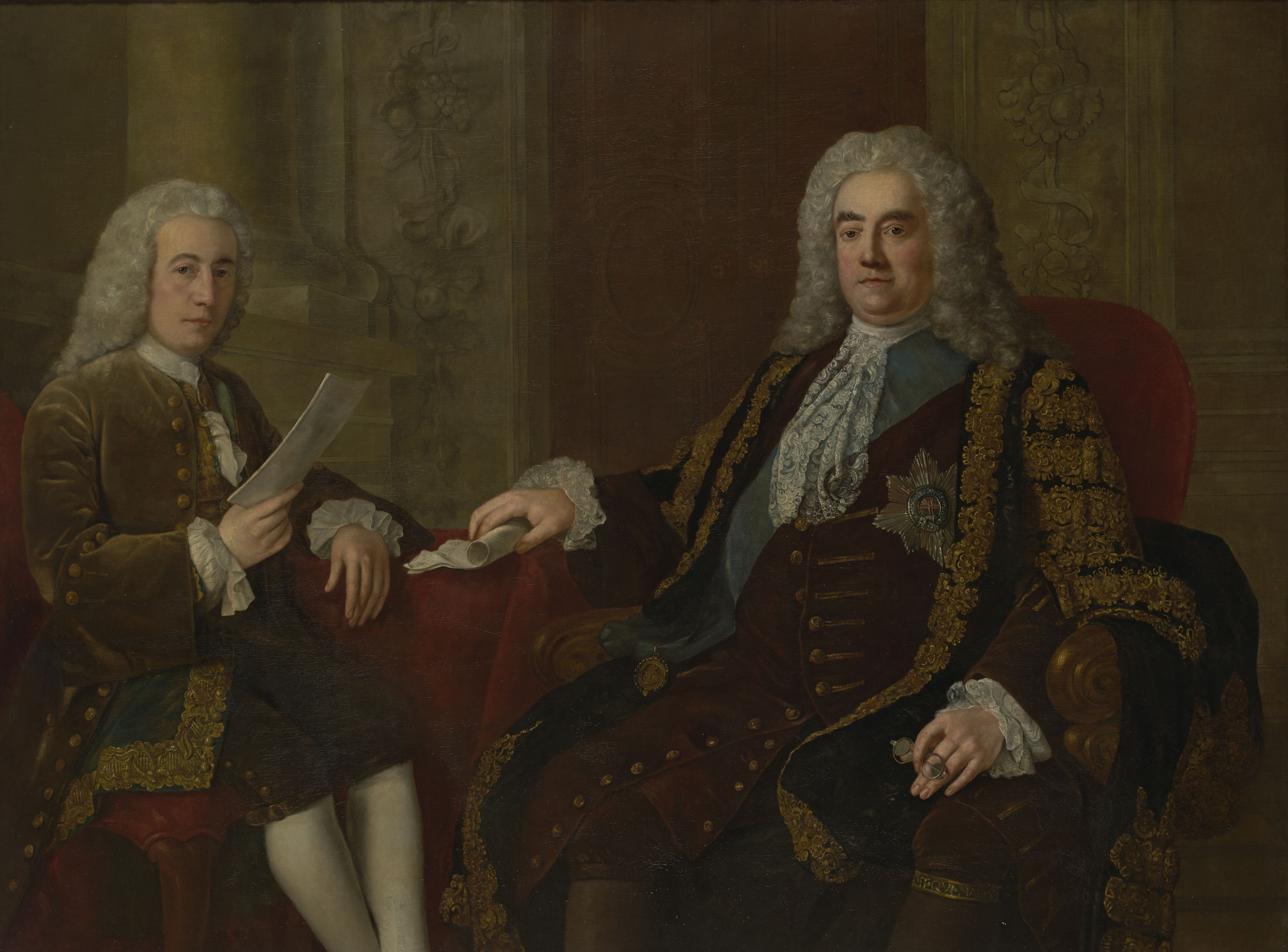
Legge with his patron, Robert Walpole

He became private secretary to Sir Robert Walpole. In 1739 was appointed Chief Secretary for Ireland by the Lord Lieutenant, William Cavendish, 3rd Duke of Devonshire; being chosen Member of Parliament for the borough of East Looe in 1740, and for Orford, Suffolk, at the general election in the succeeding year.

Legge only shared temporarily in the downfall of Walpole, and became in quick succession Surveyor-General of Woods and Forests, a Lord of the Admiralty, and a Lord of the Treasury. In 1748 he was sent as envoy extraordinary to Frederick the Great, and although his conduct in Berlin was sharply censured by George II, he became Treasurer of the Navy soon after his return to England. In April 1754 he joined the ministry of the duke of Newcastle as chancellor of the Exchequer, the king consenting to this appointment although refusing to hold any intercourse with the minister; but Legge shared the elder Pitt's dislike of the policy of paying subsidies to the Landgrave of Hesse, and was dismissed from office in November 1755.

Twelve months later he returned to his post at the exchequer in the administration of Pitt and the 4th Duke of Devonshire, retaining office until April 1757 when he shared both the dismissal and the ensuing popularity of Pitt. When, in conjunction with the Duke of Newcastle, Pitt returned to power in the following July, Legge became chancellor of the exchequer for the third time. He imposed new taxes upon houses and windows, and the king refused to make him a peer.

In 1754 Legge took the additional name of Bilson on secondarily succeeding to the West Mapledurham estate in Buriton near Petersfield, Hampshire of his cousin, Leonard Bilson MP (1681-1715 - son of Susanna Legge, sister of Henry Legge's grandfather, George Legge, 1st Baron Dartmouth) upon the death of the original heir, Thomas Bettesworth, without issue.

In 1759 he obtained the sinecure position of surveyor of the petty customs and subsidies in the port of London, and having in consequence to resign his seat in parliament he was chosen one of the members for Hampshire, a proceeding which greatly incensed the Earl of Bute, who desired this seat for one of his friends. Having thus incurred Bute's displeasure Legge was again dismissed from the exchequer in March 1761, but he continued to take part in parliamentary debates until his death at Tunbridge Wells in 1764.

Pitt called Legge, the child, and deservedly the favourite child, of the Whigs. Horace Walpole said he was of a creeping, underhand nature, and aspired to the lion's place by the manoeuvre of the mole, but afterwards he spoke in high terms of his talents.

He "was a person of great abilities, both as a statesman and financier, and went through most of the great offices of government with reputation and integrity, and quitted them to the great regret of the nation in general."

== Family ==
Henry Bilson-Legge married Mary Stawell, daughter and heiress of Edward Stawell, 4th and last Baron Stawell (d. 1755). In 1760, Mary, who had been made 1st Baroness Stawell of the second creation, bore Henry Bilson-Legge's only child, Henry (1757–1820), who became the 2nd Baron Stawell on his mother's death in 1780. When the 2nd Baron Stawell died without sons the title became extinct again. His only daughter, Mary (d. 1864), married John Dutton, 2nd Baron Sherborne.

Parliament of Great Britain
Preceded by Charles Longueville; Samuel Holden	Member of Parliament for East Looe; 1740–1741; With: Charles Longueville	Succeeded by James Buller; Francis Gashry
Preceded by Richard Powys; John Cope	Member of Parliament for Orford; 1741–1759; With: Lord Glenorchy 1741–46; The Viscount Bateman 1746–47; Hon. John Waldegrave 1747–54; John Offley 1754–59	Succeeded by John Offley; Charles FitzRoy
Preceded by Alexander Thistlethwayte; The Marquess of Winchester	Member of Parliament for Hampshire; 1759–1761; With: Alexander Thistlethwayte 1759–61; Simeon Stuart 1761–65	Succeeded by Simeon Stuart; Sir Richard Mill, Bt
Diplomatic posts
Unknown	British Envoy to Prussia; 1749–1749	Succeeded by Charles Hanbury Williams
Political offices
Preceded by Thomas Townshend	Chief Secretary for Ireland; 1739–1741	Succeeded by Viscount Duncannon
Preceded by Francis Whitworth	Surveyor General of Woods and Forests; 1742–1745	Succeeded by John Phillipson
Preceded by George Dodington	Treasurer of the Navy; 1749–1754	Succeeded by George Grenville
Preceded by Sir William Lee	Chancellor of the Exchequer; 1754–1755	Succeeded by Sir George Lyttelton, Bt
Preceded by Sir George Lyttelton, Bt	Chancellor of the Exchequer; 1756–1757	Succeeded by The Lord Mansfield
Preceded by The Lord Mansfield	Chancellor of the Exchequer; 1757–1761	Succeeded by The Viscount Barrington
