= Edward Vaughan Williams =

British judge

Sir Edward Vaughan Williams (6 June 1797 – 2 November 1875) was an English judge.

== Life ==
Born Blithfield, Staffordshire, he was the eldest surviving son of Welsh barrister John Williams. He was educated first at Winchester College from 1808, and moved to Westminster School in 1811. In 1816, he began his studies at Trinity College, Cambridge, graduation with a BA in 1820 and an MA in 1824.

After leaving university, Williams entered Lincoln's Inn as a student, and, after reading in the chambers of John Patteson and then with John Campbell, was called to the bar on 17 June 1823. He first joined the Oxford Circuit, where he soon found work; but when South Wales was detached and became an independent circuit, he travelled on that and the Chester Circuit.

In October 1846, Williams was made a puisne judge of the court of common pleas, and received a knighthood on 4 February 1847. Some of his major judgements were in the following cases: Earl of Shrewsbury v. Scott, 6 CB. NS. 1 (Roman Catholic disabilities); Behn v. Burness, 1 B. & S. 877 (warranties in charter parties); Johnson v. Stear, 15 CB. NS. 30 (measures of damages in trover); and Spence v. Spence, 31 L. J. C. P. 189 (application of Rule in Shelley's Case).

Williams retired from the bench in 1865 owing to increasing deafness; and was created a Privy Councillor and a member of the Judicial Committee of the Privy Council. He died on 2 November 1875 at 24 Queen Anne's Gate, Westminster, which had been his home since 1836. He was buried at Wotton, near Dorking. A scholar and man of letters, he associated with Dean Milman, William Buckland, Richard Trench, and Henry George Liddell.

A portrait of Williams in oils, by James Sant, passed into the possession of the family.

== Works ==
In 1824, with John Patteson, he brought out a fifth edition of his father's notes on Saunders's Reports and established his reputation in common-law learning. In 1832, the first edition of Williams's Treatise on the Law of Executors and Administrators was published. The text became and standard authority and seven editions were published during William's lifetime.

Williams also edited Richard Burn's Justice of the Peace in conjunction with Serjeant D'Oyley in 1836, and Saunders's Reports in 1845 and 1871.

== Family ==
In 1826, he married Jane Margaret Bagot, the eighth daughter of the Rev. Walter Bagot, brother to William Bagot, 1st Baron Bagot. Together they six sons. His fifth son, Roland Vaughan Williams, became Lord Justice of the Court of Appeal in 1897. His grandson was the composer Ralph Vaughan Williams.
