= Raimund Faltz =

- Born: July 4, 1658; Stockholm
- Died: May 21, 1703 (aged 44); Berlin
- Known for: Medallist
- Movement: Baroque

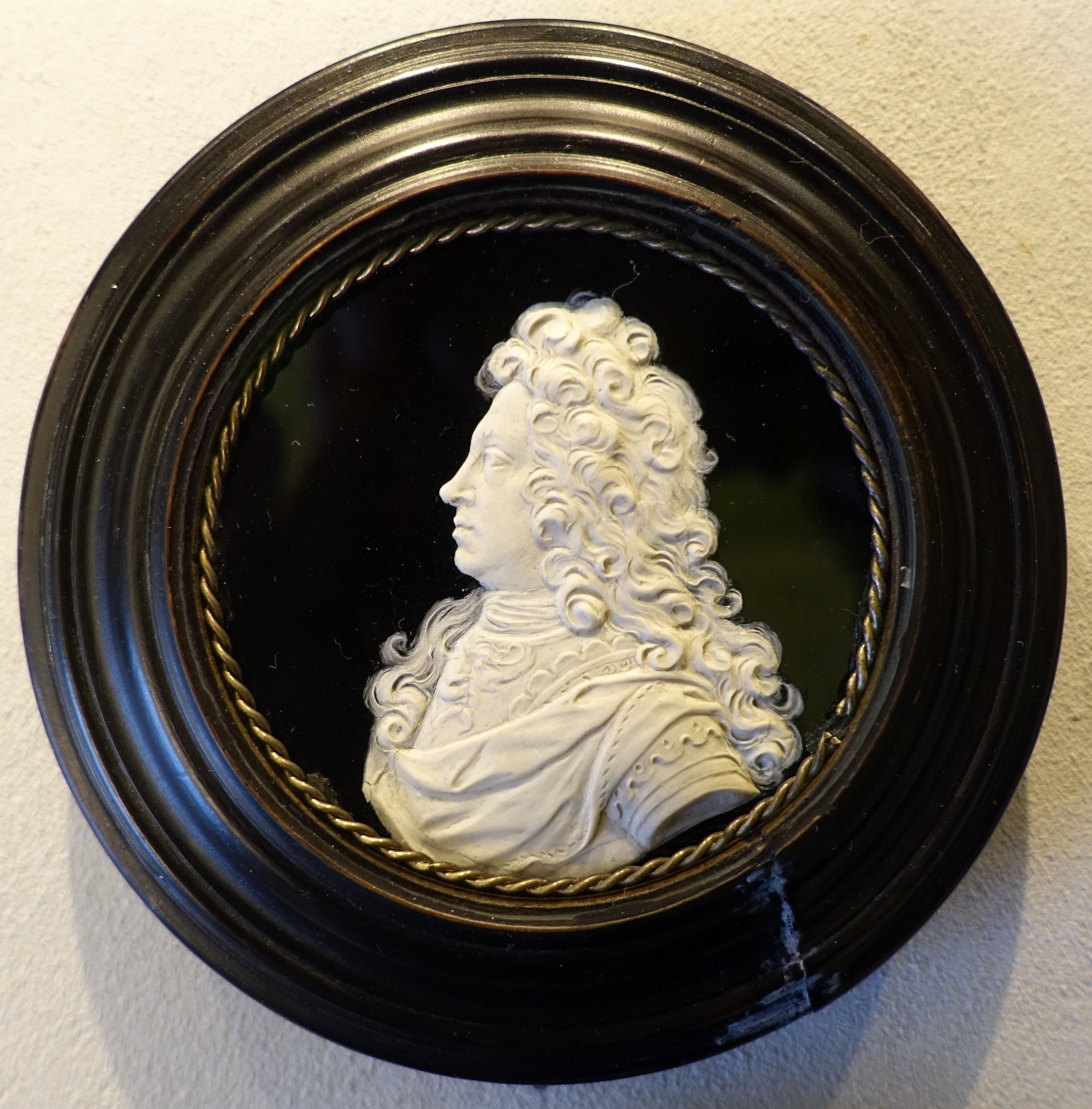
George I of Great Britain (Georg Ludwig of Brunswick-Lüneburg), wax model for medallion by Raimund Faltz, 1700

Raimund Faltz (1658-1703) was a medallist active in Germany. Faltz was born in Stockholm, studied under medallist Charles-Jean-François Chéron in Paris, and in 1688 moved to Berlin where he made a large number of medals and reliefs until his death.
