= Greville Phillimore =

Greville Phillimore (1821–1884) was a priest of the Church of England and hymnal compiler.

== Life ==
He was the fifth son of Joseph Phillimore. He was educated successively at Westminster School, Charterhouse School, and Christ Church, Oxford, where he graduated B.A. in 1842, and M.A. in 1844. Taking holy orders, he was curate at Henley-on-Thames and at Shiplake. In 1851 he became vicar of Downe-Ampney, near Cricklade in Gloucestershire; and in 1867 he returned as rector to Henley, where he remained until, in July 1883, he accepted the crown living of Ewelme There he died on 20 January 1884.

== Works ==
Phillimore was joint editor with James Russell Woodford and Hyde Wyndham Beadon of The Parish Hymn Book (1863; enlarged edition of 1875). This was one of the first books to give exposure to John Mason Neale's translations of Greek hymns. Phillimore contributed, besides translations, eleven original hymns, several of which were then reprinted in other collections.

His Parochial Sermons were published in 1856 (London; 2nd edit. 1885), and he was author of ‘Uncle Z,’ a story of Triberg, in the Black Forest (1881), and ‘Only a Black Box, or a Passage in the Life of a Curate’ (1883). A memorial volume, printed at Henley in 1884, and edited by his daughter Catherine, contained his hymns and some sermons.

== Family ==
He married, on 16 April 1857, Emma Caroline, daughter of Captain Ambrose Goddard (1779–1854) of the Lawn, Swindon, M.P. for Cricklade from 1837 to 1841.
