= William Ward (1677–1720) =

British politician

William Ward (1677–1720) was a British politician who sat in the House of Commons between 1710 and 1720.

Ward was the eldest surviving son of Hon. William Ward of Willingsworth in Sedgley and his wife Anne Parkes, daughter of William Parkes of Willingsworth. He travelled abroad in 1692 and attended Padua University in 1694. He married Mary Grey, daughter of the Hon. John Grey of Enville on 25 May 1700.

Ward was returned unopposed as Member of Parliament for Staffordshire at the 1710 general election but did not stand in 1713. He was returned unopposed again as MP for Staffordshire at the 1715 general election and sat until his death.

Ward died on 25 October 1720. He and his wife had three sons and four daughters. His son, John Ward succeeded his second cousin as Baron Ward in 1740 and to the entailed Dudley estates, and was created Viscount Dudley and Ward in 1763.

Parliament of Great Britain
Preceded by John Wrottesley; Henry Paget	Member of Parliament for Staffordshire; 1710–1713; With: Henry Paget 1710–1712; Charles Bagot 1712–1713	Succeeded by Ralph Sneyd; Henry Vernon
Preceded by Ralph Sneyd; Henry Vernon	Member of Parliament for Staffordshire; 1715–1720; With: Lord Paget	Succeeded by Hon. William Leveson-Gower; Lord Paget
