= Michael Dahl =

Swedish painter (1659–1743)

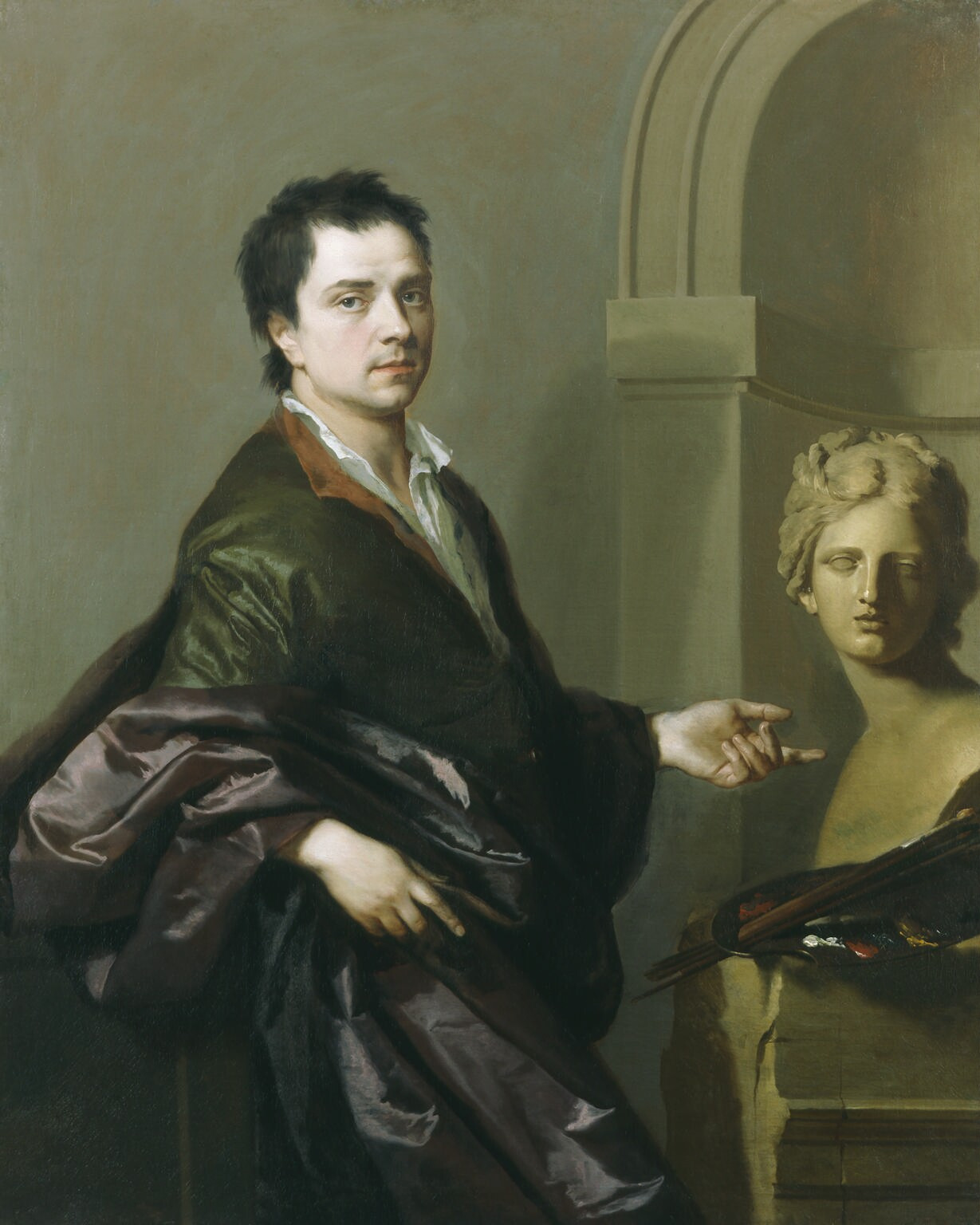
- Self-portrait, 1691
- Born: 1656 or 1659; Stockholm, Sweden
- Died: 20 October 1743 (aged 84 or 87); London, England
- Known for: Portrait painting
- Notable work: Portraits of Sir John Pole, Anne, Queen of Great Britain and her husband Prince George of Denmark
- Movement: Baroque

Michael Dahl (1656/1659 – 20 October 1743) was a Swedish painter who specialised in portrait painting and spent most of his career in England. He was one of the most internationally known Swedish painters of his time. Dahl painted portraits of aristocracy and royalty such as Anne, Queen of Great Britain, Prince George of Denmark and the exiled Christina, Queen of Sweden.

== Childhood ==
Michael Dahl was born in Stockholm, in 1656 or 1659: most of the sources point to 1659. His mother, Catarina Dahl, is assumed to have made many silent sacrifices to give Michael the opportunity of a good education, so that his talent was not to be wasted. According to letters written by Michael from Rome to his mother back in Sweden, she had raised him and his sister in an old-fashioned way and in the spirit of Christianity.

== First studies ==
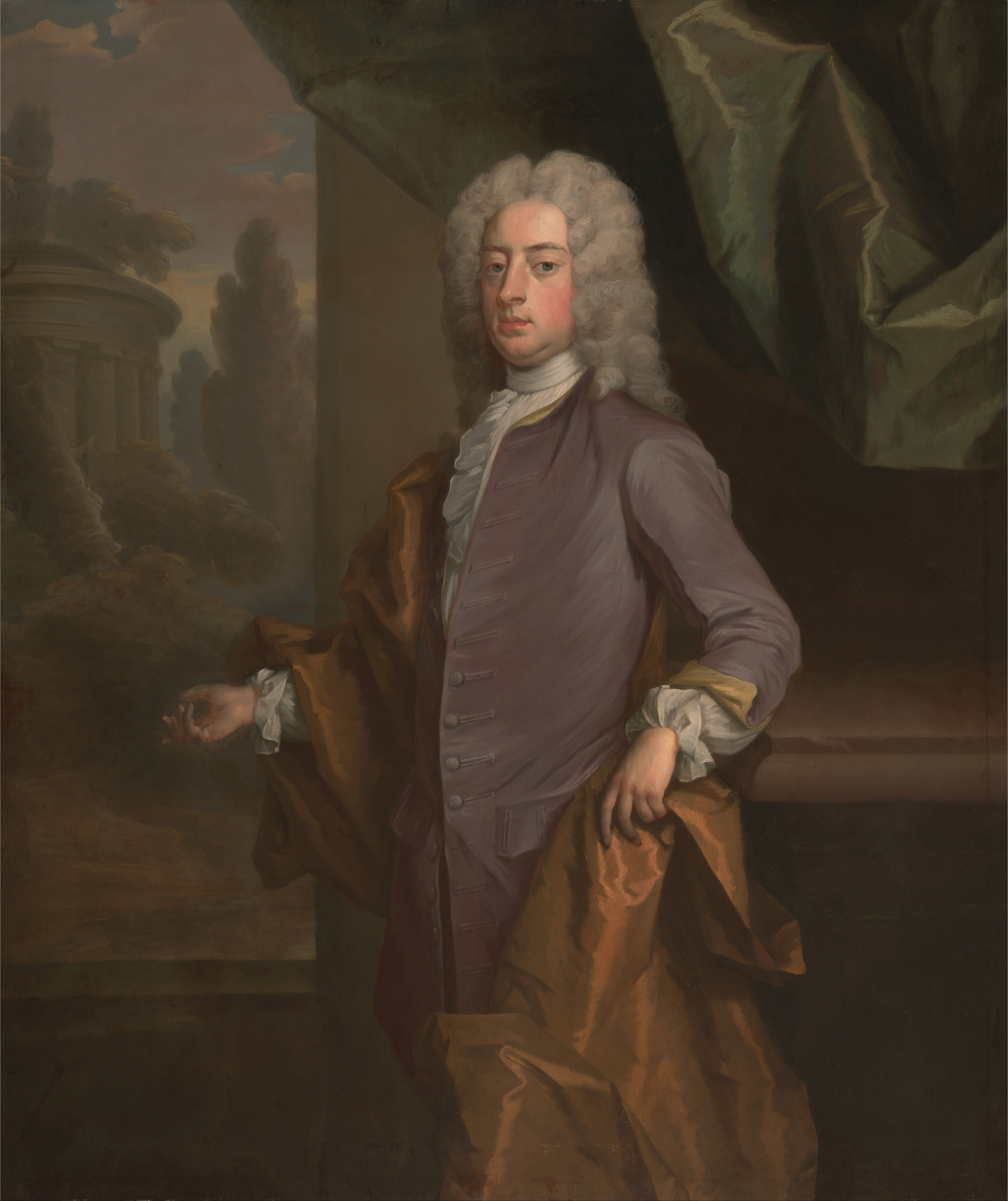
Michael Dahl – portrait of an unknown man

At the age of at least 15 years, Dahl had to decide where he was going to study art, though the only options in Sweden at the time were an apprenticeship in the Painters' Guild or joining the Martin Hannibal and David Klöcker Ehrenstrahl group.

Dahl received his first lessons in art in 1674 from the Hungarian-born drawing-master Martin Hannibal, who had been requested to come to Sweden from Italy by the prominent Swedish painter David Klöcker Ehrenstrahl to aid him in the foundation of a portrait academy and to teach students and amateurs the first elements of painting. The Hannibal and Ehrenstrahl group consisted of a handful of students who were taught by Martin Hannibal and David Klöcker Ehrenstrahl. Since there were two teachers, the group was divided. The students were first under the leadership of Hannibal to learn the basics of painting, and if they showed skill, they had the chance of being picked out to continue their study with Ehrenstrahl. This would suggest that Ehrenstrahl was a better painter than Hannibal, whose talent is not easily assessed as none of his work has been identified.

The only competition of the same league as the Hannibal and Ehrenstrahl group, was Martin Mijtens the Elder, who did not settle in Stockholm until 1681 and was therefore not an option for Dahl in the mid-seventies. The Painters' Guild was not an option for Dahl either, due to its lack of contemporary well-known artists as members. Thus Dahl started to study in the Hannibal and Ehrenstrahl group in 1674. Though it is not fully confirmed, there are assumptions that the teaching Dahl received from Hannibal was finished before they ever had permission from the authorities in Sweden to open a portrait academy. After his time with Hannibal, Dahl was one of the students who were allowed to continue with Ehrenstrahl as the teacher. From this it is possible to tell that Hannibal and Ehrenstrahl were pleased with Dahl as a student. In the group there were mainly students of German origin and the ones contemporary with Dahl were Ludvig Weyandt, David von Krafft, David Richter the Elder, Hans Georg Mϋller, Andreas von Behn and Erik Utterhielm.

== Travels ==
=== England ===
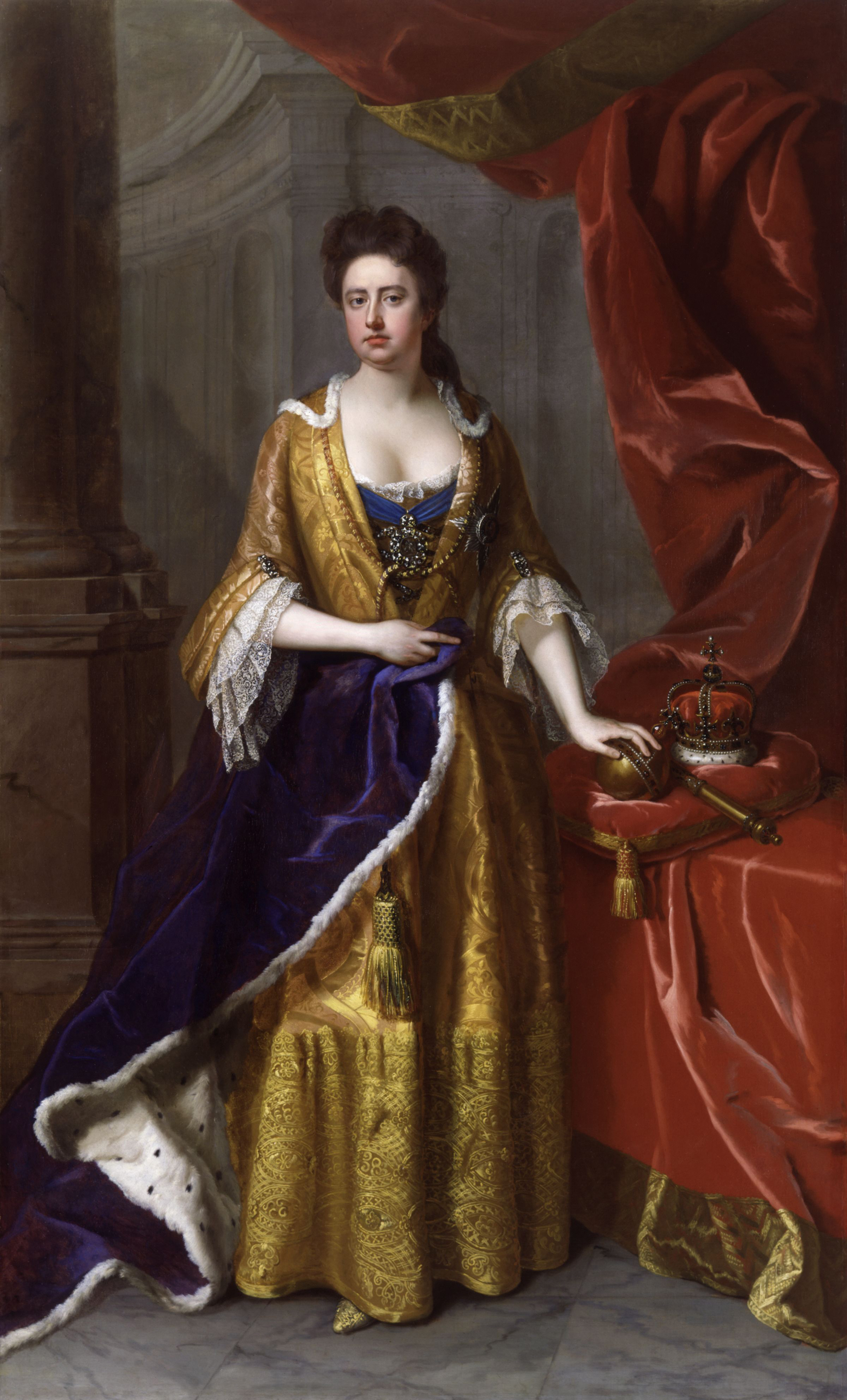
Portrait of Anne, Queen of Great Britain, painted by Dahl in 1705

On 30 July 1682, Dahl was issued a passport to be able to travel throughout Europe for the sake of his studies. His first destination on this educational journey was London. He was brought there by an English merchant called Sowter, though his name may vary. It is probable that it was through this man that Dahl came in contact with the skilled engraver and painter Robert White. The earliest trace of Dahl's activity in England is a portrait of Samuel Clarke, which he copied from White's engraving the same year as it was made. White took Dahl under his wing in the world of painting in London. As a token of gratitude, Dahl aided White with valuable ideas when it came to engraving a portrait of the king of Sweden, Charles XI, employing his familiarity with the royal paintings Dahl had observed in the studio of Ehrenstrahl. White helped Dahl expand his network in London and he soon came in contact with the man who is probably responsible for the greatest impact on his development, Godfrey Kneller.

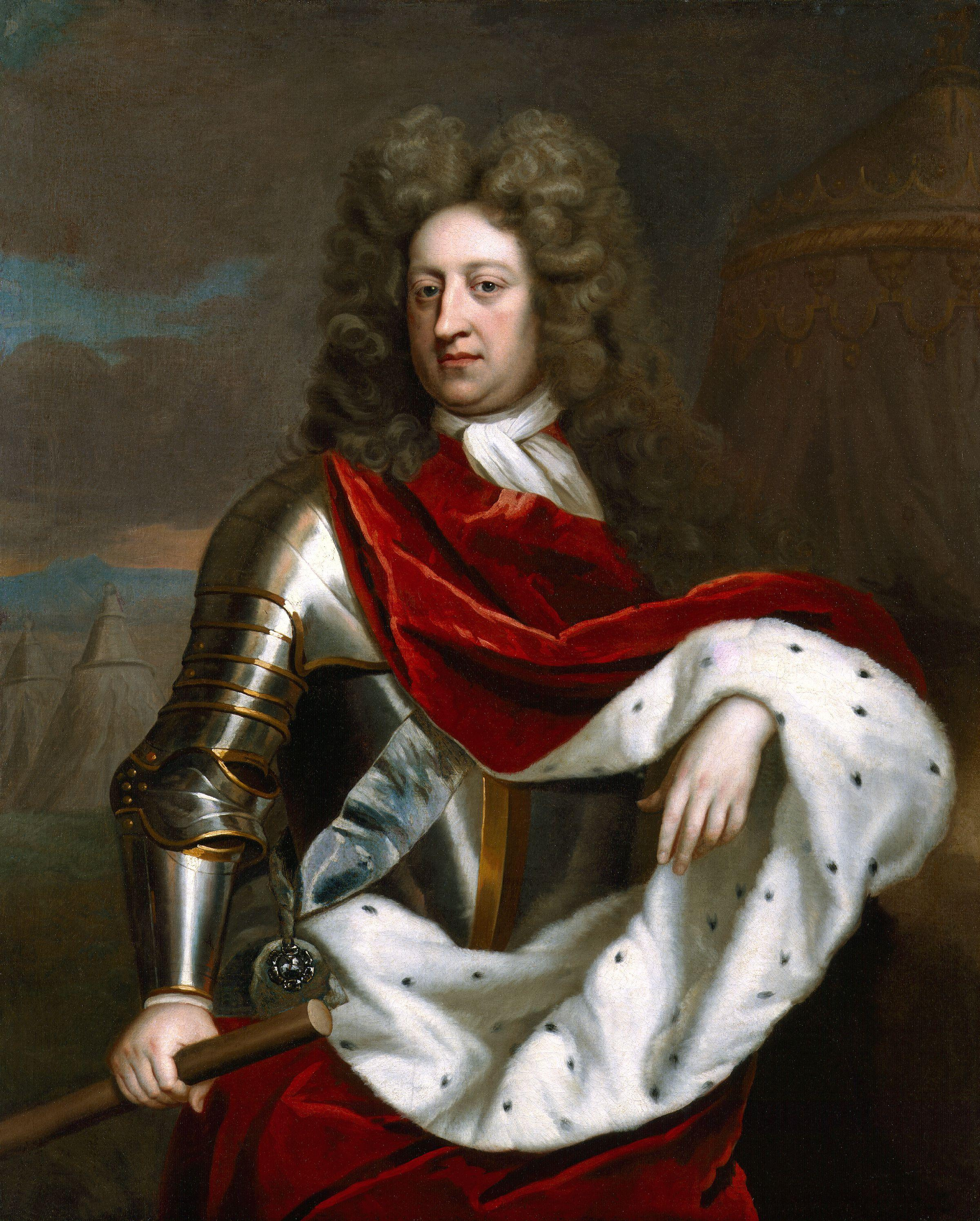
Portrait of Anne's consort, Prince George of Denmark, painted by Dahl in 1705

Kneller showed Dahl what the public really wanted from artists, and how they were going to get paid for their work. His studio was factory-like compared with Ehrenstrahl's, which Dahl's biographer Wilhelm Nisser terms "Ehrenstrahl's monopoly of glorifying Swedish Royalty". In Kneller's studio, Dahl both studied and made a living and there he became acquainted with Henry Tilson. Tilson was from a highly respected family and had earlier studied under the Court portrait painter Sir Peter Lely. He was considered one of the most promising painters of Lely's pupils. Dahl and Tilson started to plan a journey around Europe to expand their studies. They were to go to Paris, Venice and Rome.

=== Paris and Rome ===
Lack of documentation makes it impossible to determine when Dahl and Henry Tilson left for Paris, but it is known that they were still working in Paris in April 1685. Paris at that time was a common objective for Swedish travelers. Dahl came in contact with the engraver Raimund Faltz and the Swedish soldier Carl Johan Königsmarck, who had his portrait painted by Dahl. Like many of the younger generation of French painters, Dahl and Tilson decided to continue on to Venice then Rome. At that time, the Swedish queen Christina, who had abdicated to convert to Roman Catholicism, was living in Rome. She still had a strong bond to Sweden and its people and was helpful when it came to assisting Swedish artists in the city. Therefore, the first thing Dahl did upon his arrival was to seek an audience with her. He was able to get the audience, but Christina was only a link to the higher powers in the city, such as the Pope, so to get the assistance Dahl needed from Christina, Dahl had to convert to the Roman Catholic Church as she had done. After some persuasion he eventually did, but the promises which were undoubtedly made to him were not withheld. At several occasions, Christina let Dahl paint her portrait and she was able to establish an opportunity for Dahl to show a specimen of his work to Pope Innocent XI. The Pope was impressed and awarded Dahl a gold medal. Dahl was not the only artist Christina was able to convert. David Richter the Elder who Dahl had studied with at Ehrenstrahl's, was converted when he visited Rome a few years earlier, in 1679.

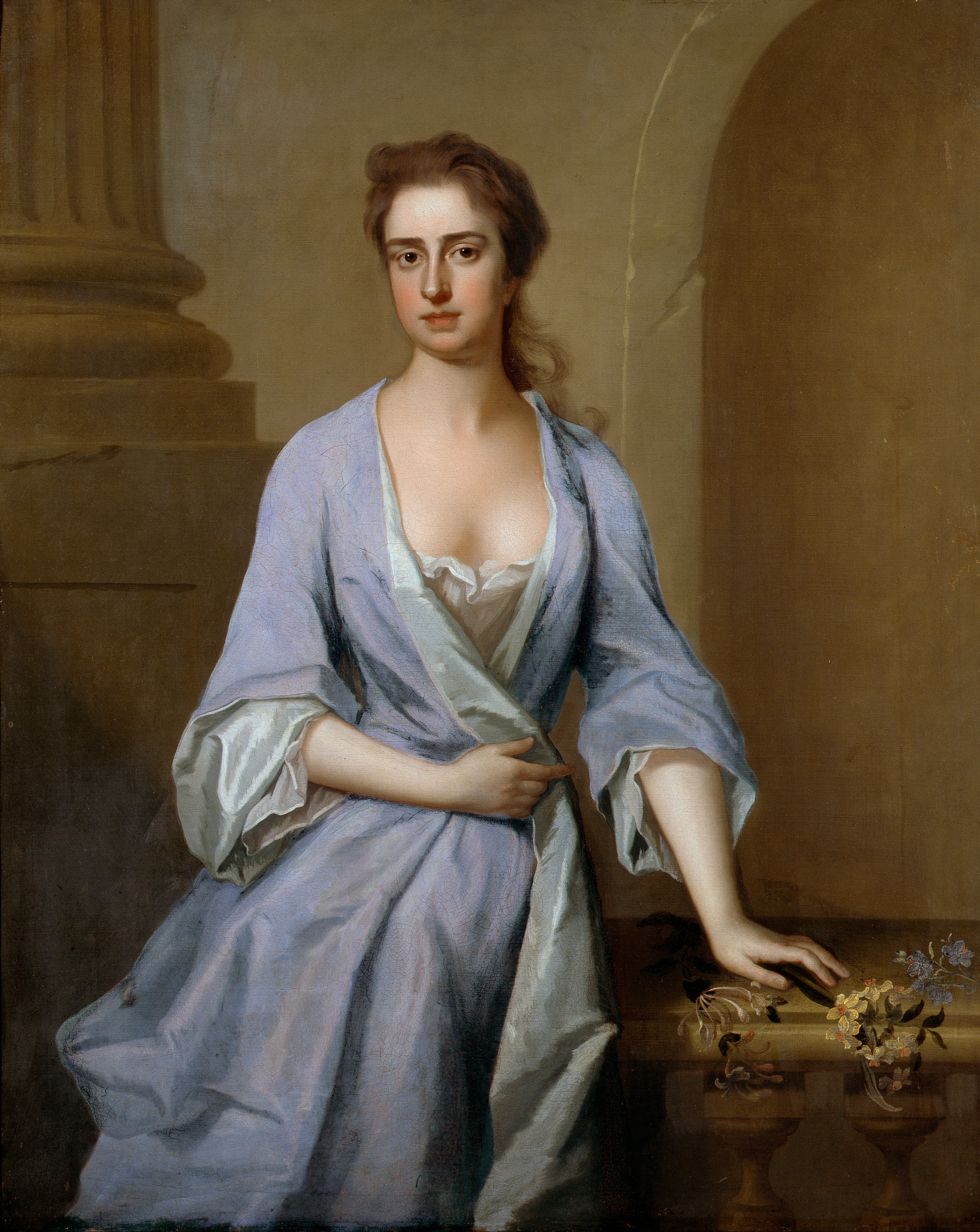
Dahl, Portrait of a Lady

Dahl had now been travelling for over five years, and his purse was getting thin. On 6 October 1687 he wrote a letter to his mother; in it he expresses his strong desire to return home, but that the conditions in Sweden are too poor due to the Swedish Resumption/Patents act, which restricted all possibilities of a career in Sweden for Dahl. Christina seems to have given her consent, as a passport for a journey Rome–London was issued on 29 October to Henry Tilson, just over three weeks after Dahl wrote the letter to his mother. In November the same year two other Swedish painters, Burchardt Precht and Nicodemus Tessin the Younger, came to study in Rome and they do not appear to have been in any contact with Dahl or Tilson, so presumably the two young painters left immediately after the passport had been issued.

== Back in England ==
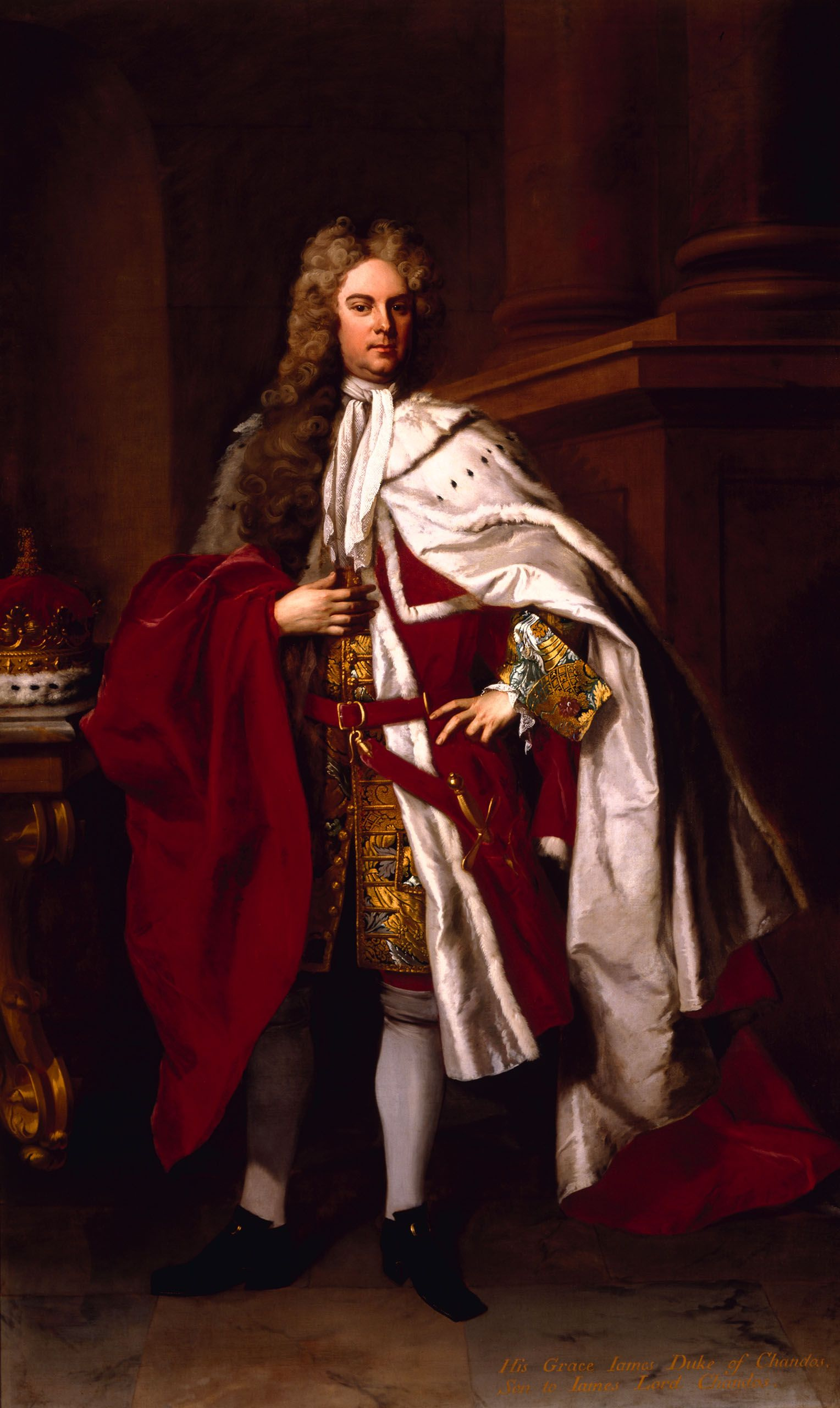
Portrait of James Brydges, Duke of Chandos (c. 1719)

After the departure from Rome, the two painters were to be found briefly in Frankfurt in July 1688; there Dahl met the young Swedish nobleman Claes Ekeblad of Stola who paid him a ducat to paint for him for three weeks. In his diary he refers to Dahl as a "famous painter of Swedish extraction". This suggests that Dahl's reputation had greatly increased by his successes in Rome and that the journey was far from wasted both in the aspect of fame and in the aspect of study.

In March 1689 Dahl and Tilson were back in London, and Dahl started to work on living up to his new reputation. He quickly became friends with the poet Christoffer Leijoncrona who was Secretary of the Swedish Legation. For Dahl, Leijoncrona was a very helpful ally when it came to keeping in touch with his native country. Dahl adapted to his new life and after three years in London he had transformed into a young London dandy, who paid his attentions to a certain Mlle. Fanchou, though she was not the woman he was to marry. In 1696, thanks to Leijoncrona, he was able to settle in the neighborhood of the Swedish Legation in the fashionable quarter of Leicester Field (now Leicester Square). Leijoncrona also helped Dahl to win fame back in Sweden, and two years after he settled in London, on 5 October 1698, the well-known metallurgist Erik Odhelius writes in a letter: "Courteous greetings to Mr Dahl, whose renown daily increases here."

Dahl kept advancing in reputation, and in 1696 he painted the portrait of Charles Seymour, 6th Duke of Somerset who found him to his liking even though the Duke was known for being a very despotic and difficult man to handle. The Duke continued to hire Dahl and for over 20 years he painted members of the Duke's family. In 1705 he got the chance of painting several versions of the portrait of Prince George of Denmark. It was undoubtedly through the Prince that he came into the circles around Queen Anne, whose portrait he also painted.

In 1705 Dahl married a young English girl whose name has still not been recovered. Together they had a son, Michael, and two daughters, Dorothy and Catherine. The family was very respected by art-interested people in the neighborhood and lived a pleasant life there until 1725, when they moved to Beak Street, which today is at the south end of Carnaby Street. When Sir Godfrey Kneller died in 1723, George I needed to find a new court painter and he was looking in Dahl's direction. This, however, was quickly aborted when Dahl refused to paint the portrait of the Duke of Cumberland, who was only two. Dahl had taken the request as somewhat a disgrace of his talent according to what Lord Egmont wrote in his diary about the incident:

"He refused to draw the Duke of Cumberland, when two years old, desiring the lord who went down to ask it to tell His Majesty that not having had the honour of painting him or his royal consort he was unwilling to begin with a child." King George was furious at this reply, and it ruined all Dahl's opportunities of being knighted.

Michael Dahl died in London on 20 October 1743 and was buried a week later in St James's Church, Piccadilly.
