= John Williams (barrister) =

Welsh lawyer and writer

John Williams KS (12 September 1757 – 27 September 1810) was a Welsh lawyer and writer on legal topics.

== Life ==
Born near Carmarthen, Williams was educated at Carmarthen Grammar School before matriculating at Jesus College, Oxford, in 1773. He moved to Wadham College, Oxford, later the same year and graduated with degrees of BA (1776) and MA (1781). He became a fellow of Wadham in 1780, acting as librarian (1781–1782) and humanity lecturer (1782), resigning his fellowship in 1792. In the meantime he had joined Middle Temple and was called to the bar in 1784. From 1790 he was the guardian of John Jones of Ystrad. He was appointed a serjeant-at-law in 1794 and a king's serjeant in 1804. He died in London and was buried in the Temple Church.

== Works ==
His writings included the tenth and eleventh editions (with Richard Burn) of Blackstone's Commentaries on the Laws of England (1787 and 1791) and the third edition of Sir Edmund Saunders's Reports of Cases and Pleadings in the Court of King's Bench in the Reign of Charles II, with additional notes and references. These notes were retained in later editions and were eventually issued on their own in an edition by Williams's son, Edward.

== Family ==
In 1789 Williams married Mary, eldest daughter of Charles Clarke of Forebridge, near Stafford. They had three sons: Charles, Edward (a judge) and John (a colonel in the Royal Engineers). There were also three daughters, including Mary, who married Augustus Hobart-Hampden, 6th Earl of Buckinghamshire.

Williams was the grandfather of Sir Roland Vaughan Williams, who served as Lord Justice of Appeal from 1897 to 1914, and the great-grandfather of the composer Ralph Vaughan Williams.
