= William Leveson-Gower (died 1756) =

British Member of Parliament (died 1756)

William Leveson-Gower (16 March 1697 – 13 December 1756) was a British Tory politician who sat in the House of Commons for 36 years from 1720 to 1756.

Leveson-Gower was the second son of John Leveson Gower, 1st Baron Gower and Lady Catherine Manners (1675–1722), daughter of John Manners, 1st Duke of Rutland. He was baptised on 27 March 1697 at Lilleshall, Shropshire. He married Anne Grosvenor, daughter of Sir Thomas Grosvenor, 3rd Baronet, MP of Eaton Hall, Cheshire on 26 May 1730.

Leveson-Gower was returned unopposed as a Tory Member of Parliament for Staffordshire at a by-election on 29 December 1720, and was returned again at the next four general elections of 1722, 1727, 1734 and 1741. He consistently voted against the Government until in 1744, he went over to the Administration with his brother Lord Gower. He was re-elected in 1747 after a bitterly contested election. In 1751 he went into opposition with the Duke of Bedford, and severed his political connection with his brother. In December 1751, the Princess Emily wanted him to be made treasurer to the Prince of Wales and auditor to herself, but Pelham insisted that he ask for Lord Gower's interest, which he refused to do. He voted in January 1752 with the Administration on the Saxon subsidy treaty, which the Duke of Bedford had opposed in the House of Lords, but subsequently reverted to opposition. He was returned at the 1754 and was classed as a member of the Bedford group, then in opposition.

In May 1756, Leveson Gower had 'a stroke of palsy in the House of Commons'. He died six months later, leaving one daughter. He was also the brother of Thomas Leveson-Gower and Baptiste Leveson-Gower who were also MPs.

Parliament of Great Britain
Preceded by Lord Paget; William Ward	Member of Parliament for Staffordshire; 1720–1756; With: Lord Paget; Sir Walter Wagstaffe Bagot 1727 (Sir) William Bagot 1754	Succeeded by (Sir) William Bagot; Hon. Henry Thynne
