= Thomas Paget, Lord Paget =

English politician

Thomas Catesby Paget or Pagett (1689 – 4 February 1742) styled Hon. Thomas Catesby Paget from 1712 to 1714, and subsequently with the courtesy title Lord Paget, was an English writer and politician, who sat in the House of Commons from 1715 to 1727. He served in the household of King George II for nearly 17 years, until ill-health intervened.

== Early life ==
Paget was born in 1689, the son of Hon. Henry Paget, later Earl of Uxbridge, and his wife Mary Catesby, daughter of Thomas Catesby of Whiston, Northamptonshire. He was admitted at Clare College, Cambridge on 20 April 1705 and matriculated at Trinity College, Oxford on 19 April 1707 aged 18. His father was much concerned in 1710 to gain Paget's release when he was captured by French forces during the War of the Spanish Succession, as he tried to make his way in southern Germany to Italy.

== Political career ==
At the 1715 general election, Paget was returned unopposed as Member of Parliament for Staffordshire. In 1719 he was appointed Gentleman of the Bedchamber to George, Prince of Wales. He was returned without contest again as MP for Staffordshire in 1722. At the 1727 general election he chose to stand for Middlesex as a Whig, but was defeated. He never stood for Parliament again but was promoted to Lord of the Bedchamber to King George II in 1727. In 1736, he resigned his post at court on grounds of ill-health.

== Literary works ==
Paget composed pieces in verse and prose – according to Horace Walpole "in the intervals of bad weather in hunting seasons". His verse has been described as exhibiting a "tough cynicism". Walpole said his works included much good sense but not much poetry. They included:

- An Essay on Human Life, London (1734); a close imitation of Alexander Pope. It was printed in a supplement to the Works of Pope in 1757.
- An Epistle to Mr. Pope, in Anti-heroics, London, 1737
- Some Reflections upon the Administration of Government (anon.), London, 1740

His writings were collected in Miscellanies in Prose and Verse (1741).

== Death and legacy ==
Paget died at West Drayton on 4 February 1742 (N.S.), and was buried on 19 February in Westminster Abbey. He had married Lady Elizabeth Egerton, daughter of John Egerton, 3rd Earl of Bridgwater on 6 May 1718, in Gray's Inn Chapel. They had two sons:

- Henry Paget, 2nd Earl of Uxbridge (1719–1769)
- Hon. George Paget (1720–1737), who died at Colchester

Parliament of Great Britain
Preceded by Ralph Sneyd; Henry Vernon	Member of Parliament for Staffordshire; 1715–1727; With: William Ward 1715–1720; William Leveson-Gower 1720–1727	Succeeded by William Leveson-Gower; Sir Walter Bagot
