= Mary Hill, Countess of Hillsborough =

English peeress

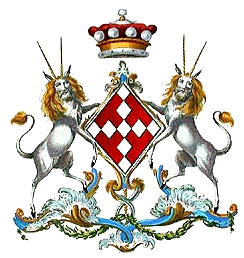
Arms of Lady Hillsborough

Mary Hill, Countess of Hillsborough (née Stawell; 27 January 1726 – 29 July 1780) was an English peeress, a daughter of Edward Stawell, 4th Baron Stawell.

On 11 September 1750, she married Henry Bilson-Legge (a son of the 1st Earl of Dartmouth) and they later had a son, Henry (1757–1820). Upon the death of her father in 1755, she inherited her father's estate but not his title, but was later created Baroness Stawell, of Somerton in the County of Somerset, in 1760, in her own right.

Her husband died in 1764 and in 1768 she married the 1st Earl of Hillsborough and became Countess of Hillsborough. Her second husband was created Marquess of Downshire after her death.

== Notes ==
Peerage of Great Britain
| New creation | Baroness Stawell; 2nd creation 1760–1780 | Succeeded by Henry Bilson-Legge |
