= Ralph Sneyd (MP for Staffordshire) =

English politician

Ralph Sneyd (1692 – October 1733) was an English politician who sat in the House of Commons from 1713 to 1715.

Sneyd's grandfather and great-uncle were also MPs. He was educated at Magdalen College, Oxford. He was elected in 1713 shortly after his 21st birthday. He was classed as a Tory but he was a relatively inactive MP and did not contest the 1715 election.

During the 1715 riots Sneyd led a mob that attacked the Dissenting meeting house in Newcastle-under-Lyme, for which he was indicted. In July 1717 he was appointed a justice of the peace and in 1725 he was appointed a deputy lieutenant.

His cousin William Sneyd was elected MP for Lichfield in 1718.

== Notes ==
Parliament of England
Preceded by Charles Bagot; William Ward	Member of Parliament for Staffordshire; 1713–1715; With: Henry Vernon	Succeeded by Thomas Paget; William Ward
