= Baron Stawell =

Barony in the Peerage of Great Britain

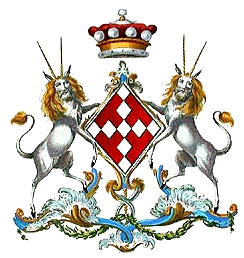
Arms of Stawell: Gules, a cross lozengy argent, in a lozenge-shaped shield for a female armiger. The supporters are satyrals.

Baron Stawell was a title that was created twice in British history. The first creation came in the Peerage of England in 1683 when Colonel Ralph Stawell was made Baron Stawell, of Somerton in the County of Somerset. The title became extinct on the death of the fourth Baron in 1755. The Honourable Mary, daughter of the fourth Baron, married the prominent politician the Honourable Henry Bilson-Legge, fourth son of William Legge, 1st Earl of Dartmouth (see Earl of Dartmouth for earlier history of the Legge family). She inherited the Stawell estates and in 1760 the barony held by her father was revived when she was raised to the Peerage of Great Britain as Baroness Stawell, of Somerton in the County of Somerset, with remainder to her sons by her first husband. In 1768 Lady Stawell married as her second husband Wills Hill, 1st Earl of Hillsborough (later 1st Marquess of Downshire). She was succeeded by her only son, the second Baron. He had no male issue and the barony became extinct on his death in 1820.

== Barons Stawell; First creation (1683) ==
- Ralph Stawell, 1st Baron Stawell (d. 1689)
- John Stawell, 2nd Baron Stawell (d. 1692)
- William Stawell, 3rd Baron Stawell (d. 1742)
- Edward Stawell, 4th Baron Stawell (d. 1755)

== Barons Stawell; Second creation (1760) ==
- Mary Bilson-Legge (née Stawell), 1st Baroness Stawell (1726–1780)
- Henry Bilson-Legge, 2nd Baron Stawell (1757–1820)

== See also ==
- Earl of Dartmouth
- Marquess of Downshire
