= Henry Bilson-Legge, 2nd Baron Stawell =

British aristocrat (1757–1820)

Henry Bilson-Legge

2nd Baron Stawell
- In office 1780–1820

Personal details
- Born: 22 February 1757
- Died: 25 August 1820 (aged 63)
- Spouse: Mary Curzon
- Children: 1
- Parents: Henry Bilson-Legge (father); Mary Stawell (mother)

Henry Bilson-Legge, 2nd Baron Stawell (22 February 1757 – 25 August 1820) was a British peer and landowner, serving as a member of the House of Lords from 1780 until his death in 1820.

Stawell was the only son of the statesman Henry Bilson-Legge, Chancellor of the Exchequer (himself a son of William Legge, 1st Earl of Dartmouth) by his marriage on 11 September 1750 to Mary Stawell (died 29 July 1780), the daughter of Edward Stawell, 4th Baron Stawell, who on her father's death succeeded to her father's estates but not his title. In 1760 she was created Baroness Stawell, of Somerton in the County of Somerset, in her own right, and this was the peerage later held by her son.

After his father's death in 1764 Stawell's mother married the Earl of Hillsborough (created Marquess of Downshire after her death), thus providing Stawell with a step-father.

Stawell came into a large fortune and was a patron of the Turf. He bred an Epsom Derby winner, Blucher.

In 1779, Stawell married Mary Curzon, daughter of Assheton Curzon, 1st Viscount Curzon, and they had one daughter, Mary (1780–1864), who married John Dutton, 2nd Baron Sherborne, and went on to have six children, including James Dutton, 3rd Baron Sherborne (1804–1883) and Ralph Heneage Dutton (1821–1892). They had no sons, so that the barony became extinct on Stawell's death in 1820.

== Notes ==
Peerage of Great Britain
Preceded by Mary Hill	Baron Stawell; 1780–1820	Extinct
