= Sir Walter Bagot, 5th Baronet =

English Tory politician (1702–1768)

Sir Walter Wagstaffe Bagot, 5th Baronet (3 August 1702 – 20 January 1768) of Blithfield Hall, Staffordshire was an English Tory politician who sat in the House of Commons between 1724 and 1768.

== Early life ==
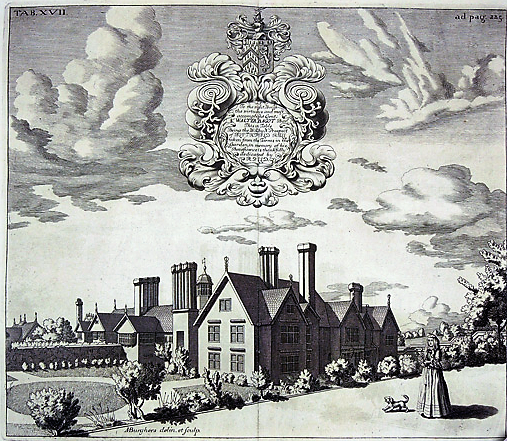
Blithfield Hall: Engraving of the north and west fronts, from Dr. Plot's Natural History of Staffordshire (1686)

Bagot was the eldest surviving son of Sir Edward Bagot, 4th Baronet, MP, and his wife Frances Wagstaffe, daughter of Sir Thomas Wagstaffe of Tachbrook, Warwickshire. In 1712, he succeeded his father to the baronetcy and Blithfield. He was educated at Isleworth and Colney Hatch, Middlesex and matriculated at Magdalen College, Oxford in 1720. He married Lady Barbara Legge, daughter of William Legge, 1st Earl of Dartmouth MP, on 27 July 1724.

== Career ==
Bagot was returned as a Tory Member of Parliament for Newcastle-under-Lyme at a by-election on 20 November 1724. He earned a reproach from his brother in law, Lord Lewisham, for his neglect of his parliamentary duties. At the 1727 British general election he was returned unopposed as MP for Staffordshire. He voted consistently against the government. He was returned unopposed again at the 1734 British general election. He made his only recorded speech on 26 February 1735, when he moved unsuccessfully for a clause to be included in the mutiny bill which would allow newly enlisted soldiers to obtain their immediate discharge if they wanted. In 1737 he became Trustee of the Radcliffe Library at Oxford and was granted a DCL He became founding governor of the Foundling Hospital in 1739. At the 1741 British general election, he was returned unopposed again as MP tor Staffordshire, but at the 1747 British general election he was returned after a fierce contest. His opponent petitioned but Bagot took part in a gathering to organize a subscription against the petition at the Lichfield races in September. This turned into a Jacobite demonstration against the Leveson Gower family who had changed their allegiance to the Whigs.

At the 1754 British general election Bagot withdrew from Parliament in favour of his son, William who was returned at Staffordshire. On 30 November 1762 Bagot reluctantly agreed to stand at the Oxford University by-election at the urging of Thomas Jenner, president of Magdalen. He was returned as MP for Oxford University on 16 December 1762. His first reported vote was on 10 February 1764, which was with the Administration against repealing the cider tax. The only other reported vote was on 27 February 1767 which was with the Opposition on the land tax. He was a board member of the High Tory Loyal Brotherhood.

== Death and legacy ==
Bagot died on 20 January 1768, leaving by his wife Barbara, eight sons and eight daughters. Their children included:

- William Bagot, 1st Baron Bagot (1728–1798)
- Charles Bagot (1730–1793), who married Catherine Legge, a niece of the Earl of Dartmouth, and who changed his name to Charles Chester by Act of Parliament in 1755.
- Reverend Walter Bagot of Pype Hayes Hall (1731–1808), who married firstly Anne Swinnerton; their daughter Louisa-Frances married Rev. Richard Levett of Milford Hall, Staffordshire. (Coincidentally, Sir Walter Wagstaffe Bagot had built a large home at Blithfield for Rev. Richard Levett, grandfather of the rector who later married into the Bagot family.) He married secondly Mary Ward; their daughter, Jane Margaret, married the English judge Sir Edward Vaughan Williams in 1826 and they were the grandparents of the composer Ralph Vaughan Williams.
- Richard Bagot (1733–1813), who married Frances Howard, a daughter of William Howard, Viscount Andover, and changed his name by Act of Parliament to Howard.
- Right Reverend Lewis Bagot (1740–1802)
- Charlotte Sneyd (died 8 October 1829), who married Davies Davenport of Capesthorne Hall and was mother to Edward Davies Davenport and grandmother to William Bromley-Davenport

Parliament of Great Britain
Preceded by Sir Brian Broughton; Thomas Leveson-Gower	Member of Parliament for Newcastle-under-Lyme; 1724–1727; With: Thomas Leveson-Gower	Succeeded by Baptist Leveson-Gower; John Ward
Preceded by Thomas Paget; William Leveson-Gower	Member of Parliament for Staffordshire; 1727–1754; With: William Leveson-Gower	Succeeded by William Leveson-Gower; William Bagot
Preceded by Peregrine Palmer; Sir Roger Newdigate	Member of Parliament for Oxford University; 1762–1768; With: Sir Roger Newdigate	Succeeded by Sir Roger Newdigate; Sir William Dolben
Baronetage of England
Preceded by Edward Bagot	Baronet (of Blithfield Hall); 1712–1768	Succeeded by William Bagot
