= Henry Tilson (painter) =

English portrait painter

Henry Tilson (1659 – 1695) was an English portrait-painter.

== Life ==
Henry Tilson, born in Yorkshire in 1659, was son of Nathaniel Tilson, and grandson of Henry Tilson (1576–1655), Bishop of Elphin and formerly chaplain to the Earl of Strafford in Ireland.

Tilson studied portrait-painting under Sir Peter Lely, and worked for him. After Lely's death in 1680, Tilson went to Italy with Michael Dahl, and they each painted the other's portrait while at Rome and exchanged them. On his return to England Tilson obtained some repute as a painter of portraits in oil and crayons, but in the stiff and heavy manner of the period. Being well connected, he was in the way of a successful career, when he shot himself, in 1695, at the age of thirty-six, through disappointment in love.

A portrait group of his father, Nathaniel Tilson, and family, and Tilson's own portrait by himself entered into the possession of the representative of the family, Henry Tilson Shaen Carter, Esq., of Watlington House, Oxfordshire. They were exhibited at the National Portrait Exhibition, South Kensington, in 1867.

== Bibliography ==
- Cust, Lionel Henry (1898). "Tilson, Henry" . In Lee, Sidney (ed.). Dictionary of National Biography. Vol. 56. London: Smith, Elder & Co. pp. 400–401.
