= John Patteson (judge) =

English judge

Sir John Patteson (11 February 1790 – 2 June 1861) was an English judge.

== Early life ==
The second son of the Rev. Henry Patteson of Drinkstone, Suffolk, by his wife, Sophia, daughter of Richard Ayton Lee, a London banker, he was born at Coney Weston, Suffolk, on 11 February 1790. He was at first educated at a school kept by his father's curate, a Mr. Merest, and then went to Eton College; his name first appears in the school lists in 1802, and in 1808 he was elected on the foundation. John Sumner was his tutor. In 1809 Patteson went with a scholarship at King's College, Cambridge, which, under the then existing privileges of king's scholars, entitled him to graduate without examination. He accordingly graduated B.A. in 1813, and M.A. in 1816. His university career was, however, distinguished. When the Davies university scholarship for classics was established, he was, in 1810, the first to win it, and in 1812 he was elected a Fellow of his college.

== Legal career ==
In 1813 Patteson entered the Middle Temple. In 1815 he went on the midland circuit as marshal to Sir Alan Chambré, read in the chambers of Godfrey Sykes, and of Joseph Littledale. In 1821 he began practice as a special pleader, and was called to the bar in the same year. He joined the northern circuit, and there, in competition with Edward Hall Alderson and James Parke, came to the fore in pleading. He was soon assisting Littledale in his work as counsel to the treasury. His progress was rapid, with his best argument said to have been in Rennell v. the Bishop of Lincoln.

He was one of the legal commissioners on the reform of the Welsh judicature, whose report led to the act of 1830, by which three additional judges were appointed—one in the king's bench, one in the common pleas, and one in the exchequer; and, though he had never been a King's Counsel, Lord Lyndhurst, in November, appointed him to the new judgeship in the court of king's bench, and he was knighted.

Deafness led Patteson to resign at the end of January 1852. On 2 February 1852 he was sworn of the privy council, and for some years served as a member of its judicial committee. Patteson also acted as a commissioner to examine into the state of the City of London in 1853, was frequently chosen arbitrator in government questions—such as disputes between the Crown and Duchy of Cornwall, and between the Post Office and the Great Western Railway—and his award terminated a long-standing rating dispute between the university and the town of Cambridge.

Failing health at last put an end to Patteson's judicial work. He died on 28 June 1861 at Feniton Court, Honiton, Devon, which he had purchased in 1841. Patteson edited, in 1824, John Williams's Notes on Saunders's Reports.

== Family ==
Patteson was twice married: first, on 23 February 1818, to his cousin Elizabeth, daughter of George Lee of Dickleburgh, Norfolk, by whom he had one daughter; and after her death on 3 April 1820, he married, on 22 April 1824, Frances Duke, daughter of James Coleridge and sister of John Taylor Coleridge, who died on 27 November 1842. One of their sons, John Coleridge Patteson, was ordained in the Church of England, became a missionary and the first Bishop of Melanesia, and, after his martyrdom in 1871, is remembered annually on the liturgical calendar on 20 September.

== Notes ==
Attribution

This article incorporates text from a publication now in the public domain: "Patteson, John (1790-1861)". Dictionary of National Biography. London: Smith, Elder & Co. 1885–1900.
