= Ralph Stawell, 1st Baron Stawell =

English landowner, soldier, MP and peer

Ralph Stawell, Baron Stawell (c.1641 – 1689) was an English landowner, soldier, Member of Parliament and peer.

Stawell was born around 1641, the fifth son (third surviving) of John Stawell (1600–1662), who was a Member of Parliament (MP) for Somerset and one of the leading Royalists in the West Country during the First Civil War. He succeeded an elder brother in 1669.

Around 1667 Stawell married Ann Ryves, a daughter of John Ryves. They had one son, John. Ann died in 1670, and in 1672 Stalwell married Abigail Pitt, daughter and heiress of William Pitt. They had two sons and four daughters.

In 1679, standing in the Tory or "court" interest, Stawell was returned as one of the two MPs for Bridgwater in Somerset. A Roman Catholic, on 15 January 1683/84 Stawell was created Baron Stawell, of Somerton in the County of Somerset. In 1688, the year of the Glorious Revolution, he was briefly Lord Lieutenant of Somerset. In a commission dated from London on 6 November 1688, the day after the landing in England of William, Prince of Orange, King James II appointed Stawell as his Lord Lieutenant in Somerset in place of Henry Waldegrave, who was the husband of the king's illegitimate daughter Henrietta FitzJames.

Some sources have claimed that with the success of the Revolution against James, Stawell was committed to the Tower of London, where he died in 1689. His parliamentary biography says that despite his appointment as Lord Lieutenant of Somerset by James II, Stawell at once rallied to William of Orange and makes no suggestion that he was imprisoned. It states he died on 8 August 1689 and was buried at Low Ham.

Stalwell's widow died in 1692, and is buried in St Mary's church, Hartley Wespall, Hampshire.

== Notes ==
Peerage of England
New creation	Baron Stawell; 1683–1689	Succeeded by John Stawell
