= François Chéron (medalist) =

French goldsmith, medallist, and painter

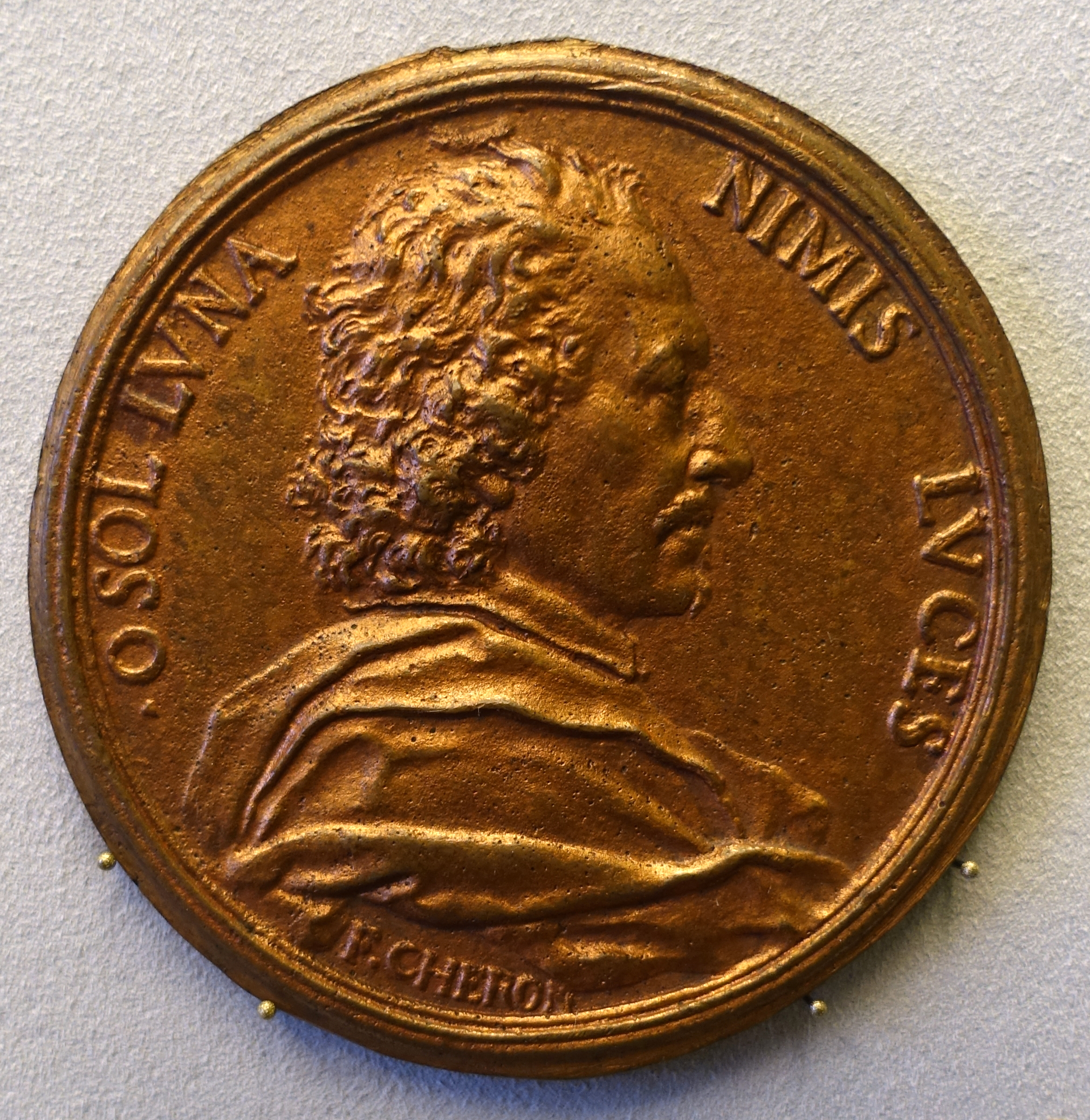
Self portrait by François Chéron, undated

Charles-Jean-François Chéron (1635–1698), often known as François Chéron, was a French goldsmith, medallist, and painter active in Rome and Paris; his cousin was the noted painter and poet Élisabeth Sophie Chéron. Chéron was born in Lunéville, where his father, Jean-Charles Chéron (fl. 1630s), was a jeweller and engraver to Charles IV, Duke of Lorraine. The younger Chéron moved to Rome in 1655 to help produce works for the Papal Mint. During his time in Rome, Chéron created medals of Pope Clement IX and Pope Clement X, Christina of Sweden, and Louis XIV of France (1672). In 1675, he was summoned to Paris by Louis XIV, and enrolled in the Académie royale de peinture et de sculpture in the subsequent year. His academy reception piece consisted of portrait medals of Charles Le Brun and others, with later work including a fine medal of Gian Lorenzo Bernini. Chéron was employed at the Medal Mint for 12 years, where he produced medals upon a wide variety of subjects and occasions. He died in Paris.
