= Edmund Saunders =

English judge

Sir Edmund Saunders (died 1683) was an English judge, promoted to a high position at the end of the reign of Charles II of England.

== Early life ==
He was born of poor parents in the parish of Barnwood, near Gloucester. According to Roger North, he obtained a living and a career in Clement's Inn by importuning the attorneys' clerks. He became a member of the Middle Temple, to which he was admitted on 4 July 1660. He was called to the bar earlier than the custom, on 25 November 1664.

== Barrister ==
His Reports make it clear that Saunders acquired a large practice at the bar: North says that he was honest, clever and a drinker. In 1680 Saunders defended Anne Price, who was indicted for attempting to suborn one of the witnesses in the Popish Plot; and in the same year he was assigned as counsel for William Howard, 1st Viscount Stafford, and the four other Catholic peers accused of high treason. In 1681 he appeared on behalf of the Crown against Edward Fitzharris and Anthony Ashley Cooper, 1st Earl of Shaftesbury, both of whom were indicted for high treason. In May 1682 he moved the king's bench for the discharge of Lord Danby, and in the following month he defended William Pain against the charge of writing and publishing letters suggesting that Sir Edmund Berry Godfrey had ‘murdered himself’.

In November 1682 he was elected a bencher of the Middle Temple.

== Lord Chief Justice ==
On the institution of the proceedings on quo warranto against the City of London, Saunders, who had advised the proceedings and settled all the pleadings, was appointed Lord Chief Justice of the King's Bench in the place of Francis Pemberton, who was moved to Chief Justice of the Common Pleas, because he was supposed to be less favourable to the crown.

Saunders was knighted at Whitehall Palace on 21 January 1683, and on the 23rd took his seat in the king's bench court for the first time, having previously been made a serjeant-at-law. The case of the king against the mayor and the commonalty of the city of London was argued before Saunders both in Hilary and in Easter term. On 8 May Saunders presided at the trial of the sheriffs of London and others for a riot at the election of new sheriffs, and succeeded in obtaining a verdict for the Crown. On 19 May he tried Sir Patience Ward for perjury in James, Duke of York's action against Thomas Pilkington.

== Death ==
On 22 May 1683 Saunders was taken ill while sitting on the bench. The judgment of the court in the quo warranto case was given on 12 June, while Saunders was on his deathbed, by Mr. Justice Jones, who announced that the chief justice agreed with his colleagues in giving judgment for the king and declaring the forfeiture of the charter.

In private life he took pleasure in his garden at Parson's Green. He never married. His age was not known, but he was thought not to be much past fifty.

== Works ==
In 1666 Saunders began his well-known Reports in the King's Bench. They extend from Michaelmas 1666 to Easter 1672, and were first published in 1686, with the records in Latin and the arguments in French. Their concision led Lord Mansfield to call him the "Terence of reporters".

His judgments are in the second volume of Bartholomew Shower's King's Bench Reports (1794). He was the author of Observations upon the Statute of 22 Car. II, cap. 1, entituled an Act to prevent and suppress Seditious Conventicles, London, 1685.

== Notes ==
Attribution

This article incorporates text from a publication now in the public domain: "Saunders, Edmund". Dictionary of National Biography. London: Smith, Elder & Co. 1885–1900.
