= Walter Bagot (priest) =

English cleric and landowner (1731-1806)

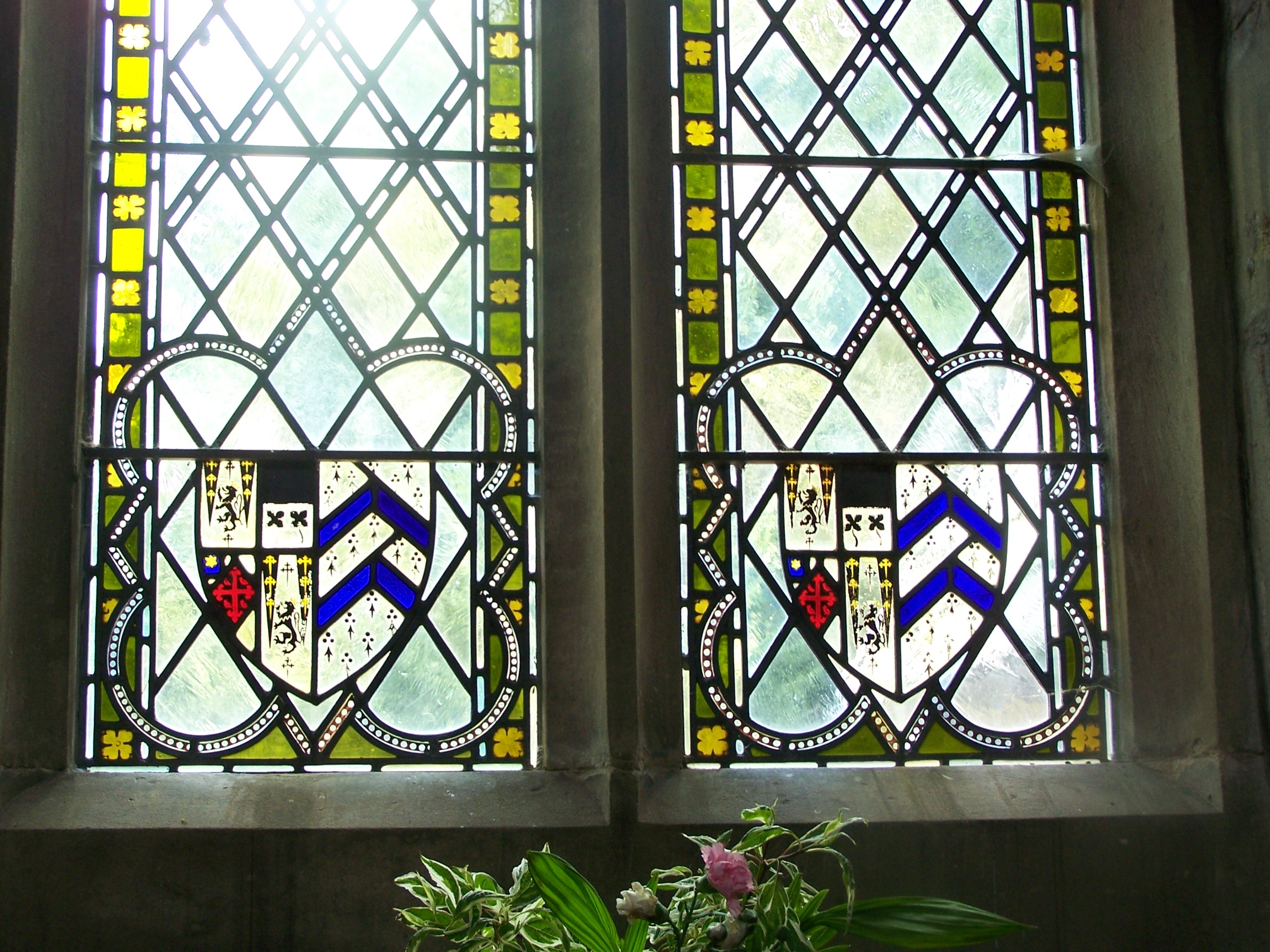
Arms of Levett impaling Bagot, Church of St Leonard, Blithfield, Staffordshire

Walter Bagot (2 November 1731 – 10 July 1806) was an English cleric and landowner. He was the third son of Sir Walter Bagot of Blithfield Hall, Staffordshire.

He was educated at Christ Church, Oxford and graduated Master of Arts in 1757. He was ordained in that year and appointed Rector of Leigh, Staffordshire. In 1759 he was appointed Rector of Blithfield.

He inherited Pype Hayes Hall, which had been in the Bagot family since 1630, on the death of a cousin.

He married twice:

- firstly in 1773 to Anne Swinnerton by whom he had seven children, including his eldest son and heir, Rev. Egerton Bagot, and daughters, Elizabeth (died 5 Mar 1859), who married Dr. Joseph Phillimore, MP, and Louisa-Frances, who married Rev. Richard Levett of Milford Hall, Staffordshire, also an Oxford graduate and a minister.
- secondly to Mary Ward by whom he had another eight children, including a daughter, Jane Margaret, who married the English judge Sir Edward Vaughan Williams in 1826; they were the grandparents of the composer Ralph Vaughan Williams.

== See also ==
- Baron Bagot
