= William Legge, 1st Earl of Dartmouth =

British noble and politician (1672–1750)

The Right Honourable The Earl of Dartmouth PC
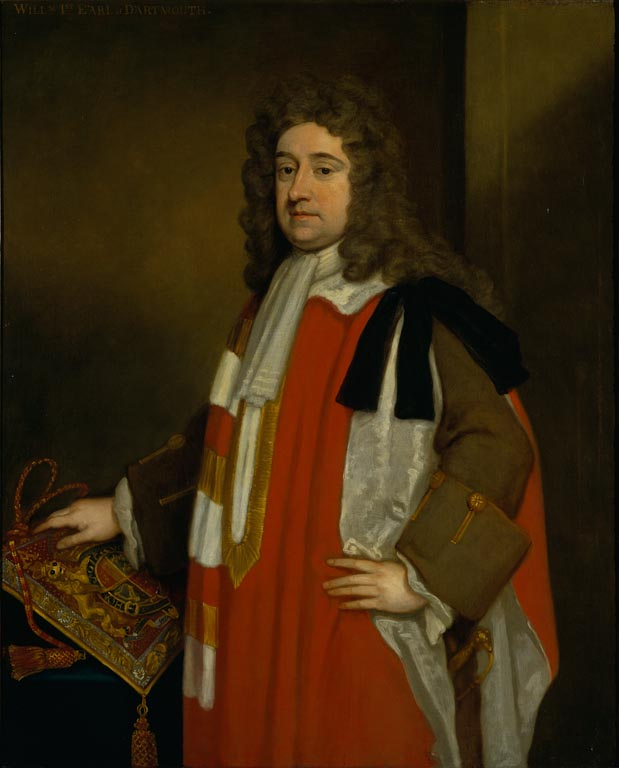

Southern Secretary
- In office 1710–1713
- Preceded by: The Earl of Sunderland
- Succeeded by: The Viscount Bolingbroke

Lord Privy Seal
- In office 1713–1714
- Preceded by: John Robinson
- Succeeded by: The Marquess of Wharton

Personal details
- Born: 14 October 1672
- Died: 15 December 1750 (aged 78)
- Spouse: Anne Finch
- Education: King's College, Cambridge

William Legge, 1st Earl of Dartmouth (14 October 1672 – 15 December 1750), was Lord Privy Seal from 1713 to 1714. He was a Hanoverian Tory, supporting the Hanoverian succession following the death of Queen Anne.

== Life ==
The only son of George Legge, 1st Baron Dartmouth, he was educated as a town-boy at Westminster School. He subsequently went to King's College, Cambridge, where he graduated M.A. in 1689. He succeeded to his father's barony in 1691.

In 1702, he was appointed a member of the Board of Trade and Plantations, and eight years later he became Secretary of State for the Southern Department and joint keeper of the signet for Scotland.

In 1711, he was created Viscount Lewisham and Earl of Dartmouth. In 1713, he exchanged his offices for that of Lord Privy Seal, which he held until the end of 1714. After a long period of retirement from public life he died on 15 December 1750. Dartmouth's eldest son, George Legge, Viscount Lewisham (c. 1703 – 1732), had predeceased him, leaving a son, William. Another son of the first earl was Henry Bilson-Legge, who later served as Chancellor of the Exchequer.

In politics he was a moderate; though himself a Tory, he was prepared to work with the Whigs. He earned the regard of Robert Harley, another believer in moderation; Dartmouth in return remained a loyal friend after Harley's downfall. He also had the confidence of Queen Anne, who praised him as "an honest man." As a Minister, though far from brilliant, he earned a reputation for competence and hard work. He was also noted for discretion; foreign ambassadors complained that it would be easier to get information from a brick wall than from Dartmouth. In his private life, his fondness for laughing at his own jokes led to his nickname "the Jester".

== Marriage and children ==
Lord Dartmouth married Lady Anne Finch, third daughter of Heneage Finch, 1st Earl of Aylesford, in July 1700. They had six children:

- George Legge, Viscount Lewisham (born c. 1704, died 29 August 1732), father of William Legge, 2nd Earl of Dartmouth.
- Lady Barbara Legge (born 1701, died 29 October 1765), married Sir Walter Bagot, 5th Baronet, of Blithfield Hall.
- Hon. Heneage Legge (born 1704, died 29 August 1759)
- Lady Anne Legge (born 1705, died July 1740), married Sir Lister Holte, 5th Baronet, of Aston Hall.
- Rt Hon. Henry Bilson-Legge, PC, FRS (born 29 May 1708, died 23 August 1764), Chancellor of the Exchequer three times between 1754 and 1761.
- Commodore Hon. Edward Legge, FRS (born 1710, died 1747)

Dartmouth was succeeded by his grandson, William, son of his eldest son George Legge, Viscount Lewisham, who died young in 1732.

The Dartmouth family lived at Sandwell Hall (since demolished) in Sandwell Valley.

== Legacy ==
The city of Dartmouth in Nova Scotia, Canada, is named for him.

Political offices
Preceded by The Earl of Sunderland	Secretary of State for the Southern Department; 1710–1713	Succeeded by The Viscount Bolingbroke
Preceded by John Robinson	Lord Privy Seal; 1713–1714	Succeeded by The Marquess of Wharton
Peerage of England
Preceded by George Legge	Baron Dartmouth; 1691–1750	Succeeded by William Legge
Peerage of Great Britain
New creation	Earl of Dartmouth; 1711–1750	Succeeded by William Legge
