= List of reservoirs in Staffordshire =

This is a list of reservoirs in the county of Staffordshire in England with a capacity of more than 25,000m³, based on data from the public register of reservoirs. There are 34 reservoirs above this capacity in Staffordshire, these include two water supply reservoirs, seven canal feeder reservoirs and 25 amenity or ornamental lakes. This list does not include flood storage reservoirs, service reservoirs or ash lagoons.

Relief map of Staffordshire

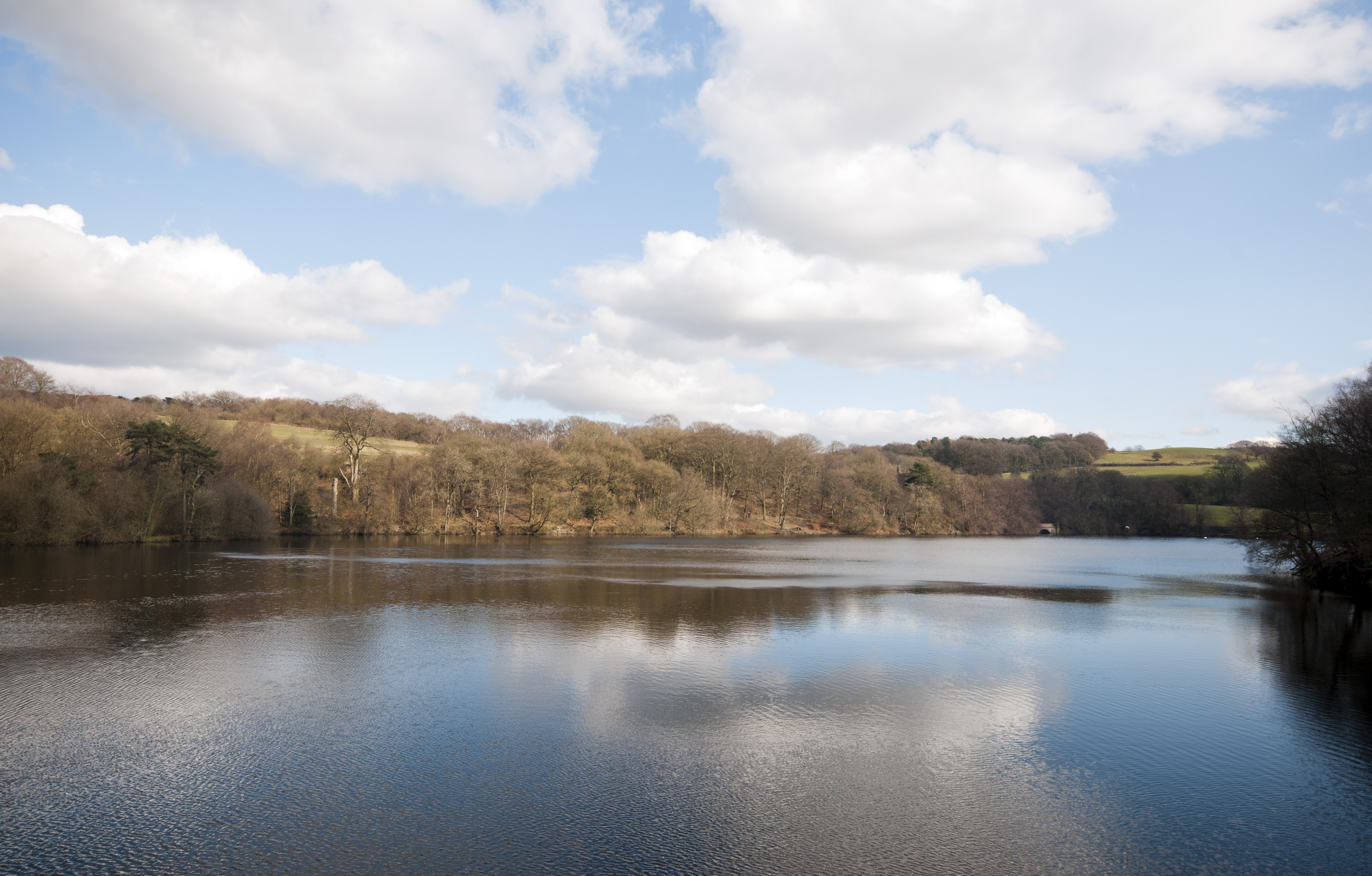
Knypersley Reservoir Biddulph

Rank	Name	Location	Owner	Use	Capacity (m^{3})
1	Blithfield	Blithfield	South Staffordshire Water	Water supply	18,172,000
2	Tittesworth	Leek	Severn Trent	Water supply	6,440,000
3	Chasewater	Burntwood	Staffordshire County Council	Canal feeder	4,400,000
4	Rudyard Lake	Rudyard	Canal & River Trust	Canal feeder	2,950,000
5	Belvide Reservoir	Brewood	Canal & River Trust	Canal Feeder	2,196,000
6	Knypersley Reservoir	Biddulph	Canal & River Trust	Canal Feeder	930,000
7	Gailey Lower Reservoir	Cannock	Canal & River Trust	Canal Feeder	778,000
8	Patshull Great Pool	Pattingham	Private	Amenity	700,000
9	Stanley Pool	Bagnall	Canal & River Trust	Amenity	610,980
10	Chillington Pool	Codsall	Private	Ornamental Lake	450,000
11	Gailey Upper Reservoir	Cannock	Canal & River Trust	Canal Feeder	355,000
12	Trentham Gardens Lake	Trentham	Private	Ornamental Lake	220,000
13	Stowe Pool	Lichfield	Lichfield District Council	Amenity	217,600
14	Calf Heath Reservoir	Cannock	Canal & River Trust	Canal Feeder	166,000
15	Brookleys Lake	Alton	Private	Amenity	150,000
16	Patshull Church Pool	Pattingham	Private	Amenity	122,000
17	Rugeley Amenity Lake	Rugeley	Rugeley Power Station Ltd	Amenity	121,000
18	Himley Great Pool	Himley	Dudley Metropolitan Borough Council	Amenity	96,400
19	Bathpool Park Lake	Newcastle-under-Lyme	Newcastle-under-Lyme Borough Council	Amenity	95,550
20	Black Lake	Hanchurch	Private	Amenity	95,000
21	Gap Pool	Ranton	Private	Amenity	95,000
22	Holly Bush Lake	Burton upon Trent	Private	Amenity	85,000
23	Mill Green Lake	Cannock	Private	Amenity	76,000
24	Canwell Estate Reservoir	Canwell	Private	Ornamental Lake	70,000
25	Swinfen Lake	Swinfen	Private	Amenity	68,800
26	Betley Hall Pool	Betley	Private	Ornamental Lake	64,467
27	Springslade Pool	Penkridge	Private	Amenity	62,375
28	Bromley Pool	Loggerheads	Private	Amenity	45,000
29	Tixall Park Pool	Tixall	Private	Amenity	37,600
30	Pool Hall Reservoir	Lower Penn	Private	Amenity	35,000
31	Hales Hall Pool	Cheadle	Private	Ornamental Lake	34,173
32	Minster Pool	Lichfield	Lichfield District Council	Ornamental Lake	28,000
33	Lodgerail Pool	Penkridge	Private	Amenity	27,500
34	Dimmingsdale Pool	Lower Penn	Canal & River Trust	Canal Feeder	27,110
