= Gailey =

Gailey may refer to:

- Gailey, Staffordshire, England
  - Gailey Reservoirs
  - Gailey railway station
- Gailey (surname), people with the surname Gailey
- Fred Gailey, Kris Kringle's attorney in the movie Miracle on 34th Street
