= Blithfield =

Civil parish in Staffordshire, England

Coordinates: 52.8129°N 1.9347°W

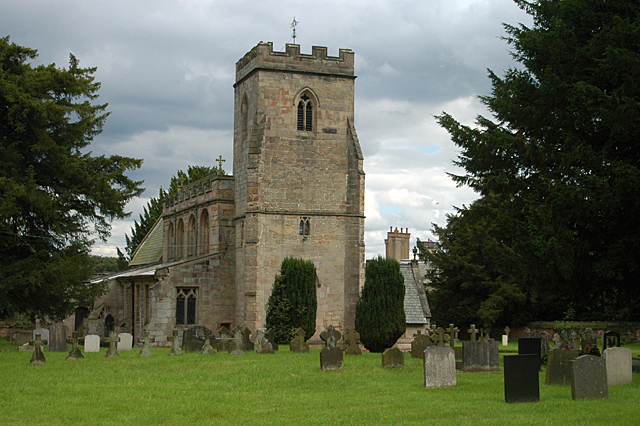
- St Leonard's Church, Blithfield

- Location within Staffordshire
- Population: 230 (2011)
- OS grid reference: SK044239
- Civil parish: Blithfield
- District: East Staffordshire
- Shire county: Staffordshire
- Region: West Midlands
- Country: England
- Sovereign state: United Kingdom
- Post town: Rugeley
- Postcode district: WS15
- Dialling code: 01283
- Police: Staffordshire
- Fire: Staffordshire
- Ambulance: West Midlands
- UK Parliament: Lichfield

Blithfield is a civil parish in the East Staffordshire district of Staffordshire, England. It includes the settlements of Admaston (a small hamlet in Staffordshire), Newton along with Blithfield Hall, home of the Bagot family since 1360. It is situated 7.5 miles (12.1 km) south-west of Uttoxeter and 5.3 miles (8.5 km) north of Rugeley. Blithfield and Admaston comprise 1,414 acres (572 ha) of land, with Newton occupying 1,744 acres (706 ha). The nearest railway stations are Rugeley Trent Valley 4.5 miles (7.2 km) and Rugeley Town 6.0 miles (9.7 km).

== History ==
A parish like Blithfield is normally formed around a small settlement. Blithfield used to be centered around the Parish Church. At the end of the 1800s Church and State divided and this area is now represented as "a local authority by the Blithfield Parish Council and the Church of England by the Parochial Church Council". The population in Blithfield decreased from 439 people in 1801 to 262 people in 1961. According to the 2001 census it has a population of 225, situated within 96 households. The number of houses has stayed relatively stable since 1830, fluctuating from 81 houses in 1830, dropping to 65 in 1920 and then steadily increasing until 2001. One hundred and seventy-three of the 225 people in 2001 were between the ages of 16 and 74. Blithfield Reservoir takes up much of the parish and the area is home to the Bagot goat.

=== Etymology ===
The first part of the name "Blithfield" is simply an alternative spelling of the word "Blythe", which originates from Old English word "blitha" meaning 'gentle'. The second part stems from the Old English "feld", which meant 'open or accessible land'. However, by the time Blithfield became its name, it might "just as well be interpreted in the modern sense of 'field'".

=== Domesday Book ===
Domesday Book, commissioned by William the Conqueror, is a land survey, which was completed in 1086. Its purpose was to assess the extent of the land and of resources owned in England, and the amount of the taxes that could be raised at the time.

Blithfield in 1086
County	Staffordshire
Total population	13 households
Total tax assessed	1 Geld units (Very small)
Taxable units	Taxable value- 1 Geld units
Value	Value to Lord in 1086- £1
Households	7 villagers, 1 smallholder, 4 slaves, 1 priest.
Lord in 1066	Edmund
Lord in 1086	Roger of Lacy

== Church ==
St Leonard's Church dates from the 13th century, it is set away from the modern village of Admaston, and lies just west of the modern Blithfield Hall. The church was built between the 13th and 19th centuries. In the late 13th and early 14th centuries, four "bay arcades" were built. The base of the western tower and the windows were constructed in the 14th century, and the "clerestory above the nave" was added in the 15th century. The upper part of the tower, with stained glass in the west window is thought to date back to 1525. The rest of the church dates to the 19th century. The remains of a 13th- or 14th-century cross can still be seen in the churchyard. The church contains tombs of the Bagot family as well as an original helmet, ancient stained glass windows and a floor paved in Minton tiles. Parish registers of the church begin in 1538. The churchyard contains a war grave of a Royal Flying Corps officer of World War I.

== Medieval Blithfield ==
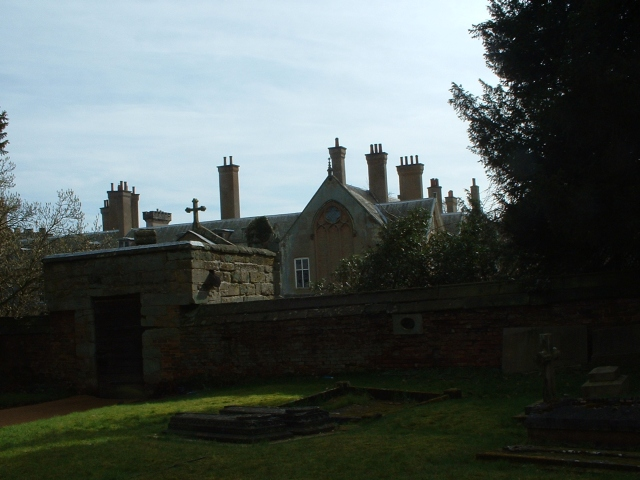
Blithfield Hall, dating between 1740 and 1822

The "late-Saxon" settlement of Blithfield, which appears in Domesday Book did not last, and the last documented evidence of the village was in 1334. This site of the original village is now defined as a "Deserted Medieval Village (DMV)" with hardly any visible remnants. However, the site is strongly thought to have been located within the grounds of Blithfield Hall. The original mansion of Blithfield Hall, was built with a moat in the 1390s by Sir John Bagot. It is thought, however, that the Lord of Blithfield was unhappy with some of the work done on the hall, so in 1398 the carpenter, Robert Stanlowe, was sued. The present hall is now largely 16th century, with additions of c. 1740 and of the later 18th century, and is Grade I listed.

== Modern Blithfield ==
=== Blithfield reservoir ===
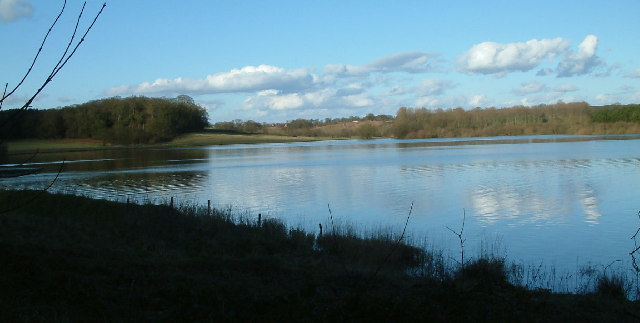
Blithfield Reservoir, opened in 1953 by Queen Elizabeth The Queen Mother

Blithfield Reservoir is the most apparent modern construction. It was opened by Queen Elizabeth The Queen Mother in October 1953 after six years of building. The project was proposed by the "South Staffordshire Water PLC" who, during the 1930s and 1940s purchased 2,350 acres (950 ha) of land in the Blythe Valley, to put into action their plan, much of this land (1,585 acres [641 ha]) was bought from Lord Bagot, the owner of Blithfield Hall. The reservoir itself covers a smaller area of land, approximately 790 acres (320 ha). Ownership of the farmland bordering the reservoir allowed control over farming methods and thus minimised any risk of water pollution. It was originally planned to start building the reservoir in 1939, but this was postponed until 1947, due to the onset of World War II. A bridge, now carrying the B5013 road, separates the water of the reservoir into two unequal parts, the shallower section is used mainly for fishing and the deeper section, close to the dam, is for the sailing boats. Before the Blithfield Reservoir was built, the land consisted mostly of fields with small areas of woodland. The land was predominantly used by farmers for rearing animals and growing crops.

=== South Staffordshire Water PLC ===
The South Staffordshire Water PLC have granted a lease to the West Midland Bird Club for the purpose of observing and recording birds. It is one of the most important sites for wetland birds in the Midlands. The site was first opened in the 1970s and this continues, ensuring that the changes in the birdlife of the site are able to be observed and recorded.

== See also ==
- Listed buildings in Blithfield
