= Robert Gailey =

Robert Gailey may refer to:

- Robert Gailey (American football) (1869–1950), American college football player and coach
- Robert S. Gailey (born 1957), American physical therapist and professor

== See also ==
- Robert Galley (1921–2012), French politician and member of the Free French Forces
