= Admaston =

Admaston may refer to:

- Admaston, Ontario, Canada
- Admaston Bromley, Ontario, Canada
- Admaston, Shropshire, England, UK
- Admaston, Staffordshire, England, UK
