= Gailey (surname) =

Gailey is a surname. Notable people with the name include:

- Chan Gailey (born 1952), American football player and coach
- David Gailey (1807–1881), Australian pioneer
- Doug Gailey (died 2007), New Zealand rugby league player
- Francis Gailey (1882–1972), Australian-born American competition swimmer
- Jeannine Hall Gailey (born 1973), American poet
- Mike Gailey (born 1970), American soccer player
- Richard Gailey (1834–1924), Irish-born Australian architect
- Robert Gailey (American football) (1869–1950), American college football player and coach
- Robert S. Gailey (born 1957), American physical therapist and professor
- Sarah Gailey, American author

== See also ==
- Gailey (disambiguation)
