= Minster Pool =

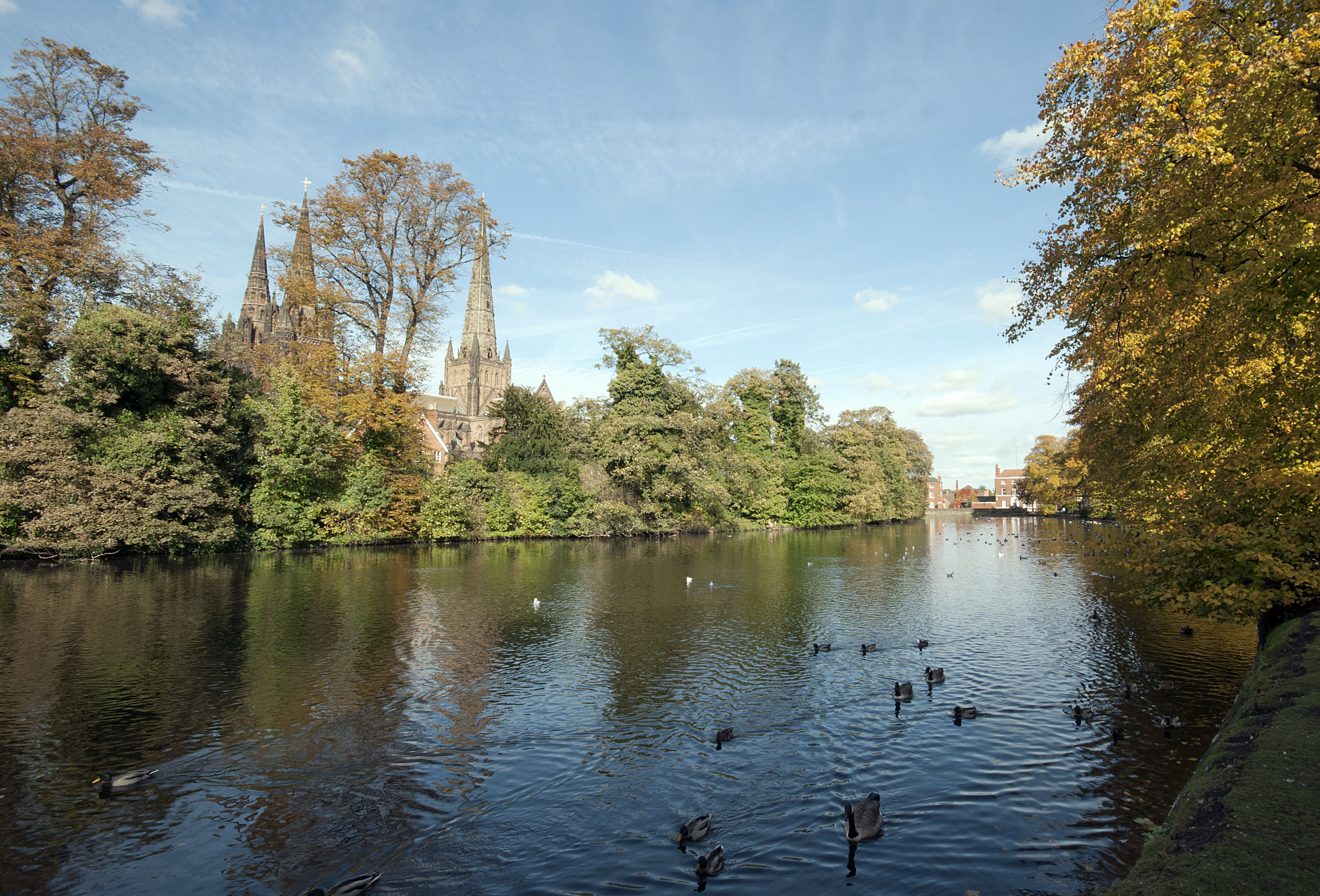

- Location within Staffordshire
- Location: Lichfield, Staffordshire
- Coordinates: 52.684293°N 1.829972°W
- Type: reservoir
- Primary inflows: Leamonsley Brook, Trunkfield Brook
- Primary outflows: Leamonsley Brook, Trunkfield Brook to Stowe Pool
- Built: 11th Century
- Max. length: 220 metres (720 ft)
- Max. width: 50 metres (160 ft)
- Surface area: 8,700 square metres (2.1 acres)
- Average depth: 3.2 metres (10 ft)
- Water volume: 28,000 cubic metres (23 acre⋅ft; 6.2×10^{6} imp gal)
- Shore length^{1}: 520 metres (1,710 ft)
- ^{1} Shore length is not a well-defined measure.

Minster Pool is a reservoir located between Bird Street and Dam Street in the heart of the city of Lichfield, Staffordshire in the United Kingdom. The pool lies directly south of Lichfield Cathedral and historically has been important to the defence of the Cathedral Close. The pool was originally formed in the 11th century when a boggy stream was dammed at its eastern end to drive a mill on Dam Street. The pool was used as a mill pond and fishery until 1856 when the mill was demolished; it has since been retained for public amenity.

== Hydrology ==
Lichfield is built on two sides of a shallow valley into which flow Leamonsley Brook and Trunkfield Brook from the west. Leamonsley Brook originates from a spring in Maple Hayes and flows east through Beacon Park where it combines with Trunkfield Brook into a conduit under the Museum Gardens. The streams are then carried under Bird Street into Minster Pool. Minster Pool is created by the construction of an earth embankment dam built at its eastern end on Dam Street. The pool outflows into a pipe under Dam Street, Stowe Fields and into Stowe Pool. The pool has a capacity of 28,000m³ (6.5 million gallons) and a surface area of 8,700m² (2.1 acres) with an average depth of 3.2 m (10 ft).

== History ==
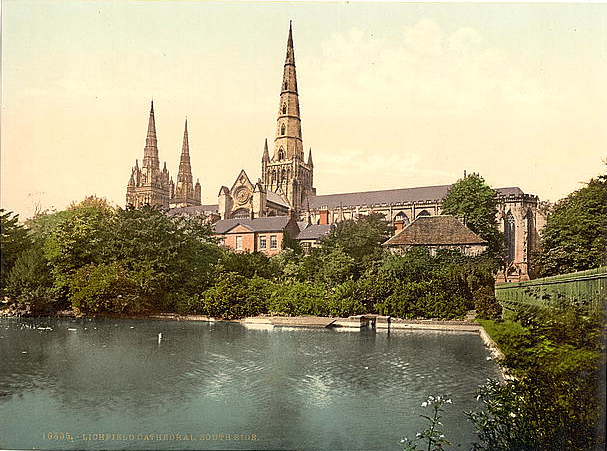
Minster Pool c.1890

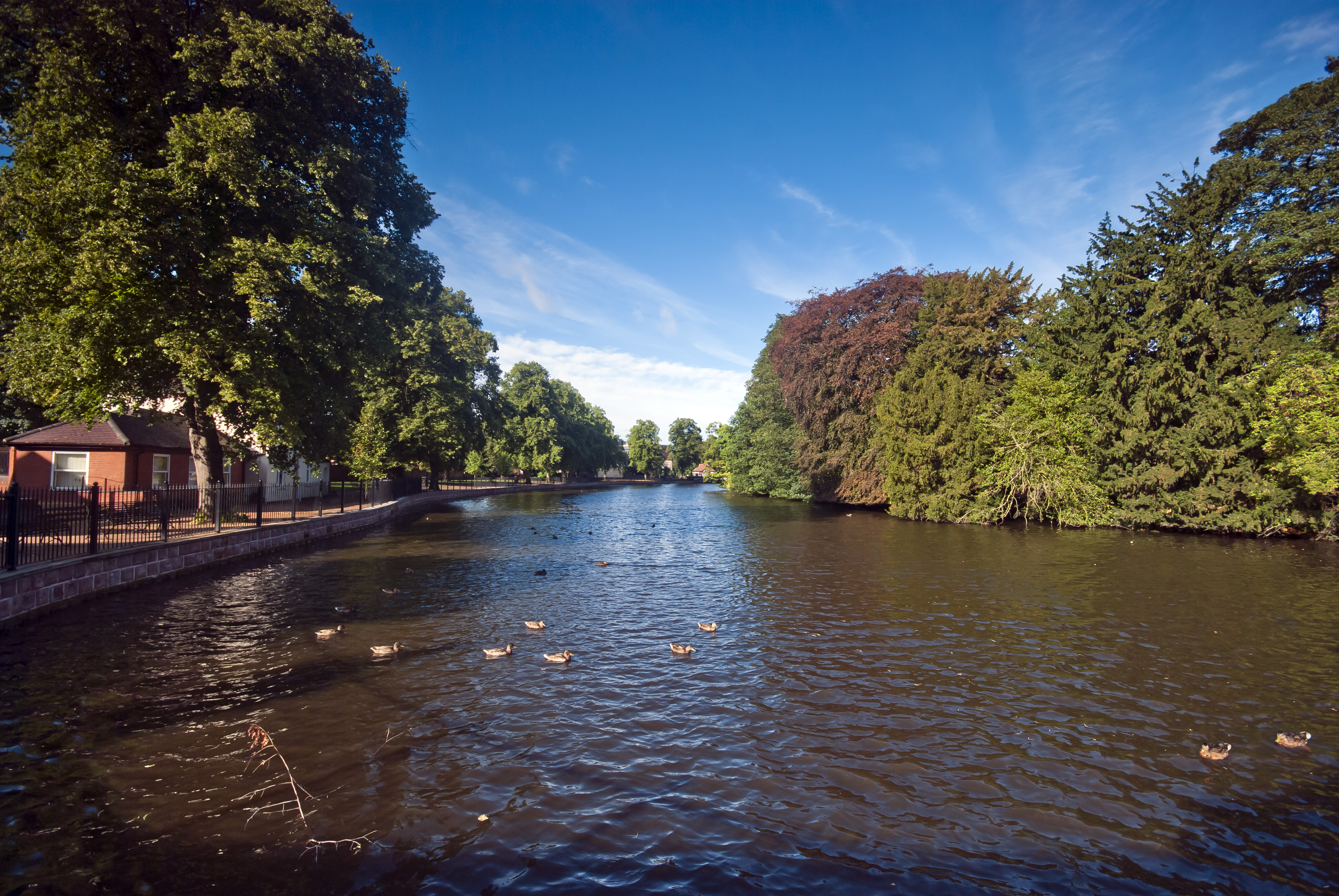
View from Dam Street

It was originally thought that Minster Pool was created in 1310 when, under the orders of Bishop Langton, causeways were built on Bird Street and Dam Street to connect the Cathedral close to the town. However, after dredging works in the 19th century engineers discovered strata of red and white sandstone, which may indicate that the pool formed in the cavity created from quarrying of the sandstone to build the Norman Cathedral in around 1085. According to the Domesday Book, the Bishop had two mills in 1086, one of these is likely to have been on Dam Street and would have involved construction of the dam which would have formed Minster Pool. In 1310 Bishop Langton built a causeway on Bird Street splitting a much larger pool into two, these became known as Bishops Fish Pool on the west and Minster Pool on the east. At this time Langton paved the streets and improved the fortifications to the Close with high stone walls and towers built on the north bank of the pool. Langton is thought to have improved and enlarged the dam at the east end of the pool at this time. The south entrance to the Close was located at the east end of Minster Pool on Dam Street and consisted of a portcullis and drawbridge. The pool proved to be a significant defence during the siege of the cathedral during the Civil War of 1643–46.

The mill on Dam Street was known as Castle mill in the 14th and 15th centuries. In early 14th the mill ground malt only, in 1670 it consisted of a corn mill and a malt mill. It was described as a corn mill in 1696 and in 1716 it had been converted into an oil mill. By 1731 it was a wheat, rye and malt mill and remained in use as corn mill until 1856 when it was demolished by South Staffordshire Waterworks Co.

The slow flowing nature of the streams caused a lot of siltation in the pool, this combined with it being used as a sewer for the Close caused it to become dirty. In 1772 the pool was cleaned and landscaped by the corporation. Poet Anna Seward was instrumental in landscaping the pool into a serpentine shape and developing a 'New Walk' along its southern bank. By the mid 19th century it had become dirty again and five feet of mud was dredged in 1855. During these works cannonballs and shells from the Civil War were found in the mud.

In 1816-17 Bishop Langton's 14th-century bridge on Bird Street was replaced with the current bridge. The 14th-century bridge was very narrow and could not take coaches across it, causing them to be diverted around Stowe Pool and back onto Beacon Street. The new bridge designed by Joseph Potter, was built of ashlar stone and comprises 3 elliptical arches, a low parapet and iron railings with two pylons surmounted by lamp irons. Parts of Bishop Langtons original Causeway were left below the new bridge. This new bridge could now carry the main road from London to Chester. Causeway bridge is now a Grade II listed building. In 1857 the South Staffordshire Waterworks Co. proposed to fill in the pool and replace it with a public gardens. This was proposed, as it was undesirable to have an open area of water in the middle of a city, which would be used for domestic supply. This proposal was very unpopular among the citizens and the proposal was amended to retain the pool. Instead a cast-iron pipe supported by brick piers was laid along the bed of the pool extending under Dam Street and into Stowe Pool. The pipe would carry water from Leamonsley and Trunkfield Brooks through the Museum Gardens in Beacon Park, under Bird Street through Minster Pool and into Stowe Pool. When water was being conveyed in the opposite direction from Stowe Pool to Sandfields Pumping Station the outflow of the brooks would be turned into Minster Pool from where it would outflow into Stowe Pool.

South Staffordshire Waterworks Co. passed ownership of the pool back to Lichfield District Council in 1968 when the water supply from Stowe Pool was no longer needed. The pool remains an important public amenity to the city and memorial gardens have been laid out on both sides of the pool. The Garden of Remembrance was laid out on the north bank in 1920 to commemorate World War I and the small memorial gardens that lie alongside Minster Walk were opened in 1955 in memory of Lichfield citizens that lost their lives in World War II.

In 2010, with funding from the Heritage Lottery Fund and Big Lottery Fund the pool underwent restoration works. Works were completed in July 2011 and included dredging the pool, reinforcing the pool's bank with local red sandstone, installing new railings, seats and benches, and creating a new Speakers' Corner adjacent to Dam Street. New trees were also added to the ancient avenue of limes and up-lighters were installed at the base of the trees, creating a beautiful night time vista.

== Lists ==
- List of reservoirs in Staffordshire
- List of reservoirs and dams in the United Kingdom
- List of lakes of England
