= Stowe Pool =

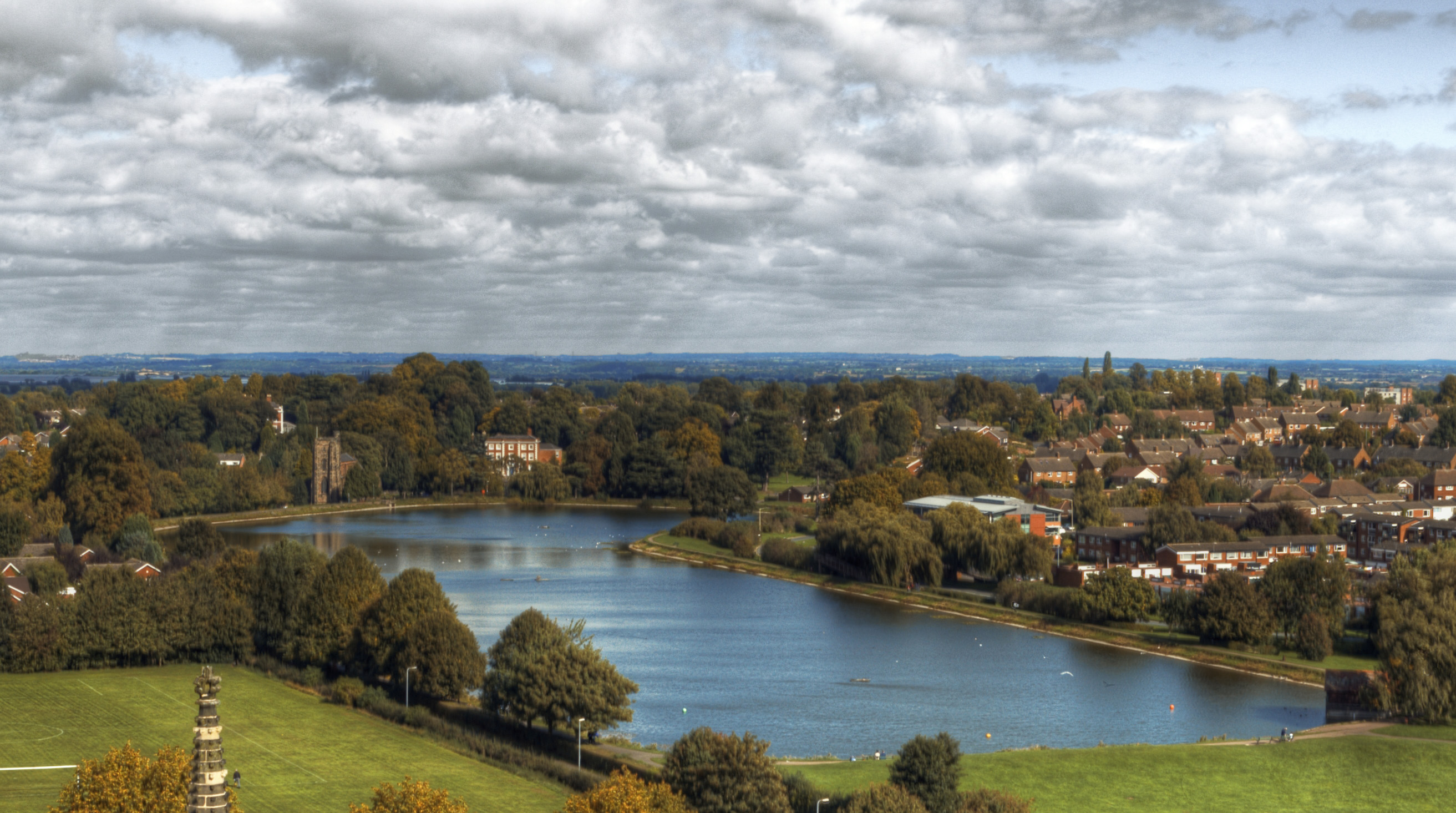

- Location within Staffordshire
- Location: Lichfield, Staffordshire
- Coordinates: 52.688384°N 1.822799°W
- Type: reservoir
- Primary inflows: Leamonsley Brook, Trunkfield Brook from Minster Pool
- Primary outflows: Curborough Brook
- Catchment area: 37.2 km^{2} (14.4 sq mi)
- Basin countries: England
- Managing agency: Lichfield District Council
- Built: 1856
- Max. length: 470 metres (1,540 ft)
- Max. width: 100 metres (330 ft)
- Surface area: 55,000 square metres (14 acres)
- Average depth: 3.95 metres (13.0 ft)
- Max. depth: 7 metres (23 ft)
- Water volume: 217,600 m^{3} (47.9×10^{6} imp gal; 176.4 acre⋅ft)
- Shore length^{1}: 1.13 kilometres (0.70 mi)
- Surface elevation: 79.3 m (260 ft) OD
- ^{1} Shore length is not a well-defined measure.

Stowe Pool is a reservoir located in the city of Lichfield, Staffordshire. Formerly a fishery (along with nearby Bishop's Pool (now filled in) and Minster Pool), Stowe Pool was turned into a reservoir in 1856 by the South Staffordshire Waterworks Co. Before 1856, Stowe Pool existed as a mill pond, with Stowe mill located just to the west of St Chad's Church. Since 1968 the reservoir has not been used for supply and is now a public amenity used for recreation purposes. Stowe Pool is a designated SSSI site as it is home to the native white-clawed crayfish.

== Hydrology ==
Lichfield is built on two sides of a shallow valley into which flow Leamonsley Brook and Trunkfield Brook from the west. Leamonsley Brook originates from a spring in Maple Hayes and flows east through Beacon Park where it combines with Trunkfield Brook into a conduit under the Museum Gardens. The streams are then carried under Bird Street into Minster Pool and then pass into a pipe under Dam Street, Stowe Fields and into Stowe Pool. The outflow from Stowe Pool flows north as Curborough Brook, eventually flowing into the River Trent. Stowe Pool has a capacity of 217,600m^{3} (47.8 million gallons) and a surface area of 55,000m^{2} (14 acres), with an average depth of 3.95m.

== Natural history ==
The pool supports a large variety of fish including, carp, bream, tench, roach, perch, pike and eel. Stowe Pool also supports a large and healthy population of white-clawed crayfish. Due to the isolated nature of Stowe Pool the crayfish are not exposed to disease which has spread into many of their other habitats. As a result of its crayfish population Stowe Pool was designated a SSSI site in 1998. Effective wildlife management of the pool has attracted various species of wildfowl, including mute swans, moorhens, coots and grebes.

Stowe Pool has limited marginal vegetation, but its water plants include Polygonum amphibium and spiked water-milfoil. The shallow margins of the pool are dominated by extensive low-growing blankets of the water plant Chara aspera var. curta a nationally scarce stonewort.

== History ==
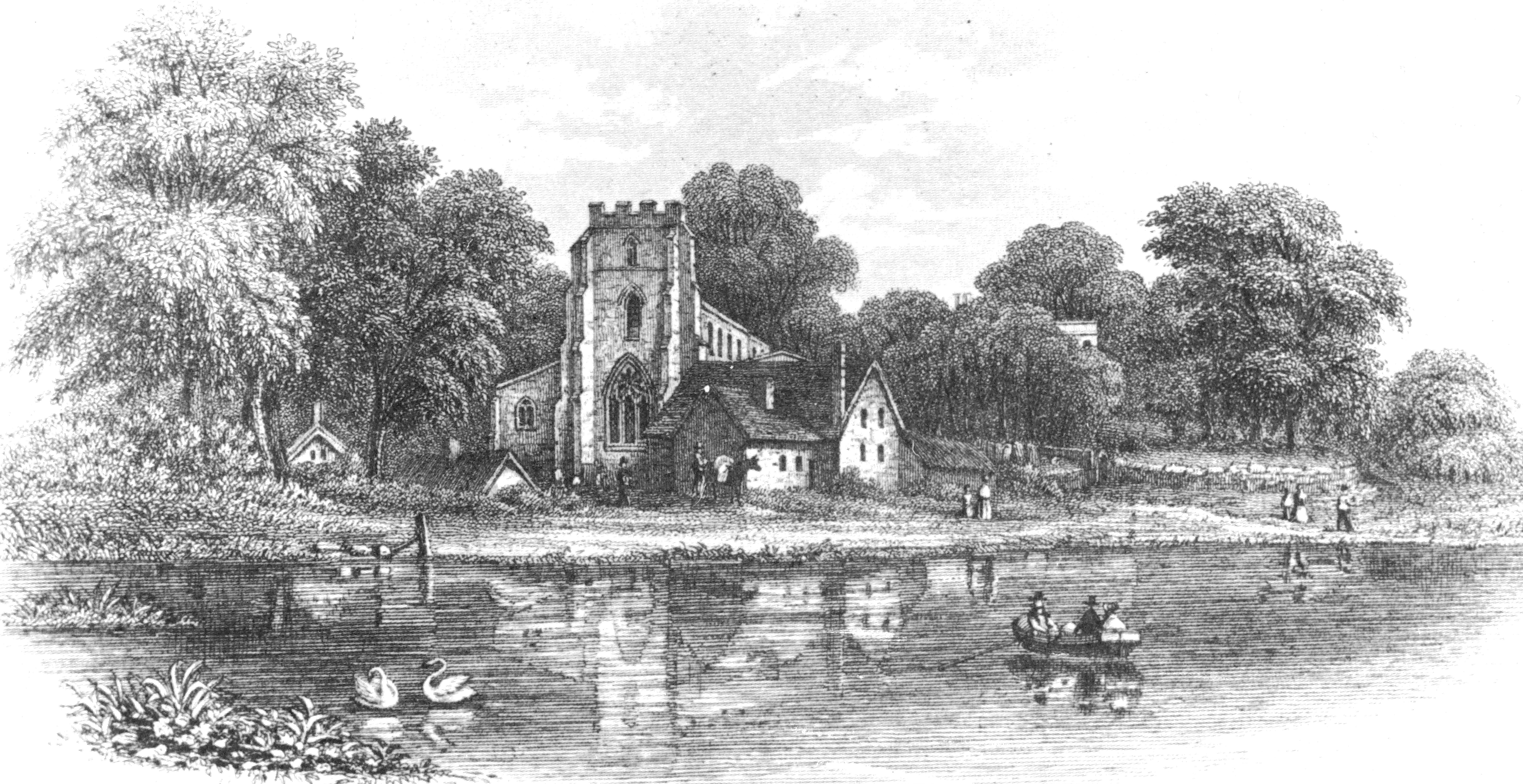
Stowe mill which stood at the east of the pool until 1856

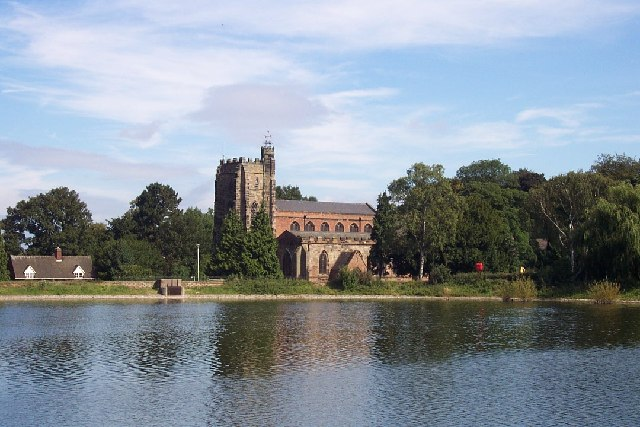
St Chad's Church from Stowe Pool

Stowe Pool was originally formed in the 11th century when a dam and mill were constructed across Leamonsley Brook near to St Chads Church. The original mill was under the ownership of the Bishop of Lichfield and provided him with an important income from the city. The mill ground wheat and mixed corn from the 14th until its demolition in 1856. During this time the mill had been rebuilt and added to many times and during the 18th century it consisted of three water wheels and an adjoining smithy capable of iron manufacture, although it may never have been used for such a purpose.

The pool was an important fishery in the 13th century under the ownership of the Bishop of Lichfield. The ownership of the pool passed to the city in the 16th century who then let the fishery to the public until 1856.

In the 18th century the pool was frequently visited by Samuel Johnson, whose father had a parchment factory (today commemorated by the street name 'The Parchments') on the north side of the pool. Nearby stood an enormous willow tree, which became famous for its great size; it was much admired by Johnson, who visited it whenever he returned to Lichfield. Because of Johnson's interest in the tree, it became known as 'Johnson's Willow'; the current tree on the site is a descendant of the original.

By the 19th century due to the slow flowing nature of the streams Stowe Pool silted up and only existed at its eastern end. The western portion was a bog known as ‘the moggs’. As Leamonsley Brook flowed out of the mill on Dam Street along Reeve Lane it split into two streams running east towards the mill at St Chad's. As the stream flowed out of the mill as Curborough Brook it split into two streams encircling St Chad's Church and joining on the other side. During this time the pool was used as a sewer and discharge from local tanneries flowed into the waters. In the 1840s the health hazard posed by the pool brought a proposal for it to be filled in.

In 1853 the South Staffordshire Waterworks Co. was founded and it was immediately proposed by John Robinson McClean to tap Lichfield's plentiful water resources to supply the Black Country. In 1856 the mill was demolished, the silt was dredged and an embankment built around the pool to raise the water level bringing it up to its current size. A promenade was built on top of the embankment around the perimeter of the pool. Pipes were laid from the streams by the Museum Gardens, under Bird Street into Minster Pool then under Dam Street and Stowe Fields into Stowe Pool. The stored water in Stowe Pool could then be conveyed back towards Sandfields Pumping Station, where it was piped along the railway line to Walsall.

Ownership of the pool was handed back to the city in 1968 when the reservoir was no longer needed for supply. Lichfield District Council have retained the pool for public amenity and stocked the pool with fish for local anglers.

== Lists ==
- List of reservoirs in Staffordshire
- List of reservoirs and dams in the United Kingdom
- List of Sites of Special Scientific Interest in Staffordshire
- List of lakes of England
