= Fens Reservoir =

Proposed reservoir in Cambridgeshire, England

Coordinates: 52.477°N 0.070°E

The Fens Reservoir is a proposed water reservoir to be constructed to the north of Chatteris to supply the growing population around Cambridge. It is a joint venture between Cambridge Water Company and Anglian Water, and is designated as a nationally significant infrastructure project. It is set to be completed by 2036.
