= Tittesworth reservoir =

Reservoir in Staffordshire, England

Tittesworth Reservoir
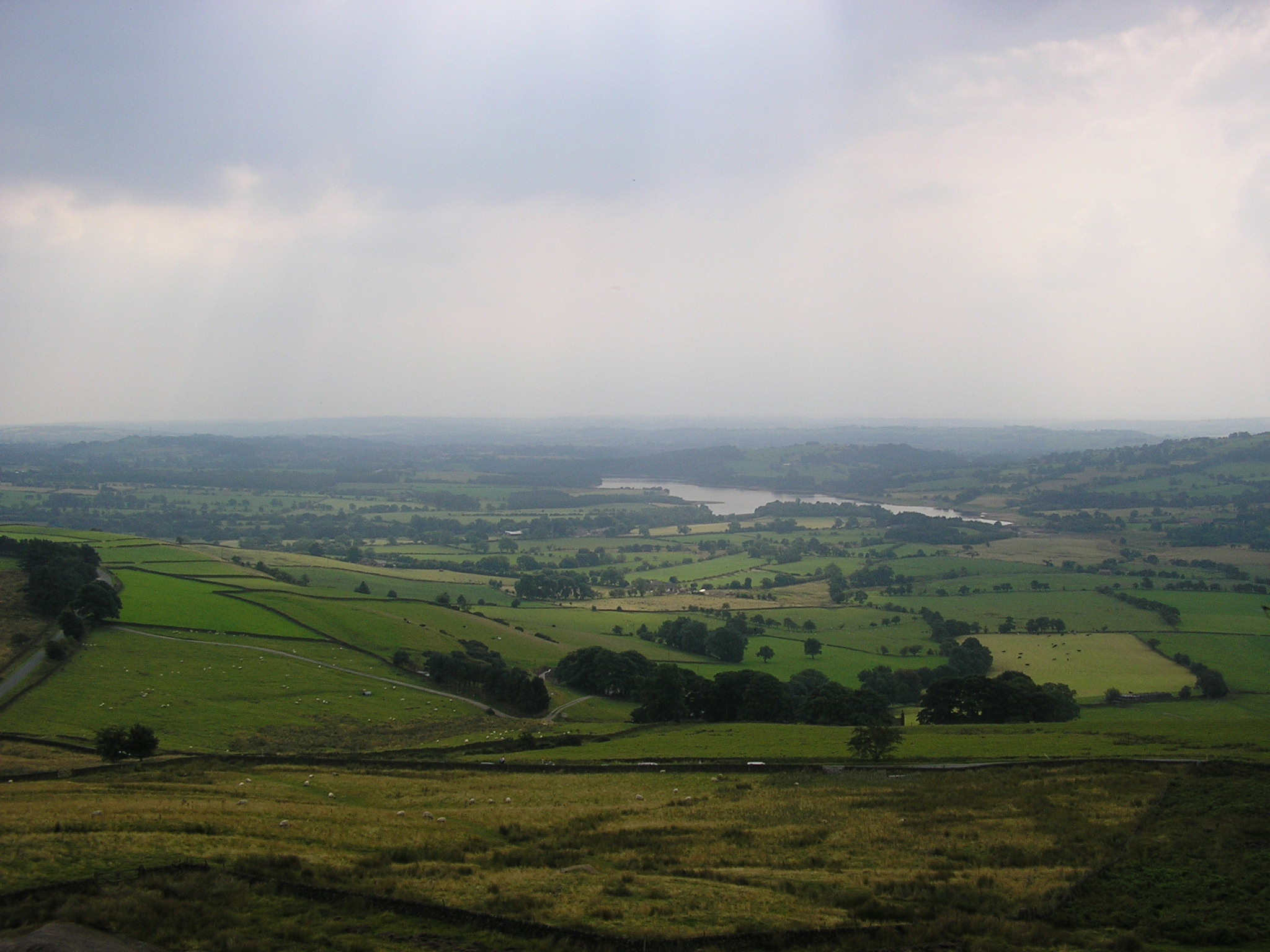

- Location within Staffordshire
- Location: Staffordshire
- Coordinates: 53.134°N 2.013°W
- Lake type: reservoir
- Primary inflows: River Churnet
- Primary outflows: River Churnet
- Managing agency: Severn Trent Water
- Built: 1963
- Max. length: 1.8 kilometres (1.1 miles)
- Max. width: 0.6 kilometres (0.37 miles)
- Surface area: 760,000 square metres (190 acres)
- Water volume: 6,440,000m³ (1.4 billion gallons)
- Shore length^{1}: 6.6 kilometres (4.1 miles)
- ^{1} Shore length is not a well-defined measure.

Tittesworth Reservoir is a water storage reservoir near Leek, Staffordshire, England, fed by the River Churnet. The reservoir and associated water treatment works are owned and operated by Severn Trent Water.

== History ==
The reservoir was built by the Staffordshire Potteries Waterworks Company in 1858, as a compensation reservoir to regulate the flow of water in the River Churnet, which was used by several mills downstream. This was required by the Staffordshire Potteries Waterworks Consolidation and Extension Act 1853 (16 & 17 Vict. cxcviii). Supply water was extracted, naturally filtered, from underground sources, not from the river or reservoir.

On 1 January 1925, the reservoir, together with the rest of the undertakings of the private Staffordshire Potteries Waterworks Company passed to the new, public, Staffordshire Potteries Water Board.

The reservoir was extended by the Staffordshire Potteries Water Board, under powers in the Staffordshire Potteries Water Board Act 1949 (12, 13 & 14 Geo. 6. c. xl). Although authorised in 1949, the decision to proceed with the extension was only made in 1957. Work started in May 1959 and was completed in 1963. Nine properties in the village of Meerbrook were flooded by the extended reservoir, including The Fountain Inn.

A water treatment plant was built immediately below the reservoir, with the treated water being stored in a 10-million gallon underground reservoir at the site, before being distributed to other service reservoirs at Birches Head and Bucknall. An effluent treatment plant was also constructed below the dam, to treat the effluent from the William Tatton dying works of at Upper Hulme Mill, which were piped around the reservoir.

The Staffordshire Potteries Water Board, and with it Tittesworth Reservoir, became part of the new Severn Trent Water Authority in 1974.

== Reservoir ==
Tittesworth is the second largest reservoir by volume in the county of Staffordshire. The Peak District Boundary Walk runs past the reservoir.
