= Sandfields Pumping Station =

Disused pumping station in Lichfield, in Staffordshire, England

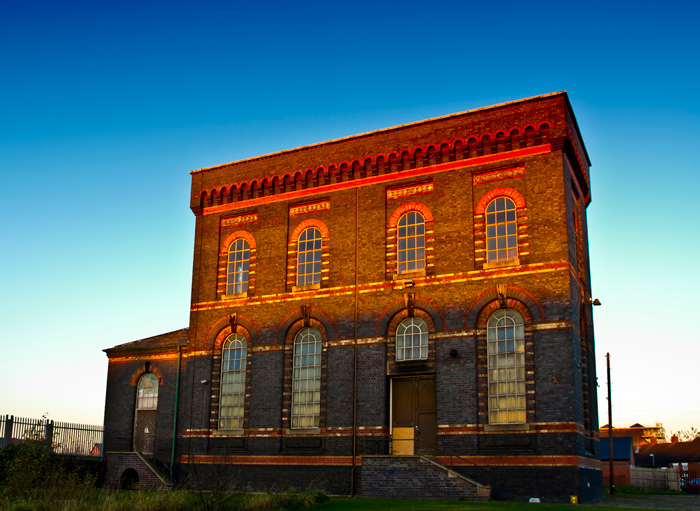
- Interactive map of the Sandfields Pumping Station area

General information
- Location: Lichfield, Staffordshire, Chesterfield Road, United Kingdom
- Coordinates: 52°40′24.744″N 1°50′5.417″W grid reference SK 11265 08440
- Completed: 1873

Website
- lichfieldwaterworkstrust.co.uk

Listed Building – Grade II*
- Official name: Engine House at Sandfields Pumping Station
- Designated: 6 March 1970
- Reference no.: 1187742

Sandfields Pumping Station is a unique pumping station in Lichfield, in Staffordshire, England. It is a thriving community space and an enbryonic museum. The engine house was built in 1873 and contains the original Cornish beam engine installed at that time. It is a Grade II* listed building.

== History ==
The South Staffordshire Waterworks Company, founded by John Robinson McClean, with fellow directors of the South Staffordshire Railway and other local businessmen, was formed by an Act of Parliament in 1853. Its purpose was to supply water to towns in the Black Country, an industrial area where local wells were often polluted, and where there had been cholera epidemics in 1832 and 1849. The sources used by the new company were springs and streams in the vicinity of Lichfield. Minster Pool and Stowe Pool were used as reservoirs, linked to a new pumping station by a three-quarter-mile rock-cut tunnel.

The original engine house, designed by the architect Edward Adams, was opened in 1858 by William Ward, 1st Earl of Dudley. It housed two, later three, single-engined rotative beam engines supplied by the Soho Foundry of James Watt and Co. They were originally intended for the withdrawn atmospheric railway project of the South Devon Railway Company.

William Vawdry, the engineer of the water company, recommended in 1871 that an additional engine should be installed. The present building was erected in 1872–73 by the Birmingham architect Henry Naden. It housed a Cornish beam engine; its suppliers, J. and G. Davies of the Albion Foundry, Tipton, were declared bankrupt before the engine was complete, and it was completed and installed under Vawdry's direction in late 1873.

The three rotative beam engines were replaced in 1923 by two horizontal uniflow steam engines built by Sulzer, for a filtration plant that opened in 1927. The original engine house of 1858, adjacent to the later building, was demolished in 1966, and a new building was erected.

Abstraction of water ended in 1997 and the puming station closed; the filtration plant was demolished in 1998.

== Description ==
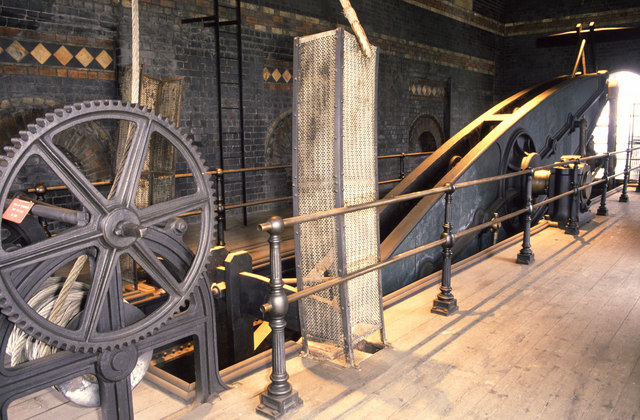
The beam of the Cornish engine

The 1870s building is described in the listing text as in a "free Italianate style". It is rectangular, with two storeys over a basement, and four bays on the south-west side. It is in blue brick with dressings in red and yellow brick, stone sills, polychromatic bands, and a polychromatic frieze on the upper floor, above which there is a stone-coped parapet with decorative machicolations, and a slate roof. The 1960s building, built over the basement of the original engine house, is attached to the rear.

The Cornish beam engine within the 1870s building has a cylinder of diameter 65 inches (165 cm) and a stroke of 9 feet (2.7 m). It could pump 2 million gallons of water per day at seven strokes per minute. It rises to the full height of the building, with the bearing for the beam supported by a Tuscan arcade of three arches.

=== Lichfield Waterworks Trust ===
The Lichfield Waterworks Trust, successor to the Friends of Sandfields Pumping Station, was formed in March 2015, at the time when a house building company became owners of a site that included the pumping station. The Trust negotiated an access licence, and from 2017 volunteers have maintained the engine and building. We are open each Tuesday and Friday morning from 10am - 12 pm. We can also host groups of visitors for tours by arrangement outside those times, and the venue is available for hire by community groups and other organisations.

== See also ==
- Listed buildings in Lichfield
