= Gailey railway station =

Former railway station in England

Gailey
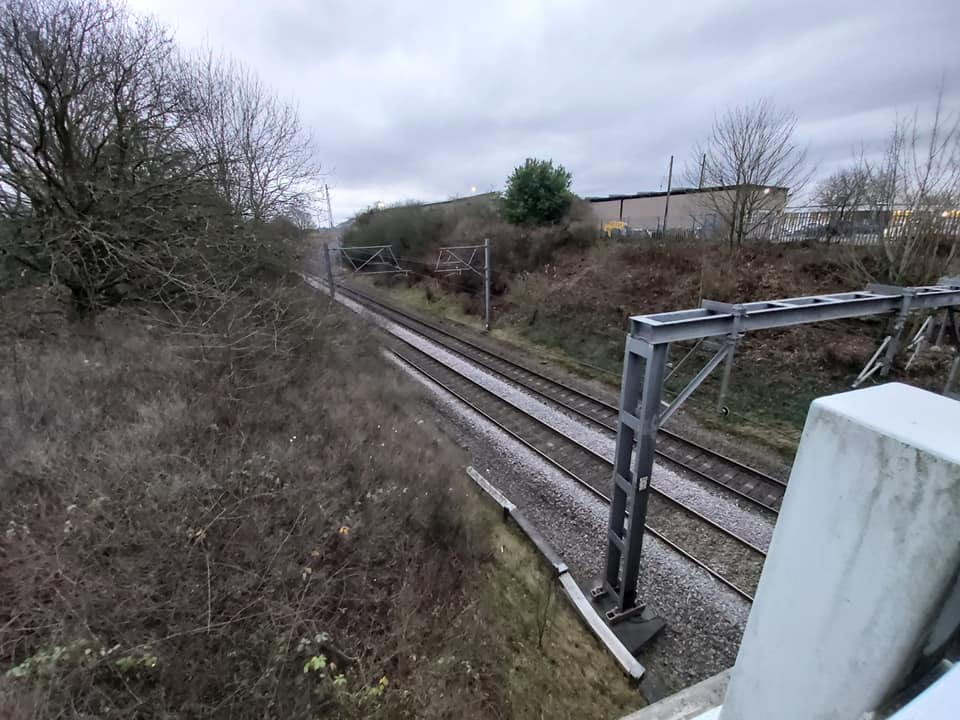
- Gailey station site in 2020

General information
- Location: Gailey, South Staffordshire; England
- Coordinates: 52.6917°N 2.1282°W
- Grid reference: SJ914104
- Platforms: 2

Other information
- Status: Disused

History
- Original company: Grand Junction Railway
- Pre-grouping: London and North Western Railway
- Post-grouping: London Midland and Scottish Railway

Key dates
- 1837: Opened as Spread Eagle
- 1881: Renamed to Gailey
- 1951: Closed to passenger traffic
Location

Gailey railway station was a railway station built by the Grand Junction Railway in 1837. It served the small village of Gailey, Staffordshire, 7 miles north of Wolverhampton City Centre, and was located near to the junction of the A5 and A449 roads. It was also close to the historic market town of Brewood.

== History ==
The original name of the station was Spread Eagle railway station, and was named after a nearby pub. It was renamed Gailey in 1881.

== Closure and present day ==
The station closed in 1951, although the Rugby-Birmingham-Stafford Line loop from the West Coast Main Line still runs through the site of the station today.

Preceding station	Disused railways	Following station
Four Ashes	London and North Western Railway former Grand Junction Railway	Penkridge
