= Cambridge Water Company =

British water company

Cambridge University and Town Waterworks Act 1853
- Act of Parliament
- Parliament of the United Kingdom
- Long title: An Act for supplying the Inhabitants of the University and Borough of Cambridge and other Places adjoining thereto with Water.
- Citation: 16 & 17 Vict. c. xxiii

Dates
- Royal assent: 14 June 1853

Text of statute as originally enacted

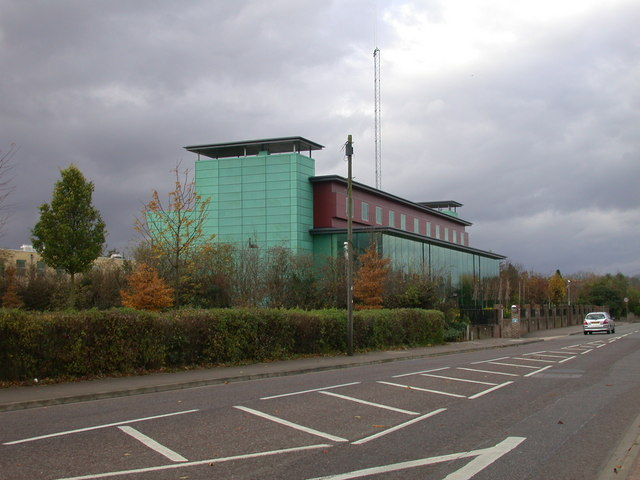
Offices of Cambridge Water Company on Fulbourn Road

Cambridge Water, a trading name of South Staffordshire Water plc, is a water supply utility company serving Cambridge and the surrounding area.

The Cambridge University and Town Waterworks Company was established by the Cambridge University and Town Waterworks Act 1853 (16 & 17 Vict. c. xxiii). The Cambridge Water Company was privately owned until became a public limited company by the Cambridge Water Company (Constitution and Regulation) Order 1996 (SI 1996/713).

Cambridge Water plc was sold to CK Infrastructure Holdings (CKI) in 2004, but was sold on to HSBC in 2011. The sale was made because CKI wanted to acquire Northumbrian Water, and retaining Cambridge Water would have resulted in the takeover of Northumbrian Water being referred to the Competition Commission. All the assets and liabilities were transferred to South Staffordshire Water on 1 April 2013, after which Cambridge Water plc ceased to trade. The Cambridge Water name continues to be used by South Staffordshire Water in the former Cambridge Water area.

Cambridge Water is a water supplier only and does not provide wastewater services. Anglian Water provides wastewater services to Cambridge Water customers.

For the first time in thirty years Cambridge Water Company have applied a temporary hosepipe ban. From 9 July 2026, hosepipe restrictions are in place across the Cambridge Water region following one of the driest springs in recent years and exceptionally warm weather throughout the summer so far. The restrictions would be enforceable from 1am on Friday 17 July 2026.

== Controversies ==
In 2022, Cambridge Water admitted that it failed to inform over a thousand of its customers that it had supplied water contaminated with four times the permitted amount of a 'forever chemical', known as perfluorooctanesulfonic acid (PFOS). People in the Stapleford and Great Shelford area received contaminated water supplies, derived from an aquifer near Duxford Airfield in June 2021. The water company refused to say how long customers had been receiving contaminated supplies, but stated that it had diluted water from that aquifer with water from other sources so as to lower the level of pollutant.

== Bibliography ==
- Ofwat (2006). "The Development of the Water Industry in England and Wales" (PDF). OFWAT.
