= Gailey, Staffordshire =

Village in Staffordshire, England

Coordinates: 52.694°N 2.129°W

Gailey
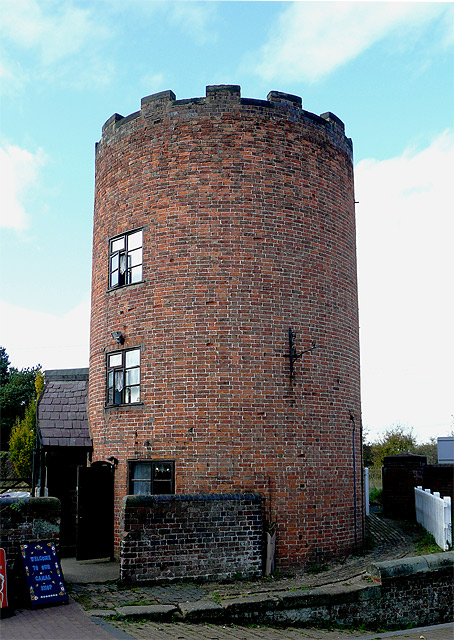
- Lock keeper's tower

- Location within Staffordshire
- OS grid reference: SJ912107
- Civil parish: Brewood and Coven; Penkridge
- District: South Staffordshire
- Shire county: Staffordshire
- Region: West Midlands
- Country: England
- Sovereign state: United Kingdom
- Post town: STAFFORD
- Postcode district: ST19
- Dialling code: 01902
- Police: Staffordshire
- Fire: Staffordshire
- Ambulance: West Midlands
- UK Parliament: Stone, Great Wyrley and Penkridge

Gailey is a small village in Staffordshire, England. It is at the junction of the A5 and A449 roads, and is on the boundary of the parishes of Brewood and Coven (formerly Brewood) and Penkridge, in South Staffordshire.

The village was in existence at the time of the Domesday Book (1086) when it was referred to as Gragelie. In the 19th century, Gailey was also known as Spread Eagle, from the name of the pub adjacent to the road junction.

In 1837, the Grand Junction Railway built a railway station in the village. The Rugby-Birmingham-Stafford Line still passes through the site, although the station at Gailey closed in 1951. Today the village is served by Select Bus service 878 which operates between Wolverhampton and Stafford. For a brief period in 2020, a Cannock - Telford bus service was trialled by Chaserider and operated along the A5 calling at a stop by the Spread Eagle crossroads.

== See also ==
- Gailey Reservoir
