= Blithfield Reservoir =

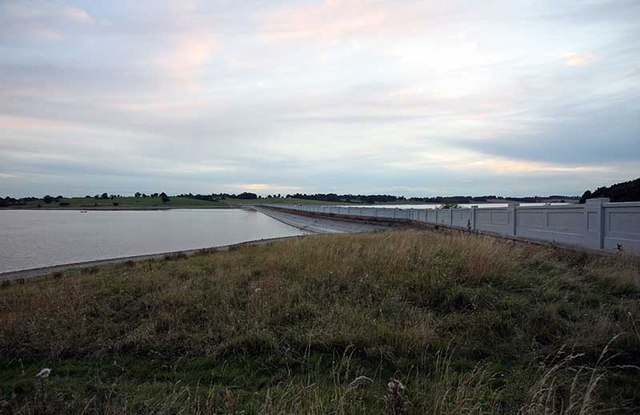
- Blithfield Reservoir

- Location within Staffordshire
- Location: Blithbury, Staffordshire, England
- Coordinates: 52.809°N 1.919°W
- Type: Drinking water reservoir
- Primary inflows: River Blithe, Tad Brook
- Primary outflows: River Blithe
- Managing agency: South Staffordshire Water
- Built: 1953
- Max. length: 1.88 miles (3.03 km)
- Max. width: 0.6 miles (0.97 km)
- Surface area: 3.19 square kilometres (790 acres)
- Max. depth: 16 metres (52 ft)
- Water volume: 18,172,000m^{3} (4 billion gallons)
- Shore length^{1}: 5.9 miles (9.5 km)
- ^{1} Shore length is not a well-defined measure.

Blithfield Reservoir is a large raw water reservoir in Staffordshire, England, owned by South Staffordshire Water.

The reservoir was authorised by the South Staffordshire Waterworks Act 1939 (2 & 3 Geo. 6. c. lxii). Some 790 acres (320 hectares) of reservoir was formed on land sold by Baron Bagot to the South Staffordshire Water Works (SSWW) in the 1940s. Blithfield Reservoir was opened by Queen Elizabeth the Queen Mother on Tuesday 27 October 1953.

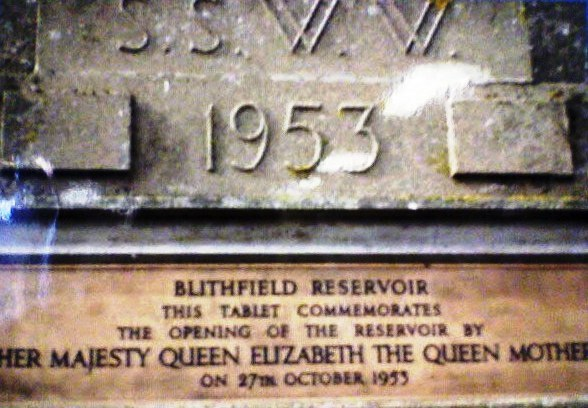
Opening Plaque, Blithfield Reservoir

The reservoir is located just north-east of the town of Rugeley and just south of Abbots Bromley.

The reservoir is fed by the River Blithe, the Little Blithe, and Tad Brook, giving a relatively small catchment area. The reservoir supplies water to the Seedy Mill water treatment works near Lichfield.

The reservoir is a haven for wildlife, particularly birds, a fact that was recognised in 1988 when the reservoir and most of its surrounding woodland was designated as a Site of Special Scientific Interest (SSSI). Parts of the shoreline and surrounding woodland are only available to birdwatchers under a permit scheme, operated by the West Midland Bird Club, but much of the open water is visible from the road causeway which crosses the reservoir (grid reference SK055235), and there is access to the dam end of the reservoir. There is also an education centre to facilitate visits by school parties.

Blithfield was once a "members only" fly fishing destination, but, in recent years, it has been opened up to day ticket holders. Day tickets are available from the Estate Office.

Blithfield reservoir walks give members of the public the chance to enjoy the area and its wildlife. The reservoir has been visited by many scarce and rare migrant birds, including an inland Arctic warbler (1993), Bonaparte's gull (1994 and 1996), blue-winged teal (1996 and 2000) and squacco heron (2004). More recent sightings at Blithfield Reservoir, all in 2025, include the ruddy shelduck, yellow legged gull, osprey, white wagtail and lesser scaup. Birds observed in 2024 include greenshank, great white egret, whimbrel, green sandpiper and yellow wagtail.

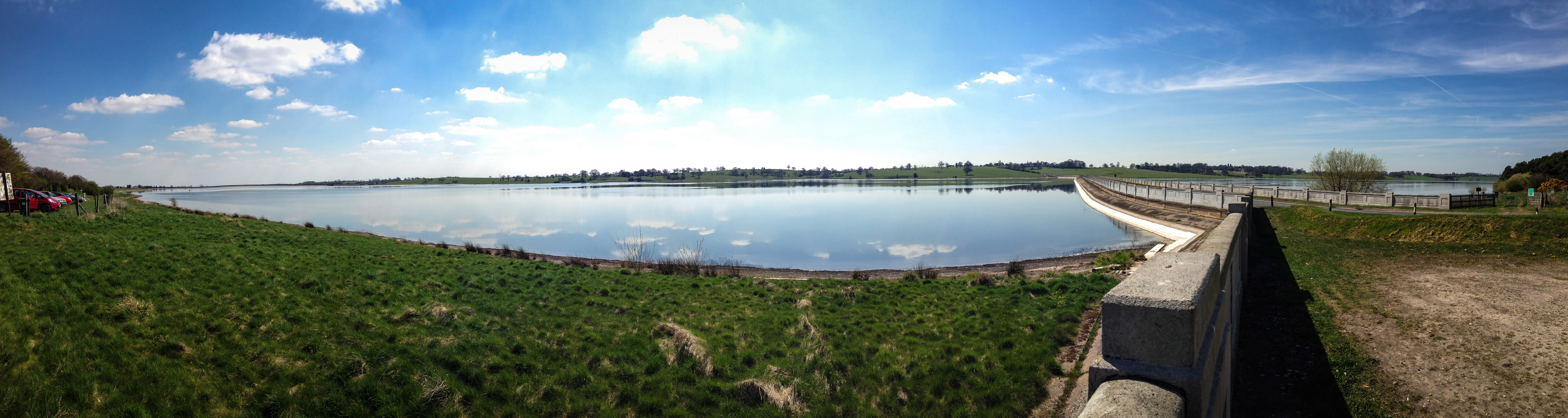
Panorama of Blithfield Reservoir
