= Gailey Reservoirs =

Reservoirs in Staffordshire, England

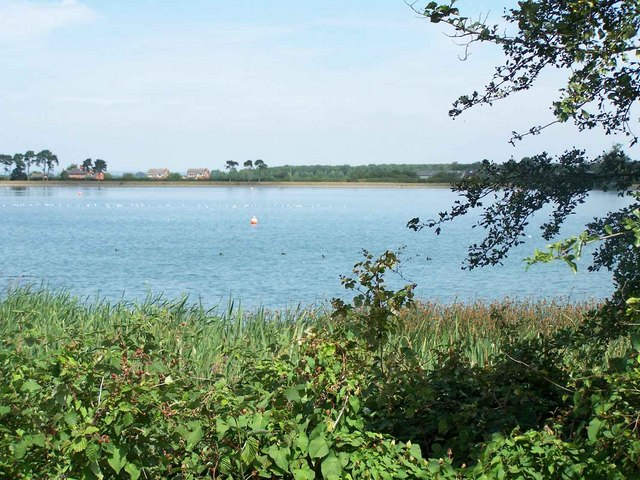
- Gailey Upper Reservoir

- Location within Staffordshire
- Location: South Staffordshire
- Coordinates: 52.69035°N 2.09760°W
- Lake type: reservoirs
- Primary outflows: Staffordshire and Worcestershire Canal
- Managing agency: Canal & River Trust
- Built: 1855
- Surface area: 337,000 square metres (83 acres)

Gailey Reservoir is a pair of canal feeder reservoirs in South Staffordshire, separated by a dam, and owned by the Canal & River Trust. Gailey Upper Reservoir is to the east; Gailey Lower Reservoir to the west.

A connected reservoir, Calf Heath Reservoir, stands a little further to the west, beyond the M6 motorway. Calf Heath Reservoir is also where Greensforge Sailing Club is located. Greensforge Sailing Club is one of the oldest sailing clubs in the Midlands.

Gailey Reservoir is the site of a nature reserve, operated by the West Midland Bird Club. Entry is by permit only. There is a large heronry on the island on the lower part.

The upper lake fishing is run by the Prince Albert Angling Society. The lower lake fishing is run by a syndicate called the Noddy boys.

The reservoir is located at grid reference SJ935103.

== See also ==
- Gailey, Staffordshire
