= Robert S. Gailey =

American physical therapist (born 1957)

Robert S. Gailey Jr. (born 1957) is an American physical therapist, professor at the University of Miami Miller School of Medicine Department of Physical Therapy, and the Director of the Neil Spielholz Functional Outcomes Research & Evaluation Center. His research efforts include amputee rehabilitation, prosthetic gait, and functional assessment.

He developed the Amputee Mobility Predictor (AMP), an outcome measure designed to evaluate the ambulatory potential of lower-limb amputees with and without the use of a prosthesis.

In 2002, he was appointed as a Special Advisor to the United States Department of Defense for amputee rehabilitation. In the aftermath of the 2010 Haiti earthquake, he served as the rehabilitation coordinator for Project Medishare.

== Career ==
In 1986, Gailey joined the University of Miami Division of Physical Therapy as an associate professor. He received tenure in 2007.

Gailey's academic work has focused on amputee rehabilitation. He has developed a variety of exercise and training programs for people with lower limb amputations. The topics of these programs range from post-amputation surgery, to prosthetic gait training, to high-level activities and sports.

He has also developed or modified several outcome measures of amputee mobility. In 2002, he published the Amputee Mobility Predictor (AMP), designed to determine the mobility of lower-limb amputees. The measure can assess amputees with and without the use of a prosthesis, and assists with the Medicare Functional Classification Level (MFCL) assignment by clinicians. In 2013, he published the Comprehensive High-level Activity Mobility Predictor (CHAMP), a measure developed for the United States military to evaluate high-level mobility of people with lower limb amputations.

According to Scopus, as of August 2020, he has authored 57 peer-reviewed publications and book chapters. His works have been cited 1389 times in 1044 documents.

=== Peer-reviewed publications ===
- Gailey, R.; Allen, K.; Castles, J.; Kucharik, J.; Roeder, M. (2008). "Review of secondary physical conditions associated with lower-limb amputation and long-term prosthesis use". Journal of Rehabilitation Research and Development. 45 (1): 15–29. doi:10.1682/jrrd.2006.11.0147. PMID 18566923.
- Gailey, R. S.; Roach, K. E.; Applegate, E. B.; Cho, B.; Cunniffe, B.; Licht, S.; Maguire, M.; Nash, M. S. (2002). "The amputee mobility predictor: An instrument to assess determinants of the lower-limb amputee's ability to ambulate". Archives of Physical Medicine and Rehabilitation. 83 (5): 613–627. doi:10.1053/apmr.2002.32309. PMID 11994800.
- Gailey, R. S.; Wenger, M. A.; Raya, M.; Kirk, N.; Erbs, K.; Spyropoulos, P.; Nash, M. S. (1994). "Energy expenditure of trans-tibial amputees during ambulation at self-selected pace". Prosthetics and Orthotics International. 18 (2): 84–91. doi:10.3109/03093649409164389. PMID 7991365.
- Raya, Michele A.; Gailey, Robert S.; Gaunaurd, Ignacio A.; Jayne, Daniel M.; Campbell, Stuart M.; Gagne, Erica; Manrique, Patrick G.; Muller, Daniel G.; Tucker, Christen (2013). "Comparison of three agility tests with male servicemembers: Edgren Side Step Test, T-Test, and Illinois Agility Test". Journal of Rehabilitation Research and Development. 50 (7): 951–960. doi:10.1682/JRRD.2012.05.0096. PMID 24301432.

=== Selected honors and awards ===
- 2019 Catherine Worthingham Fellow American Physical Therapy Association.
- 2015 American Academy of Orthotics and Prosthetics Researcher Award.
- 2011 American Academy of Orthotics and Prosthetics Honorary Member.* 2009 American Physical Therapy Association’s Henry & Florence Kendall Practice Award.
- 2007 American Orthotic and Prosthetics Association Thranhardt Lecture winner.
- 2003 Ernest Burgess Award Given to “outstanding clinicians, researchers, advocates and professionals who serve the limb loss community.”
