= Admaston, Staffordshire =

Small hamlet in Staffordshire, England

Coordinates: 52.80633°N 1.92727°W

Admaston
- Location within Staffordshire
- OS grid reference: SK050232
- District: East Staffordshire
- Shire county: Staffordshire
- Region: West Midlands
- Country: England
- Sovereign state: United Kingdom
- Post town: RUGELEY
- Postcode district: WS15
- Police: Staffordshire
- Fire: Staffordshire
- Ambulance: West Midlands

Admaston is a small hamlet in Staffordshire, England just outside the town of Rugeley near to Abbots Bromley and Blithfield Hall.

The name Admaston is derived from the Anglo-Saxon personal name Ēadmund and means 'Ēadmund's town'; it was recorded in the 12th century as Edmundestone and Admerdeston, and in the 13th century as Admundestan and Edmundestone.

It is a namesake of Admaston/Bromley township in Renfrew County, Eastern Ontario, Canada, which took part of its name from this hamlet in the 19th century.
