= South Staffordshire Water =

British water company

South Staffordshire Water plc
- Company type: Private-fund owned public limited company
- Industry: Utility
- Founded: 1853
- Headquarters: Walsall, West Midlands, England
- Key people: Sir James Perowne - Chairman; Phil Newland - Managing Director
- Brands: Cambridge Water
- Parent: Arjun Infrastructure Partners
- Subsidiaries: SSI Services, Echo Managed Services
- Website: www.south-staffs-water.co.uk

South Staffordshire Water plc, known as South Staffs Water, is a UK water supply company owned by a privately-owned utilities company serving parts of Staffordshire, the West Midlands, as well as small areas of surrounding counties in England. South Staffordshire Water plc is part of South Staffordshire plc. It purchased Cambridge Water in 2011. In 2013, KKR & Co. L.P., a company registered in the United States of America, acquired South Staffordshire Water from Alinda Infrastructure Fund. As of April 2018, KKR & Co. has agreed to sell its 75% equity stake in South Staffordshire Water to Arjun Infrastructure Partners (AIP).

== Company ==
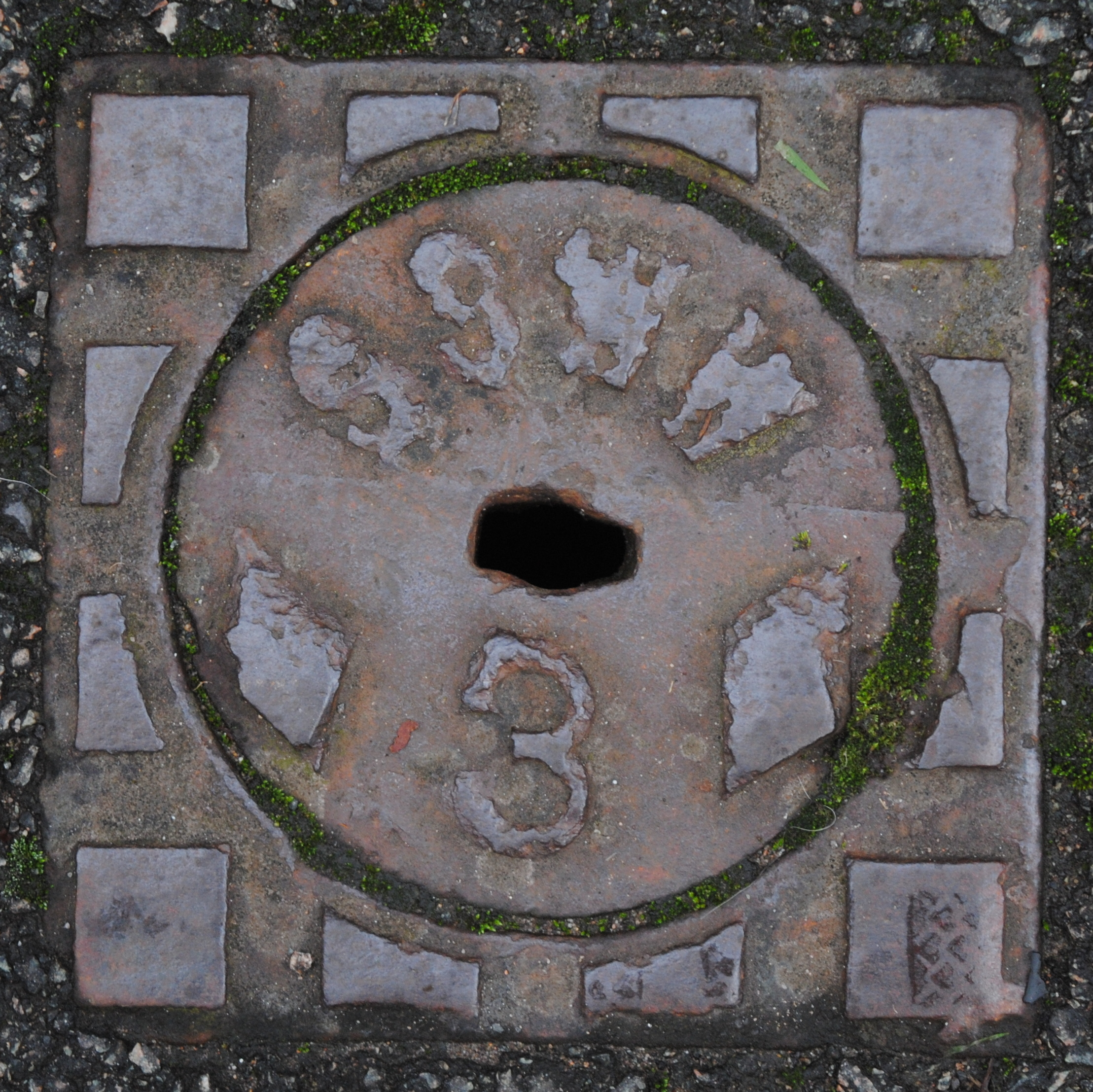
A South Staffordshire Water Works stop-cock cover in Sutton Coldfield, Birmingham, England

South Staffordshire Water provides drinking water to 1.6 million consumers and supplies 330 million litres of water every day across a network of pipes that total 6,000 kilometres (3,700 mi) in length to approximately 500,000 homes and 36,000 business customers in an area covering 1,500 square kilometres (580 sq mi). Under Ofwat's measure of overall service to customers, OPA, the company has been positioned in the top five of the generally 20–23 water companies in every year since 1999.

As South Staffordshire Water is a water-only company, Severn Trent Water provides all mains sewerage services to customers in South Staffordshire's designated area.

== Supply area ==
The South Staffordshire Water supply area covers areas to the north and west of Birmingham. The majority of the supply area is within the counties of Staffordshire and the West Midlands but the company also supplies water to parts of Derbyshire, Leicestershire, Warwickshire and Worcestershire.

- Uttoxeter
- Burton upon Trent
- Rugeley
- Cannock
- Lichfield
- Brownhills
- Burntwood
- Tamworth
- Aldridge
- Walsall
- Sutton Coldfield
- West Bromwich
- Kinver
- Tipton
- Dudley
- Rowley Regis
- Willington
- Etwall

== Performance ==
South Staffordshire Water was joint first with Anglian Water in Ofwat's Service Incentive Mechanism ‘Satisfaction by Company’ survey 2012/13.

The company were 99.91% compliant with drinking water quality tests carried out in 2012/13.

Leakage performance was at 65.3 megalitres per day in 2012/13, compared to 68.2 Ml/d in 2011/12 and 72.8 Ml/d in 2010/11.

The annual operational greenhouse gas emissions of the regulated business were 55.41 kilotonnes in 2012/13, compared to 61.61 ktC02e in 2011/12.

== Water sources ==
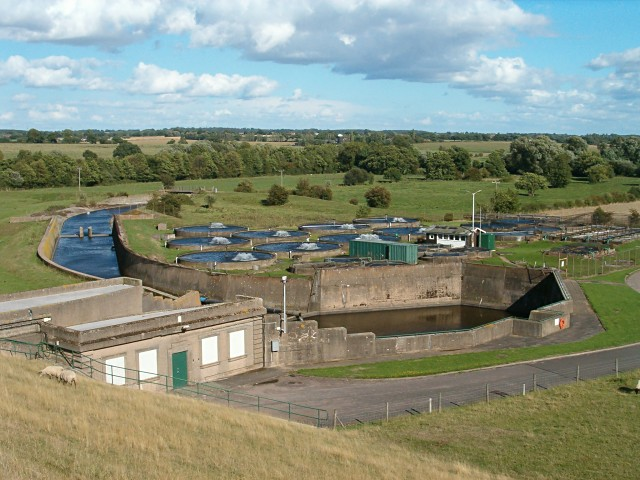
Water treatment works at Blithfield Reservoir

Two of South Staffordshire Water's reservoirs supply 60% of water demand with the remainder provided by 69 boreholes.

=== Reservoirs ===
- Barr Beacon Reservoir, Barr Beacon, Walsall, 52.5756°N 1.91152°W
- Blithfield Reservoir, Abbots Bromley, Staffordshire 52.809°N 1.919°W
- Chelmarsh Reservoir, Chelmarsh, Shropshire 52.485334°N 2.393113°W

== History ==
South Staffordshire Waterworks Act 1853
- Act of Parliament
- Parliament of the United Kingdom
- Long title: An Act for supplying with Water the Inhabitants of Walsall, Dudley, and other Places in the Southern Parts of the County of Stafford, and in certain Parts of the County of Worcester adjacent thereto.
- Citation: 16 & 17 Vict. c. cxxxiii

Dates
- Royal assent: 4 August 1853

Text of statute as originally enacted

South Staffordshire Waterworks Act 1866
- Act of Parliament
- Parliament of the United Kingdom
- Long title: An Act to confer further Powers on the South Staffordshire Waterworks Company with reference to their Undertaking, and to enable them to extend their Works and District of Supply; and for other Purposes.
- Citation: 29 & 30 Vict. c. lix

Dates
- Royal assent: 11 June 1866

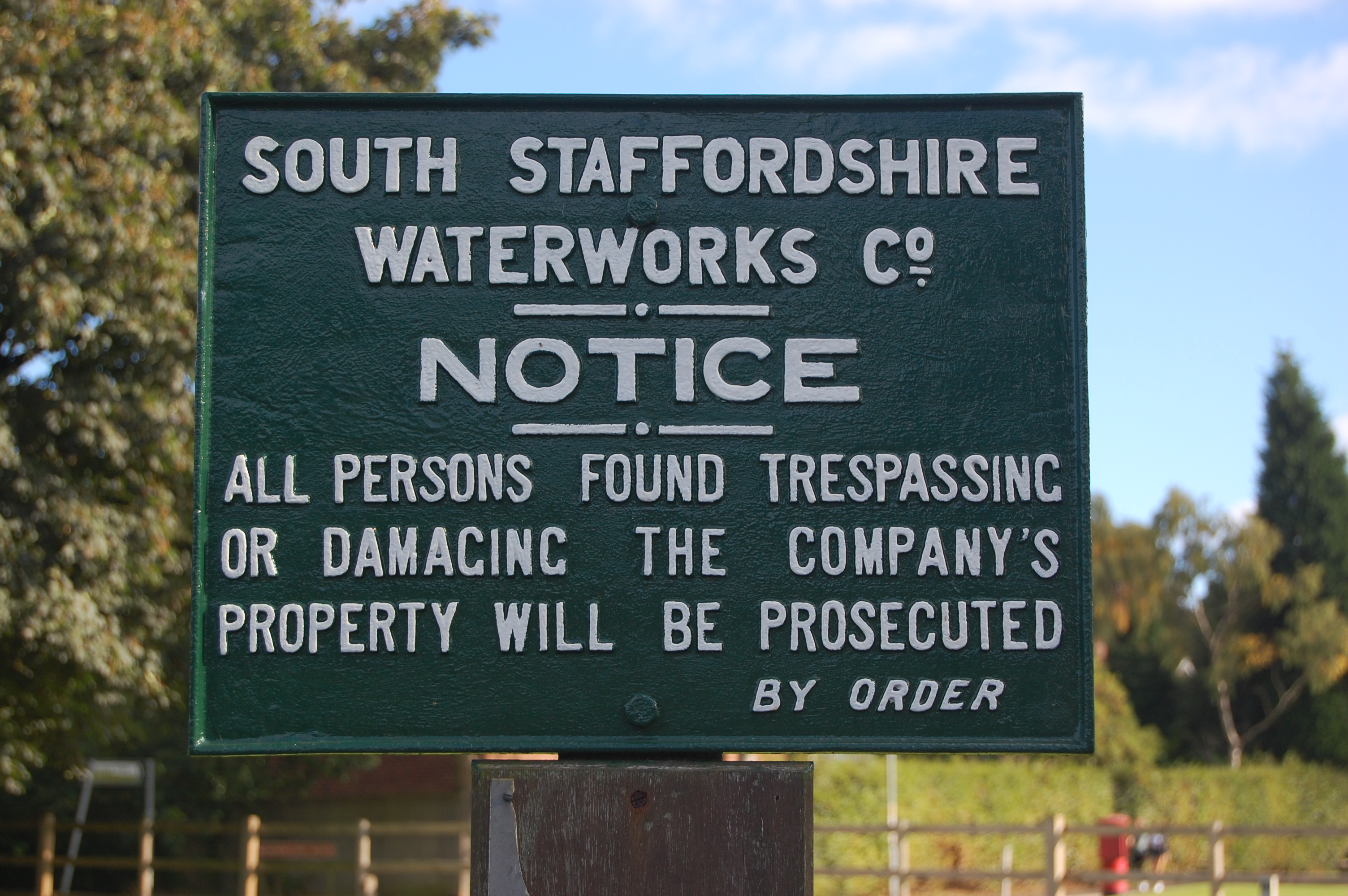
Cast iron sign at the company's Foley Road West site

- 1853 South Staffordshire Waterworks Company is formed by the South Staffordshire Waterworks Act 1853 (16 & 17 Vict. c. cxxxiii)
- 1858 Opening of the works in Walsall. Wednesbury is the first area supplied
- 1858 Opening of Sandfields Pumping Station near Lichfield
- 1860 Tipton and West Bromwich receive water supplies

- 1862 SSWC take over Dudley Waterworks Company by section 46 of the South Staffordshire Waterworks Act 1853. Netherton and Oldbury receive water supplies

- 1864 SSWC take over Burton Waterworks Company
- 1875 Cannock area supplied
- 1929 SSWC take over Kinver Waterworks.
- The Lichfield Conduit Lands Trust contracts with SSWC to supply bulk water to central Lichfield
- 1953 Blithfield Reservoir, Abbots Bromley near Rugeley, is opened by Queen Elizabeth The Queen Mother
- 1962 SSWC take over Tamworth Waterworks and their Hopwas Pumping Station on 1 July from the Tamworth Waterworks Joint Committee
- 1963 The SSWC takes over the water supply infrastructure of the Lichfield Conduit Lands Trust
- 1968 takes over water supply for Uttoxeter and Seisdon by the South Staffordshire Water (Seisdon and Uttoxeter) Order 1968 (SI 1968/447)
- 1991 South Staffordshire Waterworks Company became a public limited company in 1991 and was listed on the London Stock Exchange as South Staffordshire Water.
- 1992 South Staffordshire Water Holdings (eventually South Staffordshire Group plc) was created to grow non-regulated businesses.
- 1996 Blithfield Education Centre is opened by Bill Oddie
- 2004 South Staffordshire Group plc (which became HomeServe plc) de-merged South Staffordshire plc, which included South Staffordshire Water, Echo, Rapid, Underground Pipeline Services and Aqua Direct, as a separate listed company on the London Stock Exchange.
- 2004 Acquired by Arcapita Bank, a Bahrain-based company, at a price of £11.20 per share (£237m including debt) and delisted from the Stock Exchange.
- 2007 Acquired by Alinda Infrastructure Fund, a European and American investor in infrastructure assets.
- 2013 Acquired by KKR & Co. L.P. (formerly known as Kohlberg Kravis Roberts & Co.), an American multinational private equity firm, specializing in leveraged buyouts, headquartered in New York.
- 2018 Acquired by Arjun Infrastructure Partners (AIP)

Coat of arms of South Staffordshire Water
Crest On a wreath Argent and Vert issuant from water a mound of sand thereon a knot (Calidris canutus) in winter plumage all Proper. Escutcheon Sable on a pile harry wavy Argent and Azure fimbriated Vert a Stafford knot Or all between three fountains. Motto Nil Sine Aqua
