= Havelock Academy =

Location
- Holyoake Road; Old Clee, Grimsby, North East Lincolnshire, DN32 8JH; England
- 53°33′35″N 0°03′04″W

Information
- Type: Academy
- Motto: Broadening Horizons
- Established: September 2007
- Department for Education URN: 135294 Tables
- Ofsted: Reports
- Sponsor: David Ross Education Trust
- Principal: Emily Grace Marshall
- Gender: Coeducational
- Age: 11 to 18
- Enrolment: 918
- Former name: Havelock School
- Website: havelockacademy.co.uk

Havelock Academy is a secondary school and sixth form with academy status, in Grimsby, North East Lincolnshire, England.

== Admissions ==
It is north of the A46 road, near the junction with the A1031, on the opposite of the road from the former Matthew Humberstone School.

== History ==
The school was opened as Carr Lane Senior Mixed School and Carr Lane Junior Mixed School, under separate headteachers, in 1937.

In 1956 the school's name was changed from Carr Lane Secondary School to Havelock School. This was after Havelok the Dane.

It had around 900 boys and girls in the 1960s, administered by the County Borough of Grimsby Education Committee. It had grammar, technical, commercial and modern streams. The MP Martin Vickers, who left the school in 1967, said in a parliamentary debate on social mobility that it was "a bilateral school. It had both a grammar stream and a secondary stream under the same roof, and there was movement between the two. I would say that, in reality, it was a perfect comprehensive".

It became an actual comprehensive in 1968 with 1300 boys and girls. From 1974–96 it was administered by Humberside Education Committee. In the early 1980s there were 1200 students, and the school had a sixth form, which was closed in 1990 along with all other local sixth forms.

It became an academy in 2007, sponsored by the David Ross Education Trust. The academy was officially opened by The Duchess of Cambridge on 5 March 2013; she was carrying out engagements in Grimsby on the day.

The sixth form was re-established under the headship of Nicholas O'Sullivan, who was in post from 2007 to 2011; his obituary noted that the sixth form had been created despite "the catchment of acute deprivation". Martin Vickers said that the school's catchment area "includes the East Marsh ward of Grimsby, which is ranked among the 20th poorest wards in the country by various socioeconomic indicators". In 2007, the school was described in research as one of a group of schools "facing exceptionally challenging circumstances", because of local levels of unemployment and the high proportion of adults in the area who had no qualifications. The then headteacher said that pupils were often malnourished. Improvement work at the school included marketing, counselling and pastoral care, as well as work on teaching quality.

== Academic results ==
As a comprehensive, the school came in the bottom thirty schools in England at GCSE. In 2000, it came in the bottom forty. Around 6% gained 5 good GCSE grades.

In 2009, as an academy, around 40% gain five good GCSEs – the fourth best in Grimsby.

== Notable former pupils ==
=== Carr Lane School ===
- Sir Patrick Cormack, Conservative MP from 1970–4 for Cannock, from 1974–83 for South West Staffordshire and from 1983–2010 for South Staffordshire; he was the first pupil from Carr Lane to attend university

=== The Havelock School ===
- Prof David Drewry, Vice-Chancellor from 1999-2009 of the University of Hull
- Raymond Plant, Baron Plant of Highfield, Master from 1994–2000 of St Catherine's College, Oxford
- Martin Vickers, MP for Cleethorpes, 2010–present
