= James Eversfield =

English landowner and administrator

High Sheriff of Sussex
- In office 1822–1822

Personal details
- Born: 1795 Catsfield, Sussex, England
- Died: 29 September 1826 (aged 30–31)
- Resting place: St Mary's Church, Horsham, Sussex, England
- Education: Peterhouse, Cambridge

James Eversfield was an English landowner who served as High Sheriff of Sussex.

== Life ==
Baptised on 1 November 1795 in the church of St Laurence in Catsfield, he was the younger son of William Markwick, who later changed his name to Eversfield, and his wife Mary. On 15 June 1815 in the church of St James, Piccadilly he married Mary Crew (1795–1872), daughter of Robert Hawgood Crew, Secretary to the Board of Ordnance, and his wife Mary Sophia Foreman, daughter of John Foreman. In 1818 his elder brother died, making him heir to the family's extensive landholdings, which included the manor and mansion of Catsfield as well as lands in Pevensey, Ninfield, Mountfield, Battle and Bexhill.

He served as High Sheriff of Sussex in 1822. Following the death of his mother in 1823, he sold the Catsfield property and moved to Denne Park outside Horsham. In 1825 he was one of the six proprietors of the Baybridge Canal at West Grinstead. Aged only 30 when he died, his will was proved on 13 Nov 1826.

He and Mary had three children:

- Ann Isabella Mary Eversfield (1816–1904), who in 1837 married Charles Goodwin Bethune (1810–1864), who later changed his last name to Eversfield. They had sixteen children, including the cricketer Henry Beauclerk Bethune.
- Sophia Eversfield (1819–1901), who in 1845 married Henry Paget, 3rd Marquess of Anglesey, but had no children.
- Charles Gilbert Eversfield (1822–1886), who in 1848 married Isabella Pigott (1820–1902). Having no children, they adopted Lucy Barbara Vaughan (1837-1905), his mother's stepdaughter by her third marriage, and she in 1871 married Edward Maximilian Bethune (1842-1912), the eldest surviving son of her adoptive father's elder sister.

His widow Mary in 1827 married Henry Tredcroft (1788-1844), becoming the mother of Edward Tredcroft, and, widowed a second time, in 1847 married the Reverend John James Vaughan (1809-1881), son of Sir John Vaughan.
