= Hugh Tyrwhitt =

English Royal Navy officer (1856–1907)

Captain The Honourable Hugh Tyrwhitt CSI CVO
- Born: 14 July 1856
- Died: 26 October 1907 (aged 51)
- Children: Lord Berners
- Relatives: Harriet Tyrwhitt, 12th Baroness Berners (mother)
- Military career
- Allegiance: United Kingdom
- Branch: Royal Navy
- Rank: Captain
- Commands: HMS Renown (1900-02)
- Conflicts: Mahdist War

Captain Hugh Tyrwhitt (14 July 1856 – 26 October 1907) was a Royal Navy officer who served as Private Secretary to the First Lord of the Admiralty. He was the father of noted aesthete and composer Lord Berners.

== Early life ==
Tyrwhitt was born in 1856, the second surviving son of Sir Henry Thomas Tyrwhitt, 3rd Baronet (son of Sir Thomas Tyrwhitt-Jones, 2nd Baronet) and Harriet Tyrwhitt, 12th Baroness Berners. His elder brother Raymond Tyrwhitt succeeded as 13th Baron Berners, and his sister Hon. Arden Mary Tyrwhitt was the wife of Francis Knollys, 1st Viscount Knollys, Private Secretary to King Edward VII.

== Career ==
He was commissioned a sub-lieutenant in the Royal Navy in June 1876, and promoted to lieutenant in February 1881. He served as flag lieutenant to the Commander-in-Chief of the Mediterranean Fleet, served with the Naval Brigade in Sudan and took part in the Nile Expedition to relieve General Charles Gordon in 1884. Promotion to commander followed in June 1893, and to captain in January 1899. On 19 March 1900 he was appointed in command of the battleship Renown, flag ship to Admiral Sir John Fisher, Commander-in-Chief of the Mediterranean Fleet. Fisher hauled down his flag in June 1902 to become Second Naval Lord, and Tyrwhitt was succeeded as captain on the Renown by Arthur Farquhar. Following Fisher's recommendation, Tyrwhitt was on 9 October that year appointed Private Secretary to the First Lord of the Admiralty. In 1905 he was again given command of the Renown and escorted the Duke and Duchess of York to India. He died two years later.

== Personal life ==
On 10 August 1882, Tyrwhitt was married to Julia Mary Foster (d. 1931), a daughter of William Orme Foster, MP for South Staffordshire, and the former Isabella Grazebrook. Together, they were the parents of:

- Gerald Hugh Tyrwhitt-Wilson, 14th Baron Berners (1883–1950), the composer, novelist, painter, and aesthete who never married.

Tyrwhitt died on 26 October 1907.

== Sources ==
- Jones, Bryony (2 January 2003). The Music of Lord Berners (1883-1950): The Versatile Peer (Illustrated ed.). Ashgate Publishing Ltd. ISBN 978-0754608523.

Military offices
| Preceded by Wilmot Fawkes | Private Secretary to the First Lord of the Admiralty; 1902–1905 | Succeeded by Hugh Evan-Thomas |
