= Martin Vickers =

British Conservative politician

Martin Vickers MP
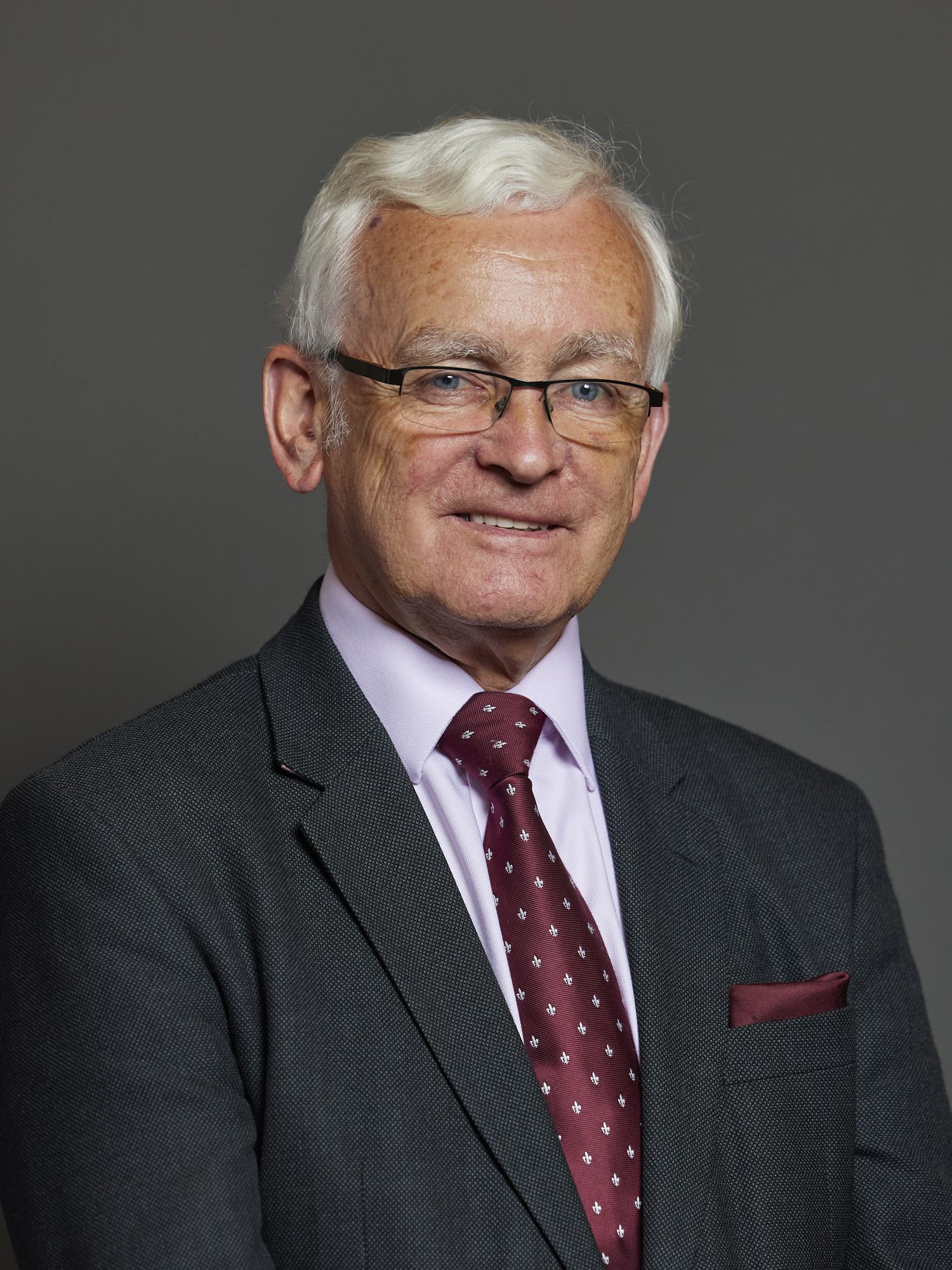
- Official portrait, 2024

Member of Parliament
- Incumbent
- Assumed office 6 May 2010
- Preceded by: Shona McIsaac
- Constituency: Cleethorpes (2010–2024); Brigg and Immingham (2024–present)
- Majority: 3,243 (7.6%)

Personal details
- Born: Martin John Vickers; 13 September 1950 (age 76) Cleethorpes, Lincolnshire, England
- Party: Conservative
- Spouse: Ann Gill
- Children: 1
- Education: University of Lincoln
- Website: www.martinvickers.org.uk

Martin John Vickers (born 13 September 1950) is a British Conservative Party politician. He was elected as the Member of Parliament (MP) for Brigg and Immingham since the 2024 general election. He previously represented the Cleethorpes constituency from 2010 until its abolition in 2024.

== Early life ==
Born in Cleethorpes, Lincolnshire, Vickers was educated at Havelock School and Grimsby College. He gained a politics degree at the University of Lincoln after six years as a part-time student in 2004. His father, Norman Vickers of 140 Heneage Road in Grimsby, died, aged 71, in May 1988, having worked for 42 years with British United Trawlers, and served in World War II in the Army.

In 1979, he stood as a Conservative candidate for the Cromwell ward on Great Grimsby Borough Council, but was not successful. In 1980, he was elected as a councillor for the Weelsby ward on that council. Having only narrowly held his seat in 1986 by just 74 votes, he changed seats in 1990 to the Scartho ward (even then, only winning by an even narrower 30 votes) while Labour comfortably gained his old seat. In May 1994, he lost his seat in Scartho to the Liberal Democrats.

In 1995, he stood for the Scartho ward (with boundaries similar to the former Humberside County Council division) on the then-newly created unitary authority North East Lincolnshire Council which replaced the Great Grimsby and Cleethorpes borough councils, but was unsuccessful. He did, however, gain the seat from Labour in May 1999 and remained on the authority until 2011.

Before being elected an MP, he served as full-time Conservative agent for Edward Leigh. He had a newsagents on Freeman Street, the Card Cabin.

== Parliamentary career ==
Vickers was elected to the House of Commons as Member of Parliament (MP) for Cleethorpes in the 2010 general election, by a majority of 4,298. On 24 October 2011, Vickers was one of 81 Conservative MPs to rebel against the Cameron government to vote for a national referendum on the European Union. He was re-elected in the 2015, 2017, 2019 and 2024 elections.

In December 2024, he replaced Wendy Morton on the Backbench Business Committee.

== Political views and parliamentary voting record ==
Vickers opposes the legalisation of same-sex marriage. He voted against Marriage (Same Sex Couples) Act 2013 which introduced it in England and Wales. Vickers also voted against similar legislation which introduced it in Northern Ireland in 2019. In the same year, Vickers was one of 21 MPs who voted against LGBT inclusive sex and relationship education in English schools. He also voted against the legalisation of abortion in Northern Ireland in 2019.

Despite his social conservative views on gay rights and abortions, Vickers has maintained he opposes the reintroduction of the death penalty.

Vickers supported Brexit in the 2016 EU membership referendum. He voted for then Prime Minister Theresa May's Brexit withdrawal agreement.

He is a member of the Conservative Christian Fellowship. As of 31 July 2019, Vickers is the vice chair of the APPGs for Albania, Azerbaijan, Central America, Faroe Islands, Iceland, Isle of Man, East Coast Main Line, Economic Development, Fair Fuel for UK Motorists and UK Hauliers, Fisheries, Football, Rail in the North, Transport Across the North, and Yorkshire and Northern Lincolnshire. He is the secretary of the APPG for Australia and New Zealand and the treasurer for the APPG for Heritage Rail. He is also the chair of the APPG for Kosovo, North Macedonia, Freeports, Oil Refining Sector, Rail. Vickers is co-chair of the APPG for Montenegro and an officer for the APPG for Serbia and River Thames.

Following an interim report on the connections between colonialism and properties now in the care of the National Trust, including links with historic slavery, Vickers was among the signatories of a letter to The Telegraph in November 2020 from the "Common Sense Group" of Conservative MPs. The letter accused the National Trust of being "coloured by cultural Marxist dogma, colloquially known as the 'woke agenda'".

== Personal life ==
He married Ann Gill on Saturday 3 October 1981 at St Peter's church in Cleethorpes, and they have one daughter. His wife works in his parliamentary office as a part-time junior secretary.

== Electoral history ==
General election 2024: Brigg and Immingham
Party	Candidate	Votes	%	±%
Conservative	Martin Vickers	15,905	37.4	−34.5
Labour	Najmul Hussain	12,662	29.8	+9.6
Reform	Paul Ladlow	10,594	24.9	+24.2
Green	Amie Watson	1,905	4.5	+1.7
Liberal Democrats	Eleanor Rylance	1,442	3.4	−1.0
Majority		3,243	7.6	−44.1
Turnout		42,508	57.2	−8.8
Registered electors		74,297		
Conservative hold		Swing	−22.1	

Parliament of the United Kingdom
Preceded by Shona McIsaac	Member of Parliament for Cleethorpes; 2010–2024	Constituency abolished
New constituency	Member of Parliament for Brigg and Immingham; 2024–present	Incumbent
