= E. Tredcroft's Ground =

Cricket ground in Horsham, Sussex, England

Ground information
- Location: Horsham, Sussex
- Coordinates: 51.0852°N 0.3403°W
- Establishment: 1851 (first recorded match)

Team information
Sussex	(1853-1855)
- As of 27 August 2010; Source: Ground profile

E. Tredcroft's Ground was a cricket ground at the Warnham Court estate, located at Horsham, Sussex. The first recorded match on the ground was in 1851, when the Gentlemen of Sussex played the Gentlemen of Surrey. Edward Tredcroft, after whom the ground is named, was part of the Gentlemen of Sussex team. The first first-class match held at the ground came in 1853 when Sussex played the Marylebone Cricket Club. Sussex played two further first-class matches at the ground; in 1854 and 1855, with both matches coming against the Marylebone Cricket Club. The 1855 fixture was the final recorded match on the ground. A woodland was later planted inside the boundary of the ground.
