= Patrick Cormack =

British politician (1939–2024)

The Right Honourable The Lord Cormack DL FSA FRHistS
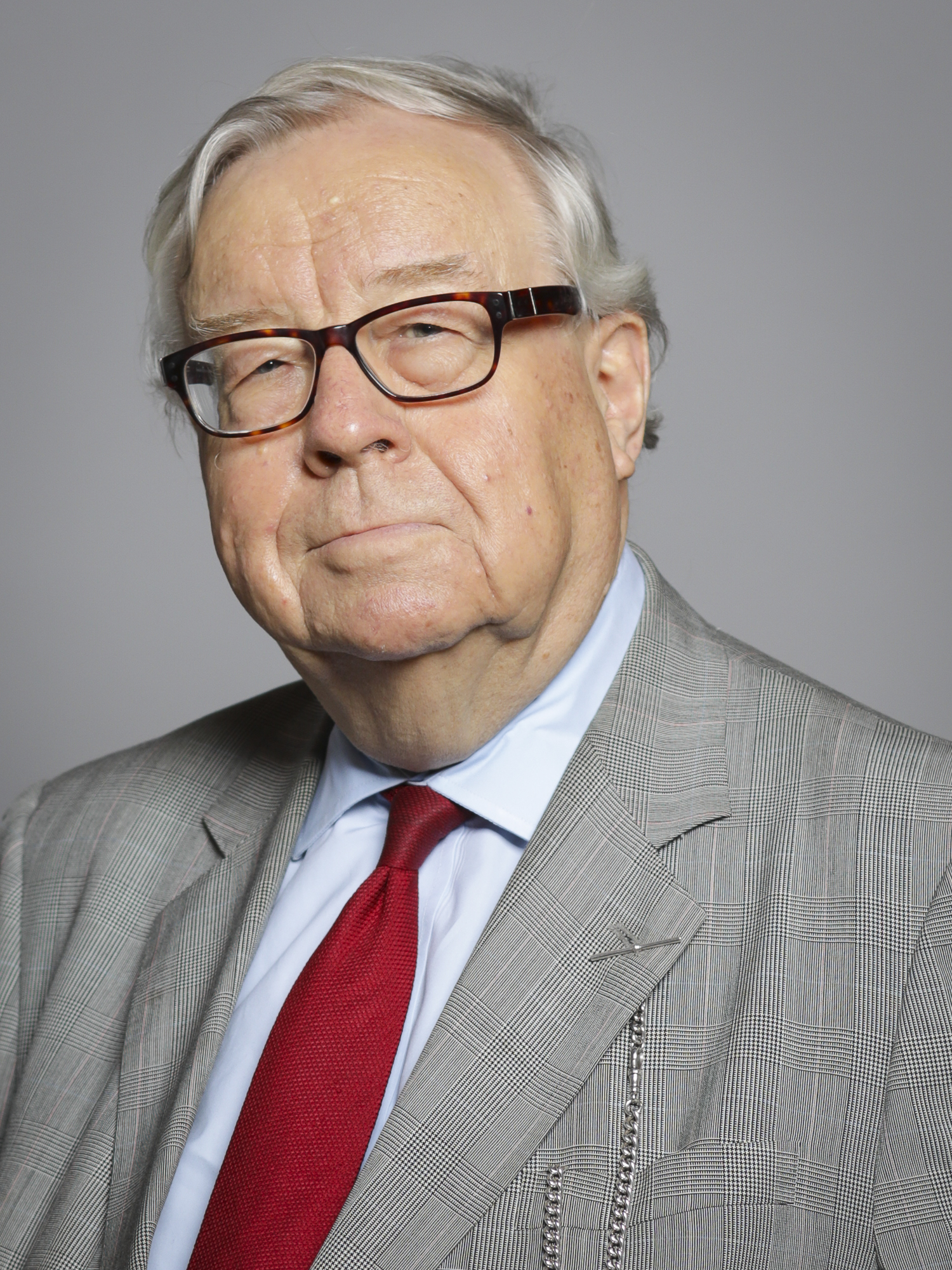
- Official portrait, 2019

Chair of the Northern Ireland Affairs Select Committee
- In office 14 July 2005 – 12 April 2010
- Preceded by: Michael Mates
- Succeeded by: Laurence Robertson

Shadow Deputy Leader of the House of Commons
- In office 20 June 1997 – 19 January 2000
- Leader: William Hague
- Preceded by: Gillian Shephard
- Succeeded by: James Cran

Shadow Minister for Constitutional Affairs
- In office 20 June 1997 – 19 January 2000
- Leader: William Hague

Member of the House of Lords
- Lord Temporal
- Life peerage 18 December 2010 – 25 February 2024

Member of Parliament
- In office 18 June 1970 – 12 April 2010
- Preceded by: Jennie Lee
- Succeeded by: Gavin Williamson
- Constituency: Cannock (1970–1974); South West Staffordshire (1974–1983); South Staffordshire (1983–2010)

Personal details
- Born: 18 May 1939 Grimsby, Lincolnshire, England
- Died: 25 February 2024 (aged 84) Lincoln, England
- Party: Conservative
- Spouse: Kathleen Mary MacDonald (m. 1967)
- Children: 2
- Education: St James's Choir School; Havelock School
- Alma mater: University of Hull

Patrick Thomas Cormack, Baron Cormack, DL, FSA, FRHistS (18 May 1939 – 25 February 2024) was a British politician, historian, journalist and author. He served as a member of Parliament (MP) for 40 years, from 1970 to 2010. Cormack was a member of the Conservative Party and was seen as a one-nation conservative.

Before entering Parliament, Cormack was a teacher. He was elected for Cannock at the 1970 general election. Following boundary changes he was elected for South West Staffordshire in 1974, renamed South Staffordshire in 1983. He was elected chair of the Northern Ireland Affairs Select Committee in 2005. He was also twice a candidate for the speakership of the House of Commons. After standing down from the House of Commons in 2010, he served as an active life peer in the House of Lords.

== Early life and career ==
Cormack was born to Thomas Charles Cormack, a local government officer and master mariner, and his wife Kathleen Mary Cormack in Grimsby just before the outbreak of the Second World War. He was educated locally at the St James's Choir School and the Havelock School, before attending the University of Hull, where he received a Bachelor of Arts degree in 1961.

Cormack was a teacher at his former school, St James's Choir School, in 1961. Cormack contested the safe Labour parliamentary seat of Bolsover at the 1964 general election, where he lost to the sitting MP Harold Neal, who won with a majority of 23,103 votes. At the 1966 general election, Cormack contested his hometown seat of Grimsby, but again was defeated, this time by the Secretary of State for Education and Science, Anthony Crosland, who had a majority of 8,126. Cormack became a training and education officer with Ross Ltd in 1966. In 1967, he was appointed an assistant house master at the Wrekin College in Wellington, Shropshire, for two years, after which he became the head of history at Brewood Grammar School in 1969.

Prior to 1970, Cormack was a member of the Bow Group and the Conservative Monday Club, resigning from both at the end of 1971.

== Parliamentary career ==
At the 1970 general election, Cormack stood for the seat of Cannock, and this time was elected, narrowly defeating the incumbent Labour MP Jennie Lee. Cormack won with a majority of 1,529.

From 1970 to 1973, Cormack served as a Parliamentary Private Secretary at the Department of Health and Social Security. He moved constituencies at the February 1974 general election, leaving the marginal seat of Cannock and instead contesting the adjacent newly drawn seat of South West Staffordshire, which he won comfortably with a majority of 9,758.

Cormack became chairman of the editorial board of The House magazine in 1976, and editor of the magazine in 1979.

Cormack was a member of the Education Select Committee for the duration of the 1979–83 Parliament.

An opponent to Prime Minister Margaret Thatcher's monetarist economic policies, in November 1981, with national unemployment approaching 3,000,000 (compared to 1,500,000 two years previously), Cormack urged Thatcher to change her government's policies if Britain was to avoid economic disaster.

In the 1983 general election, Cormack was elected to the renamed seat of South Staffordshire, covering a similar area to the former South West Staffordshire seat. In 1997, after 27 years as an MP on the backbenches, he was promoted by the then Leader of the Opposition, William Hague, to become the Shadow Deputy Leader of the House of Commons.

Cormack resigned from this position in early 2000, standing later that year for the position of Speaker of the House of Commons (following the retirement of Betty Boothroyd). However, he was unsuccessful in his bid for the speakership, with the House instead choosing Labour MP Michael Martin for the role. Cormack became life president of The House magazine in 2005. During the 2005–10 parliament, Cormack was the chairman of the Northern Ireland Affairs Select Committee.

The vote in South Staffordshire was postponed at the 2005 general election due to the death of the Liberal Democrat candidate Jo Harrison. When the election did take place on 23 June 2005, Cormack won comfortably. In February 2007, it was announced that Cormack had failed to win the re-adoption of his constituency party for the next general election. This vote was later declared invalid, for the number of votes recorded exceeded the number of people present at the meeting. In July 2007, the South Staffordshire Conservatives' executive council voted on the matter, but it resulted in a tie. Consequently, a vote of all local party members was held to decide whether Cormack should remain the party's candidate at the following general election. In the vote, held on 14 September, Cormack was readopted as the Conservative candidate, receiving the backing of over 75% of participating party members. Cormack expressed his gratitude and called the victory a "great relief". Subsequently, on 1 December 2009, Cormack announced his intention to stand down at the 2010 general election.

Although having a reputation as a serious parliamentarian, on occasions he was known for asking light hearted questions in the House of Commons, once simply asking Prime Minister Gordon Brown at Prime Minister's Questions what he wanted for Christmas.

Cormack was created a life peer on 18 December 2010, as Baron Cormack, of Enville in the County of Staffordshire. He sat on the Conservative benches in the House of Lords. Cormack opposed the Coalition's plans to reform the House of Lords, speaking out against them numerous times in the chamber.

Cormack was seen as a One Nation Tory. He was a Heathite, and was a frequent rebel under Margaret Thatcher – one of the so-called "wets".

== Other interests ==
Cormack took an active interest in historical issues, particularly those related to English Heritage. He was also a knowledgeable Parliamentary historian. He wrote many books on subjects ranging from the history of Parliament, British castles, English cathedrals, and a book on William Wilberforce.

Cormack was a trustee of the Churches Preservation Trust from 1972 until his death. He was a council member of British Archaeology since 1979, and was also a Liveryman of the Worshipful Company of Glaziers and Painters of Glass for the same length of time. From 1983 to 1993, he was Trustee on the Winston Churchill Memorial Trust. He was a consultant and adviser to FIRST, an international affairs organisation, since 1985. He was a vice-president of the Royal Stuart Society and the Heritage Crafts Association.

A committed Christian, Cormack was a rector's warden at Parliament's parish church, St Margaret's, Westminster, from 1978 to 1990. He was a longstanding Vice President of the National Churches Trust, as well as President of the Prayer Book Society for many years. Cormack also served as president of the British Association of Friends of Museums from 2023 until his death in 2024.

== Personal life and death ==
Cormack married Kathleen Mary MacDonald in 1967. They had two sons. He listed his recreations in Who's Who as "fighting philistines, walking, visiting old churches, avoiding sitting on fences". He was a member of the Athenaeum and Lincolnshire clubs. He was a longtime resident of Lincoln, living near its cathedral.

Lord Cormack died on 25 February 2024, at the age of 84. Among those who paid tribute to him were Prime Minister Rishi Sunak and the Leader of the Opposition (and future Prime Minister), Sir Keir Starmer.

== Honours ==
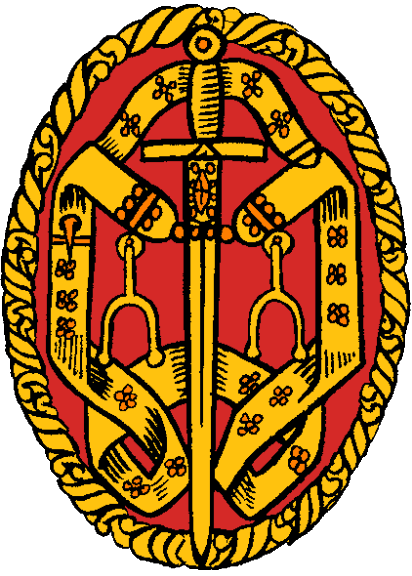
Insignia of a Knight Bachelor

- He was elected as a Fellow of the Society of Antiquaries of London (FSA) on 5 May 1978.
- He was made a Knight Bachelor in the 1995 New Years Honours List, for his service to Parliament.
- He became a Freeman of the City of London in 1980.
- He was elected as a Fellow of the Royal Historical Society (FRHistS) in 2010.
- He was elected as an Honorary Fellow of the Historical Association (FHA) in 2010.
- He was awarded the Honorary degree of Doctor of Letters (D.Litt.) by the University of Hull in 2010.
- He was appointed a deputy lieutenant (DL) for the County of Staffordshire on 11 April 2011.
- He was awarded the Honorary degree of Doctor of Laws (LL.D) by the Catholic University of America on 21 June 2013.
- He was awarded the Freedom of the City of Lincoln on 18 March 2022.

== Arms ==
Coat of arms of Patrick Cormack
Crest A demi-lion Vert winged and grasping in the dexter paw a quill Or. Escutcheon Per pale Or and Vert on a chevron between three cod bendwise sinister three portcullises chained each upper bar set with a Stafford Knot all counterchanged. Supporters On either side a goose Or that to the dexter holding in the beak a bluebonnet flower slipped Proper and that to the sinister holding in the beak a flax flower slipped Proper both resting the interior foot on a lamp with three flames Gules.

Parliament of the United Kingdom
Preceded by Jennie Lee	Member of Parliament for Cannock; 1970–1974	Succeeded by Gwilym Roberts
Constituency established	Member of Parliament for South West Staffordshire; 1974–1983	Constituency abolished
Constituency established	Member of Parliament for South Staffordshire; 1983–2010	Succeeded by Gavin Williamson
Political offices
Preceded by	Shadow Deputy Leader of the House of Commons; 1997–2000	Succeeded by James Cran
Preceded by	Shadow Minister for Constitutional Affairs; 1997–2000	Succeeded by
