= William Orme Foster =

William Orme Foster DL
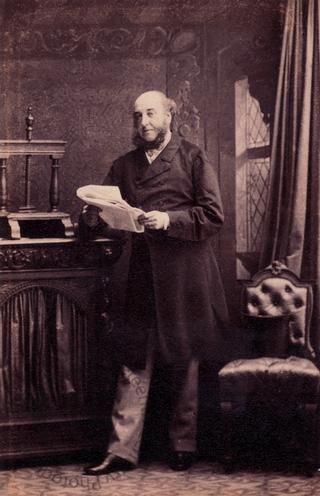
- Photograph of Foster, 1862

Member of Parliament for South Staffordshire
- In office 1857–1868 Serving with Henry Hodgetts-Foley
- Preceded by: Edward Littleton; Earl of Uxbridge
- Succeeded by: Constituency abolished

Personal details
- Born: 29 October 1814
- Died: 29 September 1899 (aged 84) Apley Hall, Shropshire
- Relations: James Foster (uncle)
- Children: William
- Parent(s): William Foster; Charlotte Orme
- Education: Shrewsbury School

William Orme Foster DL (29 October 1814 – 29 September 1899) was an English ironmaster, coalmaster and owner of the large industrial firm John Bradley & Co, which he inherited from his uncle, James Foster in 1853. He served as a Liberal MP for South Staffordshire from 1857 until 1868.

== Early life ==
He was born in 1814, the son of William Foster of Wordsley House in Stourbridge and his wife Charlotte, daughter of William Orme of Dulwich, Surrey. His father had an iron business in Stourbridge, a partnership with his brother-in-law trading as Foster & Orme; but it was as heir to his uncle James Foster that William Orme Foster was to achieve wealth and position as an ironmaster in the Midlands region of England.

Foster attended Shrewsbury School between 1826 and 1829. He was employed as an agent by his uncle before 1850. In 1852, he was appointed Deputy Lieutenant for Worcestershire. On James Foster's death in 1853, he inherited the bulk of his estate which was valued at £700,000. It included mines, ironworks, furnaces and engineering works situated at Stourbridge, Shropshire and in the Black Country region of England. The growth of his business was stimulated by booming railways, rails and other equipment being a major product of his works. In 1855, Foster bought the second version of Constable's painting The Lock for £860.

== Career ==
From 1857 until 1868 Foster served as a Member of Parliament for South Staffordshire. He was elected unopposed for this two-member constituency in 1857, 1859 and 1865. After boundary changes, he contested West Staffordshire in 1868, but came only third in the poll for the two-member constituency. In 1867, he was described as: "a Liberal; opposed to the ballot but in favour of a "large and comprehensive measure" of Parliamentary reform.

Other public offices held by Foster included High Sheriff for the County of Wexford in 1876, and High Sheriff for the County of Shropshire in 1883. In 1873 he served as treasurer of the Salop Infirmary in Shrewsbury.

In 1867 Foster bought the Apley Park estate near Bridgnorth in Shropshire, from Douglas Whitmore for over £300,000. The estate included most of Bridgnorth town. In 1873 as landowner he held in England 8,457 acres in Shropshire, 1,917 acres in Worcestershire and 874 acres in Staffordshire, besides 9,724 acres in County Wexford in Ireland.

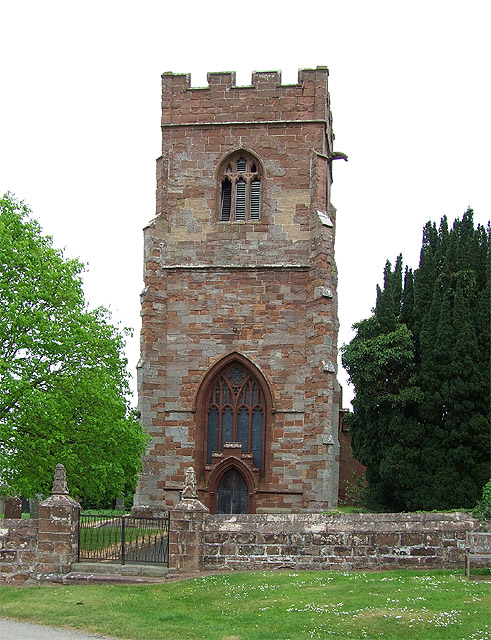
William Orme Foster was buried at St Chad's Church, Stockton

Under Foster the industrial enterprises such as John Bradley & Co, inherited from his uncle, continued to prosper, the 1860s being particularly good years. John Bradley & Co became one of the largest iron manufacturers in the Midlands, producing wrought iron by the traditional puddling process. However, soon after his loss at the West Staffordshire election of 1868, Foster suffered a "paralytic seizure" which weakened his health and, for many years, he left business affairs with his wife and with his eldest son. From the 1870s onwards, profits from the business declined as steel manufacturers competed with wrought iron producers and the final decades of the century brought a gradual contraction of iron output. In 1884, Foster attempted unsuccessfully to sell John Bradley & Co. In the same year, he donated the early steam locomotive Agenoria, which had once served his ironworks and mines at Shut End, to the Science Museum (London).

== Personal life ==
In 1843 Foster married Isabella Grazebrook (d. 1910), a daughter of Henry Grazebrook of Liverpool. Together, they had two sons and four daughters, including:

- Charlotte Foster (c. 1845–1915), who married Hector Stewart Vandeleur, son of Col. Crofton Moore Vandeleur and Lady Grace Graham-Toler (a daughter of the 2nd Earl of Norbury), in 1867.
- William Henry Foster (1846–1924), who married Henrietta Grace Mahon, daughter of Henry Sandford Pakenham Mahon of Strokestown House, in 1874.
- Julia Mary Foster (1860–1931), who married, as her first husband, Hon. Hugh Tyrwhitt, a son of Harriet Tyrwhitt, 12th Baroness Berners.

Foster died at Apley Hall on 29 September 1899, aged 84, and was buried on 5 October at Stockton. His estate was probated at £2,588,000, and he left his fortune to his son William.

=== Descendants ===
Through his daughter Julia, he was a grandfather of the composer Gerald Tyrwhitt-Wilson, 14th Baron Berners.

Parliament of the United Kingdom
Preceded by Edward Littleton; Earl of Uxbridge	Member of Parliament for South Staffordshire; 1857–1868; With: Henry Hodgetts-Foley	Constituency abolished
Honorary titles
Preceded by John Manly Arbuthnot Keane, 3rd Baron Keane	High Sheriff of Wexford; 1876	Succeeded by James Walter Milles Stopford, 6th Earl of Courtown
Preceded by James Jenkinson Bibby	High Sheriff of Shropshire; 1883	Succeeded by Charles John Morris
