= Henry Hodgetts-Foley =

British MP

Henry John Wentworth Hodgetts-Foley of Prestwood House, then in Kingswinford parish (9 December 1828 – 23 April 1894) was a British MP.

He was the son of John Hodgetts Hodgetts-Foley and a descendant of General Thomas Gage and Margaret Kemble, and it is through Kemble that he is a descendant of the Schuyler family, the Van Cortlandt family, and the Delancey family from colonial British North America.

He represented South Staffordshire in Parliament from 1857–1868. He inherited the Prestwood estate in Kinver (also partly then in Kingswinford parish) from his father in 1861. He was appointed High Sheriff of Staffordshire in 1877. His estate by the 1880s generated close to £7000 a year.

He married Jane Frances Anne Vivian, the daughter of the first Lord Vivian. Their son Paul Henry Foley (19 March 1857 –21 January 1928) inherited the Stoke Edith estate in Herefordshire on the death in 1900 of his great-aunt by marriage Lady Emily Foley, the widow of Edward Thomas Foley. The whole of the Prestwood estate and a substantial portion of the Stoke Edith estate were sold by Paul by auction in 1913 and 1919. Sir John Paul Foley is a grandson of Paul.

Parliament of the United Kingdom
Preceded by Edward Littleton; Earl of Uxbridge	Member of Parliament for South Staffordshire; 1857–1868; With: William Orme Foster	Constituency abolished
Honorary titles
Preceded by Richard Holt Briscoe	High Sheriff of Staffordshire; 1877	Succeeded by Sir John Hardy, Bt
