= Henry Paget, 3rd Marquess of Anglesey =

British peer and politician

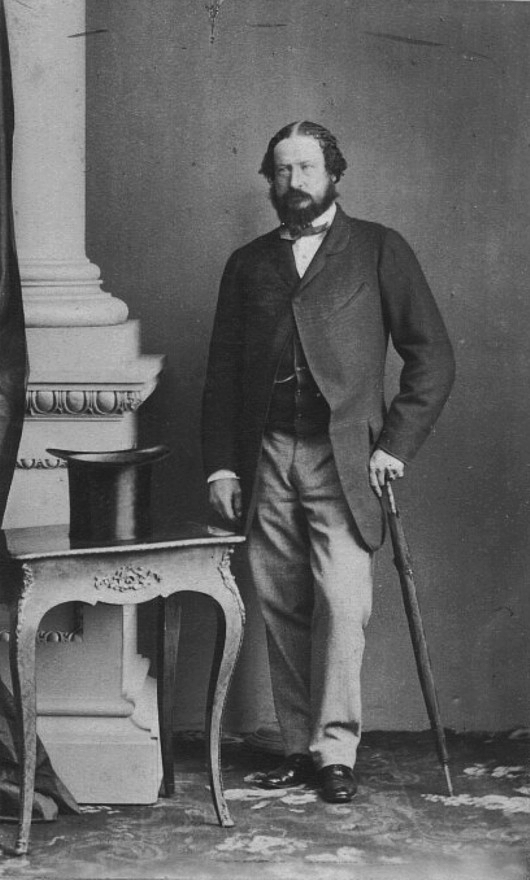
- The Marquess in the late 1850s.

Member of Parliament for Staffordshire South
- In office 1854-1857

Personal details
- Born: 9 December 1821
- Died: 30 January 1880 (aged 58) Westminster, England
- Party: Liberal Party
- Spouse: Sophia Eversfield (m. 1845)
- Parent: Henry Paget (father)
- Relatives: Henry Paget (half-brother); Henry Paget (grandfather); Caroline Campbell (grandmother); John Campbell (grandfather); Lady Charlotte Bury (grandmother)
- Military career
- Branch: British Army
- Rank: Captain
- Commands: Anglesey Troop; Grenadier Guards

Henry William George Paget, 3rd Marquess of Anglesey (9 December 1821 – 30 January 1880), styled Lord Paget until 1854 and Earl of Uxbridge between 1854 and 1869, was a British peer and Liberal politician.

== Background ==
Anglesey was the only son of Henry Paget, 2nd Marquess of Anglesey, by his first wife Eleanora, daughter of Colonel John Campbell.

== Military career ==
He was appointed as Captain of the Burton-on-Trent Troop of the part-time Staffordshire Yeomanry on 26 March 1839. The following year he obtained permission for the troop to be renamed the Anglesey Troop. On 21 May 1841 he purchased a commission in the Grenadier Guards as Ensign & Lieutenant. He sold his commission and retired on 23 May 1845.

== Political career ==
Anglesey was returned to Parliament as one of two representatives for Staffordshire South in 1854, a seat he held until 1857. In 1869 he succeeded his father in the marquessate and entered the House of Lords.

== Personal life ==
On 7 June 1845 in her home parish of Horsham, he married Sophia Eversfield, born 24 June 1819, the daughter of James Eversfield, of Denne Park, and his wife Mary Crew, daughter of Robert Hawgood Crew. There were no children from the marriage. He died in Westminster on 30 January 1880, aged 58, and was succeeded by his half-brother, Lord Henry Paget. His widow moved to Fordingbridge and later to Tunbridge Wells, where she died on 7 December 1901.

Parliament of the United Kingdom
Preceded by Viscount Lewisham; Hon. Edward Littleton	Member of Parliament for Staffordshire South; 1854–1857; With: Hon. Edward Littleton	Succeeded by William Orme Foster; Henry Hodgetts-Foley
Peerage of the United Kingdom
Preceded by Henry Paget	Marquess of Anglesey; 1869–1880	Succeeded by Henry Paget
