= Ludovic Porter =

British administrator in India

Sir Ludovic Porter KCSI, KCIE, OBE
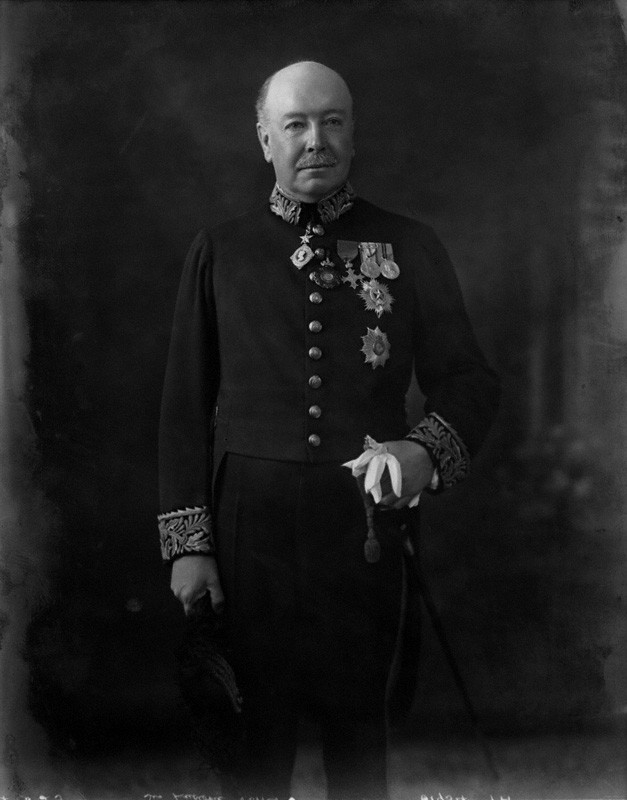
- Sir Ludovic Charles Porter in 1923
- Born: 1869; Dawlish, Devon, England
- Died: 9 March 1928 (aged 58–59); Stratford-upon-Avon, Warwickshire, England
- Education: Trinity College, Cambridge
- Occupation: Civil servant
- Employer: Indian Civil Service

Sir Ludovic Charles Porter, KCSI, KCIE, OBE (1869–1928) was a senior British administrator in India.

== Life ==
He was the second son of Ludovic Porter (1836–1904), owner of sugar plantations in British Guiana, and his wife Maria (1835–1901), youngest daughter of the Reverend George Hole (1798–1859), rector of Chulmleigh, and his wife Jane (1800–1864), daughter of Robert Hawgood Crew.

Educated at Eton College and Trinity College, Cambridge, Porter entered the Indian Civil Service in 1887, becoming in 1890 Secretary of the Education Department of the Government of India. From 1911 to 1915 he was a Member of the Council of the Governor-General of India and from 1920 a Member of Council for the United Provinces. In 1922 he was Acting Governor of the United Provinces.

== Honours ==
In addition to being made a Companion of the Order of the Star of India in the 1916 New Year Honours and an Officer of the Order of the British Empire in the 1920 New Year Honours, he was awarded two knighthoods, first in the 1921 New Year Honours as a Knight Commander of the Order of the Indian Empire and secondly in the 1923 New Year Honours as a Knight Commander of the Order of the Star of India.

== Legacy ==
He died unmarried and his will was proved in London on 18 April 1928 by his nephew Ludovic Ernest Porter, effects being 415 pounds (worth about 22,000 pounds in 2014). Portraits of him are in the National Portrait Gallery and some of his correspondence is held at King's College, Cambridge.
