= Edward Littleton, 1st Baron Hatherton =

British politician (1791–1863)

The Right Honourable The Lord Hatherton PC
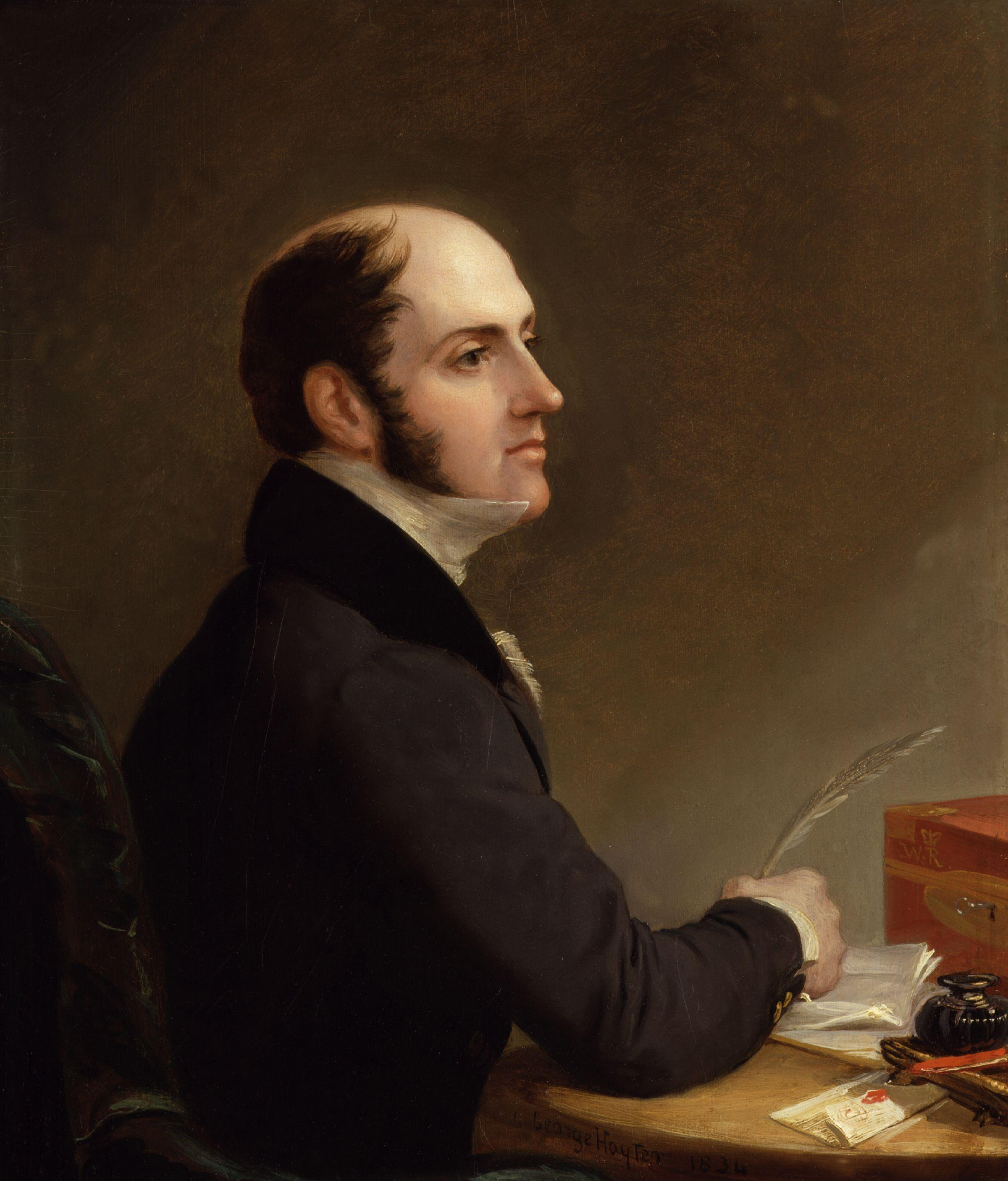
- An 1834 portrait of Edward Littleton by George Hayter.

Chief Secretary for Ireland
- In office May 1833 – 14 November 1834
- Monarch: William IV
- Prime Minister: The Earl Grey; The Viscount Melbourne
- Preceded by: Sir John Hobhouse, Bt
- Succeeded by: Sir Henry Hardinge

Personal details
- Born: 18 March 1791
- Died: 4 May 1863 (aged 72) Teddesley Hall, Staffordshire
- Party: Tory; Whig
- Spouse: Hyacinthe Wellesley
- Children: 4, including Edward
- Education: Brasenose College, Oxford

Edward John Littleton, 1st Baron Hatherton PC, FRS (18 March 1791 – 4 May 1863), was a British politician from the extended Littleton/Lyttelton family, of first the Canningite Tories and later the Whigs. He had a long political career, active in each of the Houses of Parliament in turn over a period of forty years. He was closely involved in a number of major reforms, particularly Catholic emancipation, the Truck Act 1831, the Parliamentary Boundaries Act 1832 and the Municipal Corporations Act 1835. Throughout his career he was actively concerned with the Irish question and he was Chief Secretary for Ireland between 1833 and 1834.

Hatherton was also a major Staffordshire landowner, farmer and businessman. As heir to two family fortunes, he had large holdings in agricultural and residential property, coal mines, quarries and brick works, mainly concentrated around Penkridge, Cannock and Walsall.

== Background and education ==
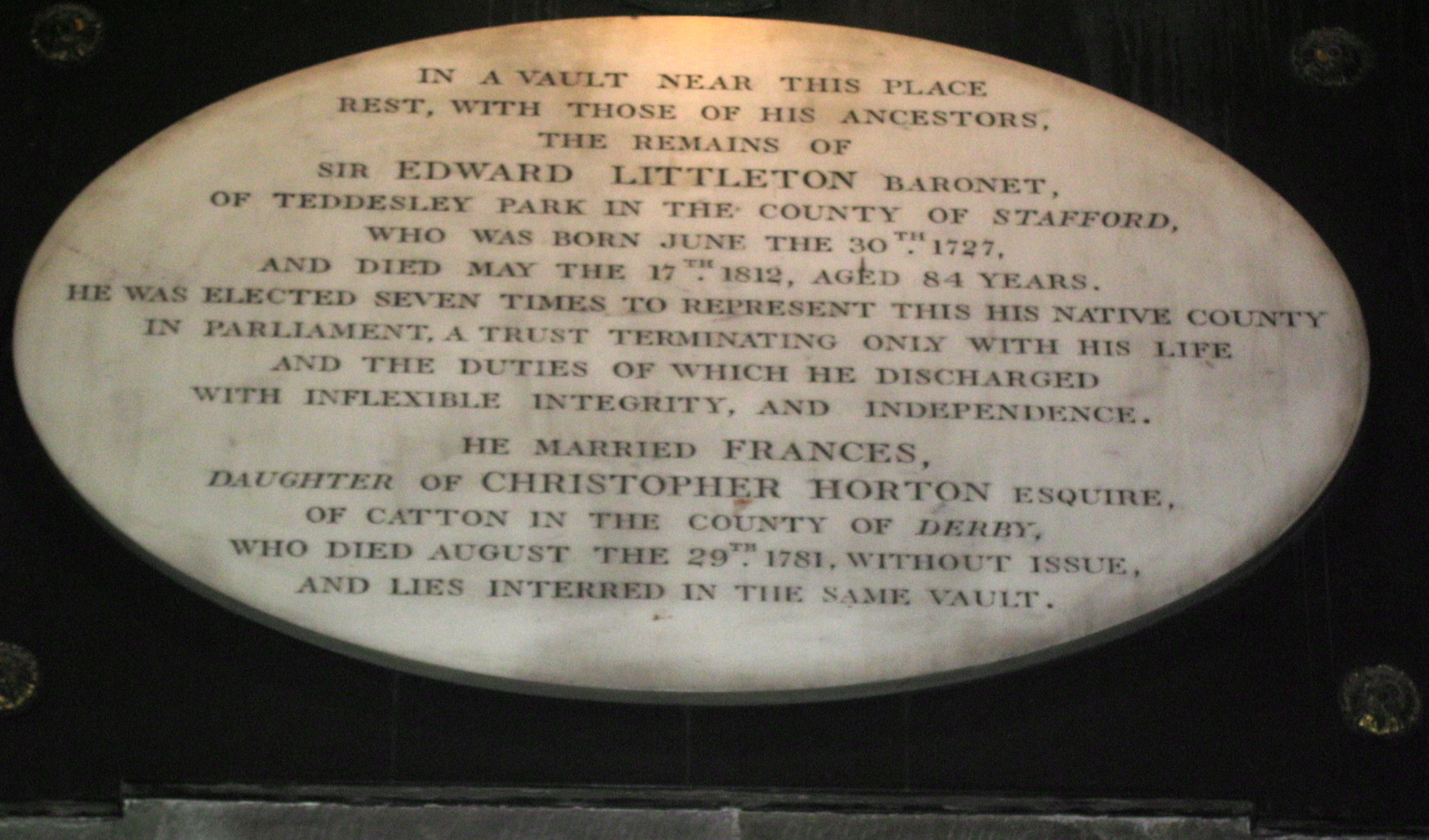
Memorial to Sir Edward Littleton, the 4th and last baronet, who died without issue in 1812, leaving the estates to his great-nephew. St. Michael and All Angels, Penkridge.

Littleton was born Edward Walhouse, and was educated at Rugby and at Brasenose College, Oxford. In 1812, he took the name of Littleton to inherit the large landed estates of his great-uncle Sir Edward Littleton, 4th and last of the Littleton Baronets, of Teddesley Hall, near Penkridge, Staffordshire. In 1835, he also inherited large mineral and manufacturing interests in Walsall and Cannock from his uncle, Edward Walhouse.

== Career ==
=== Political career, 1812–1833 ===
Littleton also took over his great-uncle's parliamentary seat. From 1812 to 1832, he was Member of Parliament for Staffordshire and then was the MP for the southern division of that county until 1835. He spent most of that time as a Canningite Tory, but moved over to the Whigs after George Canning's death in 1827.

In the House of Commons, Littleton was especially prominent as an advocate of Roman Catholic emancipation. In 1825, as a preliminary to a Catholic Relief Bill promoted by Daniel O'Connell, he introduced an Elective Franchise in Ireland Bill. The objective of this was, paradoxically, to raise the property qualification for Irish voters. However, its underlying aim was to end abuse of a distinctively Irish form of freehold, which had to be renewed by payment to the original landlord, and so allowed large landowners to create large numbers of compliant voters. Both the Relief and the Franchise Bills failed. After crossing the floor of the House to join the Whigs in 1827, Littleton voted for the Catholic emancipation Bill that finally became law in 1829.

From this point, the style and content of his contributions changed completely. For almost twenty years he had been content generally to make short contributions, usually delivering himself of his considered opinions or changed notions (for he sometimes altered his initial stance during debate) in the chamber of the house in a few unmemorable phrases. From 1830 he became closely involved in committee work on important reforms. As his opinions became more radical, he adopted an increasingly trenchant and discursive style, speaking frequently in long, argued statements, laden with factual detail. On one day in September 1831, for example, he made eight speeches of varying length in the House. One of the important factors in this change of style and focus seems to have been his increasingly close contact with middle and working class opinion in the growing Staffordshire towns – Stoke on Trent, Wolverhampton and Walsall. He frequently presented petitions and deployed arguments and reports drawn directly from these disfranchised towns and people. As he became more combative and forensic in his contributions, he was increasingly regarded as a Radical rather than merely a Whig.

After the 1830 General Election ended Tory domination, and brought in a minority Whig government under Earl Grey, Littleton took up the campaign against the truck system. This was the practice by which employees were forced to accept payment or advances in kind, often becoming effectively enslaved to the company store. First he presented numerous petitions against the system from workers in Staffordshire and Gloucestershire. He asked and obtained leave to introduce a bill against the truck system at the end of the year. The 1831 general election completely changed the electoral landscape, ushering in a reforming Whig ministry under Grey, and allowing Littleton to proceed with his bill with a fair certainty of success. Moving the vote on the bill in September 1831, he pointed out that "it was notorious that the universal feeling of the working classes was in favour of some attempt to put down this odious system." He summarised its main purpose simply as that "the workmen must be paid in money." Consolidating and extending numerous earlier acts on the subject, the Truck Act 1831 (actually the Money Payment of Wages Act) was a landmark piece of social legislation, which was invoked as still relevant in Parliament as recently as 2003.

The campaign for the Truck Act had revealed an important weakness in Littleton's character that was to have major consequences for his career. To get the reform through, he had made the concession that Ireland be excluded from it for the time being. At one point he had let slip the unguarded comment that he did not care about Ireland. This was overheard by one of the members for Waterford – presumably Lord George Beresford, who was hated by the Radicals and Irish Repealers, and who proceeded to broadcast the remark. Littleton took up the challenge in Parliament and, accepting that the report of his comment was accurate, pointed out that it was reported entirely out of context. In fact, it was well known that he had been a strong proponent of Emancipation. However, the damage was done.

As the Truck Act passed into Law, Littleton was drafted into detailed work on the Great Reform Bill, intended to create an entirely new system of parliamentary representation. The reform had two main thrusts: a simplification of the Franchise qualification and a complete redrawing of the Constituency boundaries to abolish the rotten boroughs and pocket boroughs. Littleton was appointed as an unpaid Commissioner on the latter task. Here his command of detail and forensic skills found a perfect outlet, as the reform involved careful research, the establishment of principles and their application to hundreds of varying local situations. He was determined that the reform should be based on the latest data about population sizes, not on the traditional status of settlements. He was formidably well informed and often sarcastic in debate, often tangling with John Wilson Croker, a bitterly anti-Reform Irish Tory who sat for the rotten borough of Aldeburgh. In his first major contribution in Committee, he said in reply to an ill-informed remark by Croker that: "his right hon. friend had displayed his want of acquaintance with the county of Stafford when he spoke of the village of Bilston. The village of Bilston, as his right hon. friend was facetiously pleased to style it, contained a population of not less than 14,000 or 15,000 souls.". He made similar contributions to uphold the importance of Wolverhampton, Walsall and Stoke, continually insisting on the principle that constituencies should represent communities and populations, not political or economic interests. He consistently appealed simultaneously to principles and facts, showing a ferocious interest in every region of the country, for example: "as one of the Commissioners upon whom was devolved the duty of fixing the limits of the new borough of Huddersfield, he felt himself called upon to state that, in performing that duty, he did not conceive himself bound to consider the extent of property which any individual might possess within the borough, or his political opinions." Ultimately, the Reform Bill as originally conceived proved unwieldy, and the boundary reform, with its mass of detail and numerous schedules was divided off into a second bill. Hence the "Reform Act 1832" is really two separate acts: a Representation of the People Act 1832 and the Parliamentary Boundaries Act 1832, which owed much of its effectiveness to Littleton's work.

It is some measure of the regard in which he was held by parliamentary Radicals that in the Speaker election of January 1833, against his own wish, he was nominated by the Scottish MP Joseph Hume to become Speaker of the first reformed House of Commons. He was seconded by Daniel O'Connell himself. Littleton spoke against his own nomination, expressing his confidence in the existing Speaker, Charles Manners-Sutton, a Tory member, and praising his "unexampled patience and urbanity". Littleton had voted for Manners-Sutton consistently since 1817. He correctly diagnosed his own nomination as a political protest and he did not consider the Speakership a party matter. O'Connell countered with a long speech denouncing Toryism, demanding a triumphal vindication of the Reform Act and refusing to withdraw the nomination. He regarded the nomination of Manners-Sutton "as another instance of that paltry truckling on the part of the present Administration towards their ancient enemies, which had already afforded such frequent subjects of complaint." Lord Althorp, a fellow Radical, supported Littleton's non-partisan view but William Cobbett gave a bitterly partisan speech, claiming that the election of Manners-Sutton would be "an open declaration of war against the people of England." Much of the venom derived from an accompanying proposal to pay the Speaker a large pension. However, Manners-Sutton himself rose to reject the idea of a pension. A division was held on the proposal install Littleton in the chair and it was defeated by 241 votes to 31: Littleton did not vote for himself. Littleton's nomination, though rejected by himself, had initiated an important constitutional debate, which established permanently in the reformed parliament the non-partisan character of the Speaker.

=== Military career 1814–1833 ===
He was commissioned as Major of the part-time Staffordshire Yeomanry on 11 July 1814 and was promoted to Lieutenant-Colonel on 27 September 1819. He was appointed Lt-Col Commandant on 17 December 1829, but resigned the command in August 1833 after he became Chief Secretary for Ireland.

=== Chief Secretary for Ireland, 1833–1834 ===
In May 1833 Littleton became chief secretary to the Lord Lieutenant of Ireland in the ministry of Earl Grey, with Richard Wellesley, 1st Marquess Wellesley, Littleton's father-in-law, as Lord Lieutenant. The appointments met with the approval of Daniel O'Connell. However, Littleton was part of a shaky coalition of Whigs and Radicals. The Whigs were much more concerned with defending property rights and the position of the established church than the Radicals, who were prepared to sacrifice both if they perceived injustice. He was often forced to take positions which might normally have gone against his political instincts, and he also allowed his loose tongue to get him into further trouble.

The main point of conflict was the issue of Irish Tithes. Incensed by the legal requirement to pay tithes to the Protestant Church of Ireland, the Repealers had launched a campaign of refusal to pay among the mainly Catholic (otherwise Presbyterian) peasantry. This sporadically flared into violence in the Tithe War. Littleton was compelled by the alliance with Whigs to bring in a Tithe Arrears (Ireland) Bill, which set out some concessions in the payment terms but reaffirmed the government's determination to impose tithes on Ireland for the foreseeable future. It was accompanied by one of the many Irish Coercion bills which partially suspended civil rights in Ireland to suppress rural violence.

Initially, Littleton seemed to be steering a compromise course fairly successfully. On the one hand he portrayed the recovery of tithes as a painful necessity, while denouncing unwarranted and sometimes illegal police violence. However, this could not last. As early as 10 July, Littleton upset the Irish Repealers in the Commons. Feargus O'Connor, one of the most radical of the Irish party, brought forward a petition demanding the repeal of the Acts of Union 1800. Littleton responded that: "That was a proposition so utterly devoid of commonsense, that it was scarcely necessary for him to say, that when it was brought forward, it would be met by the most strenuous opposition. He need scarcely use such strong language, for the proposition was so extremely absurd – so opposed to the feelings and interests of both Englishmen and Irishmen, that any strenuous exertion would be totally unnecessary, in order to ensure it a signal defeat." This was clearly far beyond what was necessary to dissociate himself from O'Connor.

However, there was no real chance of repeal going through at that point. Rather hastily he made a compact with O'Connell on the assumption that the new coercion act could not contain certain repressive clauses which were part of the old act. The clauses, however, were inserted; O'Connell charged Littleton with deception; and in July 1834 Grey, Viscount Althorp and the Irish secretary resigned. The two latter were induced to serve under the new premier, Lord Melbourne, and they remained in office until Melbourne was dismissed in November 1834.

=== Career in House of Lords, 1835–1863 ===
In February 1835, Littleton won re-election to the House of Commons as member for Staffordshire Southern – part of a Whig victory that returned Melbourne to power. Shortly afterwards, the new administration raised Littleton to the peerage as Baron Hatherton, of Hatherton in the County of Stafford. Hatherton took his title from a Staffordshire village which at that time was an exclave of Wolverhampton, where Littleton owned Hatherton Hall, a country house that formed part of the Walhouse inheritance. Since he was now constitutionally barred from serving as a member of the House of Commons, his seat had to be contested again in a by-election in May, won by a fellow Whig, Sir Francis Goodricke.

As a peer, Hatherton was automatically a member of the House of Lords and able to make a contribution to parliamentary debate and processes. This he did until the year before his death, although his contributions tailed off considerably after his Address in Answer to the Speech from the Throne in 1847, perhaps for family reasons.

For several years after his elevation to the peerage, Hatherton was closely involved in campaigns to extend the political reforms of the Whig administration. Most important of these initially was municipal reform. Hatherton presented numerous petitions, and took up the cause of several small towns, in the campaign preceding the Municipal Corporations Act 1835. He served on the Lords committee on the bill and was often acerbic in debate, much as he had been on earlier reforms. Key to the measure was the enfranchisement of ratepayers. When the Tory peers rallied to the cause of the freemen, a rather flexible class who dominated the electorate in many towns and cities, Hatherton observed caustically that:

the freemen, generally speaking, were a very inferior class of persons. They need not possess any property, or pay any rates; and in many instances, their residence was principally in gaols. To show the facilities which they afforded for corruption, the noble Lord read various statements of the vast number of persons who had been admitted as freemen just previous to general elections. For such persons the Bill proposed to substitute a class of men who had paid rates for three years. If their Lordships refused to sanction this proposition, he was afraid they would expose themselves to strong observations out of doors, where it was the universal opinion that they had found the class of individuals which the Bill tended to get rid of extremely convenient, and easily to be managed on certain occasions.

When a similar measure was proposed for Ireland in 1838, Hatherton defended it trenchantly in the Lords, taking particular exception to attempts to tamper with the franchise. In a substantial, detailed speech he used his old tactic of marshalling demographic and financial detail to swamp rhetorical argument. Everywhere he perceived possible corruption, he entered his name in the lists against it. So in 1837, for example, we find his name among the six radical Lords wanting to pursue an urgent enquiry into the statutes of the Oxbridge colleges, on the grounds, among others, that the colleges were "of very ancient foundation, and many of their statutes, contemplating a state of society very different from the present, and a religion other than that now established, are totally inapplicable to the present times, and impossible to be observed."

Another cause was the struggle against the Church Rate, the compulsory levy for maintenance of Anglican parish churches that so offended both Catholic and Protestant Dissenters. The Church Rate agitation was part of a wider campaign for reforms of position of the established Church, which broke its monopoly over the recording of births, marriages and deaths in 1837, but poor rates were not made voluntary until 1868, five years after Hatherton's death. In fact, after this disappointment, and especially in the early 1840s, a period of Tory dominance that brought Robert Peel to power, Hatherton's contributions slackened for a time in number and in focus. Without a clear programme of government reforms to promote, he tended to moralise or equivocate.

Hatherton was always a zealous promoter of Lord's Day observance, a cause which united almost all the churches. Both Hatherton and his ecclesiastical allies were at least as concerned with the hours and conditions of the workers as with due decorum on a day of worship. Hatherton presented many petitions on the subject in the 1830s and in 1840 he focussed his attention on the demand for a law to stop Sunday traffic on the canals and railways. Hatherton had a major economic interest in canals, and the Hatherton Canal was only part of the network that served his mines and quarries in Staffordshire. He sought legislation to impose a solution on the canal owners, who would not agree among themselves to a holiday for their workers. This issue preoccupied him for the next two years, gradually shading into arguments about working conditions more generally.

Hatherton made a number of important speeches in the period leading up to Mines and Collieries Act 1842. As a coal-owner, his economic interests were even more closely involved than in the case of the canals. His economic liberalism was thus brought into conflict with his zeal for social reform. A Commission, headed by Lord Anthony Ashley-Cooper, 7th Earl of Shaftesbury, had investigated conditions in the mines and its proposals for reform included prohibitions on female and child labour underground. Hatherton found himself in the unusual and uncomfortable position of defending the status quo alongside Charles Vane, 3rd Marquess of Londonderry, a Tory grandee hated in the mining areas of Northumberland and Durham. However, Hatherton claimed that conditions in the Midland coal mining areas were much better than in the north and portrayed the miners as an aristocracy of labour, with the child labourers as "apprentices". Partly through his intransigence, the age lower limit for boys to work underground was set at ten. On the other hand, Hatherton welcomed a ban on women working in the mines and defended against all attempts to dilute it.

The Railway Mania of the 1840s saw Littleton trying to get to grips with the pace of modernisation. Early in 1845 he spoke at length in support of a petition from the Staffordshire and Worcestershire Canal Company, attacking predatory pricing by railways. A little later he encouraged people affected by railway development to group together in corporate bodies to defend their joint interests. and speaking in defence of the coastal trade in coal. The following year, however, he was showing a very positive attitude and was advocating a streamlined system for dealing with railway development. In fact, he had informed himself sufficiently to hazard the opinion that broad gauge was the future.

Proposed changes to the Game Act 1831 (1 & 2 Will. 4. c. 32) also gave him a chance to advertise himself as a modern and improving landlord. He proposed removing hares from the status of game, so that tenants might eliminate them from their land and boasted of his near-extermination of hares and rabbits on his own estates: "he could scarcely exaggerate the satisfaction which had resulted from that course, both to himself and to his tenants."

However, the Irish Question was again coming to dominated debate and it had never ceased to be one of Hatherton's major concerns. During the 1830s he had spoken often on Irish matters, steering a tortuous path. On the one hand he supported most of the causes of equality and social reform dear to Irish nationalists. In 1836, for example, we find him defending the suppression of Orange lodges and denouncing the poor representation of Catholics on public bodies. However, he also supported coercive Government measures to suppress disorder, often taking a hardline position. In 1844 Hatherton promoted a reform popular with Irish Catholics: the Charitable Bequests (Ireland) Act, which created a corporate body to accept bequests in favour of the Irish clergy. In so doing, he seized the opportunity to attack the poor provision for Catholic clerical education. This helped stoke the agitation that led to the Maynooth Grant of 1845, with its disastrously divisive consequences for the Tory party.

However, the disaster of the Great Famine soon pushed even these important issues to the periphery. Peel recognised that the famine could not be ended while the Corn Laws, major protective tariffs on food imports, continued in force. Although it had never dominated Hatherton's radicalism, he had long been loyal to the anti-Corn Law cause and had spoken most effectively on the subject when he presented no less than six petitions from Wolverhampton in 1839 There was never any doubt of his support for the repeal of the laws in 1846, a volte-face for the Tory party that split it more disastrously and more permanently than Maynooth and brought down Peel's government. The minority Whig government of John Russell, 1st Earl Russell dealt with the famine, as closely as possible according to laissez-faire principles, through the administrator Charles Trevelyan. He was so preoccupied with a market solution that he restricted relief through public works and forced millions to starve or emigrate.

From August 1846, Parliament was continuously prorogued and the government avoided facing its critics. As 1847 began, the government was forced to think again, and decided to bring in soup kitchens and outdoor relief. Parliament was reconvened on 19 January and the government's revised strategy sketchily outlined to in Speech from the Throne that gave Ireland prominence but wandered across such topics as the marriage of the Spanish Infanta, and problems in Poland and Argentina. As a senior Whig peer, Hatherton rose to make a formal Address in Answer. He immediately stated that the condition of Ireland was topic of "all-absorbing importance" and went on to give a long speech in which all other matters were relegated to a formal mention at the end. He stressed the vast scale of famine and the inadequacy of government attempts to tackle it. He welcomed public works programmes but declared that if they were now pointless or impractical, other means of relieving the famine had to be found. Hatherton stated that his purpose was to "implore their Lordships, in considering this question, to make the case of Ireland their own" and demanded the government treat it exactly as if it had happened in England. He asked the peers to consider what would have been their response if some pest had destroyed England's cotton imports: would they leave Manchester to its own devices? He demanded abolition of all residual restrictions on food imports. The government was proposing to finance relief from future taxes on Ireland. Hatherton rejected this explicitly. What would be the response to a famine in England: would Parliament really expect English landlords to pay thee entire cost of relief. Hatherton made clear that he was not speaking on the government's behalf:

These remarks emanated solely from himself, and had not been made at the suggestion of any party; but he could not have undertaken the duty of proposing the Address to the Crown, unless he had been allowed free license to express his own opinions. Whatever might be the issue of this fearful calamity, one thing was certain, and that was, that it was the bounden duty of all parties, both in England and Ireland, from the highest Minister of the Crown, down to the lowest member of society, to combine, and by every exertion, and by every personal sacrifice, if necessary, to do all in their power to arrest the fearful progress of this giant evil. Let them reflect what would have been the condition of England if the Channel had not existed between the two countries. The consequence to England would then have been as dire as if the calamity had occurred in England itself.

His speech, which had departed far from the usual formal paean to the monarch's words and criticised the central pillar of government policy, elicited considerable outrage. It was the peak of his career as a working peer. From this point, his contributions became briefer and less frequent. This roughly corresponds to the onset of important family bereavements. Hyacinth Anne, his daughter had died in July 1847 after a long struggle against tuberculosis. His wife, Hyacinthe Mary, too became seriously ill, dying at the beginning of 1849. Hatherton served as Lord Lieutenant of Staffordshire between 1854 and 1863—an honorific local post with considerable ceremonial duties that perhaps filled his time as he himself became less able to travel. His last contribution to debate, in 1852, was characteristically trenchant attack on the arrogance of the telegraph companies who inconvenienced residents without notice, and a demand that they pay compensation.

== Business and property interests ==
Hatherton was a very wealthy man, partly because of his inherited interests, and partly because of his own business activities. The Littleton inheritance brought almost the whole of the manor of Penkridge, as well as the former Penkridge deanery manor, and other estates in that area – land accruing in the hands of the Littletons since 1502. The Walhouse inheritance brought large coal mines in Cannock and Walsall, as well as extractive works supplying the construction industry, including sandstone and limestone quarries, brickyards, gravel pits and sand pits. This made him immensely influential as a landlord and employer across a large tract of south and central Staffordshire.

A listing of his economic interests in 1862, the year before his death, includes:

- Teddesley Hall, Woods and Farm; Hatherton Hall, Pillaton Gardens, Teddesley and Hatherton Estate Rentals – all in his own occupation
- 288 holdings in the following townships: Abbots Bromley, Acton Trussell, Bednall, Beaudesert and Longdon, Bosoomoor, Congreve, Coppenhall, Cannock, Drayton, Dunston, Huntington, Hatherton, Linell, Levedale, Longridge, Otherton, Pipe Ridware, Penkridge, Pillaton, Preston, Stretton, Saredon and Shareshill, Teddesley, Water Eaton, Wolgarston
- Walsall Estate Rental
- 236 holdings, in Walsall
- Royalties from mineral extraction at Hatherton Colliery, Bloxwich; Hatherton Colliery, Great Wyrley; Serjeants Hill Colliery, Walsall; Hatherton Lime Works, Walsall; Walsall Old Lime Works; Paddock Brickyard, Walsall; Sutton Road Brickyard, Walsall; Serjeants Hill Brickyard, Walsall; Butts Brickyard, Walsall; Old Brooks Brickyard, Walsall; Long House Brickyard, Cannock; Rumer Hill Brickyard, Cannock; Penkridge Brickyard; Wolgarstone Stone Quarry, Teddesley; Wood Bank and Quarry Heath Stone Quarries, Teddesley; Gravel Pit, Huntington; Sand Pit at Hungry Hill, Teddesley. Also land rentals from some of the mine properties.
- Tithes from 579 occupiers in Hatherton, Cannock, Leacroft, Hednesford, Cannock Wood, Wyrley, Saredon, Shareshill, Penkridge, Congreve, Mitton, Whiston, Rodbaston, Coppenhall, Dunston, Bloxwich, Walsall Wood.

Although most of Hatherton's income from agriculture came in the form of rents and tithes, he was also a considerable farmer on his own account. He drained and developed a large area of land to expand the home farm at Teddesley into a holding of some 1700 acres. Here he had 200 head of cattle and 2000 sheep. 700 acres were under cultivation, using a four-course crop rotation. By 1860, he had established a free agricultural college at Teddesley for 30 boys, many the sons of tenants. The boys worked for part of each day on the estate as well as receiving practical and formal instruction.

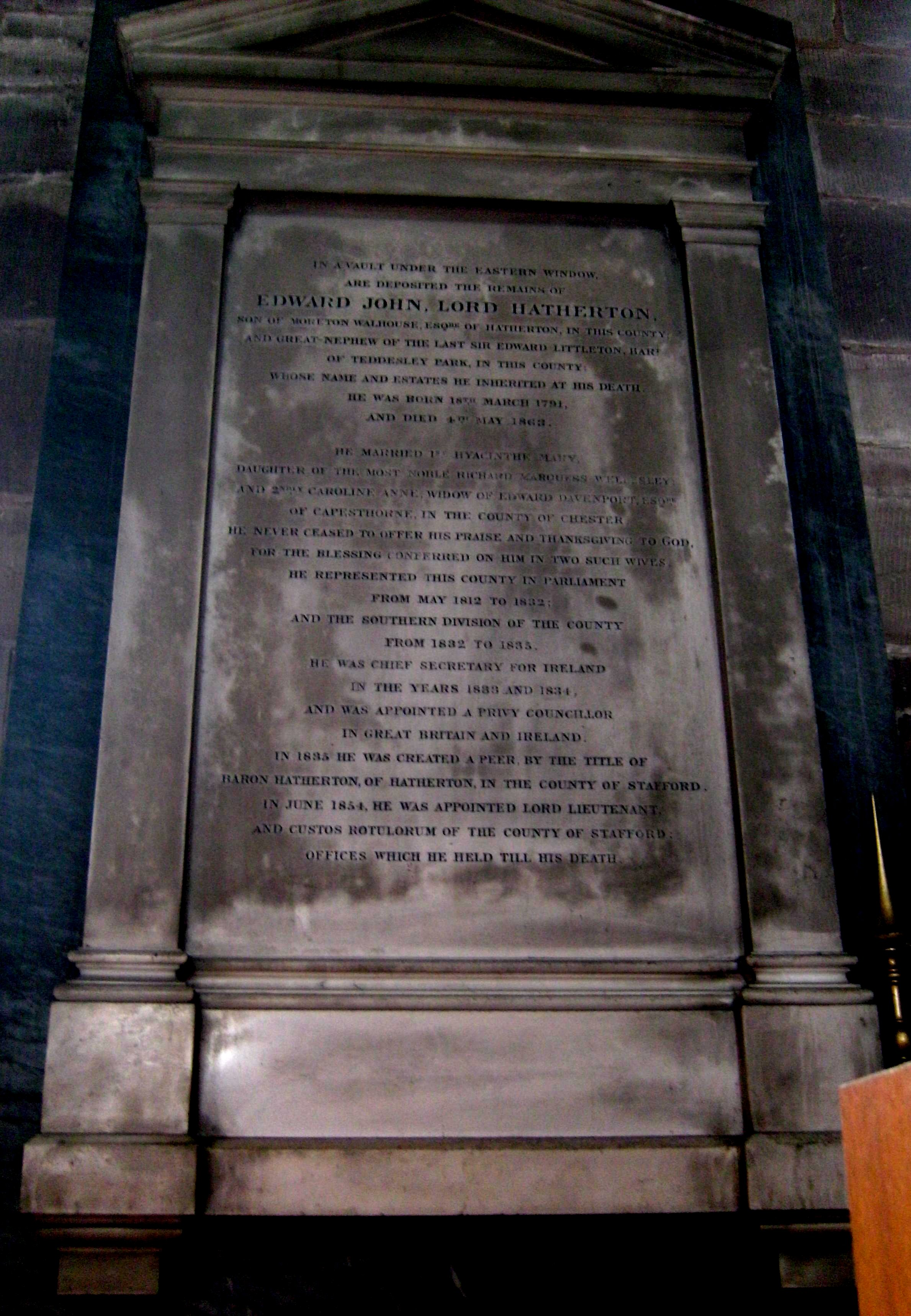
Memorial to Edward Littleton, 1st Baron Hatherton in St Michael's church, Penkridge.

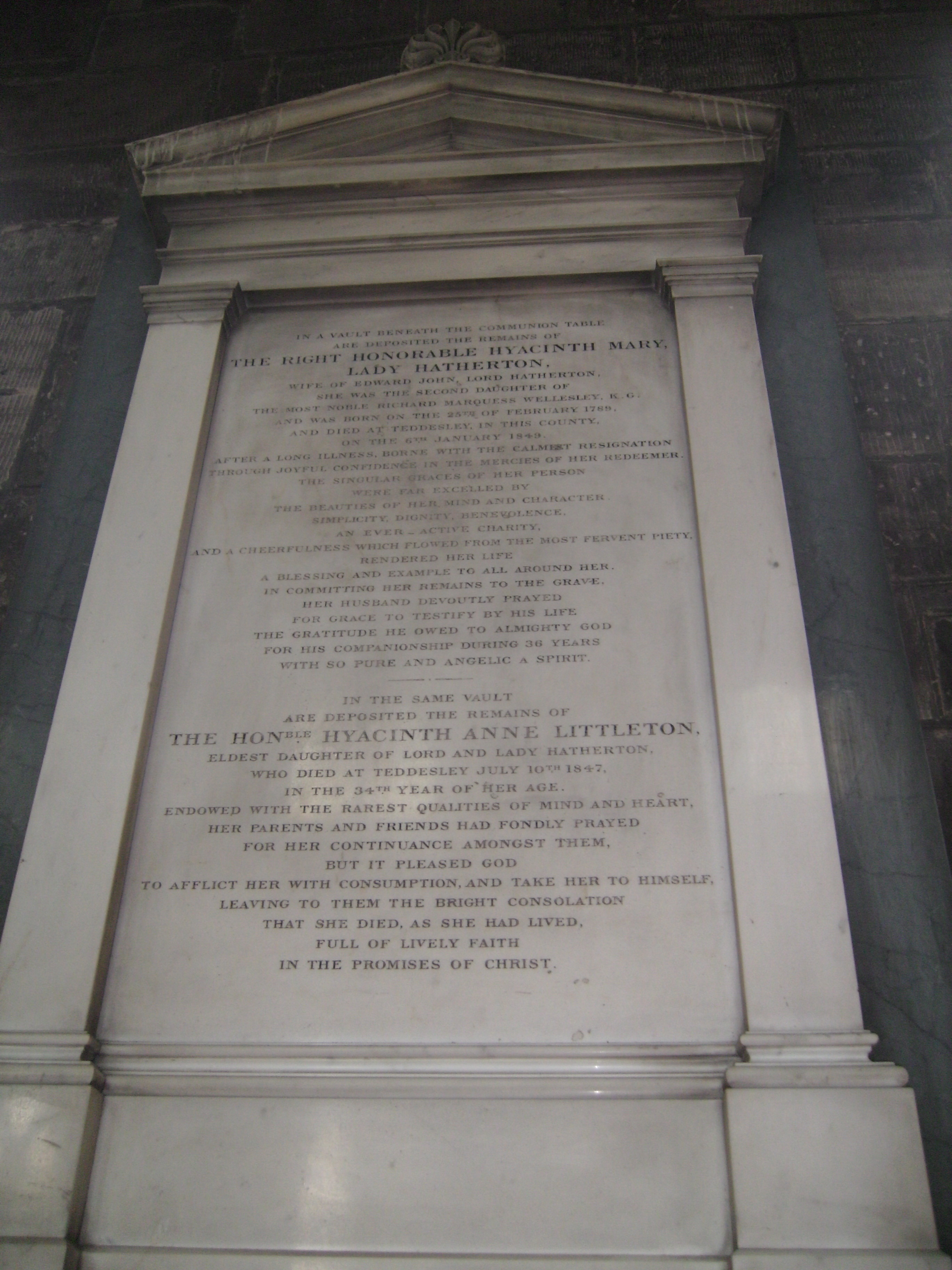
Memorial to Hatherton's wife and daughter, who predeceased him. St. Michael and All Angels, Penkridge

=== New Zealand Company ===
In 1825 Littleton was a director of the New Zealand Company, a venture chaired by the wealthy John George Lambton, Whig MP (and later 1st Earl of Durham), that made the first attempt to colonise New Zealand.

== Family ==
Lord Hatherton married Hyacinthe Mary Wellesley, eldest illegitimate daughter of Richard Wellesley, 1st Marquess Wellesley and Hyacinthe-Gabrielle Roland, in October 1812. One of the governesses to their children (1821–1825) was Anna Brownell Jameson, later an author and art historian.

Lady Hatherton died after a long illness on 6 January 1849. A daughter, Hyacinth Anne, had already died in 1847. In 1852 Hatherton married Caroline Davenport, née Hurt, (1810–1897) of Wirksworth, Derbyshire. He died at his Staffordshire residence, Teddesley Hall, in May 1863, aged 72, and was buried, with his first wife and daughter, at Penkridge parish church. He was succeeded in the barony by his son Edward.

Parliament of the United Kingdom
Preceded by Lord Granville Leveson-Gower; Sir Edward Littleton, Bt	Member of Parliament for Staffordshire; 1812–1832; With: Lord Granville Leveson-Gower 1812–1815; Earl Gower 1815–1820; Sir John Fenton Boughey, Bt 1820–1823; Sir John Wrottesley, Bt 1823–1832	Constituency abolished
New constituency	Member of Parliament for Staffordshire South; 1832–1835; With: Sir John Wrottesley, Bt	Succeeded by Sir John Wrottesley, Bt; Sir Francis Holyoake-Goodricke, Bt
Political offices
Preceded by Sir John Hobhouse, Bt	Chief Secretary for Ireland; 1833–1834	Succeeded by Sir Henry Hardinge
Military offices
Preceded by Hon Edward Monckton	Lieutenant-Colonel Commandant, Staffordshire Yeomanry; 1829–1833	Succeeded by Thomas Anson, 1st Earl of Lichfield
Honorary titles
Preceded by The Marquess of Anglesey	Lord Lieutenant of Staffordshire; 1854–1863	Succeeded by Thomas Anson, 2nd Earl of Lichfield
Peerage of the United Kingdom
New creation	Baron Hatherton; 1835–1863	Succeeded by Edward Richard Littleton
