= Edward Littleton, 2nd Baron Hatherton =

British peer and Liberal Member of Parliament

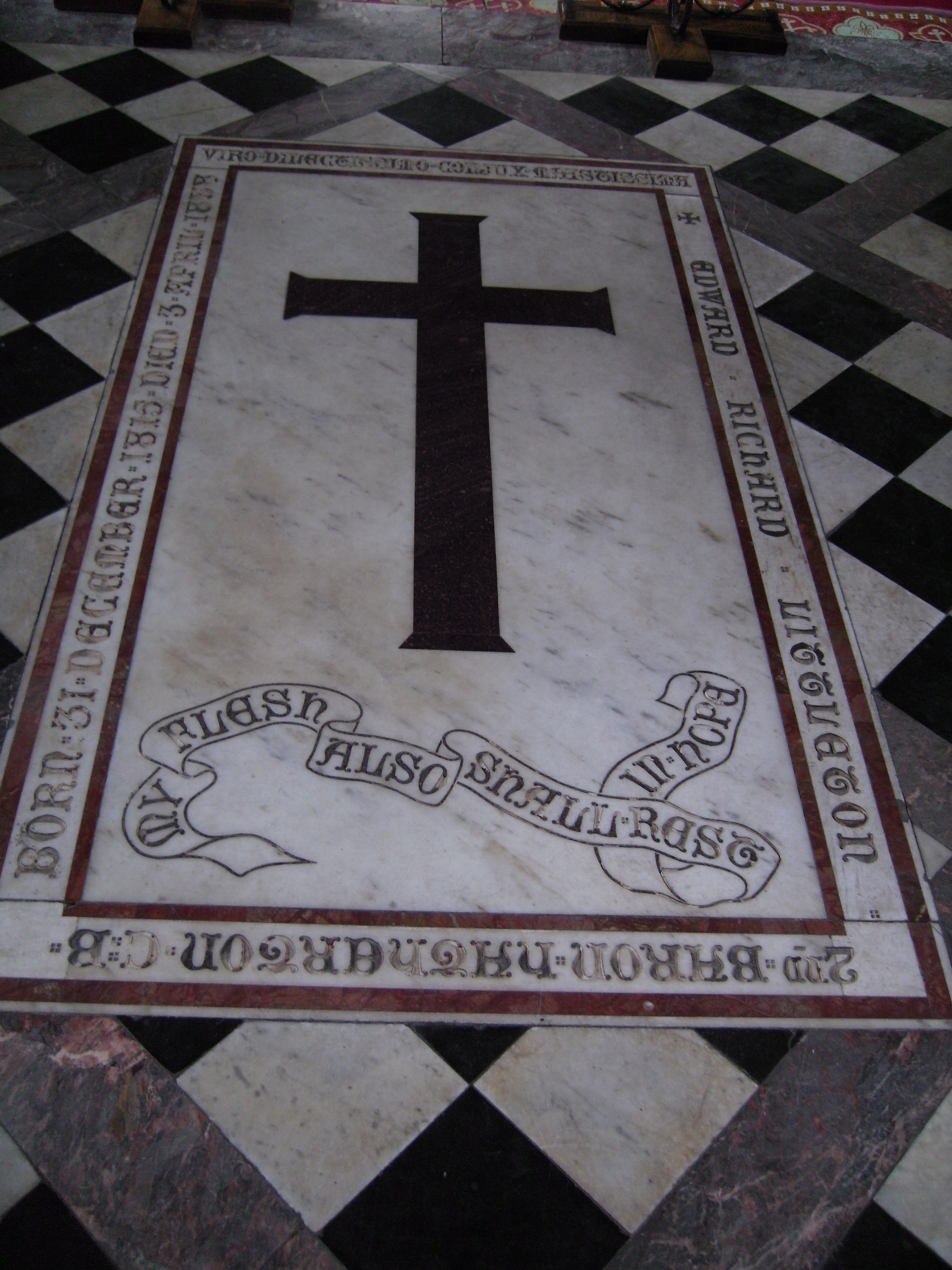
The 2nd Baron Hatherton was buried before the altar of St. Michael and All Angels church, Penkridge, Staffordshire.

Edward Richard Littleton, 2nd Baron Hatherton CB (31 December 1815 – 2 April 1888) was a British peer and Liberal Member of Parliament from the extended Littleton/Lyttelton family.

Hatherton was the son of Edward John Littleton, 1st Baron Hatherton, and Hyacinthe Mary Wellesley, eldest illegitimate daughter of Richard Wellesley, 1st Marquess Wellesley. He was educated at Eton College.

He was elected to the House of Commons for Walsall in 1847, a seat he held until 1852. He then represented Staffordshire Southern from 1853 until 1857. In 1863 he succeeded his father as second Baron Hatherton and entered the House of Lords. He was not so active a politician as his father and Hansard records only two interventions in Parliament - one in the Commons, and one in the Lords.

He was also colonel of the King's Own (2nd Staffordshire) Light Infantry Militia. He was appointed a Companion of the Order of the Bath in the 1881 Birthday Honours.

Lord Hatherton married Lady Margaret Percy, second daughter of George Percy, 5th Duke of Northumberland, in 1841. They had five sons:

- Hon. Edward George Percy CMG (born 15 August 1842)
- Hon. Algernon Charles, R.N. (born 1843), married Lady Margaret Needham, daughter of Francis Needham, 2nd Earl of Kilmorey
- Hon. Henry Stuart (born 1844)
- Hon. William Francis CMG (born 1847)
- Rev. The Hon. Cecil James (born 1850) married Katherine, daughter of Sir Charles Robert Rowley, 4th Baronet

He died in April 1888 in London, aged 72, and was succeeded in the barony by his eldest son Edward. Lady Hatherton died in 1897.

Parliament of the United Kingdom
Preceded by Robert Wellbeloved Scott	Member of Parliament for Walsall; 1847–1852	Succeeded by Charles Forster
Preceded by George Anson; Viscount Lewisham	Member of Parliament for South Staffordshire; 1853–1857; With: Viscount Lewisham 1853–1854; Earl of Uxbridge 1854–1857	Succeeded by William Orme Foster; Henry John Wentworth Hodgetts-Foley
Peerage of the United Kingdom
Preceded by Edward John Littleton	Baron Hatherton; 1863–1888	Succeeded by Edward George Littleton
