= Shona McIsaac =

British politician

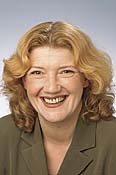

Member of Parliament
- In office 1 May 1997 – 12 April 2010
- Preceded by: Constituency created
- Succeeded by: Martin Vickers
- Constituency: Cleethorpes

Councillor for Wandsworth London Borough Council
- In office 3 May 1990 – 7 May 1998
- Ward: Tooting

Personal details
- Born: 3 April 1960 (age 66) Dunfermline, Fife, Scotland
- Party: Labour
- Spouse: Peter Keith
- Education: Durham University

Shona McIsaac (born 3 April 1960) is a British Labour Party politician. She was the Member of Parliament (MP) for Cleethorpes from 1997 to 2010. She was defeated by Conservative candidate Martin Vickers in the 2010 election.

== Early life ==
McIsaac was born in Dunfermline, Fife in Scotland.

== Before politics ==
She went to the SHAPE High School in Mons in Belgium, then Barne Barton Secondary Modern school in St Budeaux and Stoke Damerel High School for Girls in Stoke, Plymouth, which closed in 1986. She read for a BSc in Geography at St. Aidan's College of University of Durham, being taught by David Bellamy, and graduated in 1981.

She wrote and worked on women's weekly magazines, being deputy chief sub-editor of Bella, senior sub-editor of Chat and chief sub-editor of Woman.

== Parliament ==
McIsaac started her political career as a councillor to the London Borough of Wandsworth in the Tooting ward in 1990. She was selected to stand for election for Labour in Cleethorpes through an all-women shortlist. She won the Cleethorpes seat with a majority of over 9,000, defeating Michael Brown, the sitting MP for the predecessor seat of Brigg and Cleethorpes. She was re-elected in 2001 with a majority of 5,620, and again four years later, finishing over 2,000 votes ahead of her Conservative rival.

She served as a Parliamentary Private Secretary to the Minister of State within the Department of Health.

McIsaac proposed a bill limiting the use of fireworks, and supported anti-fox hunting measures.

McIsaac was described as a 'government loyalist' and a "super loyal backbencher". According to the website TheyWorkForYou.com, McIsaac rarely rebelled against the Government, with the BBC stating "she regards it almost as a duty to support the government's agenda". She supported the Government in the vote on the war in Iraq.

In October 2009, following significant research, McIsaac launched a small campaign to raise awareness of the poor state of many of Britain's war memorials. Her principal case study was of the war memorial in Wold Newton, a small village in her constituency. She spoke on the subject in the House of Commons and an article appeared in the Telegraph.

In May 2010, she was defeated by Martin Vickers, losing by just over 4,000 votes. Following the general election, she blamed Gordon Brown personally on television for Labour's defeat.

== Personal life ==
McIsaac lives in Cleethorpes with her husband Peter Keith, whom she married in 1994. Keith unsuccessfully contested the seat of Cleethorpes in 2015 and 2017.

== News items ==
- Demanding a ban on animals in circuses in 2006
- Assisting the extradition of Bob Kleasen in 2001

Parliament of the United Kingdom
| New constituency | Member of Parliament for Cleethorpes; 1997–2010 | Succeeded by Martin Vickers |
