= Robert Hawgood Crew =

English civil servant (1762–1839)

- Born: 23 August 1762; City of London, England
- Died: 16 September 1839 (aged 77); Brighton, Sussex, England
- Resting place: Horsham, Sussex, England
- Known for: Secretary of the Board of Ordnance
- Spouse: Mary Sophia Foreman

Robert Hawgood Crew (23 August 1762 – 16 September 1839) was an English civil servant who served as Secretary to the Board of Ordnance during the French Revolutionary Wars and Napoleonic Wars. His department was a major contributor to the naval and military successes of the United Kingdom and its allies.

== Early life ==
Baptised on 12 September 1762 in the church of St Dunstan-in-the-West in the City of London, he was the son of Robert Crew and his wife Elizabeth Oare. By 1777 he had a position with the Ordnance Department. This was the government department responsible for the military establishment of the United Kingdom and its overseas possessions, excluding India. The Ordnance provided buildings, fortifications, weapons and supplies for the two fighting arms, the British Army and the Royal Navy, as well as controlling the Royal Artillery and the Royal Engineers. It was the second largest department after HM Treasury and its head, the Master-General of the Ordnance, had a seat in the Cabinet.

== Secretary to the Board of Ordnance ==
In 1782, during the American Revolutionary War, it was decided to create the separate post of Secretary to the Board of Ordnance, with an office in Westminster close to the Houses of Parliament and a house so that he was always on site for urgent business. This senior post, equivalent to a permanent undersecretary in other civil service departments, carried pay and allowances of 556 pounds a year (worth about 57,000 pounds in 2014) plus the free residence. In May 1794 during the French Revolutionary Wars, the Master-General, Charles Lennox, 3rd Duke of Richmond, appointed Robert as Secretary. in place of Augustus Rogers who had died. His duties were :

To provide a secretarial service to the Board by submitting all relevant correspondence, attending their meetings and compiling their minutes.

To conduct the correspondence of the Board, preparing and getting signatures for all official letters and documents. The external correspondence was immense, comprising all other government departments together with all naval and military establishments around the world. Within the Ordnance Department itself, there were about a hundred units to communicate with and duplicates had to be sent for information to Ireland and to all overseas offices.

To maintain the voluminous records of the Ordnance Department.

To assist him, Robert had a staff of clerks and messengers. By 1810, after nearly 20 years of land and sea war, the activities of the Ordnance had expanded greatly. His salary and allowances then were 1535 pounds a year (about 97,000 pounds in 2014) and he was provided with a furnished house while a brand new one was being built for him in Pall Mall. Master-Generals he served under during his term were Charles Cornwallis, 1st Marquess Cornwallis from 1795 to 1801, John Pitt, 2nd Earl of Chatham from 1801 to 1806, Francis Rawdon Hastings, 2nd Earl of Moira from 1806 to 1807, Chatham again from 1807 to 1810, Henry Phipps, 1st Earl of Mulgrave from 1810 to 1819, and finally Arthur Wellesley, 1st Duke of Wellington from 1819 on.

He retired in 1823 after 46 years' service and died at the age of 77, his will being proved in London on 4 October 1839. His widow went to live with her daughter Mary and died at the age of 73.

== Family ==
In 1793 at the church of St Margaret, Westminster, he married Mary Sophia (1775–1848), daughter of John Foreman and his wife Jane Gordon. They had two daughters :

Mary Crew (1795–1872) in 1815 married James Eversfield, a Sussex landowner, and had three children, one being Sophia, Marchioness of Anglesey, the wife of Henry Paget, 3rd Marquess of Anglesey. After her first husband's death, in 1827 she married Henry Tredcroft, a Sussex landowner, and had two children, one being the cricketer Edward Tredcroft. After her second husband's death, in 1847 she married a Nottinghamshire clergyman, the Reverend John James Vaughan.

Jane Crew (1800–1864) in 1821 married a Devon clergyman the Reverend George Hole, who was a grandson of Bishop George Horne, and they had six children. Julia Hole, the eldest, was mother of the cricketer George Maximilian Bethune while Maria Hole, the youngest, was mother of the Indian administrator, Sir Ludovic Charles Porter.
