= Edward Tredcroft =

English cricketer

Edward Tredcroft (15 December 1828 – 8 April 1888) was an English landowner and cricketer from Sussex.

== Cricketing career ==
Active from 1851 to 1865, he played for Sussex. He appeared in 53 first-class matches as a righthanded batsman who also bowled slow underarm. He scored 759 runs with a highest score of 44 not out and took 11 wickets with a best performance of three in one innings. His own cricket ground played host to first-class games.

== Life ==
Born in the parish of Horsham, he was the elder son of Henry Tredcroft (1788-1844), a Sussex landowner, and his wife Mary Crew (1795-1872), daughter of Robert Hawgood Crew and widow of James Eversfield, After he father's death, when he inherited the family mansion and estate of Warnham Court, his mother married a third time. In 1850 he married Theodosia Sophia Bligh (1821-1898), daughter of Edward Bligh and his wife Sophia Eversfield, daughter of William Markwick, and two of their children reached adulthood: Theodosia Isabella Tredcroft (1851-1924), who in 1870 married Dennis Lambart Higgins (1847-1943) and had twelve children, and Henry Edward Tredcroft (1853-1912), who in 1877 married Mabel Lucy Ann Sarah Pigott (1852-1894) and had nine children.

He died in Westminster and was buried at Horsham, his half-sister Sophia being his executor.
