= George Maximilian Bethune =

English cricketer

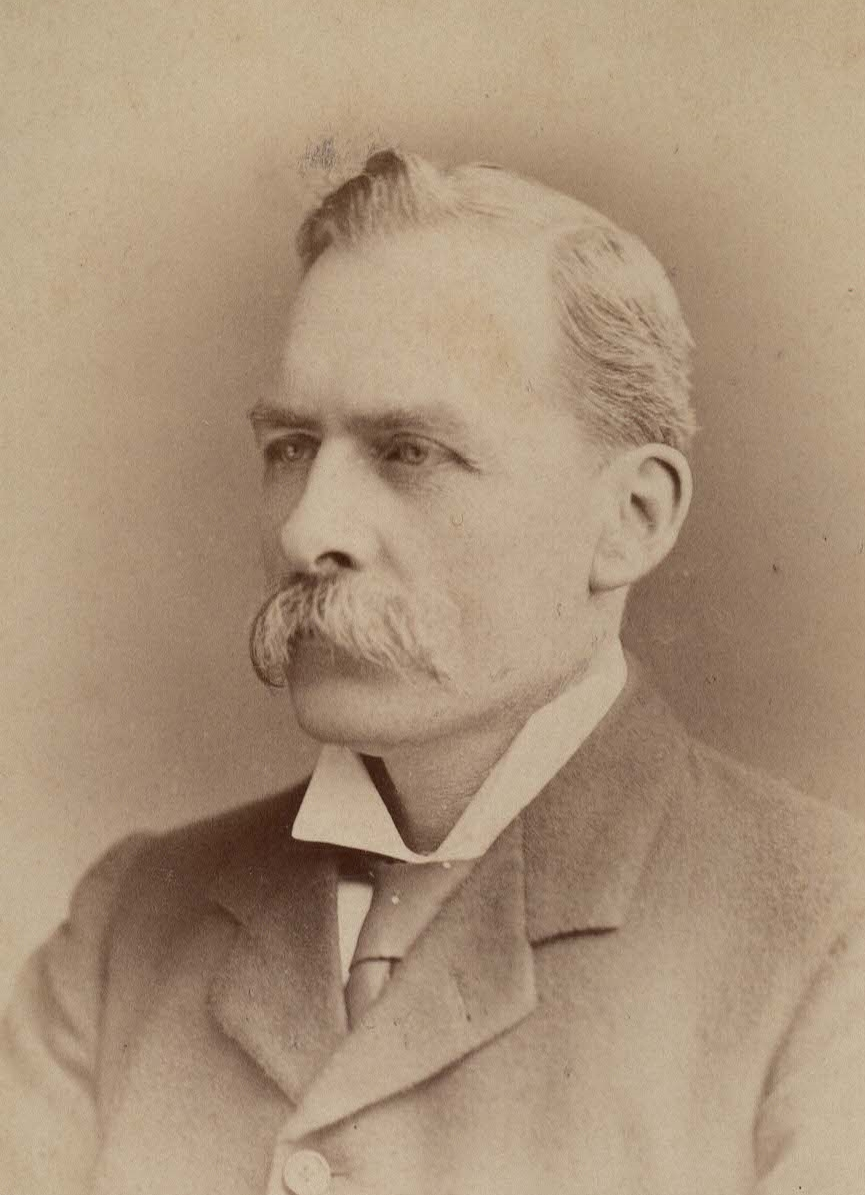

Personal information
- Born: 10 June 1854; North Bersted, Sussex, England
- Died: 9 February 1942 (aged 87); Bournemouth, Hampshire, England

Domestic team information
- Years: Team
- 1886 - 1892: Hampshire

Career statistics
Competition
Matches	6
Runs scored	77
Batting average	7.7
100s/50s	–/–
Top score	35
Balls bowled	396
Wickets	12
Bowling average	7.5
5 wickets in innings	–
10 wickets in match	–
Best bowling	4/25
Catches/stumpings	–
- Source: CricketArchive, 16 October 2015

George Maximilian Bethune (1854 – 1942) was an English cricketer who played for Hampshire during leaves from his occupation of managing sugar plantations in what was then British Guiana.

== Cricketing career ==
In 1886 and 1887 Hampshire played him as a batsman, with very limited success. In 1889 he was first used as a bowler, delivering 11 maidens out of 23 overs in his first match and taking 4 wickets for only 25 runs. Thereafter his place was owed to his highly economical bowling, which resulted over his brief career in 44% of his overs being maidens.

His first cousin Henry Beauclerk Bethune also played for Hampshire.

== Life ==
He was the son of the Reverend George Cuddington Bethune (1807-1898), at the time rector of Worth, Sussex, and his wife Julia (1822-1915), daughter of the Reverend George Hole, rector of Chulmleigh and grandson of George Horne, and his wife Jane, daughter of Robert Hawgood Crew.

He made his career in the sugar industry of British Guiana, becoming manager of the major estate of Enmore.

In 1890 he married Elizabeth de Burgh (1861-1930), daughter of Michael Rowland O'Maley, manager of the Colonial Bank (since part of Barclays) in Georgetown, and his first wife Julia Adriana, daughter of Major Jacob Heitmann Gyllich, Knight of the Dannebrog and grand-daughter of Frederik Christian von Meley. They had seven children.

His third son, Edward Charles O'Maley Bethune (1900-1985), was also a cricketer, playing for Felsted School.
