= Cleethorpes (constituency) =

UK Parliament constituency (1997–2024)

- Former county constituency for the House of Commons
- 2010–2024 boundary of Cleethorpes in the former county of Humberside

- Location of the former county of Humberside within England
- County: Lincolnshire
- Electorate: 72,187 (December 2019)
- Major settlements: Cleethorpes, Barton-upon-Humber, Immingham, Humberston and Waltham

1997–2024
- Seats: One
- Created from: Brigg & Cleethorpes
- Replaced by: Brigg and Immingham; Great Grimsby and Cleethorpes (part)

Cleethorpes was a constituency created in 1997, (Note: A county constituency (for the purposes of election expenses and type of returning officer)) represented in the House of Commons of the UK Parliament since 2010 by Martin Vickers of the Conservative Party. (Note: As with all existing constituencies, the constituency elects one Member of Parliament (MP) by the first past the post system of election at least every five years.)

Further to the completion of the 2023 review of Westminster constituencies, the seat was subject to boundary changes which entailed the loss of the centre of Cleethorpes to the new constituency of Great Grimsby and Cleethorpes, offset by the addition of the town of Brigg from the disappearing seat of Brigg and Goole. As a consequence, it was renamed Brigg and Immingham, and was first contested at the 2024 general election.

== Political history ==
Cleethorpes was historically considered as a bellwether seat, having been won by the party that went on to become the largest in the House of Commons at the seven elections contested from and including 1997 (Labour-won in 1997, 2001 and 2005 and Conservative-won in 2010, 2015, 2017 and 2019). However, this status may be under threat in the future, as the Conservatives won by a margin of over 20,000 votes in 2019 – what is considered a safe seat. The seat also swung heavily out of step with the nation as a whole from 2010 onwards, including swinging towards the Conservatives moderately in 2017, an election where Labour made significant gains.

== Constituency profile ==
The seat as it stood from the 2010-implemented boundary reforms (until its 2024 abolition) formed a broad c-shape as it followed the estuarine south coast of the Humber estuary, ranging from silt to sand along its shore. It was a large part-rural, part-urban seat predominantly on flat alluvial clay in northern Lincolnshire. As well as the eponymous town itself, the constituency included similarly commercial Barton-upon-Humber and industrial, container ship docks-hosting Immingham, as well as many smaller settlements. It surrounded on three sides the seat of Great Grimsby which covers the town of Grimsby and its short shoreline on the Humber; its other neighbours were Brigg & Goole, Gainsborough and Louth & Horncastle seats.

The Labour vote tended to be stronger around Cleethorpes town itself, in the wards of Croft Baker and Sidney Sussex as well as in Immingham, while the Conservative vote was much stronger across Humberston, Waltham, the rural villages and in parts of Barton.

== Boundaries ==
Map of boundaries 2010–2024

1997–2010: The Borough of North East Lincolnshire wards of Cleethorpes Park, Croft Baker, Haverstoe, Humberston, Immingham, and Wold Parishes, and the Borough of North Lincolnshire wards of Ferry and Wold.

2010–2024: The Borough of North East Lincolnshire wards of Croft Baker, Haverstoe, Humberston and New Waltham, Immingham, Sidney Sussex, Waltham, and Wolds, and the Borough of North Lincolnshire wards of Barton and Ferry.

== Members of Parliament ==
| Election | Member | Party |
|---|---|---|
| 1997 | Shona McIsaac | Labour |
| 2010 | Martin Vickers | Conservative |
| 2024 | Constituency abolished | |

== Election results 1997–2024 ==
=== Elections in the 1990s ===
General election 1997: Cleethorpes
| Party | Candidate | Votes | % | ±% |
|---|---|---|---|---|
| Labour | Shona McIsaac | 26,058 | 51.6 | |
| Conservative | Michael Brown | 16,882 | 33.4 | |
| Liberal Democrats | Keith Melton | 5,746 | 11.4 | |
| Referendum | John Berry | 894 | 3.5 | |
| Majority | | 9,176 | 18.2 | +4.9 |
| Turnout | | 49,580 | 73.4 | |
| Labour gain from Conservative | | Swing | | |

=== Elections in the 2000s ===
General election 2001: Cleethorpes
| Party | Candidate | Votes | % | ±% |
|---|---|---|---|---|
| Labour | Shona McIsaac | 21,032 | 49.6 | −2.0 |
| Conservative | Stephen Howd | 15,412 | 36.3 | +2.9 |
| Liberal Democrats | Gordon Smith | 5,080 | 12.0 | +0.6 |
| UKIP | Janet Hatton | 894 | 2.1 | New |
| Majority | | 5,620 | 13.3 | −4.9 |
| Turnout | | 42,418 | 62.0 | −11.4 |
| Labour hold | | Swing | | |

General election 2005: Cleethorpes
| Party | Candidate | Votes | % | ±% |
|---|---|---|---|---|
| Labour | Shona McIsaac | 18,889 | 43.3 | −6.3 |
| Conservative | Martin Vickers | 16,247 | 37.3 | +1.0 |
| Liberal Democrats | Geoff Lowis | 6,437 | 14.8 | +2.8 |
| UKIP | William Hardie | 2,016 | 4.6 | +2.5 |
| Majority | | 2,642 | 6.0 | −7.3 |
| Turnout | | 43,589 | 61.6 | −0.4 |
| Labour hold | | Swing | −3.6 | |

=== Elections in the 2010s ===
General election 2010: Cleethorpes
| Party | Candidate | Votes | % | ±% |
|---|---|---|---|---|
| Conservative | Martin Vickers | 18,939 | 42.1 | +4.8 |
| Labour | Shona McIsaac | 14,641 | 32.6 | −10.8 |
| Liberal Democrats | Malcolm Morland | 8,192 | 18.2 | +3.5 |
| UKIP | Stephen Harness | 3,194 | 7.1 | +2.5 |
| Majority | | 4,298 | 9.5 | N/A |
| Turnout | | 44,966 | 64.0 | +2.4 |
| Conservative gain from Labour | | Swing | +7.8 | |

General election 2015: Cleethorpes
| Party | Candidate | Votes | % | ±% |
|---|---|---|---|---|
| Conservative | Martin Vickers | 21,026 | 46.6 | +4.5 |
| Labour | Peter Keith | 13,133 | 29.1 | −3.5 |
| UKIP | Stephen Harness | 8,356 | 18.5 | +11.4 |
| Liberal Democrats | Roy Horobin | 1,346 | 3.0 | −15.2 |
| Green | Carol Thornton | 1,013 | 2.2 | New |
| TUSC | Malcolm Morland | 215 | 0.5 | New |
| Majority | | 7,893 | 17.5 | +8.0 |
| Turnout | | 45,089 | 63.9 | −0.1 |
| Conservative hold | | Swing | +4.0 | |

General election 2017: Cleethorpes
| Party | Candidate | Votes | % | ±% |
|---|---|---|---|---|
| Conservative | Martin Vickers | 27,321 | 57.1 | +10.5 |
| Labour | Peter Keith | 16,921 | 35.4 | +6.3 |
| UKIP | Tony Blake | 2,022 | 4.2 | −14.3 |
| Liberal Democrats | Roy Horobin | 1,110 | 2.3 | −0.7 |
| Green | Loyd Emmerson | 470 | 1.0 | −1.2 |
| Majority | | 10,400 | 21.7 | +4.2 |
| Turnout | | 47,844 | 65.5 | +1.6 |
| Conservative hold | | Swing | +2.1 | |

General election 2019: Cleethorpes
| Party | Candidate | Votes | % | ±% |
|---|---|---|---|---|
| Conservative | Martin Vickers | 31,969 | 69.0 | +11.9 |
| Labour | Ros James | 10,551 | 22.8 | −12.6 |
| Liberal Democrats | Roy Horobin | 2,535 | 5.5 | +3.2 |
| Green | Jodi Shanahan | 1,284 | 2.8 | +1.8 |
| Majority | | 21,418 | 46.2 | +24.5 |
| Turnout | | 46,339 | 62.9 | −2.6 |
| Conservative hold | | Swing | +12.25 | |

== See also ==
- parliamentary constituencies in Humberside
