= Great Grimsby Borough Council elections =

Local government elections in Humberside, England

Great Grimsby was a non-metropolitan district in Humberside, England. It was abolished on 1 April 1996 and replaced by North East Lincolnshire.

== Political control ==
Prior to 1974, Great Grimsby was a county borough, independent from any county council. Under the Local Government Act 1972 it became a non-metropolitan district, with Humberside County Council providing county-level services in the borough. The first election to the reconstituted borough council was held in 1973, initially operating as a shadow authority before coming into its revised powers on 1 April 1974. Political control of the council from 1974 until its abolition in 1996 was as follows:

Party in control	Years
No overall control	1974–1976
Conservative	1976–1979
Labour	1979–1983
No overall control	1983–1986
Labour	1986–1996

== Council elections ==
- 1973 Grimsby Borough Council election
- 1976 Grimsby Borough Council election
- 1979 Great Grimsby Borough Council election (New ward boundaries)
- 1980 Great Grimsby Borough Council election
- 1982 Great Grimsby Borough Council election
- 1983 Great Grimsby Borough Council election
- 1984 Great Grimsby Borough Council election
- 1986 Great Grimsby Borough Council election
- 1987 Great Grimsby Borough Council election
- 1988 Great Grimsby Borough Council election
- 1990 Great Grimsby Borough Council election
- 1991 Great Grimsby Borough Council election
- 1992 Great Grimsby Borough Council election
- 1994 Great Grimsby Borough Council election
