= Henry Bethune (cricketer) =

English cricketer

Personal information
- Full name: Henry Beauclerk Bethune
- Born: 16 November 1844; Horsham, Sussex, England
- Died: 16 April 1912 (aged 67); Horsham, Sussex, England
- Batting: Right-handed
- Bowling: Unknown-arm slow

Domestic team information
- Years: Team
- 1885–1897: Hampshire

Career statistics
| Competition | First-class |
|---|---|
| Matches | 2 |
| Runs scored | 26 |
| Batting average | 8.66 |
| 100s/50s | –/– |
| Top score | 9 |
| Balls bowled | 60 |
| Wickets | 1 |
| Bowling average | 27.00 |
| 5 wickets in innings | – |
| 10 wickets in match | – |
| Best bowling | 1/27 |
| Catches/stumpings | 1/– |
- Source: Cricinfo, 9 January 2010

Henry Beauclerk Bethune (16 November 1844 – 16 April 1912) was an English first-class cricketer and British Army officer.

The third son of Charles Goodwin Bethune, a Sussex landowner, and his wife Ann Isabella Mary, he was born and grew up on the family estate of Denne Park in Horsham. Bethune purchased a commission in the British Army in November 1865, joining the 37th Foot as an ensign. He purchased the rank of lieutenant in April 1868, and was appointed an instructor of musketry in April 1869. He was promoted, without purchase, to captain in June 1879 and was seconded for service as an instructor at Sandhurst. He retired from active service, in what was by then the Royal Hampshire Regiment, in November 1884.

Having played cricket at both club and services level, Bethune made his debut in first-class cricket for Hampshire against Somerset at Taunton in 1885. With Hampshire losing their first-class status following that season, he continued to play minor matches for the county until it regained its first-class status in 1894. Following the restoration of their first-class status, Bethune made a second first-class appearance for Hampshire against Lancashire at Southampton in the 1897 County Championship. It was in this match that he took his only first-class wicket, when he dismissed Arthur Paul. In club cricket, Bethune was known to have played several long innings, including a score of 219 for the Corinthians against the United Services in 1890. He had been a member of the Marylebone Cricket Club since 1888. He died, unmarried, at Horsham in April 1912. His cousin, George Maximilian Bethune, was also a first-class cricketer.
