= South Staffordshire (constituency) =

UK Parliament constituency (1983–2024)

- Former county constituency for the House of Commons
- 2010–2024 boundary of South Staffordshire in Staffordshire

- Location of Staffordshire within England
- County: Staffordshire
- Electorate: 74,189 (December 2010)
- Major settlements: Bilbrook, Codsall, Landywood, Wombourne

1983–2024
- Seats: One
- Created from: South West Staffordshire
- Replaced by: Kingswinford and South Staffordshire, Stone, Great Wyrley and Penkridge

1832–1868
- Seats: Two
- Type of constituency: County constituency
- Created from: Staffordshire
- Replaced by: East Staffordshire; West Staffordshire; Wednesbury

South Staffordshire was a constituency (Note: A county constituency (for the purposes of election expenses and type of returning officer)) represented in the House of Commons of the UK Parliament. (Note: As with all constituencies, the constituency elects one Member of Parliament (MP) by the first past the post system of election at least every five years.)

Further to the completion of the 2023 review of Westminster constituencies, the seat was abolished. Subject to major boundary changes, it was reformed as Kingswinford and South Staffordshire, which was first contested at the 2024 general election. Part of the constituency was absorbed into the new seat of Stone, Great Wyrley and Penkridge, with Sir Gavin Williamson becoming its MP.

== Boundaries ==
Map of boundaries 2010–2024

1832–1868: The Hundreds of South Offlow, Seisdon and Cuttleston.

1983–1997: The District of South Staffordshire.

1997–2010: The District of South Staffordshire wards of Bilbrook, Brewood and Coven, Cheslyn Hay, Codsall North, Codsall South, Essington, Featherstone, Great Wyrley Landywood, Great Wyrley Town, Kinver, Lower Penn, Pattingham and Patshull, Perton Central, Perton Dippons, Shareshill, Swindon, Trysull and Seisdon, Wombourne North, Wombourne South East, and Wombourne South West.

2010–2024: The District of South Staffordshire wards of Bilbrook, Brewood and Coven, Cheslyn Hay North and Saredon, Cheslyn Hay South, Codsall North, Codsall South, Essington, Featherstone and Shareshill, Great Wyrley Landywood, Great Wyrley Town, Himley and Swindon, Huntington and Hatherton, Kinver, Pattingham and Patshull, Perton Dippons, Perton East, Perton Lakeside, Trysull and Seisdon, Wombourne North and Lower Penn, Wombourne South East, and Wombourne South West.

The constituency was made up of about two-thirds of the South Staffordshire local government district, its southern bulk. It flanked the western edge of the West Midlands, the closest parts being Wolverhampton and Dudley and did not contain any large towns; the largest town (by electorate) was Wombourne. Its settlements included Brewood, Cheslyn Hay, Codsall, Featherstone, Great Wyrley, Kinver, Perton and Wombourne. Most electoral wards were locally Conservative safe seats with Labour's only area of frequent strength, Cheslyn Hay, a town with historically a greater dependence on coal mining than the others.

=== Abolition ===
Further to the completion of the 2023 review of Westminster constituencies, the seat was abolished. Northern parts, including Great Wyrley along with adjoining built up areas such as Cheslyn Hay, were moved to the newly created constituency of Stone, Great Wyrley and Penkridge. To compensate, the Borough of Dudley communities of Kingswinford, Wall Heath and Wordsley were transferred from the also-abolished seat of Dudley South, thereby forming a cross-boundary constituency, to be named Kingswinford and South Staffordshire.

== History ==
=== 1832–1868 ===
The ancient county constituency of Staffordshire was divided under the Reform Act 1832 into two two-member constituencies, while other parts of the old constituency were made into or added to borough constituencies. These halves were formally the Northern division of Staffordshire and the Southern division of Staffordshire with less formal variations more common. The Reform Act 1867 abolished the Southern Division with effect from the 1868 general election, replacing it with two new two-seat constituencies: East Staffordshire and West Staffordshire.

Prominent figures

Edward Littleton was involved heavily in Catholic Emancipation, the Truck Act 1831, the Parliamentary Boundaries Act 1832 and the Municipal Corporations Act 1835. For two years he was Chief Secretary for Ireland, prominent in the governments led by Melbourne.

Henry Chetwynd-Talbot (later the Earl of Shrewsbury) became an Admiral and whip in the House of Lords in later in life. In most of this early period the constituency elected prominent land-owning industrialists, including, for example, in Walsall, and Wolverhampton. Henry Hodgetts-Foley inherited the majority of Penkridge, now in the Stafford seat, much developed by his heirs.

=== 1983–2024 ===
The second creation of the South Staffordshire constituency was established in 1983, although in reality this was merely a renaming of the Staffordshire South West constituency formed in 1974 from parts of the former constituencies of Brierley Hill and Cannock. It covered the whole of the South Staffordshire district until 1997, when the area around Penkridge was removed to the Stafford constituency.

South Staffordshire was a safe seat for the Conservative Party, with Sir Patrick Cormack having held it from its creation in 1974 until he retired in 2010, when he was succeeded by Sir Gavin Williamson. Williamson has held many offices, including Parliamentary Private Secretary to the Prime Minister from 2013 until 2016, Chief Whip of the House of Commons from 2016 until 2017, Defence Secretary from 2017 to 2019, and Education Secretary from 2019 until his return to the backbenches in 2021.

=== General election 2005 ===
On 30 April 2005, the Liberal Democrat candidate Josephine Harrison died of an undisclosed illness at the age of 53. Election procedures at the time required that in the event of a candidate's death after the close of nominations, the returning officer had to direct the general election poll (due to be held on 5 May) to be abandoned, and to call a fresh general election poll. This was duly done under the same writ of election, 28 days after having seen proof of death. As the poll was not strictly a by-election, but rather a part of the general election, it was run under general election regulations; for instance, not qualifying for the significantly higher election expenses available at by-elections.

The original candidates were:

- Penny Barber, Labour
- Sir Patrick Cormack, Conservative
- Adrian Davies. Freedom Party
- Josephine Harrison, Liberal Democrats
- Malcolm Hurst, United Kingdom Independence Party

On 9 May, the Labour candidate, Penny Barber, announced that she was standing down as she could not afford to take any more time off work. The constituency Labour Party had to select a new candidate, choosing Paul Kalinauckas who had been their candidate in the 2001 election. The Liberal Democrats selected Jo Crotty as their replacement candidate. In addition, three additional candidates who had not been nominated for the original poll fought the delayed election: Kate Spohrer of the Green Party, Rev. David Braid of Clause 28 Children's Protection Christian Democrats, and most notably the journalist Garry Bushell representing the English Democrats Party, who had already stood in the Greenwich and Woolwich constituency on 5 May, where he had polled 3.4%.

The election was eventually held on 23 June 2005 and saw Sir Patrick Cormack hold the seat. With the seat being safely Conservative, and with the results of the general election in other constituencies already known, the election attracted a considerably lower turnout (37.3%) than in other constituencies (akin to a by-election). Cormack increased his majority to 34.5% (a 9.1% swing), while the United Kingdom Independence Party saw one of their best results of 2005, with 10.4% of the vote.

A year later the Electoral Administration Act 2006 was passed, in part because of the events in South Staffordshire. Under the new rules, in case of the death of a candidate, the party of the deceased candidate is allowed to select a replacement candidate. New nominations from parties which did not contest the original poll are no longer permitted. This rule was first used in the 2010 general election when the UKIP candidate for Thirsk and Malton died before the election.

== Constituency profile ==
A Guardian statistical compilation by constituency in November 2012 showed that 2.8% of the population only were registered jobseekers, significantly lower than the national average of 3.8%.

== Members of Parliament ==
=== MPs 1832–1868 ===
Election	First member	First party	Second member	Second party
1832	Edward Littleton	Whig	Sir John Wrottesley, Bt	Whig
1835 by-election	Sir Francis Holyoake-Goodricke, Bt	Conservative	Sir John Wrottesley, Bt	Whig
1837	George Anson	Whig	Henry Chetwynd-Talbot	Conservative
1849 by-election	George Anson	Whig	William Legge	Conservative
1853 by-election	Edward Littleton	Whig	William Legge	Conservative
1854 by-election	Edward Littleton	Whig	Henry Paget, Earl of Uxbridge	Whig
1857	William Orme Foster	Whig	Henry Hodgetts-Foley	Whig
1859	William Orme Foster	Liberal	Henry Hodgetts-Foley	Liberal
1868	Constituency abolished: replaced by East Staffordshire and West Staffordshire			

=== MPs 1983–2024 ===
Election	Member	Party	Notes
1983	Sir Patrick Cormack	Conservative	Previously MP for South West Staffordshire
2010	Sir Gavin Williamson	Conservative	Secretary of State for Defence (2017–2019); Secretary of State for Education (2019–2021)
2024	Constituency abolished: replaced by Kingswinford & South Staffordshire and Stone, Great Wyrley & Penkridge		

== Elections ==
=== Elections in the 2010s ===
General election 2019: South Staffordshire
Party	Candidate	Votes	%	±%
Conservative	Gavin Williamson	36,520	73.0	▲3.2
Labour	Adam Freeman	8,270	16.5	▼8.8
Liberal Democrats	Chris Fewtrell	3,280	6.6	▲4.0
Green	Claire McIlvenna	1,935	3.9	▲1.6
Majority		28,250	56.5	▲12.0
Turnout		50,005	67.9	▼1.7
Conservative hold		Swing	▲6.0	

General election 2017: South Staffordshire
Party	Candidate	Votes	%	±%
Conservative	Gavin Williamson	35,656	69.8	▲10.4
Labour	Adam Freeman	12,923	25.3	▲6.9
Liberal Democrats	Hilary Myers	1,348	2.6	▼0.3
Green	Claire McIlvenna	1,182	2.3	▼0.3
Majority		22,733	44.5	▲3.5
Turnout		51,109	69.6	▲1.4
Conservative hold		Swing	▲1.7	

General election 2015: South Staffordshire
Party	Candidate	Votes	%	±%
Conservative	Gavin Williamson	29,478	59.4	▲6.2
Labour	Kevin McElduff	9,107	18.4	▼1.9
UKIP	Lyndon Jones	8,267	16.7	▲11.2
Liberal Democrats	Robert Woodthorpe Browne	1,448	2.9	▼13.8
Green	Claire McIlvenna	1,298	2.6	New
Majority		20,371	41.0	▲7.1
Turnout		49,598	68.2	▼0.5
Conservative hold		Swing	▲4.05	

The vote share change in 2010 comes from the notional, not actual, results because of boundary changes.

General election 2010: South Staffordshire
Party	Candidate	Votes	%	±%
Conservative	Gavin Williamson	26,834	53.2	▲2.5
Labour	Kevin McElduff	10,244	20.3	▲0.3
Liberal Democrats	Sarah Fellows	8,427	16.7	▲3.3
UKIP	Mike Nattrass	2,753	5.5	▼4.7
BNP	David Bradnock	1,928	3.8	New
Independent	Andrew Morris	254	0.5	New
Majority		16,590	32.9	▲2.2
Turnout		50,440	68.7	▲31.1
Conservative hold		Swing	▲1.1	

=== Elections in the 2000s ===
General election 2005: South Staffordshire
Party	Candidate	Votes	%	±%
Conservative	Patrick Cormack	13,343	52.0	▲1.5
Labour	Paul Kalinauckas	4,496	17.6	▼16.6
Liberal Democrats	Jo Crotty	3,540	13.8	▲2.2
UKIP	Malcolm Hurst	2,675	10.4	▲6.7
English Democrat	Garry Bushell	643	2.5	New
Green	Kate Spohrer	437	1.7	New
Freedom (UK)	Adrian Davies	434	1.7	New
Clause 28 Children's Protection Christian Democrats	David Braid	67	0.3	New
Majority		8,847	34.4	▲18.1
Turnout		25,609	37.3	▼23.0
Conservative hold		Swing	▲9.1	

- The 2005 election in South Staffordshire was postponed until 23 June 2005, after Jo Harrison, the original candidate of the Liberal Democrats, died on 30 April 2005, shortly before the general election.

General election 2001: South Staffordshire
Party	Candidate	Votes	%	±%
Conservative	Patrick Cormack	21,295	50.5	▲0.5
Labour	Paul Kalinauckas	14,414	34.2	▼0.5
Liberal Democrats	Josephine Harrison	4,891	11.6	▲0.3
UKIP	Mike Lynch	1,580	3.7	New
Majority		6,881	16.3	▲1.0
Turnout		42,180	60.3	▼13.9
Conservative hold		Swing		

=== Elections in the 1990s ===
General election 1997: South Staffordshire
Party	Candidate	Votes	%	±%
Conservative	Patrick Cormack	25,568	50.0	▼9.7
Labour	Judith LeMaistre	17,747	34.7	▲8.6
Liberal Democrats	Jamie Calder	5,797	11.3	▼2.9
Referendum	Peter Carnell	2,002	3.9	New
Majority		7,821	15.3	▼18.3
Turnout		51,114	74.2	▼7.3
Conservative hold		Swing	▼9.0	

General election 1992: South Staffordshire
Party	Candidate	Votes	%	±%
Conservative	Patrick Cormack	40,266	59.7	▼1.2
Labour	BA Wylie	17,633	26.1	▲7.0
Liberal Democrats	IL Sadler	9,584	14.2	▼5.9
Majority		22,633	33.6	▼7.2
Turnout		67,483	81.5	▲3.3
Conservative hold		Swing	▼4.1	

=== Elections in the 1980s ===
General election 1987: South Staffordshire
Party	Candidate	Votes	%	±%
Conservative	Patrick Cormack	37,708	60.9	▲1.7
Liberal	Fran Oborski	12,440	20.1	▼3.4
Labour	Philip Bateman	11,805	19.1	▲1.8
Majority		25,268	40.8	▲5.1
Turnout		61,953	78.2	▲2.4
Conservative hold		Swing		

General election 1983: South Staffordshire
Party	Candidate	Votes	%	±%
Conservative	Patrick Cormack	32,764	59.2	▼1.2
Liberal	John Chambers	13,004	23.5	▲13.2
Labour	Martin Cartwright	9,568	17.3	▼10.4
Majority		19,760	35.7	▲3.0
Turnout		55,336	75.8	
Conservative win (new seat)				

=== Elections in the 1860s ===
General election 1865: South Staffordshire
Party	Candidate	Votes	%	±%
Liberal	Henry Hodgetts-Foley	Unopposed		
Liberal	William Orme Foster	Unopposed		
Registered electors		10,841		
Liberal hold				
Liberal hold				

=== Elections in the 1850s ===
General election 1859: South Staffordshire
Party	Candidate	Votes	%	±%
Liberal	Henry Hodgetts-Foley	Unopposed		
Liberal	William Orme Foster	Unopposed		
Registered electors		11,375		
Liberal hold				
Liberal hold				

General election 1857: South Staffordshire
Party	Candidate	Votes	%	±%
Whig	Henry Hodgetts-Foley	Unopposed		
Whig	William Orme Foster	Unopposed		
Registered electors		11,202		
Whig hold				
Whig gain from Conservative				

By-election, 8 February 1854: South Staffordshire
Party	Candidate	Votes	%	±%
Whig	Henry Paget	4,328	61.0	N/A
Conservative	Charles Chetwynd-Talbot	2,769	39.0	N/A
Majority		1,559	22.0	N/A
Turnout		7,097	71.4	N/A
Registered electors		9,933		
Whig gain from Conservative		Swing	N/A	

- Caused by Legge's succession to the peerage, becoming 5th Earl of Dartmouth.

By-election, 15 August 1853: South Staffordshire
Party	Candidate	Votes	%	±%
Whig	Edward Littleton	Unopposed		
Whig hold				

- Caused by Anson's resignation.

General election 1852: South Staffordshire
Party	Candidate	Votes	%	±%
Whig	George Anson	Unopposed		
Conservative	William Legge	Unopposed		
Registered electors		10,116		
Whig hold				
Conservative hold				

=== Elections in the 1840s ===
By-election, 19 February 1849: South Staffordshire
Party	Candidate	Votes	%	±%
Conservative	William Legge	Unopposed		
Conservative hold				

- Caused by Chetwynd-Talbot's succession to the peerage, becoming 18th Earl of Shrewsbury

General election 1847: South Staffordshire
Party	Candidate	Votes	%	±%
Whig	George Anson	Unopposed		
Conservative	Henry Chetwynd-Talbot	Unopposed		
Registered electors		8,545		
Whig hold				
Conservative hold				

By-election, 17 July 1846: South Staffordshire
Party	Candidate	Votes	%	±%
Whig	George Anson	Unopposed		
Whig hold				

- Caused by Anson's appointment as Clerk of the Ordnance

General election 1841: South Staffordshire
Party	Candidate	Votes	%	±%
Whig	George Anson	Unopposed		
Conservative	Henry Chetwynd-Talbot	Unopposed		
Registered electors		8,798		
Whig hold				
Conservative hold				

=== Elections in the 1830s ===
General election 1837: South Staffordshire
Party	Candidate	Votes	%
Whig	George Anson	3,173	25.7
Conservative	Henry Chetwynd-Talbot	3,126	25.3
Conservative	Richard Dyott	3,046	24.7
Whig	John Wrottesley	2,993	24.3
Turnout		6,269	79.6
Registered electors		7,871	
Majority		47	0.4
Whig hold			
Majority		180	1.4
Conservative gain from Whig			

By-election, 23 May 1835: South Staffordshire
Party	Candidate	Votes	%
Conservative	Francis Holyoake Goodricke	1,776	53.3
Whig	George Anson	1,553	46.7
Majority		223	6.6
Turnout		3,329	83.4
Registered electors		3,990	
Conservative gain from Whig			

- Caused by Littleton's elevation to the peerage, becoming 1st Baron Hatherton

General election 1835: South Staffordshire
Party	Candidate	Votes	%
Whig	Edward Littleton	Unopposed	
Whig	John Wrottesley	Unopposed	
Registered electors		3,990	
Whig hold			
Whig hold			

By-election, 7 June 1833: South Staffordshire
Party	Candidate	Votes	%
Whig	Edward Littleton	439	98.7
Tory	Henry Chetwynd-Talbot	6	1.3
Majority		433	97.4
Turnout		445	14.3
Registered electors		3,107	
Whig hold			

- Caused by Littleton's appointment as Chief Secretary to the Lord Lieutenant of Ireland

General election 1832: South Staffordshire
Party	Candidate	Votes	%
Whig	Edward Littleton	Unopposed	
Whig	John Wrottesley	Unopposed	
Registered electors		3,107	
Whig win (new seat)			
Whig win (new seat)			

== See also ==
- parliamentary constituencies in Staffordshire
