= South West Staffordshire =

UK Parliament constituency (1974–1983)

- Former county constituency for the House of Commons
- County: Staffordshire

1974–1983
- Seats: One
- Created from: Wolverhampton North East, Brierley Hill and Cannock (parts)
- Replaced by: South Staffordshire

South West Staffordshire was a parliamentary constituency in Staffordshire. It returned one Member of Parliament (MP) to the House of Commons of the Parliament of the United Kingdom, elected by the first past the post system.

== History ==
The constituency was created for the February 1974 general election, and abolished for the 1983 general election.

== Boundaries ==
The Rural Districts of Cannock and Seisdon.

== Members of Parliament ==
Election	Member	Party
Feb 1974	Patrick Cormack	Conservative
1983	renamed South Staffordshire	

== Election results ==
=== Elections in the 1970s ===
General election February 1974: South West Staffordshire
Party	Candidate	Votes	%	±%
Conservative	Patrick Cormack	23,878	48.84	
Labour	Ivor Wymer	14,120	28.88	
Liberal	Eric Freeman	10,408	21.29	
English National	David Maxwell	482	0.99	
Majority		9,758	19.96	
Turnout		48,888	80.74	
Conservative win (new seat)				

General election October 1974: South West Staffordshire
Party	Candidate	Votes	%	±%
Conservative	Patrick Cormack	22,604	49.11	+0.27
Labour	Ivor Wymer	15,065	32.73	+3.85
Liberal	Anthony Lambert	8,355	18.15	−3.14
Majority		7,539	16.38	−3.58
Turnout		46,024	75.40	−5.34
Conservative hold		Swing	−1.79	

General election 1979: South West Staffordshire
Party	Candidate	Votes	%	±%
Conservative	Patrick Cormack	32,153	60.39	+11.28
Labour	GJ Lane	14,720	27.65	−5.08
Liberal	R Fox	5,460	10.25	−7.90
National Front	J Thomas	912	1.71	New
Majority		17,433	32.74	+16.36
Turnout		53,245	79.02	+3.62
Conservative hold		Swing	+8.18	
