= Baron Hatherton =

Title in the Peerage of the United Kingdom

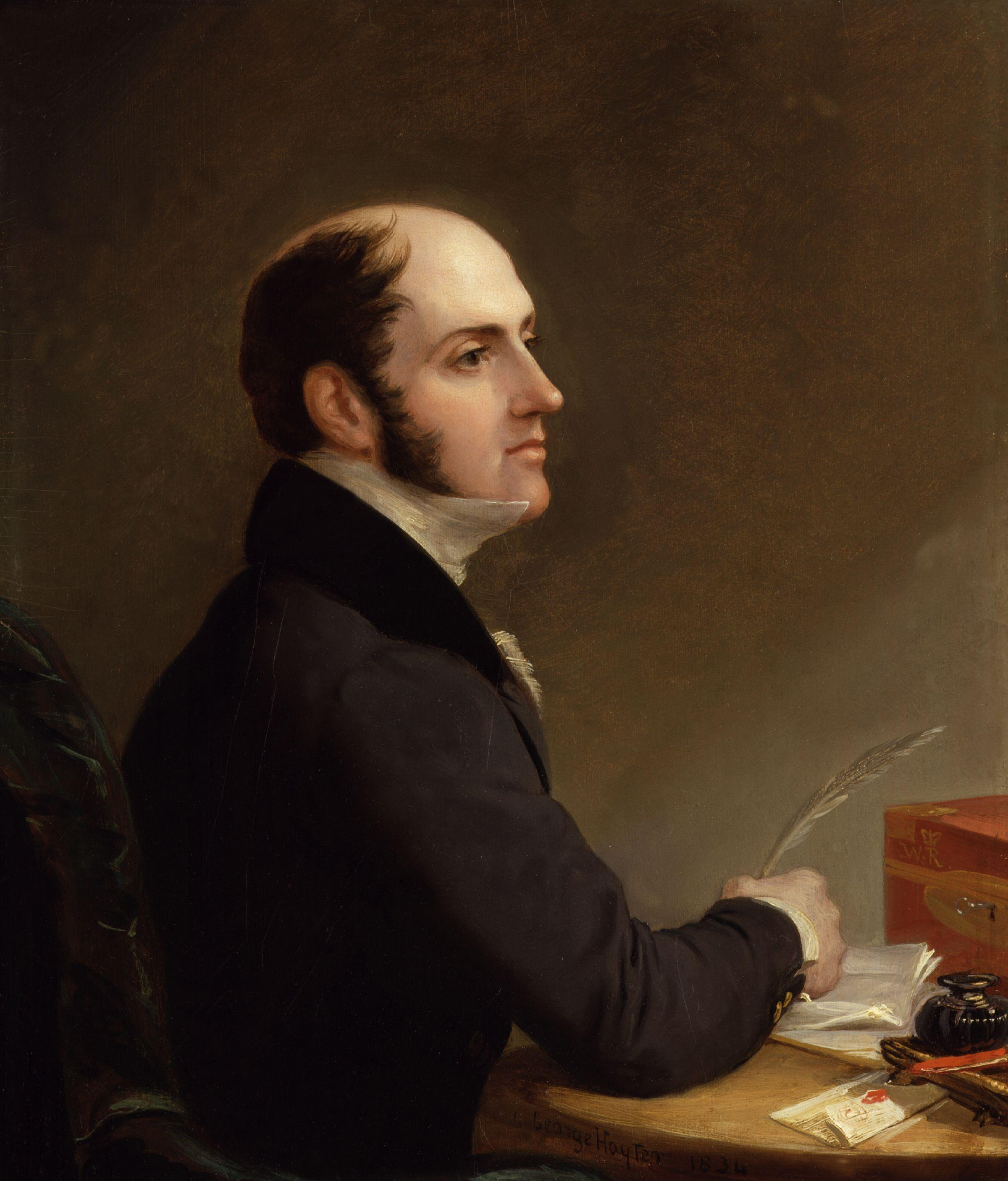
Edward Littleton, 1st Baron Hatherton

Baron Hatherton, of Hatherton in the County of Stafford, is a title in the Peerage of the United Kingdom. It was created in 1835 for the politician Edward Littleton, Chief Secretary for Ireland from 1833 to 1834. Born Edward Walhouse, he assumed in 1812 by Royal licence the surname of Littleton in lieu of his patronymic on succeeding to the estates of his great-uncle Sir Edward Littleton, 4th and last Baronet, of Teddesley Hall. He was also heir to the substantial Walhouse estates and interests, which included Hatherton Hall, near Cannock, then in an exclave of Wolverhampton. His wealth was based upon landed estates centred on Penkridge in southern Staffordshire, mines at Great Wyrley and Bloxwich, quarries and sandpits, brick yards and residential housing, mainly in Walsall.

Lord Hatherton was succeeded by his son, Edward Richard, the second Baron, who represented Walsall in the House of Commons as a Liberal. His son, the third Baron, notably served as Military Secretary to the Governor General of Canada between 1875 and 1879. The title followed the line of his eldest son, the fourth Baron, until the death of the latter's third son, the seventh Baron, in 1985. The late Baron was succeeded by his first cousin once removed, the eighth and (As of 2010) present holder of the title. He is the grandson of Lieutenant-Colonel the Hon. Charles Christopher Josceline Littleton, third son of the third Baron.

In 1919, the 3rd Baron Hatherton disposed of large estates in the Penkridge area. In many cases, farms were sold to their tenants. The 5th Baron Hatherton made even larger disposals of landed property, selling over 1,520 acres (6.2 km^{2}) at Penkridge and 2,976 acres (12.04 km^{2}) in Teddesley Hay in 1953, including the 18th century seat, Teddesley Hall.

== Baron Hatherton (1835) ==
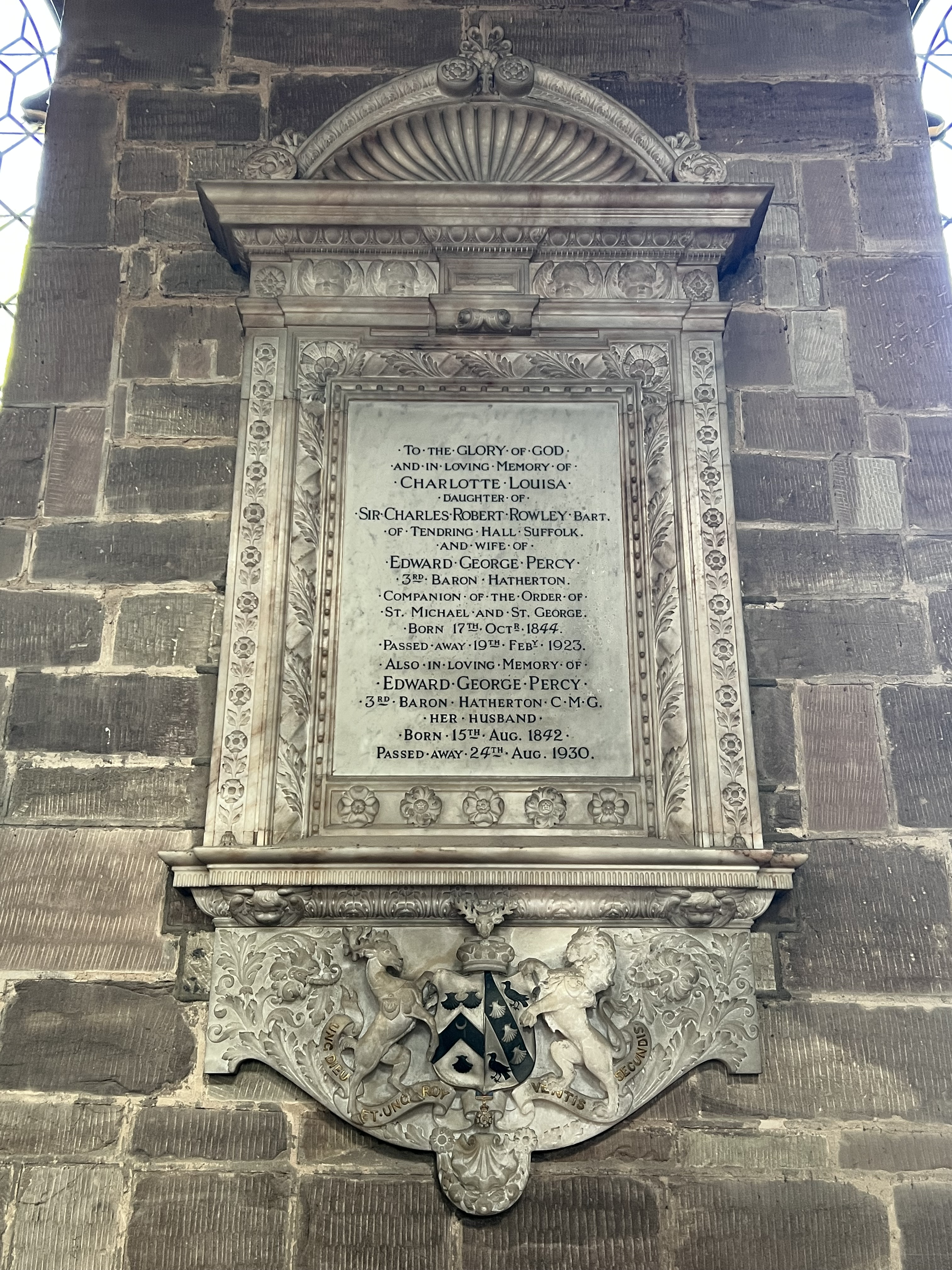
Memorial in Penkridge Church to Charlotte Louisa Percy and Edward George Percy, 3rd Baron Hartheron

- Edward John Littleton, 1st Baron Hatherton (1791–1863)
- Edward Richard Littleton, 2nd Baron Hatherton (1815–1888)
- Edward George Littleton, 3rd Baron Hatherton (1842–1930) served as Military Secretary to the late Earl of Dufferin, Governor-General of Canada in 1877. He and his wife, Charlotte Louisa, daughter of Sir Charles Robert Rowley, 4th Baronet, were parents of the 4th Baron.
- Edward Charles Rowley Littleton, 4th Baron Hatherton (1868–1944)
- Edward Thomas Walhouse Littleton, 5th Baron Hatherton (1900–1969)
- John Walter Stuart Littleton, 6th Baron Hatherton (1906–1973)
- Thomas Charles Tasman Littleton, 7th Baron Hatherton (1907–1985)
- Edward Charles Littleton, 8th Baron Hatherton (b. 1950)

The heir apparent and last in line to the barony is the present holder's son, the Hon. Thomas Edward Littleton (b. 1977).

The family vault is beneath the altar area of St. Michael's church, Penkridge.

== See also ==
- Littleton baronets of Pillaton Hall
