= Mary Wood, Viscountess Halifax =

The Right Honourable The Viscountess Halifax CI
- Born: May 3, 1807
- Died: July 6, 1884 (aged 77)
- Spouse: Charles Wood
- Children: 5
- Father: Charles Grey, 2nd Earl Grey

Mary Wood, Viscountess Halifax (3 May 1807 – 6 July 1884), formerly Mary Grey, was an English noblewoman. She was the wife of Charles Wood, 1st Viscount Halifax, and the mother of Charles Lindley Wood, 2nd Viscount Halifax.

She was born the fifth and youngest surviving daughter of Charles Grey, 2nd Earl Grey. She married Charles Wood, MP, on 30 July 1829, and they had seven children:

- Hon Blanche Edith Wood (d. 21 July 1921), who married Colonel the Hon Henry William Lowry-Corry (1845–1927), son of Armar Lowry-Corry, 3rd Earl Belmore, and had children
- Hon Alice Louisa Wood (d. 3 June 1934), who married the Hon. John Charles Dundas, MP, and had children
- Charles Lindley Wood, 2nd Viscount Halifax (1839–1934), who married Lady Agnes Elizabeth Courtenay, daughter of William Courtenay, 11th Earl of Devon, and had children
- Hon Emily Charlotte Wood (1840–1904), who married Hugo Francis Meynell-Ingram (1822–1871) and had no children
- Capt Hon Francis Lindley Wood, RN (1841–1873)
- Lt Col Hon Henry John Lindley Wood (1843–1903), who married Laura Adeline Thellusson and had one child
- Fredrick George Lindley Wood (later Meynell) (1846–1910), who married Lady Mary Susan Félicie Lindsay and had children

The family had residences at Belgrave Square in London and Hickleton Hall in South Yorkshire. In 1878 Viscountess Halifax was admitted by Queen Victoria to the Imperial Order of the Crown of India, which was instituted in that year.

Viscountess Halifax died at the age of 76. Her husband outlived her by one year, and was succeeded by their eldest son.
