= HMS Wasp (1850) =

Sloop of the Royal Navy

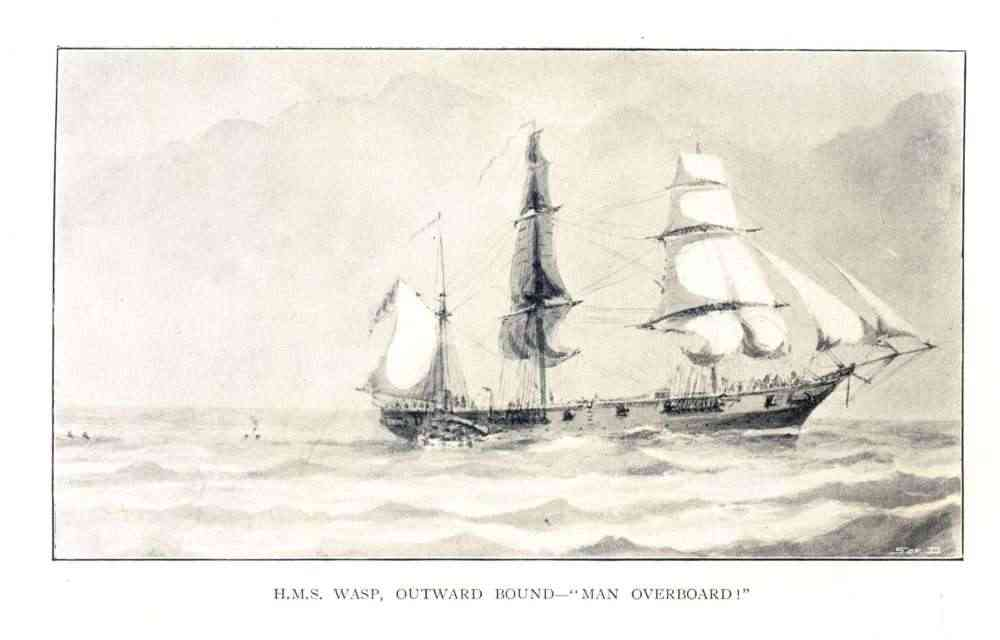
- HMS Wasp in 1860

History

United Kingdom
- Name: HMS Wasp
- Ordered: 25 April 1847
- Builder: Deptford dockyard
- Cost: £33,521
- Laid down: October 1847
- Launched: 28 May 1850
- Commissioned: 5 October 1850
- Honours and awards: Black Sea 1854 = 55
- Fate: Broken up 2 December 1869

General characteristics
- Type: Screw sloop
- Displacement: 1,337 tons
- Tons burthen: 97040/94 bm
- Length: 186 ft 4 in (56.8 m) gundeck; 162 ft 6 1/4 in (49.5 m) keel reported for tonnage
- Beam: 33 ft 10 in (10.3 m) maximum, 33 ft 6 in (10.2 m) reported for tonnage
- Draught: 14 ft 3/4 in (4.3 m) mean
- Depth of hold: 19 ft 0 in (5.8 m)
- Installed power: 100 nhp, 280 ihp (210 kW)
- Propulsion: 2-cylinder vertical oscillating single-expansion steam engine; Single screw
- Sail plan: Full-rigged ship
- Complement: 170
- Armament: 2 × 68-pounder (87 cwt) guns; 10 × 32-pounder (42cwt) guns

HMS Wasp was an Archer type sloop ordered on 25 April 1847 from Deptford Dockyard. Two references stipulate that Parthian, ordered with Archer the year prior was renamed Wasp when ordered as a sloop. However, Parthian remained on the books at Deptford, as a Rifleman type gunvessel until cancelled in June 1849. Therefore Wasp was a new build. She served on many different stations during her career, including West Coast of Africa, in the Mediterranean and Black Sea during the Russian War of 1854 - 55, on the South East Coast of America, Cape of Good Hope where she went aground twice and the East Indies before being sold for breaking in December 1869.

Wasp was the seventh named vessel since it was introduced for a 8-gun sloop launched by Portsmouth Dockyard on 4 July 1749, and sold on 4 January 1781.

Parthian was the second named vessel since it was introduced for a 16=gun brig sloop of the Cherokee class, launched by Bernard of Deptford on 13 February 1808 and wrecked off the coast of Egypt on 15 May 1828.

== Construction ==
Wasp was laid down during October 1847 and launched on 28 May 1850. She was completed for sea on 26 October 1850 at Woolwich. Her first cost was £33,521.

The trial runs for Wasp, her engine generated 280 indicated horsepower (210 kW) for a speed of 8.178 knots (15.146 km/h; 9.411 mph).

== Commissioned Service ==
=== First Commission ===
Her first commission was on 5 October 1850 under Commander William P. Crozier, RN for service on the West Coast of Africa. After Commander Crozier was invalided, Commander Charles W. Bonham, RN (acting) took command on 16 April 1852. In August 1852 under the command of Lieutenant Samuel Pritchard, RN (acting), she returned to Home Waters. On 20 August 1852 Lord John Hay took command for service in the Mediterranean. In 1854 she moved with the British Fleet to the Black Sea for the duration of the Russian War. On 2 February 1855 she returned to the Mediterranean under the command of Commander Henry Lloyd, RN. At the end of 1855 she returned to Home Waters paying off at Sheerness on 7 January 1856.

=== Second Commission ===
On 18 July 1856 she was commissioned under Commander Frederick H. Stirling, RN for service on the East Coast of South America. She returned to Home Waters to pay off at Sheerness on 9 April 1860.

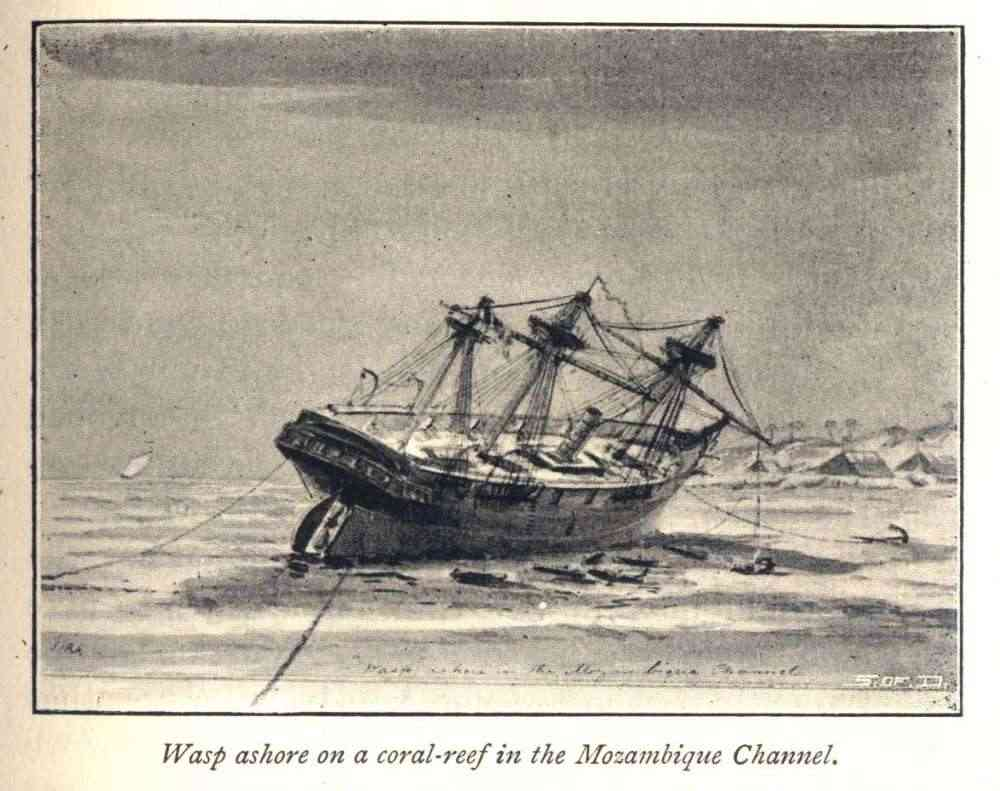
Wasp aground south of Cape Delgado in 1861

=== Third Commission ===
She was recommission the next day on 10 April 1860 under command of Commander Charles Stirling, RN for service on the Cape of Good Hope. She ran aground twice during the commission, once between Table Bay and Simon's Town in South Africa on 25 August 1860, which required a docking in Mauritius, and again off the coast of modern-day Mozambique, about 35 nautical miles (65 km; 40 mi) south of Cape Delgado in late January 1861. She was aground for a week or more, and the damage to the engines precluded their use for the rest of the commission. She returned to Home Waters and paid off at Portsmouth on 10 December 1861.

=== Fourth Commission ===
On 16 November 1863, she commissioned under Captain William Bowden, RN for service in the East Indies. She captured an Arab Slaver off Zanzibar on 2 May 1865. Captain Normand B. Bedingfeld, RN took command on 29 January 1866. She returned to Home Waters in early 1868.

=== Disposition ===
Upon her arrival in Home Waters, she paid off at Portsmouth on 22 April 1868. She was sold to Charles Marshall on 2 December 1869 and broken in Plymouth.

HMS Wasp was awarded the Battle Honour Black Sea 1854 – 55.
