= Cabo Delgado =

Cabo Delgado may refer to:

- Cape Delgado, a cape on the border of Mozambique and Tanzania
- Cabo Delgado Province, Mozambique
