= Lord John Hay (Royal Navy officer, born 1827) =

Royal Navy Admiral of the Fleet and politician (1827–1916)

Admiral of the Fleet Lord John Hay GCB
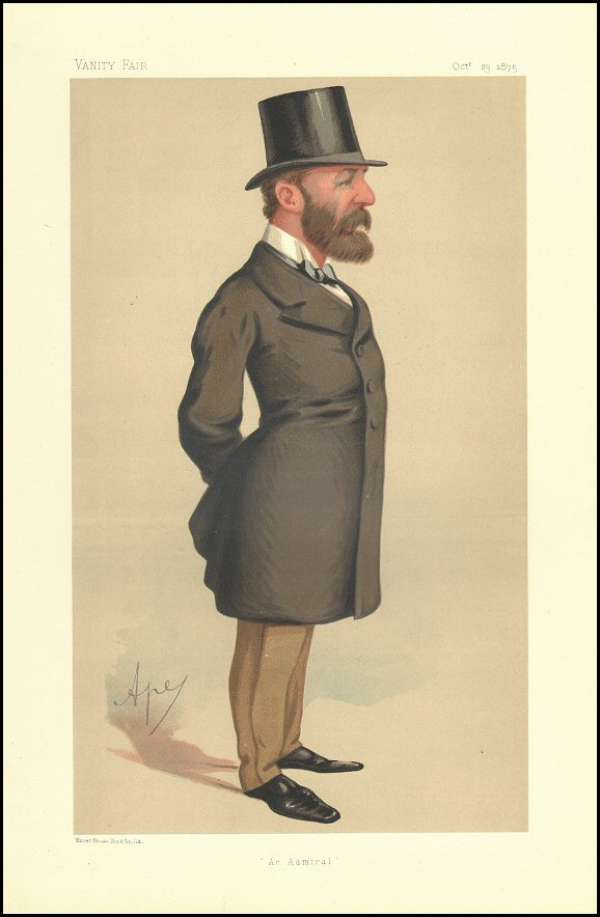
- A Vanity Fair caricature of Admiral of the Fleet Lord John Hay
- Born: 23 August 1827; Geneva, Switzerland
- Died: 4 May 1916 (aged 88); Fulmer, Buckinghamshire
- Relatives: George Hay, 8th Marquess of Tweeddale (father); Nathaniel Lambert (father-in-law)
- Military career
- Allegiance: United Kingdom
- Branch: Royal Navy
- Service years: 1840–1892
- Rank: Admiral of the Fleet
- Commands: Plymouth Command; First Naval Lord; Mediterranean Fleet; Channel Squadron; HMS Hotspur; HMS Odin; HMS Forth; HMS Wasp
- Conflicts: First Opium War; Crimean War; Second Opium War
- Awards: Knight Grand Cross of the Order of the Bath; Order of the Medjidie, 4th Class (Ottoman Empire)

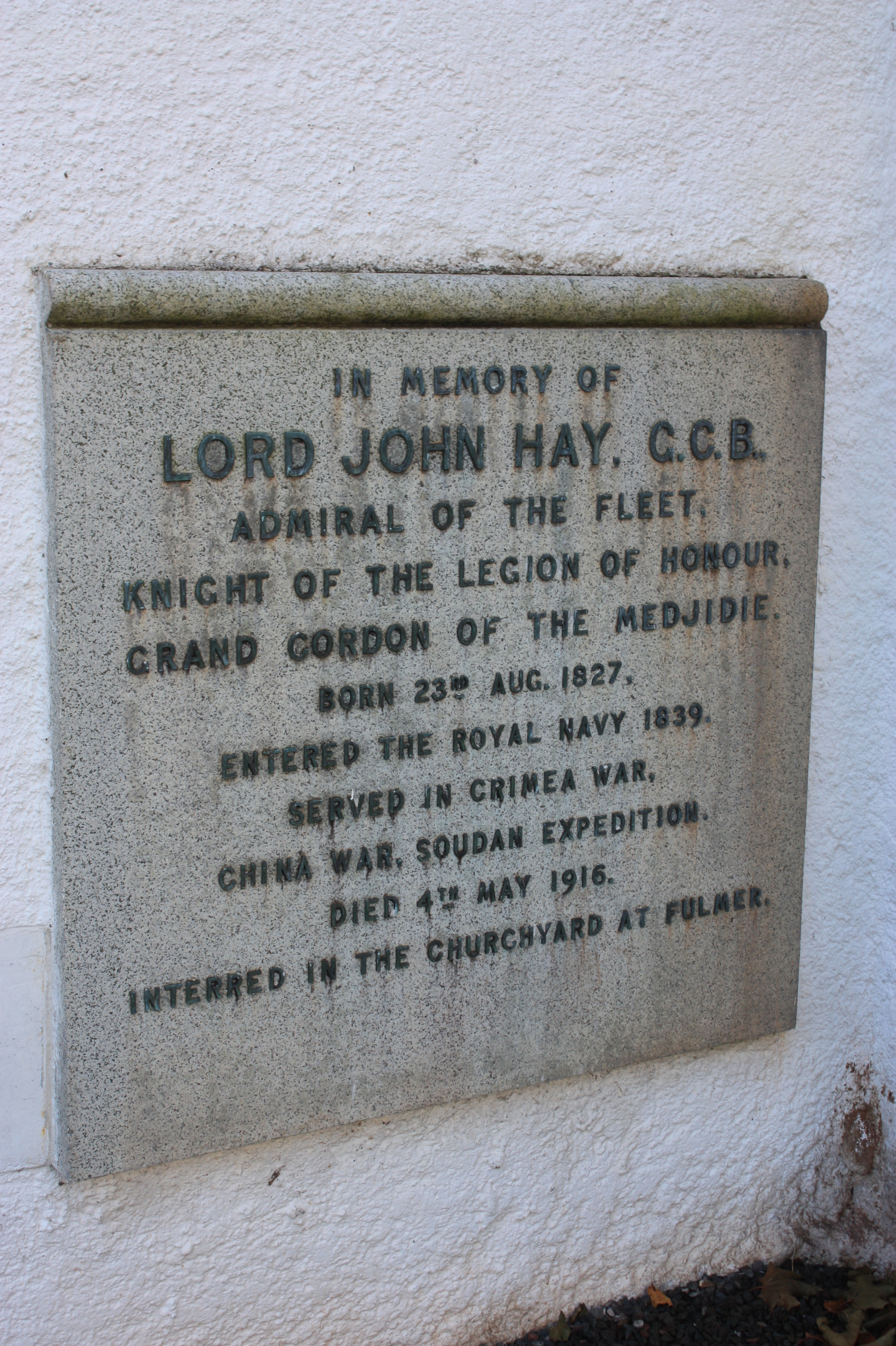
Memorial to Lord John Hay, Admiral of the Fleet, Gifford

Admiral of the Fleet Lord John Hay, GCB (23 August 1827 – 4 May 1916) was a Royal Navy officer and politician. After seeing action in 1842 during the First Opium War, he went ashore with the Naval Brigade and took part in the defence of Eupatoria in November 1854 and the Siege of Sevastopol in spring 1855 during the Crimean War. He also took part in the Battle of Taku Forts in August 1860 during the Second Opium War. As a politician, he became Member of Parliament for Wick and later for Ripon. He was sent to the Mediterranean in July 1878 to take control of Cyprus and to occupy it in accordance with decisions reached at the Congress of Berlin. In a highly political appointment, he was made First Naval Lord in March 1886 when the Marquis of Ripon became First Lord of the Admiralty but had to stand down just five months later when William Gladstone's Liberal government fell from power in August 1886.

== Early career ==
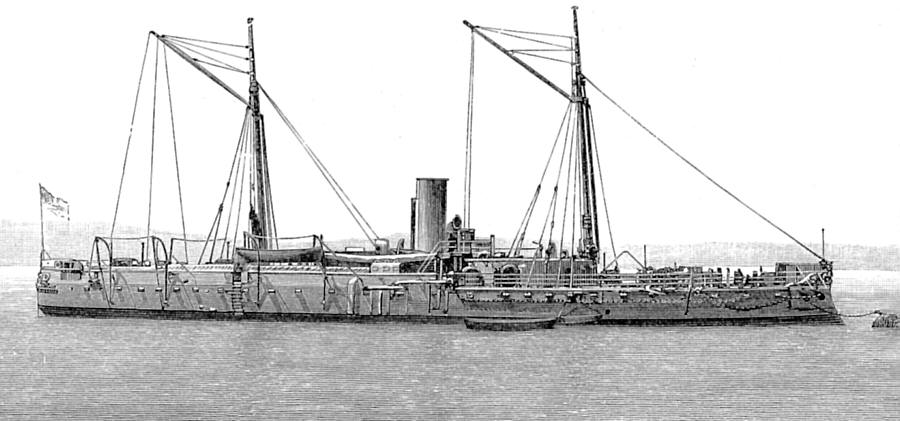
The ironclad ram HMS Hotspur which Hay commanded

Born in Geneva, Switzerland, the fourth son of George Hay, 8th Marquess of Tweeddale and Lady Susan Montagu (daughter of the William Montagu, 5th Duke of Manchester), Hay joined the Royal Navy in 1840. He was posted to the sixth-rate HMS Vestal on the China Station in 1842 and saw action during the First Opium War. Promoted to lieutenant on 19 December 1846, he joined the steam frigate HMS Spiteful at Woolwich that month before transferring to the second-rate HMS Powerful in the Mediterranean Fleet in April 1848. He was promoted to commander on 28 August 1851 and given command of the sloop HMS Wasp in the Mediterranean Fleet in August 1852; he went ashore with the Naval Brigade and took part in the defence of Eupatoria in November 1854 and the Siege of Sevastopol in Spring 1855 during the Crimean War. He was wounded in the latter engagement and was appointed to the French Legion of Honour, 5th Class and the Turkish Order of the Medjidie, 4th class for his services in the Crimea.

Promoted to captain – in recognition of his services at Eupatoria – on 27 November 1854 and, having been appointed a Companion of the Order of the Bath on 5 July 1855, Hay was given command of the fifth-rate HMS Forth in December 1855. Entering politics, he became Whig Member of Parliament for Wick in the 1857 general election and served his constituents there until the 1859 general election. Returning to sea, he became Captain of the paddle frigate HMS Odin on the East Indies and China Station in September 1859 and took part in the Battle of Taku Forts in August 1860 during the Second Opium War. From 1861 he served as commodore on the East Indies and China Station.

Hay became Member of Parliament for Ripon in April 1866 and served as Civil Lord of the Admiralty until the Liberal government fell in June 1866; he went on to be Junior Naval Lord in December 1868. He resigned his seat in Parliament in February 1871 and was given command of the ironclad ram HMS Hotspur.

== Senior command ==
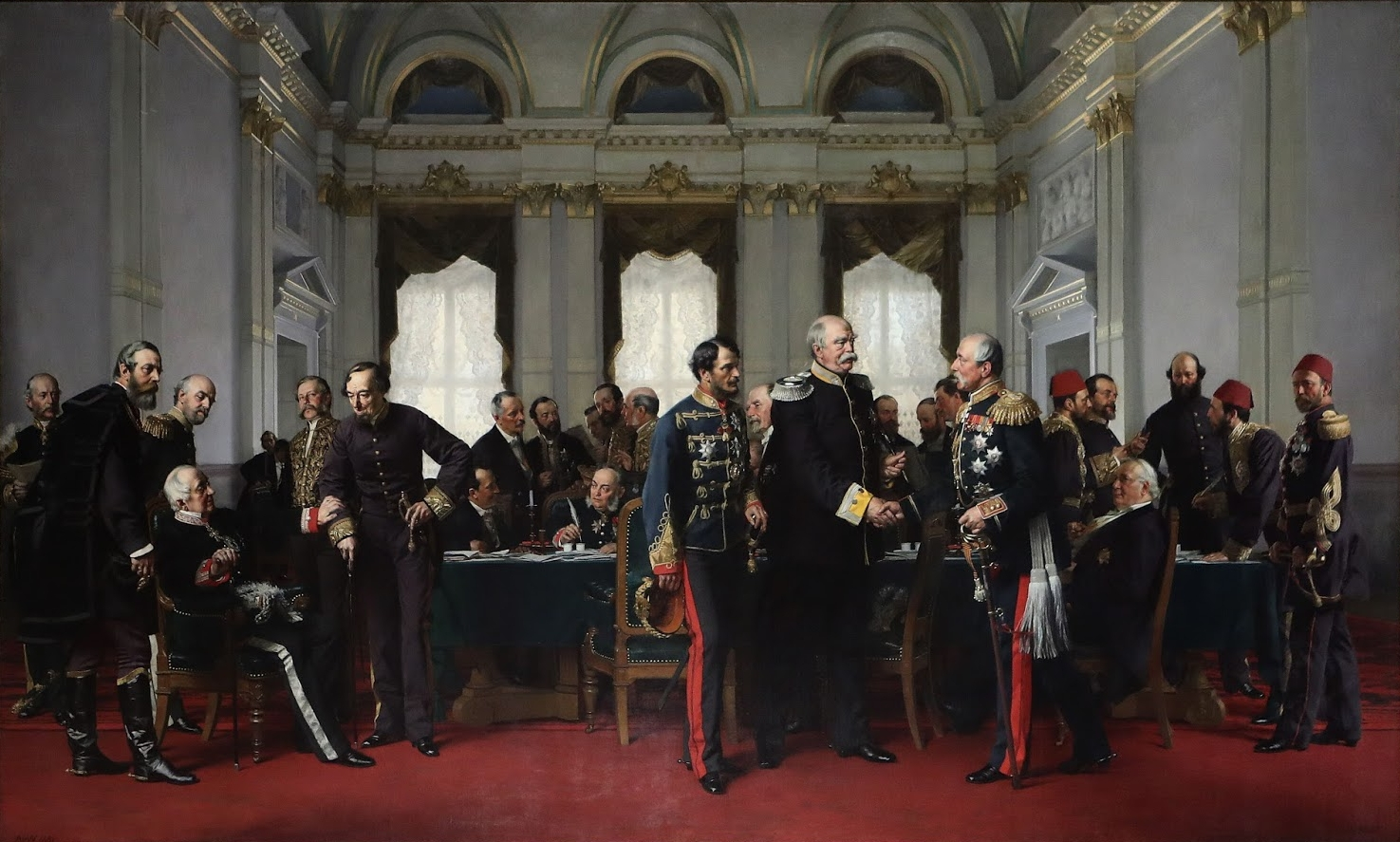
The Congress of Berlin: Lord John Hay was sent to the Mediterranean to take control of Cyprus and to occupy it in accordance with decisions reached at the Congress.

Promoted to rear admiral on 7 May 1872, Hay became Second-in-command of the Channel Squadron in January 1875, hoisting his flag in ironclad battleship HMS Northumberland and then the ironclad battleship HMS Black Prince, and then became Commander-in-Chief of the Channel Squadron, hoisting his flag in the armoured frigate HMS Minotaur, in November 1877. Promoted to vice-admiral on 31 December 1877, he was sent to the Mediterranean in July 1878 to take control of Cyprus and to occupy it in accordance with decisions reached at the Congress of Berlin.

Hay became Second Naval Lord in April 1880 and, having been advanced to Knight Commander of the Order of the Bath on 24 May 1881, he went on to be Commander-in-Chief, Mediterranean Fleet, hoisting his flag in the central battery ship HMS Alexandra in February 1883. He was promoted to full admiral on 8 July 1884 and, in his role as Commander-in-Chief, provided support for the Nile Expedition to relieve Major General Charles Gordon.

In a highly political appointment, Hay was made First Naval Lord in March 1886 when the Marquess of Ripon became First Lord of the Admiralty but had to stand down just five months later when William Gladstone's Liberal government fell from power in August 1886. He was advanced to Knight Grand Cross of the Order of the Bath on 30 July 1886. He became Commander-in-Chief, Plymouth in May 1887, and having been promoted to Admiral of the Fleet on 15 December 1888, he retired in August 1892. He died at his home, Fulmer Place, at Fulmer in Buckinghamshire on 4 May 1916.

== Family ==
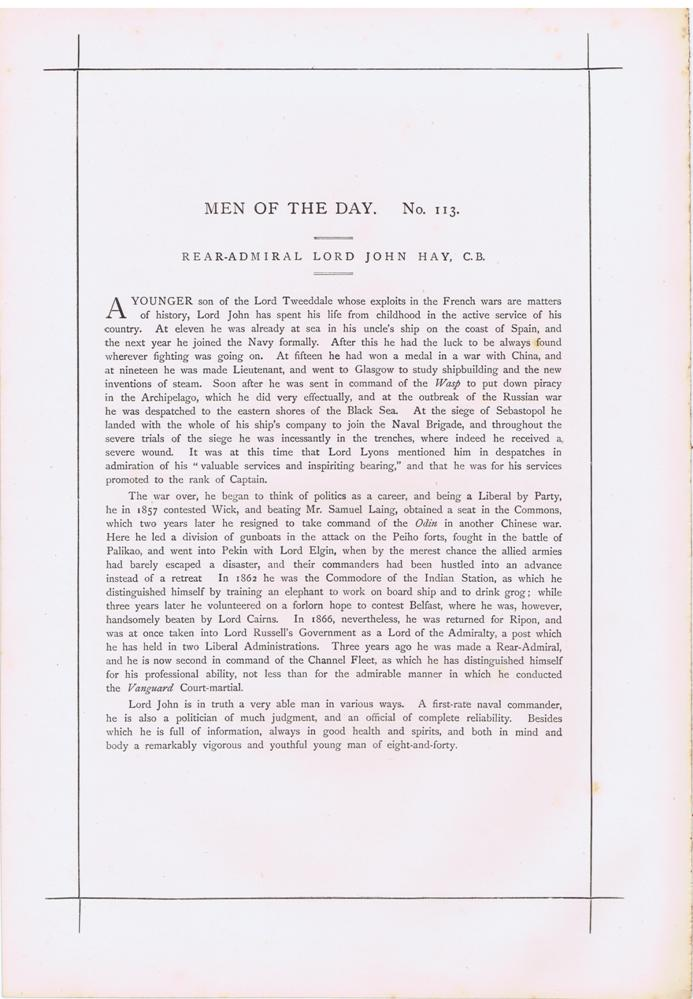
23 10 1875 Vanity Fair text for Admiral John Hay

In 1876 Hay married Christina Lambert, youngest daughter of Nathaniel Grace Lambert, MP, of Buckinghamshire, who represented that constituency as a Liberal from 1868 to 1874; their daughter Minnie Christine Brenda Hay went on to marry Lord Aberdour.

== Sources ==
- Heathcote, Tony (2002). The British Admirals of the Fleet 1734 – 1995. Pen & Sword Ltd. ISBN 0-85052-835-6.
- William Loney RN Career History

Parliament of the United Kingdom
Preceded by Samuel Laing	Member of Parliament for Wick; 1857–1859	Succeeded by Samuel Laing
Preceded by Sir Charles Wood, Bt; Robert Kearsley	Member of Parliament for Ripon; 1866–1871; With: Robert Kearsley 1866–1868	Succeeded by Sir Henry Knight Storks
Military offices
Preceded by Sir John Dalrymple-Hay (As Fourth Naval Lord)	Junior Naval Lord; 1868–1871	Succeeded by Sir John Tarleton
Preceded by Sir Beauchamp Seymour	Commander-in-Chief, Channel Fleet; 1877–1879	Succeeded by Lord Hood
Preceded by Earl of Clanwilliam	Second Naval Lord; 1880–1883	Succeeded by Lord Alcester
Preceded by Sir Beauchamp Seymour	Commander-in-Chief, Mediterranean Fleet; 1883–1886	Succeeded by The Duke of Edinburgh
Preceded by Sir Arthur Hood	First Naval Lord; 1886	Succeeded by Sir Arthur Hood
Preceded by Sir Augustus Phillimore	Commander-in-Chief, Plymouth; 1887–1888	Succeeded by Sir William Dowell
