= Sir Francis Wood, 2nd Baronet =

British landowner and baronet (1771–1846)

Sir Francis Wood Bt
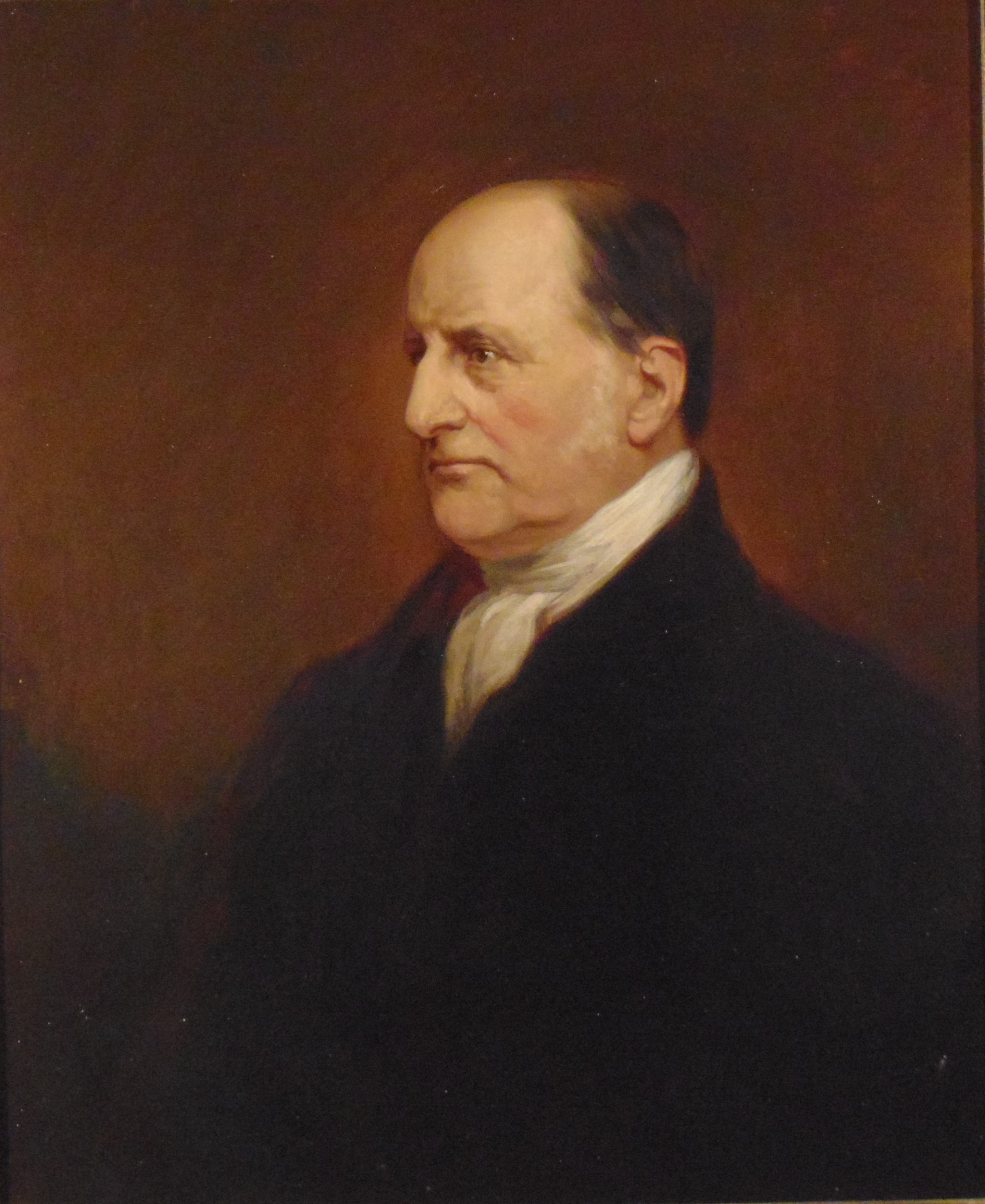
- Wood c. 1815, by H. Broughton
- Born: 16 December 1771
- Died: 31 December 1846 (age 75)
- Burial place: Hickleton
- Occupations: Landowner; High Sheriff of Yorkshire; Vice-Lieutenant of the West Riding of Yorkshire
- Known for: Political influence
- Political party: Whigs
- Children: Charles Wood, 1st Viscount Halifax

Sir Francis Lindley Wood, 2nd Baronet (16 December 1771 – 31 December 1846), was a Yorkshire landowner and political influencer of the nineteenth century. Born the son of a Royal Navy officer, Wood inherited his uncle's baronetcy in 1795. He owned several estates, living at points of his life at Bolling Hall, Hemsworth Hall, and Hickleton Hall. A Whig, Wood was a confidant of Lord Fitzwilliam and supported several Whig parliamentary candidacies, including those of Fitzwilliam's son Lord Milton and Walter Fawkes. An advocate for reform, Wood was a supporter of the abolition of slavery and of the Reform Act 1832. He served as High Sheriff of Yorkshire in 1814 and Vice-Lieutenant of the West Riding of Yorkshire in 1819.

== Life ==
Francis Lindley Wood was born on 16 December 1771, the son of Captain Charles Wood of the Royal Navy and his wife Caroline née Barker. He was the nephew of Sir Francis Wood, 1st Baronet, a wealthy East India merchant. Wood lived at his family seat of Bolling Hall in Yorkshire, and inherited his uncle's baronetcy on 9 July 1795, alongside his estates, which included Monk Bretton. In 1790 Wood sold some of the land of Bolling Hall to Bowling Iron Works for coal and ironstone work, and this so disfigured the landscape of his property that towards the end of the decade Wood moved to Hemsworth Hall, a property left to him by another uncle, the Reverend Henry Wood. He eventually sold the entirety of the Bolling estate to the company. In 1828 he purchased Hickleton Hall after its previous owners were bankrupted by the failure of a local bank; he moved from Hemsworth to Hickleton in 1830. He also owned land in London, and in 1807 he used some of it to build Nelson Square off Blackfriars Road.

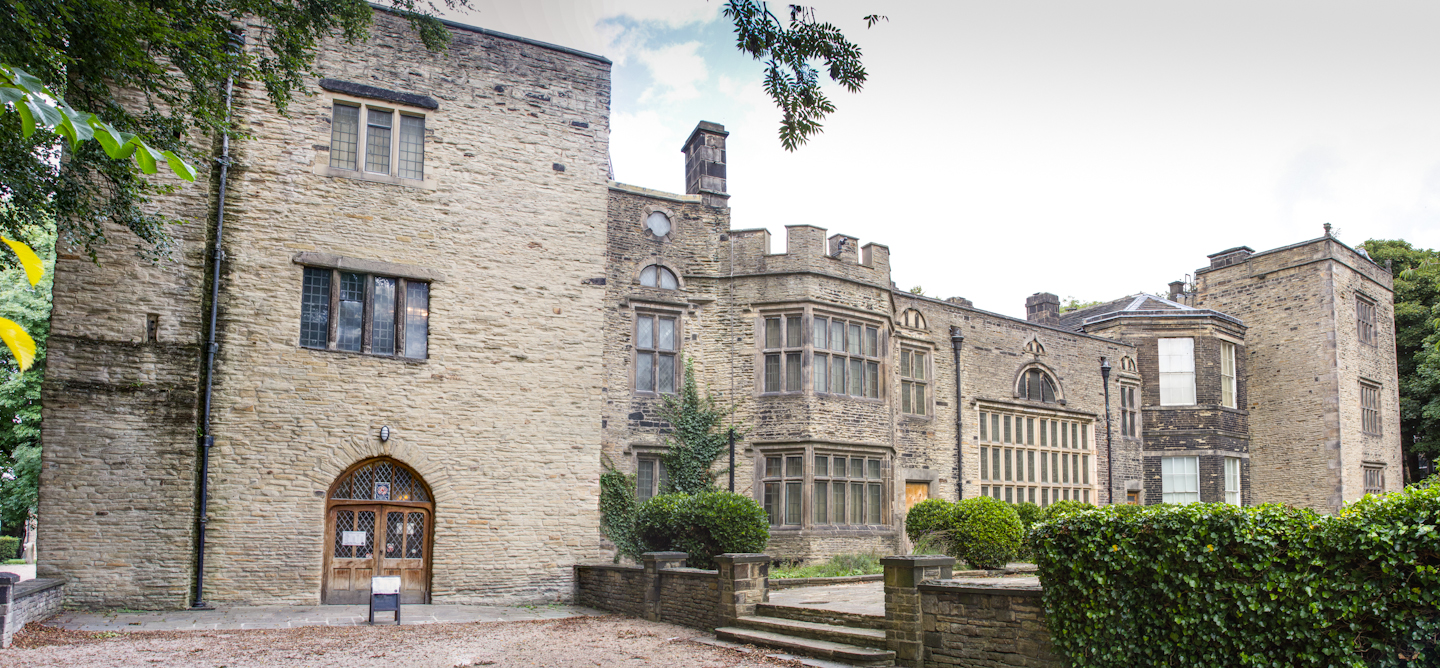
Bolling Hall

While never himself a member of parliament (despite having several opportunities to become such), Wood was one of the leading Whig activists in his county, and through the connections of his uncle was also a close confidant of the Whig Lord Fitzwilliam and his son Lord Milton. (Note: Fitzwilliam unsuccessfully invited Wood to stand as the candidate for Peterborough in 1819.) He used his relationship with Fitzwilliam to secure the parliamentary seat of Great Grimsby for his son Charles in 1826 at the cost of £4,000. Wood subsequently kept up a frequent correspondence with his son as the latter made his way through various parliamentary positions. Through this he advocated for the abolition of slavery, and for the repeal of the Corporation and Test Acts.

Wood also advanced the political positions of others; in 1806 he supported the successful candidacy of Walter Fawkes for the seat of Yorkshire. In the following year he similarly supported Fitzwilliam's son Milton in an election for the same seat, in which he defeated the incumbent Henry Lascelles by only 187 votes. Wood was a great supporter of the Reform Act 1832 and held a large demonstration in York in order to demonstrate his favour for it, going on to be known as the "Father of Reform in the West Riding".

Despite his lack of interest in a parliamentary seat, Wood held positions of importance in his county, becoming High Sheriff of Yorkshire in 1814 and Vice-Lieutenant of the West Riding of Yorkshire in 1819. In his spare time Wood was an avid sportsman, keeping hounds for hunting at Bolling Hall, and was also a vice-president of the Yorkshire Philosophical Society. He died on 31 December 1846, age 75, and was buried at Hickleton.

== Family ==
Wood married Anne Buck (died 11 January 1841), the co-heir of Samuel Buck, Recorder of Leeds, on 15 January 1798. They had three children:

- Charles Wood, 1st Viscount Halifax (20 December 1800 – 8 August 1885), politician created viscount in 1866.
- Anne Wood (27 January 1803 – 24 June 1863), married John Walbanke-Childers in 1824.
- Samuel Francis Wood (1 August 1809 – 22 April 1843).

== Notes and citations ==
=== Citations ===
Baronetage of Great Britain
Preceded by Francis Wood	Baronet of Barnsley; 1795–1846	Succeeded by Charles Wood
