= Reginald Vyner =

British politician (1839–1870)

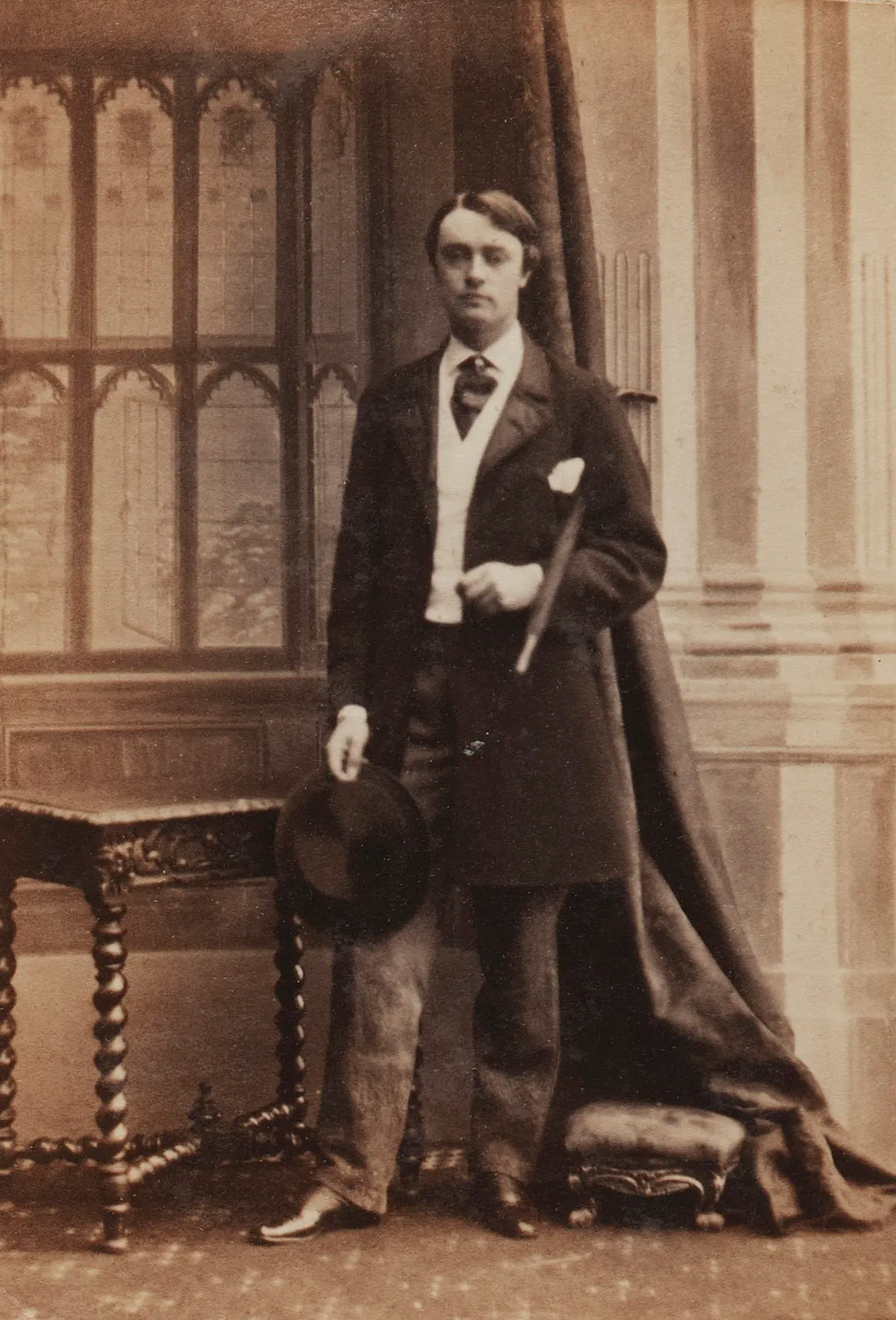
- Portrait by Camille Silvy, 1860

Member of Parliament for Ripon
- In office 22 December 1860 – 12 July 1865 Serving with John Greenwood
- Preceded by: John Ashley Warre; John Greenwood
- Succeeded by: Charles Wood; Robert Kearsley

Personal details
- Born: 10 March 1839
- Died: 28 September 1870 (aged 31)
- Party: Liberal
- Parent(s): Henry Vyner; Mary Gertrude Weddell

Reginald Arthur Vyner (10 March 1839 – 28 September 1870) was a British Liberal Party politician.

Vyner was the son of Henry Vyner and Lady Mary Gertrude Weddell, daughter of Thomas Philip de Grey. He never married.

Vyner was elected MP for Ripon at a by-election in 1860 – caused by the death of John Ashley Warre — and held the seat until 1868 when he stood down.

At some point, Vyner was also a Deputy Lieutenant in Yorkshire.

Parliament of the United Kingdom
Preceded by John Ashley Warre; John Greenwood	Member of Parliament for Ripon; 1860–1865; With: John Greenwood	Succeeded by Charles Wood; Robert Kearsley
