= Listed buildings in Hickleton =

Hickleton is a civil parish in the metropolitan borough of Doncaster, South Yorkshire, England. The parish contains 28 listed buildings that are recorded in the National Heritage List for England. Of these, one is listed at Grade I, the highest of the three grades, three are at Grade II*, the middle grade, and the others are at Grade II, the lowest grade. The parish contains the village of Hickleton and the surrounding area, and all the listed buildings are in the village. The most important buildings are the church, which is listed at Grade I, and the country house of Hickleton Hall, listed at Grade II* Also listed are structures associated with the church, and buildings and items in the grounds and gardens of the hall. The other listed buildings include houses, cottages and associated structures, a farmhouse, farm buildings, a memorial cross, a dovecote, a former school, a smithy, and a telephone kiosk.

== Key ==
Grade	Criteria
I	Buildings of exceptional interest, sometimes considered to be internationally important
II*	Particularly important buildings of more than special interest
II	Buildings of national importance and special interest

== Buildings ==
Name and location	Photograph	Date	Notes	Grade
St Wilfrid's Church; 53.54217°N 1.27256°W		12th century	The church was extended and altered through the centuries, particularly in the late 15th and early 16th centuries, and during the 19th century G. F. Bodley made further alterations. The church is built in limestone with roofs of Welsh slate and sheet metal, and is in Perpendicular style, with embattled parapets and crocketed pinnacles. It consists of a nave and a chancel, both with a clerestory and north and south aisles, a south porch, a north vestry, north and south chapels, and a west tower. The tower has diagonal buttresses, a three-light west window, a clock face, a string course with gargoyles, an embattled parapet with crocketed pinnacles, and a small recessed saddleback roof.	I
Memorial cross 53.54230°N 1.27164°W		Medieval (possible)	The memorial cross to Edward VII was erected in 1910 on a possibly medieval base of five octagonal steps. It has an inscribed plinth of two steps, an octagonal shaft with a crocketed capital, and a stylised cross with a shield on one face and the figure of Christ on the other face.	II
Lych gate, St Wilfrid's Church; 53.54228°N 1.27325°W		Late medieval	The lych gate at the northwest entrance to the churchyard is in limestone, and is in the form of a church's south porch. It has a plinth, a double-chamfered arch, and a coped gable with an apex cross. Inside is a niche containing three human skulls and an inscription.	II
Boundary wall 53.54217°N 1.27424°W	—	Late 16th to early 17th century	The roadside wall is in limestone, it possibly incorporates part of an earlier manor house, and there are projections at the ends and the centre. The end projections have chamfered plinths and quoins. The right projection contains a two-light mullioned window, the narrower central projection has a single-light opening in each return, and the left projection has a rectangular opening with a lintel.	II
30–33 Hickleton Village; 53.54227°N 1.27736°W	—	17th century (probable)	A row of four cottages, later heightened and extended, they are in limestone, with quoins, stone slate eaves courses, and a pantile roof. There are two storeys, four bays, and an outshut. The doorways have moulded surrounds and Tudor arched lintels. The windows are casements with two lights, chamfered surrounds, and mullions, and in the outshut are elongated dormers.	II
Dovecote; 53.54152°N 1.27513°W	—	17th century (probable)	The dovecote is in limestone, with quoins, and a hipped tile roof with a ball finial. It is square, with two storeys and one bay. On the south side is a low door with a chamfered quoined surround and a hood mould, and above it is a small window masked by an iron clock face. Inside are brick nesting holes with stone ledges.	II
Home Farm Court; 53.54175°N 1.27498°W	—	17th century	A group of farm buildings of different dates in stone, with quoins, stone slate eaves, and pantile roofs with coped gables, forming a quadrangular plan. The north range has two storeys, the other ranges have a single storey, and in the courtyard are cart sheds and stables. The openings include doorways, windows, some with mullions, and a dovecote opening, and on the west gable of the north range external steps lead to a doorway in the upper floor.	II
Old School; 53.54210°N 1.27582°W		17th century (probable)	The school, later altered and converted into two dwellings, is in limestone, with quoins, stone slate eaves courses, and a pantile roof. There are two storeys, three bays, a rear wing on the left, and a range parallel to the front. On the front is a porch that has a chamfered quoined doorway with an arched lintel and a coped gable on kneelers. To the left is a doorway with a fanlight and a plain lintel, and the windows are mullioned, with some mullions missing.	II
Castle Hill Farmhouse; 53.54339°N 1.27555°W	—	Late 17th century	The farmhouse, which was remodelled in the 19th century, is in limestone, with quoins, stone slate eaves courses, and a pantile roof with coped gables, shaped kneelers, and finial bases. There are two storeys, and an L-shaped plan, with a main range of four bays, a gabled wing on the left, and a rear outshut. In the angle is a gabled porch with an arched lintel, and the doorway has a chamfered surround and a Tudor arched lintel. The windows are recessed casements with two lights, chamfered surrounds, and mullions.	II
Churchyard cross 53.54202°N 1.27269°W	—	Late 17th century (probable)	The cross base is in the churchyard of St Wilfrid's Church, and is in limestone. It consists of a square column with sunken panels and a cornice. At the top is a shaft flanked by statues of eagles.	II
John O'Gaunts; 53.54241°N 1.27375°W	—	Early 18th century (probable)	A stable with a granary above converted for residential use, it is in limestone, with quoins, a stone slate eaves course, and a pantile roof with coped gables. There are two storeys and an attic, and in the centre is a round-arched entrance with voussoirs. To the left, external steps lead up to a doorway, and the windows are square casements with deep lintels.	II
Hickleton Hall, walls, gate piers and statues 53.54072°N 1.27363°W		1745–48	A country house designed by James Paine, later extended and altered and used for other purposes. It is in limestone with hipped slate roofs, a main range with three storeys and basements, a front of seven bays, five bays on the sides, and flanked by projecting single-storey three-bay pavilions. Between the pavilions and along the front of the house is a single-storey entrance range in sandstone, and to the right is a recessed service wing. At the top of the main range is a modillion cornice and a three-bay pediment containing an achievement of arms. Attached to the house are quadrant walls ending in piers with finials, a retaining wall surmounted by two statues, and containing doorways with pediments and keystones, and end piers with gadrooned plinths and ball finials.	II*
Stable, cottage, walls and gate piers, Hickleton Hall; 53.54164°N 1.27397°W	—	c. 1749	The stable block is in limestone, with an eaves cornice, and hipped roofs of Westmorland slate, stone slate, and tile, and they form a U-shaped plan, closed on the east side by a wall curving to central gate piers. The main range has two storeys and ten bays, the middle three bays recessed under a pediment. In the centre is a round-arched carriage entrance with an impost band, flanked by semi-domed niches in rectangular recesses. Alternate bays have round-arched recesses, and the windows are a mix of sashes and casements. The west range has a pedimented central bay, the north range has two arched entrances, and the cottage at the northeast corner has a garden wall and shield of arms on the end wall.	II*
Ha-ha, urns, gates and gate piers, Hickleton Hall; 53.53999°N 1.27381°W	—	Mid 18th century	The ha-ha encloses the grounds to the south of the hall. It is a coped retaining wall in limestone, with large fluted urns. The wall ramps up to end and gate piers, which are square with cornices. The gates are in wrought iron, and there are steps on the south side.	II
The Brewhouse; 53.54136°N 1.27408°W	—	Mid 18th century	The brewhouse adjacent to Hickleton Hall is in limestone on a plinth, with a continuous impost band, an eaves cornice, and a hipped Westmorland slate roof. There is a single storey and a symmetrical front of three bays. In the centre is a tall round-arched doorway, and the outer bays contain round-arched recesses.	II*
Upper terrace retaining wall and garden house, Hickleton Hall; 53.54069°N 1.27417°W	—	Mid 18th century (probable)	The wall, which is about 3 metres (9.8 ft) high, has central steps flanked by seven recessed panels. There is a coped parapet with a deep band and festooned urns, and the steps are flanked by concrete obelisks. At the north end of the terrace is a garden house that has Ionic pilasters, a pediment with acroteria, and a niche containing a bust.	II
Pedestal with urn in Maze Garden, Hickleton Hall; 53.54046°N 1.27374°W	—	Late 18th century	In the centre of the Maze Garden is a pedestal surmounted by an urn, in limestone. The pedestal is square with a moulded plinth, on it are carved festoons, and above is a cornice. The urn has a gadrooned base and faces in relief, foliage on the body, and semicircular motifs below the rim.	II
37–40 Hickleton Village; 53.54223°N 1.27917°W	—	Late 18th to early 19th century	A row of four limestone cottages, partly rendered, with quoins, stone slate eaves courses, and a pantile roof with coped gables and kneelers. There are two storeys, four bays, and a continuous outshut. The doorways have moulded surrounds and Tudor arched lintels, and the windows are recessed casements with two lights, chamfered surrounds, and mullions.	II
34 and 35 Hickleton Village; 53.54208°N 1.27851°W	—	Early 19th century (probable)	A pair of cottages in limestone with stone slate eaves courses and a pantile roof. There are two storeys and three bays, and at the rear are an outshut, a former cobbler's workshop, and a garage. The doorways have moulded surrounds and Tudor arched lintels. The windows are recessed horizontally-sliding sashes with two lights, chamfered surrounds, and mullions.	II
41 and 42 Hickleton Village; 53.54225°N 1.27948°W	—	Early 19th century (probable)	A pair of houses in limestone with stone slate eaves courses and a pantile roof. There are two storeys and four bays, and a continuous outshut. The doorways have Tudor arched lintels, and the windows are recessed casements with two lights, chamfered surrounds, and mullions.	II
The Forge; 53.54222°N 1.27891°W		Early 19th century (probable)	The smithy is in limestone, with stone slate eaves courses, and a pantile roof with coped gables and kneelers. There are two storeys, two bays, and a single-storey extension recessed on the left, with a hipped roof. The main block has a central doorway with a deep lintel, and the windows are horizontally-sliding sashes. In the extension are two windows and garage doors.	II
Lawn Wood statues and pedestal, Hickleton Hall; 53.53736°N 1.27568°W	—	19th century	In the grounds of the hall, to the south of the house, are three pedestals, two with statues. The pedestals are in stone, each with a moulded plinth and a cornice. On both outer pedestals are statues in cement, one of a male figure, the other female, with some arms missing.	II
Pond and statue, Hickleton Hall; 53.54073°N 1.27568°W	—	19th century (probable)	In the grounds of the hall, to the west of the house, is an oval pond with a statue in the centre. The lining wall of the pond is in limestone with concrete copings. There are three steps to a central square pedestal with sunken panels and a cornice. On the pedestal is the statue of a man standing in front of a lion. The head and arms are missing.	II
19 Hickleton Village; 53.54234°N 1.27476°W	—	Mid to late 19th century	The house is in limestone with stone slate eaves courses and a pantile roof. There are two storeys and attics, and two bays. The central doorway has a moulded surround and an arched lintel. The windows are casements with two lights, chamfered surrounds, and mullions.	II
8 and 9 Hickleton Village; 53.54212°N 1.27488°W	—	Late 19th century	A pair of houses in limestone with stone slate eaves courses and a pantile roof. There are two storeys, and an L-shaped plan, with a main range of three bays, a wing on the left, and a lean-to rear extension. The main doorway has a moulded surround and a Tudor arched lintel. The windows are recessed casements with two lights, chamfered surrounds, and mullions, and in the wing is a canted oriel bay window with a hipped roof.	II
East lodge and gateway 53.54186°N 1.27191°W		c. 1910	The lodge and the gateway at the eastern entrance to the grounds of Hickleton Hall are in limestone. The lodge has a single storey and an attic, and fronts of one and two bays. It has a chamfered plinth band, quoins, an eaves cornice, and a hipped Welsh slate roof. The windows are sashes with moulded sills and triple keystones. The gateway has a round arch with an impost band and a triple keystone. Above it is an open pediment, with pigeon holes and ledges in the tympanum.	II
Wall and balustrade with urns, Hickleton Hall; 53.54071°N 1.27333°W		Early 20th century	The retaining wall to the east of the hall is in limestone, it carries a balustrade in concrete that incorporates two 18th-century urns. The hall has five bays, and a convex bay at each end. The 18th-century urns are at the ends and in limestone; they have gadrooned and fluted vases, and are filled with carved flowers and fruit. The intermediate urns are in concrete and are gadrooned.	II
Telephone kiosk 53.54233°N 1.27492°W	—	1935	A K6 type telephone kiosk, designed by Giles Gilbert Scott. Constructed in cast iron with a square plan and a dome, it has three unperforated crowns in the top panels.	II
