= Charles Wood, 1st Viscount Halifax =

British politician (1800–1885)

The Right Honourable The Viscount Halifax GCB PC
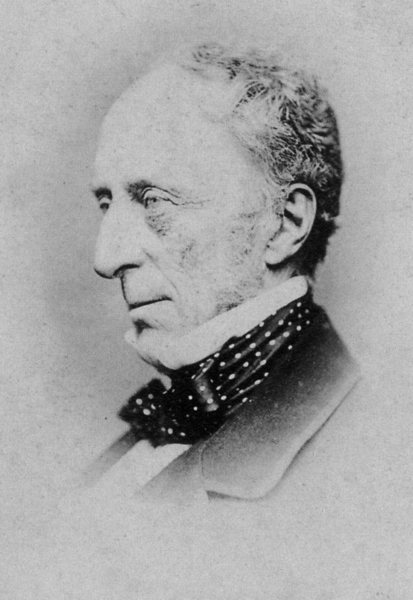

Lord Keeper of the Privy Seal
- In office 6 July 1870 – 17 February 1874
- Monarch: Victoria
- Prime Minister: William Ewart Gladstone
- Preceded by: Earl of Kimberley
- Succeeded by: Earl of Malmesbury

Secretary of State for India
- In office 18 June 1859 – 16 February 1866
- Prime Minister: Viscount Palmerston; Earl Russell
- Preceded by: Lord Stanley
- Succeeded by: Earl de Grey and Ripon

First Lord of the Admiralty
- In office 13 March 1855 – 8 March 1858
- Prime Minister: Viscount Palmerston
- Preceded by: Sir James Graham
- Succeeded by: Sir John Pakington

President of the Board of Control
- In office 30 December 1852 – 3 March 1855
- Prime Minister: Earl of Aberdeen
- Preceded by: John Charles Herries
- Succeeded by: Robert Vernon Smith

Chancellor of the Exchequer
- In office 6 July 1846 – 21 February 1852
- Prime Minister: Lord John Russell
- Preceded by: Henry Goulburn
- Succeeded by: Benjamin Disraeli

First Secretary of the Admiralty
- In office 27 April 1835 – 4 October 1839
- Prime Minister: Viscount Melbourne
- Preceded by: George Robert Dawson
- Succeeded by: Richard More O'Ferrall

Parliamentary Secretary to the Treasury
- In office 10 August 1832 – 14 November 1834
- Prime Minister: Earl Grey; Viscount Melbourne
- Preceded by: Edward Ellice
- Succeeded by: Sir George Clerk

Member of the House of Lords
- Lord Temporal
- In office 22 February 1866 – 8 August 1885
- Preceded by: Peerage created
- Succeeded by: The 2nd Viscount Halifax

Member of Parliament for Ripon
- In office 11 July 1865 – 21 February 1866
- Preceded by: Reginald Vyner
- Succeeded by: Lord John Hay

Member of Parliament for Halifax
- In office 10 December 1832 – 11 July 1865
- Preceded by: New constituency
- Succeeded by: Edward Akroyd

Member of Parliament for Wareham
- In office 2 May 1831 – 12 December 1832
- Preceded by: James Ewing
- Succeeded by: John Hales Calcraft

Member of Parliament for Great Grimsby
- In office 9 June 1826 – 25 July 1831
- Preceded by: William Duncombe
- Succeeded by: John Shelley

Personal details
- Born: 20 December 1800 Pontefract, Yorkshire, England, Kingdom of Great Britain
- Died: 8 August 1885 (aged 84) Hickleton Hall, Doncaster, West Riding of Yorkshire, England, UK
- Party: Whig; Liberal
- Spouse: Lady Mary Grey (d. 1884)
- Children: 7, including Charles Wood, 2nd Viscount Halifax
- Education: Oriel College, Oxford

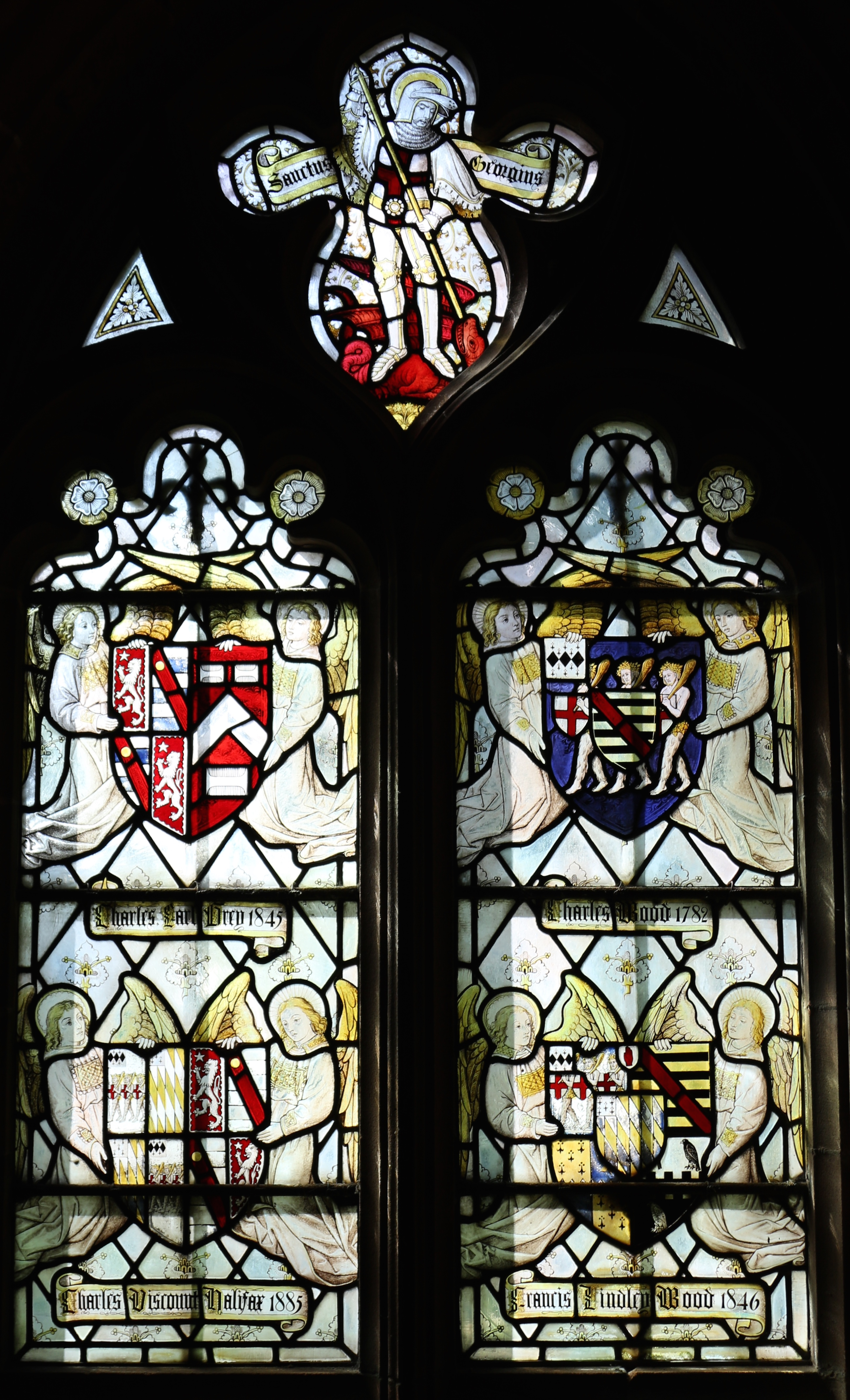
Heraldic memorial window to Grey and Wood family, Church of the Holy Angels, Hoar Cross, Staffordshire.

Charles Wood, 1st Viscount Halifax (20 December 1800 – 8 August 1885), known as Sir Charles Wood, 3rd Baronet, between 1846 and 1866, was a British Whig politician and Member of Parliament. He was Chancellor of the Exchequer from 1846 to 1852, First Lord of the Admiralty from 1855 to 1858, and Secretary of State for India from 1859 to 1866.

== Background ==
Halifax was the son of Sir Francis Wood, 2nd Baronet of Barnsley, and his wife Anne, daughter of Samuel Buck. He was educated at Eton and Oriel College, Oxford, where he studied classics and mathematics.

== Political career ==
A Liberal and Member of Parliament from 1826 to 1866, Wood abandoned the seat of Great Grimsby and was returned in 1831 for the pocket borough of Wareham, probably as a paying guest, which arrangement enabled him to remain in London in preparation for the reading of the Reform Bill. He confided his views to his father:

the reform is an efficient, substantial, anti-democratic, pro-property measure, but it sweeps away rotten boroughs and of course disgusts their proprietors. The main hope therefore of carrying it, is by the voice of the country, thus operating by deciding all wavering votes ... The radicals, for which heaven be praised, support us ...

He voted meticulously for the bill at every stage, and the Reform Act 1832 received royal assent in the following year.

Wood served as Chancellor of the Exchequer in Lord John Russell's government (1846–1852), where he opposed any further help for Ireland during the Great Famine there. In his 1851 budget, Sir Charles liberalized trade, reducing import duties and encouraging consumer goods. This reduction in tariffs led to a noticeable increase in consumption. In the succeeding Tory government, the new Chancellor Benjamin Disraeli, a former protectionist, referred to Wood's influence on economic policy in an interim financial statement on 30 April 1852, setting a trend for the way budgets are presented in the Commons. For Wood, Disraeli was 'petulant and sarcastic', qualities he disliked.

Wood later served as President of the Board of Control under Lord Aberdeen (1852–1855), as First Lord of the Admiralty in Lord Palmerston's first administration (1855–1858), and as Secretary of State for India in Palmerston's second government (1859–1866). He succeeded to his father's baronetcy in 1846, and in 1866 he was elevated to the peerage as Viscount Halifax, of Monk Bretton in the West Riding of the County of York. After the unexpected death of Lord Clarendon necessitated a reshuffle of Gladstone's first cabinet, Halifax was brought in as Lord Privy Seal, serving from 1870 to 1874, his last public office.

== Role in the Irish Famine ==
The Great Famine in Ireland (1845–1851) led to the death of one million people, with a further one to two million emigrating to the Great Britain, United States, Canada, Australia and New Zealand. On 30 June 1846, the Tory government of Sir Robert Peel was replaced by a Whig government led by Lord John Russell. The government sought to embed free trade and laissez-faire economics. Sir Charles Trevelyan, a senior civil servant at the Treasury, in close cooperation with Chancellor of the Exchequer Sir Charles Wood, sought to oppose intervention in Ireland. Extreme parsimony of the British Government towards Ireland while Wood was in charge of the Treasury greatly enhanced the suffering of those affected by famine. Wood believed in the economic policy of Laissez-faire and preferred to leave the Irish to starve rather than "undermine the market" by allowing in cheap imported grain. Wood also shared Trevelyan's anti-Irish, moralistic views, with Wood believing the famine should eliminate the "present habits of dependence", and obliging Irish property to support Irish poverty. Wood wrote to the Lord Lieutenant of Ireland that the famine was not accidental, but willed, and would bring along a social revolution: "A want of food and employment is a calamity sent by Providence", it had "precipitated things with a wonderful impetus, so as to bring them to an early head". He hoped the famine would clear small farmers, and lead to a "better" economic system. Wood gave £200 to the British Relief Association, the same amount as Sir Robert Peel and, amongst politicians, second only behind Lord John Russell, who gave £300.

== Wood's despatch ==
As the President of the Board of Control, Wood took a major step in spreading education in India in 1854, when he sent a despatch to Lord Dalhousie, the Governor-General of India. Wood recommended the following:

1. An education department should be set in every province.
2. Universities on the model of the University of London should be established in large cities such as Bombay, Calcutta and Madras.
3. At least one government school be opened in every district.
4. Affiliated private schools should be given grant in aid.
5. The Indian natives should be given training in the vernacular.

In accordance with Wood's despatch, education departments were established in every province and universities were opened at Calcutta, Bombay and Madras in 1857, as well as in Punjab in 1882 and in Allahabad in 1887..

== Family ==
Lord Halifax married Lady Mary Grey (3 May 1807 – 6 July 1884), fifth daughter of Charles Grey, 2nd Earl Grey, on 29 July 1829. They had four sons and three daughters:

- Hon. Blanche Edith Wood (d. 21 July 1921) married on 21 September 1876, Col. Hon. Henry William Lowry-Corry (30 June 1845 – 6 May 1927), son of Armar Lowry-Corry, 3rd Earl Belmore.
- Hon. Alice Louisa Wood (d. 3 June 1934)
- Charles Lindley Wood, 2nd Viscount Halifax (7 January 1839 – 19 January 1934)
- Hon. Emily Charlotte Wood (1840 – 21 December 1904) married Hugo Francis Meynell-Ingram (1822 – 26 May 1871)
- Capt. Hon. Francis Lindley Wood, RN (17 October 1841 – 14 October 1873)
- Lt Col. Hon. Henry John Lindley Wood (12 January 1843 – 5 January 1903)
- Hon. Fredrick George Lindley Wood (later Meynell) (4 June 1846 – 4 November 1910)

Lady Halifax died in 1884. Lord Halifax survived her by just over a year and died in August 1885, aged 84. He was succeeded in his titles by his eldest son Charles, who was the father of Edward Wood, 1st Earl of Halifax.

Parliament of the United Kingdom
Preceded by William Duncombe; Charles Tennyson	Member of Parliament for Great Grimsby; 1826–1831; With: George Heneage 1826–1830; George Harris from 1830	Succeeded by John Shelley; George Harris
Preceded by John Calcraft; James Ewing	Member of Parliament for Wareham; 1831–1832	Succeeded by John Hales Calcraft
New constituency	Member of Parliament for Halifax; 1832–1865; With: Rawdon Briggs 1832–1835; James Stuart-Wortley 1835–1837; Edward Protheroe 1837–1847; Henry Edwards 1847–1852; Francis Crossley 1852–1959; James Stansfeld 1859–1865	Succeeded by Edward Akroyd; James Stansfeld
Preceded by John Greenwood; Reginald Vyner	Member of Parliament for Ripon; 1865–1866; With: Robert Kearsley	Succeeded by Robert Kearsley; Lord John Hay
Political offices
Preceded by Edward Ellice	Parliamentary Secretary to the Treasury; 1832–1834	Succeeded by Sir George Clerk, Bt
Preceded by George Robert Dawson	First Secretary of the Admiralty; 1835–1839	Succeeded by Richard More O'Ferrall
Preceded by Henry Goulburn	Chancellor of the Exchequer; 1846–1852	Succeeded by Benjamin Disraeli
Preceded by John Charles Herries	President of the Board of Control; 1852–1855	Succeeded by Robert Vernon Smith
Preceded by Sir James Graham, Bt	First Lord of the Admiralty; 1855–1858	Succeeded by Sir John Pakington, Bt
Preceded by Lord Stanley	Secretary of State for India; 1859–1866	Succeeded by The Earl de Grey
Preceded by The Earl of Kimberley	Lord Privy Seal; 1870–1874	Succeeded by The Earl of Malmesbury
Peerage of the United Kingdom
New creation	Viscount Halifax; 2nd creation 1866–1885	Succeeded by Charles Wood
Baronetage of Great Britain
Preceded by Francis Wood	Baronet of Barnsley; 1846–1885	Succeeded by Charles Wood
