= Bowling Iron Works =

Bowling Ironworks
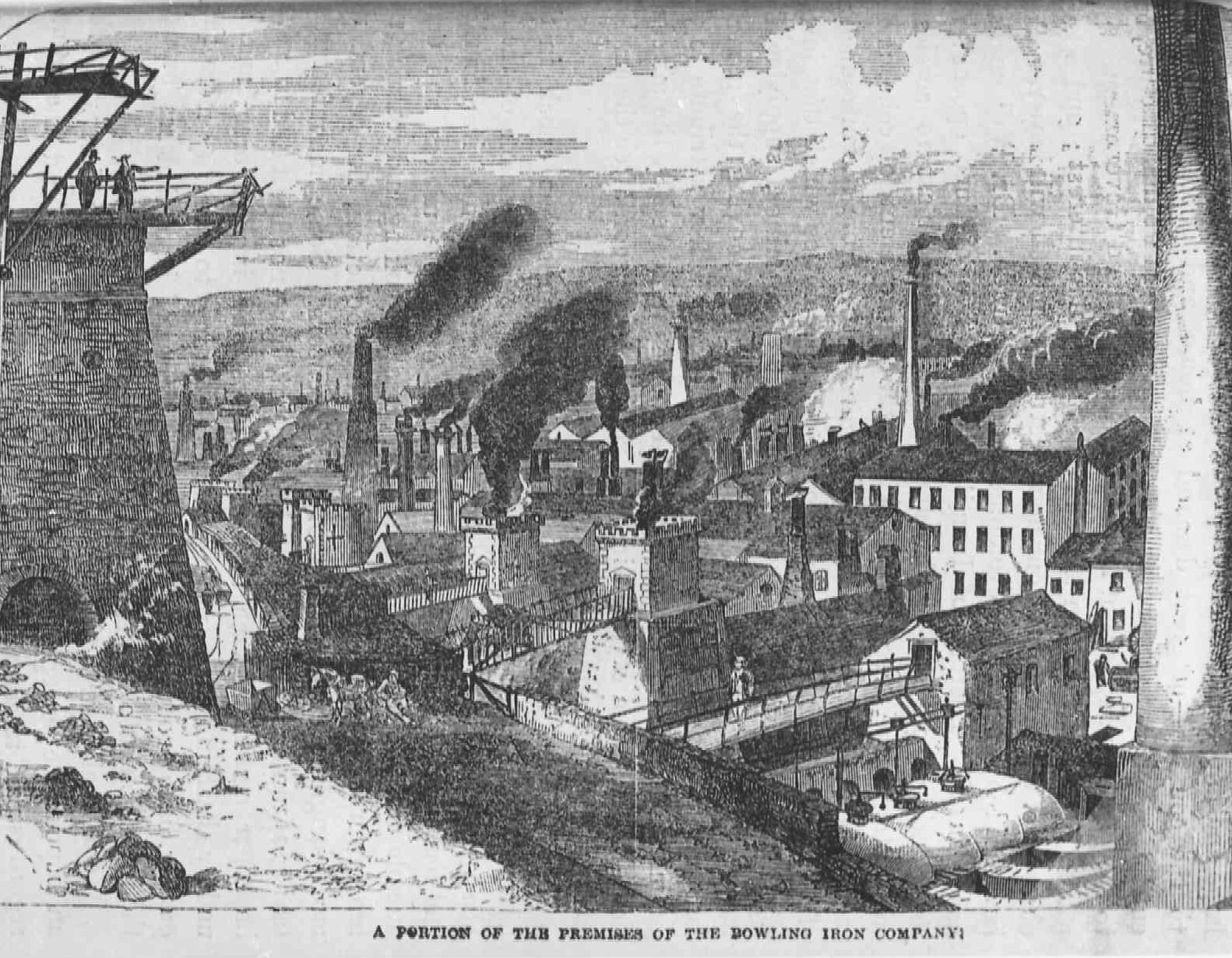
- A part of the works in 1861
- Built: 1784
- Location: Bowling, Yorkshire, England
- Coordinates: 53.783901°N 1.728078°W
- Industry: Ironworking
- Products: Domestic and industrial iron products
- Defunct: 1921

Bowling in West Yorkshire

The Bowling Iron Works was an iron working complex established around 1780 in the district of East Bowling part of the township and manor of Bowling, now in the southeast of Bradford in Yorkshire, England. The operation included mining coal and iron ore, smelting, refining, casting and forging to create finished products.

== Mineral deposits ==
Iron is said to have been worked in the vicinity of Bradford in Roman times. The monks of Rievaulx Abbey to the east were working iron on land owned by their monastery in 1150, and forgemen are mentioned in 1358. Surface coal was being extracted from outcrops and shallow pits by 1360, and coal mines were worked by 1502. The Bowling Ironworks were established in the 1780s to smelt and forge iron from the Black Bed ironstone deposits using coal from the Better Bed seam, both of which lay under the site. The ironstone yields about 32% iron. The Better Bed coal is free of sulfur, making it ideal for furnaces used in smelting, puddling and forging. The Black Bed coal, nearer to the surface, could be sold or used for firing boilers and other purposes.

Mining began in Jeremiah Rawson's estate, then extended into nearby estates as the deposits became exhausted, always mining the same beds of minerals. In 1794 the company purchased from Sir Francis Wood (owner of Bowling Hall and Lord of the Manor) the rights to 90 acres of coal and iron stone in Hall Lane, Broomfields. In 1806 the company purchased additional mineral rights to parts of Sir Francis' Bowling Hall estate. The rights to other land was purchased in later years, often after extensive negotiation. In 1816 the company purchased from Sir Francis all his remaining lands and mineral rights in Bowling and in 1821 purchased from him the Lordship of the Manor.

The same seams of ironstone and coal were exploited by the Low Moor Iron Company, founded in 1788, and then by the Bierley Iron Company from around 1810.

== Foundation ==
The first foundry was established at Bowling around 1784 by a group of businessmen including John Sturges, an ironmaster with works at Wakefield, and Richard Paley (1746-1808), an iron merchant of Leeds. The other partners were John Sturges junior, William Sturges and John Ewell. Ewell left the partnership in 1792. The company took the name of John Sturges & Company.

Iron was brought to the foundry from Wakefield in the early years. The first products were items for domestic use such as laundry irons, ovens, boilers, window sash weights and clock weights. The smelting plant was established in 1788, producing pig iron that was used in the boiler plates for the first steam engine at the Low Moor works. As late as 1792 pig iron was delivered to Wakefield and wrought iron received in exchange. In 1804 the partnership was extended, bringing in George Paley (1779-1865) and John Green Paley (1774-1860) - respectively the son and nephew of Richard Paley - plus Thomas Mason and the Reverend John Simons.

== History ==
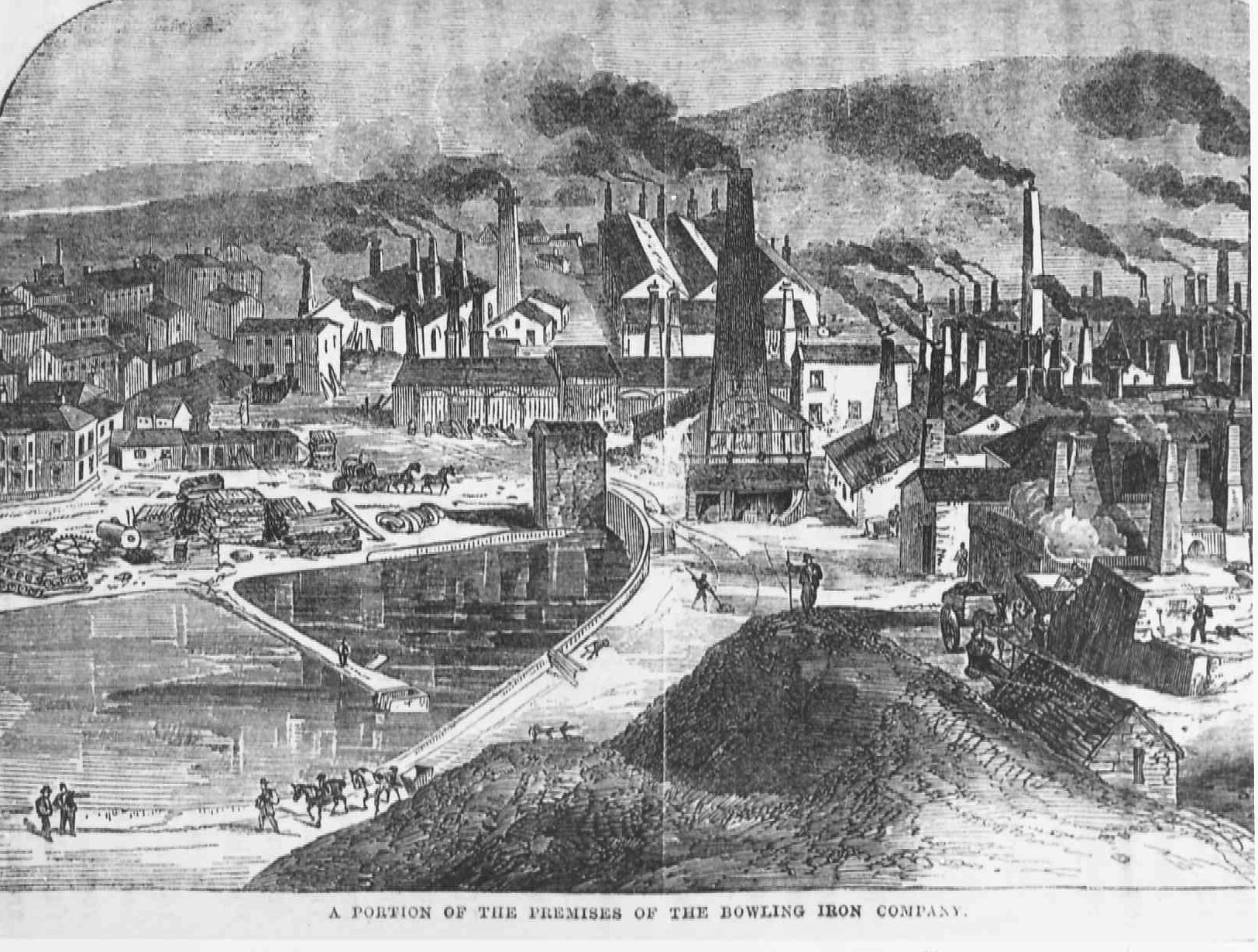
A part of the ironworks in 1861

The Bowling works were selling large quantities of guns, shot and shells to the British government before 1790. Cast iron was used for guns before the invention of wrought iron, and the cast iron guns were subject to rigorous production controls and quality tests. On 27 July 1796 the partners signed an agreement with Matthew Boulton and James Watt to pay royalties on the two steam engines in use at the works, and to be allowed to make additional steam engines at the works, paying royalties. When Sir William Armstrong invented wrought-iron guns, some of the first coils he used were Bowling iron. Bowling iron, or Best Yorkshire, became well known around the world.

Steam hammers were installed at the Bowling Ironworks where the steam cylinder was bolted to the back of the hammer, thus reducing the height of the machine. These were designed by John Charles Pearce, who took out a patent for his steam hammer design several years before James Nasmyth's patent expired. On 14 November 1848 a new partnership was created with the name of Bowling Iron Co., confirmed by act of parliament in August 1849. The company was incorporated and registered in 1870.

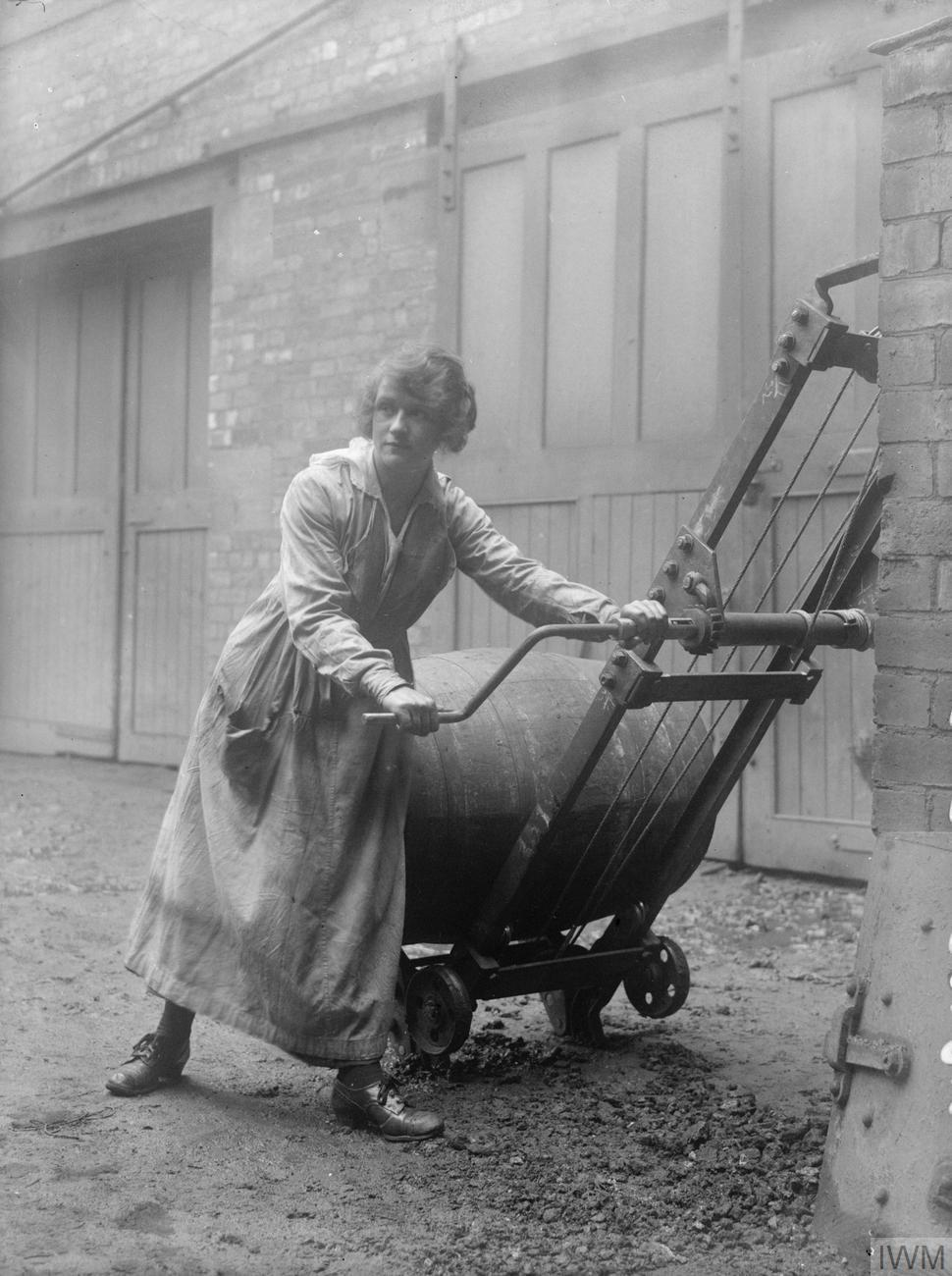
A worker demonstrating a barrel elevator at the Bowling Iron Works, November 1918.

An 1891 description said the ironworks lay in,

a sort of deep horseshoe valley, the banks which surround it consisting chiefly of shale and cinders, the accumulations of a century's workings. The whole area, enclosed by a high stone wall, is somewhat more than a mile and a half round. Looking from the counting-house at the entrance, on the right is a large waste space, with the steaming lake and cinder hills behind. At night, when live scoria and ashes glow from the sides of the latter, and the lake is lighted up by vivid and fitful gleams emitted from the blast furnaces, the scene is strange and weird-like ... one might almost fancy himself in immediate proximity to an active volcano.

The plant at that time included blast furnaces and refineries used in the first stages of iron manufacture, puddling and ball furnaces with high brick or iron chimneys, a shed housing the steam hammers, steelworks, a large machine shop, boiler works, a large foundry and other workshops and buildings. A narrow gauge railway was used to move material within the works, and a line to the Great Northern Railway was used to ship the products. A network of tramways brought minerals from the pits to the works, with wagons pulled by wire ropes powered by stationary engines. Four large pumps were being used to keep the mines dry, with some of the water used in the ironworks.

The Bowling Iron Company went into liquidation in 1898. In 1903 the company was reorganized as The Bowling Iron Company. It was liquidated in 1921.

== Conditions ==
By 1840 Bradford was known for having some of the most smoke-filled air in Britain. As early as 1803 an act had stated that, "Engine chimneys are to be erected of sufficient height as not to create a nuisance by the emission of smoke. All owners of engines etc. are to construct fireplaces thereof in such a manner as most effectually to destroy and consume the smoke arising therefrom." However, little was done to enforce the laws. There was a general feeling that the factories provided work, so should not be pushed too hard to reduce pollution. An 1841 account said, "The condition of Bradford is dreadful. Lowmoor iron-forges most extensively spread their suffocating exhalations on the one side ... On the other side, Bowling Iron Hell (for it is one truly) casts a still denser atmosphere and sulphurous stench..." The Bowling Iron Company was fined on 12 December 1874, but only for £5 with £9. 10s. costs for ten offences. The population suffered high levels of respiratory diseases, peaking in 1890 during an influenza epidemic.

The method of paying the men led them into temptation of intemperance and extravagance: According to H. Hartopp, manager of the Bowling Works,

All our colliers and miners are in our direct employ, without the intervention of contractors. They appoint one of their number, the head man in the pit, to come to the office every week to receive the money. It is given to him in sovereigns and silver, perhaps 20l. or 30l.. There is no need, whatever, that they should go to a public house to divide it, but I believe their practice, too often, is to do so. I have been anxious to put an end to it, by providing them with a convenient room near the collieries, where practicable; but they are scattered and distant.

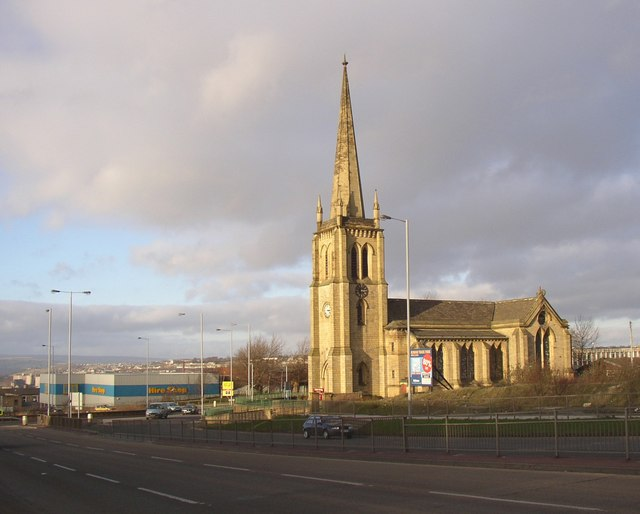
St John's Church, Wakefield Road, Bowling, Bradford, built in 1842 at the expense of the Bowling Iron Company

The company built St. John's Church, Bowling, at its own expense of £5,000. The church was consecrated on 8 February 1842. It is built in the Lancet-Gothic style and is 111 by 60 feet (34 by 18 m) in size, with a 130 feet (40 m) spire. The church was the first to be built in England of iron and stone, with only the rafters made of wood. In April 1847 St. John's school in Bowling was visited. The Bowling Iron company had erected the building, but did not contribute much to its expenses. There were on average 150 children at the school, of whom 12 were factory workers. Only seven children had reached aged 13. The schoolroom had poor lighting and ventilation, and there was no mistress to instruct the older children.

In the mines, hurrier-boys would drag carriages along tracks to the miners, then drag the filled carriages back to the pit shaft and hook them to a chain so they could be pulled up. An 1843 inquiry into child labor said of Jabez Scott, aged fifteen, a worker at the Bowling Iron Works: "Work is very hard; sleeps well sometimes, sometimes is very ill tired and cannot sleep so weel [sic]." An 1847 report noted that there was considerable temptation to employ boys in the mines when they were below the legal age, then ten years of age. "Managers, &c., of mines, complain that the work required of boys in seams of coal not more than 18 inches to two feet thick, is done at a disadvantage, unless they are brought to it from their earliest years."

In 1875 there was an explosion in the Bowling Iron Company's Crosses Pit mine, where 40 men and boys were working. Four ironstone getters and hurriers were killed, and others injured. The cause seems to have been accidental ignition of gunpowder being used to break up large pieces of scale that contained the ironstone. A select committee of the House of Commons in 1877 heard that in West Yorkshire, including the Bowling Iron Works, the colliers employed boys as assistants, rather the boys being employed by the company, although the boys had their names entered and were subject to the colliery rules. At that time Bowling employed about 2,000 workmen in the collieries, and it was estimated that about two men died each year. Accident rates were higher in the iron works, despite employment being lower. Boys were employed in various capacities in the ironworks, such as wheeling hot lumps of puddled iron to the hammers.

== Gallery ==
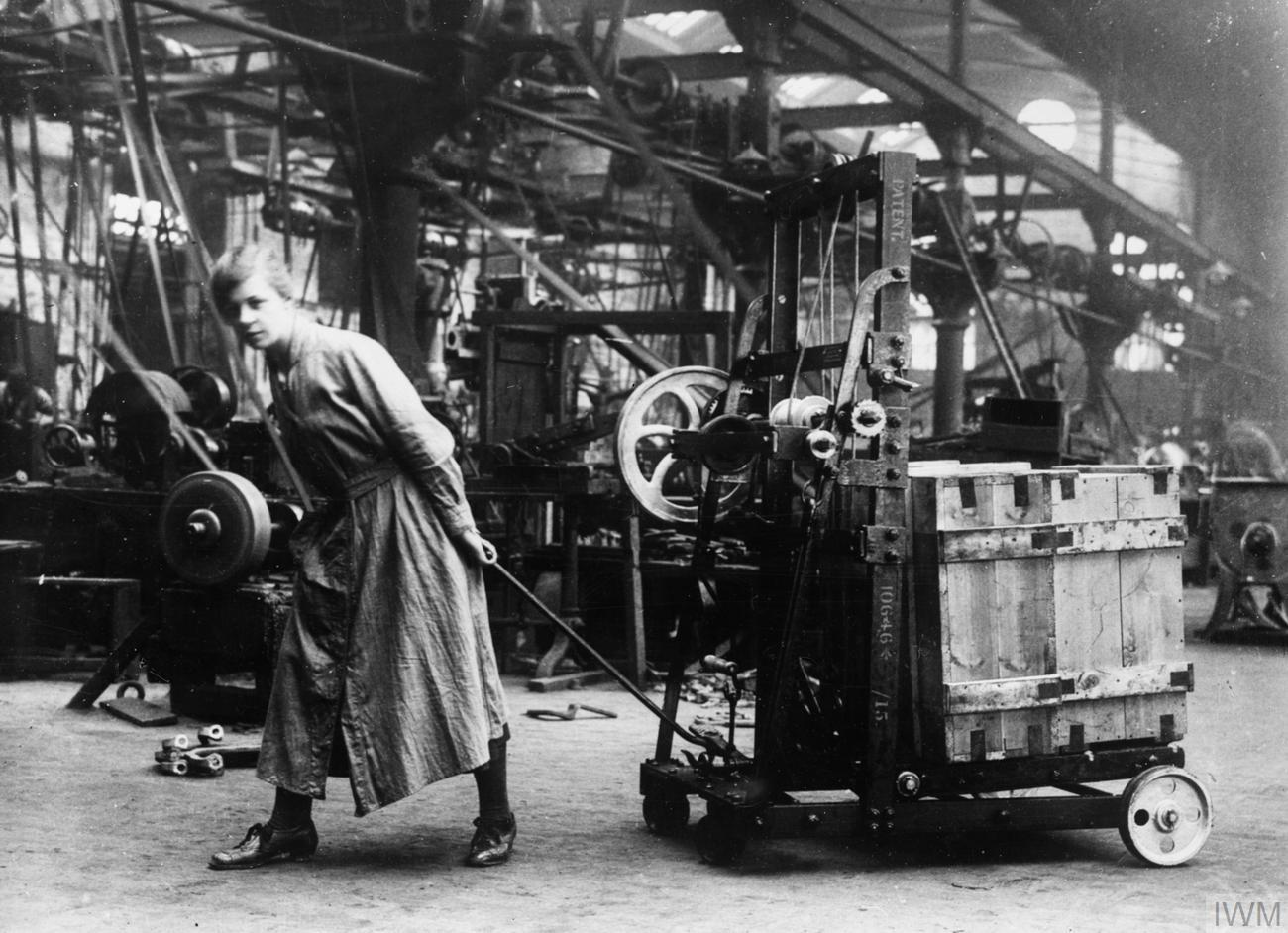
A female worker demonstrates a machine which can lift boxes to save physical labour at the Bowling Iron Works, Bradford, in November 1918

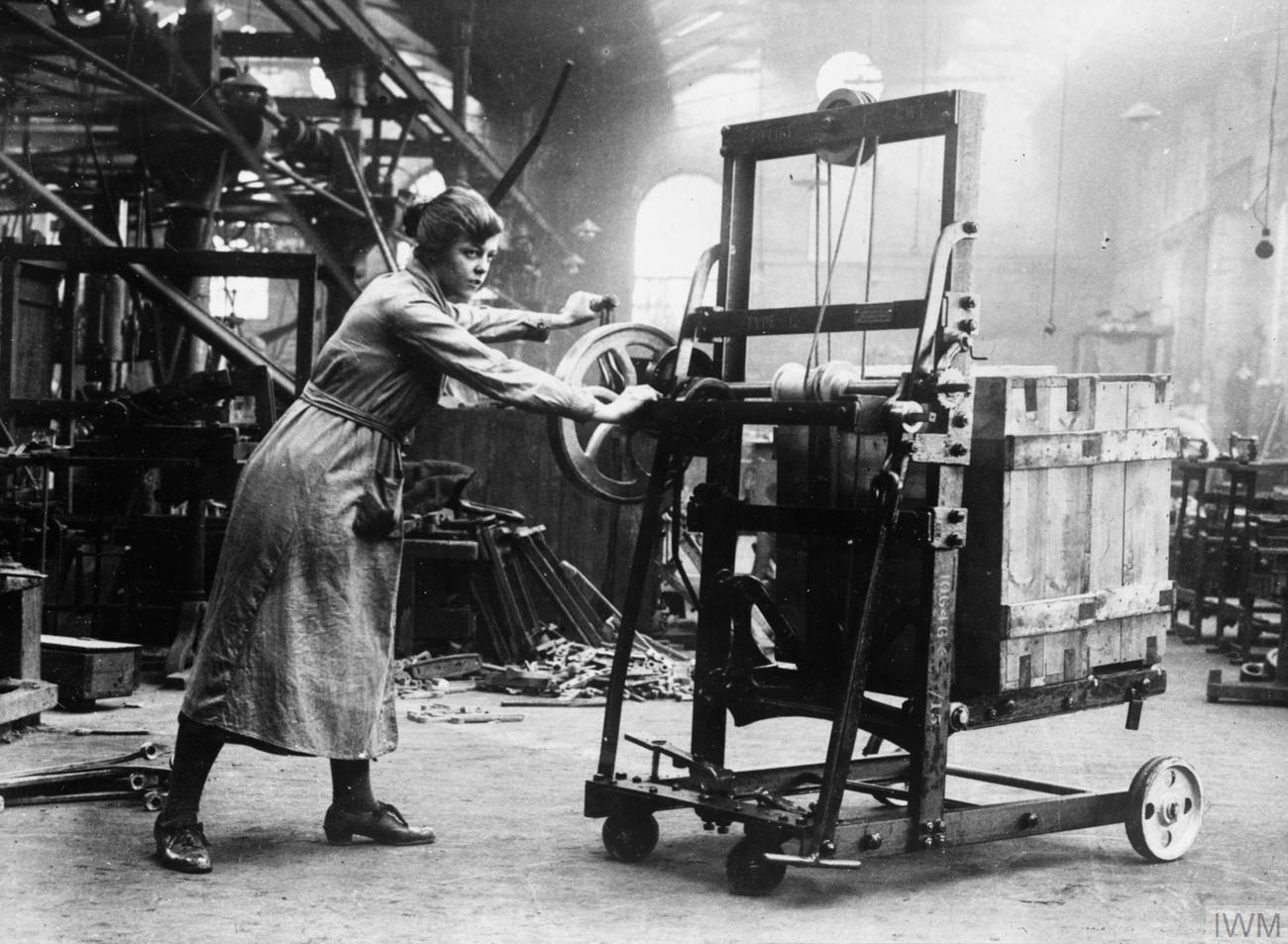
A female worker demonstrates a machine which can lift boxes to save physical labour at the Bowling Iron Works, Bradford, in November 1918

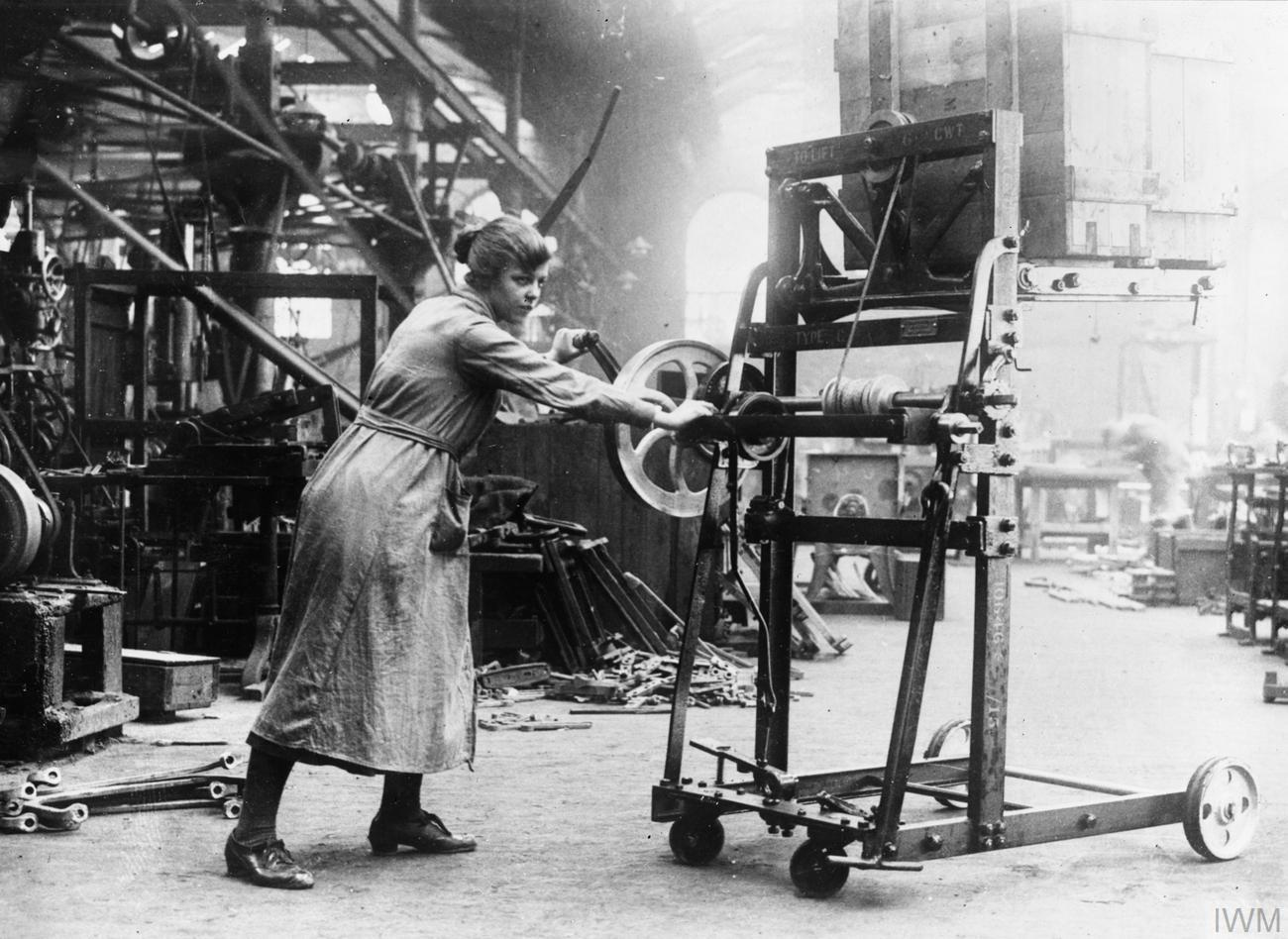
A female worker demonstrates a machine which can lift boxes to save physical labour at the Bowling Iron Works, Bradford, in November 1918
