= Hugh Sutton =

British Army officer

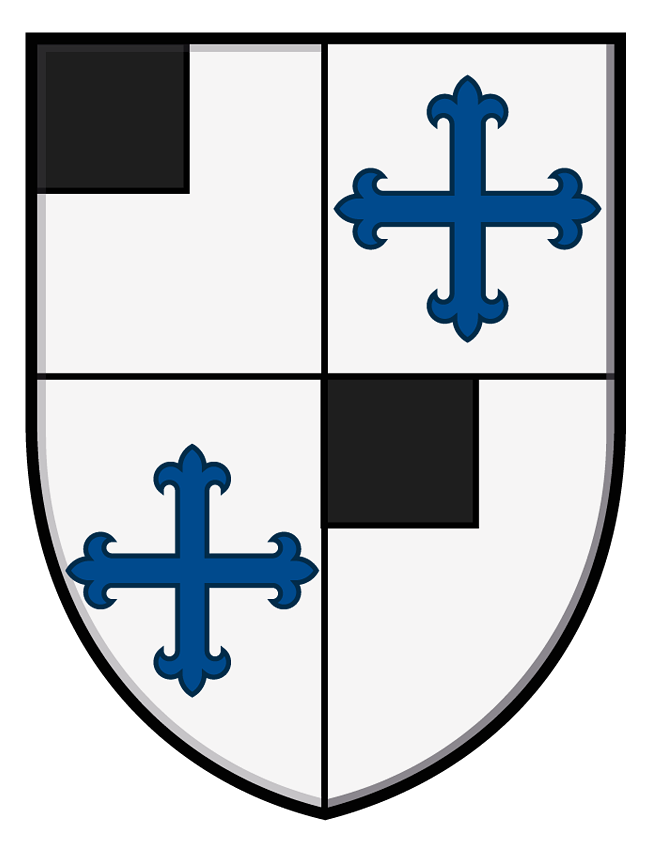
Arms of Hugh Clement Sutton, C.B., C.M.G., his family and his descendants.

Major-General Hugh Clement Sutton CB CMG (20 January 1867 – 15 April 1928) was a British Army officer, Deputy Assistant Director of Railways in South Africa between 1900 and 1902 and Lieutenant-Governor and Secretary of Royal Chelsea Hospital between 1923 and 1928.

== Early life ==
Sutton was the son of Henry George Sutton, sixth son of Sir Richard Sutton, 2nd Baronet, by his marriage to Matilda Harriet Heneage, a daughter of George Heneage Walker-Heneage MP and Henrietta Vivian. He was educated at Eton and the Royal Military College, Sandhurst.

== Military career ==
Sutton was commissioned a second lieutenant in the Coldstream Guards on 14 September 1887, promoted to lieutenant on 4 September 1890, and to captain on 1 December 1897.

He served in South Africa during the Second Boer War between 1899 and 1902. As adjutant of the Coldstream Guards, he served in the Orange Free State from February to May 1900, taking parts in the actions at Belmont, Enslin, and Modder River (November 1899), Magersfontein (December 1899), Paardeberg (February 1900), Poplar Grove and Driefontein (March 1900). He was Deputy Assistant Director of Railways in Johannesburg from July 1900 to 1902. For his service he was mentioned in despatches, received the Queen's and King's South Africa medals with seven clasps, and a brevet promotion to major dated 29 November 1900.

The war ended in May 1902, and from November that year he was assistant military secretary and aide-de-camp to Sir Henry Settle, commander-in-chief in the Cape Colony. He stayed in South Africa to serve as a Deputy Assistant Adjutant General in the Cape Colony between 1903 and 1906. He was raised to the rank of major in April 1903.

On 1 August 1910 he was promoted to lieutenant colonel and took over the post of commanding officer (CO) of the 1st Battalion, Coldstream Guards, from Colonel The Hon. William Lambton. In October 1913 he was posted to the War Office where he became an assistant adjutant general.

During the First World War: Hugh, promoted to colonel in December 1913, was serving as an assistant adjutant general at the War Office between 1913 and 1916 and as a deputy adjutant & quartermaster general (DA and QMG) in British Expeditionary Force (BEF) between 1916 and 1917. On 15 December 1916 he was made an assistant to the major general in charge of administration (MGA). He was granted the temporary rank of brigadier general whilst so employed and was graded as a brigadier general in terms of pay. On 8 November 1917 he was appointed as a deputy inspector general of communications.

== Awards and recognitions ==
He was invested as a Companion, Order of the Bath (C.B.) in 1916 and as a Companion, Order of St Michael and St George (C.M.G.) in 1919.

== Family ==
He married Mabel Ida Munro, daughter of Sir Campbell Munro of Lindertis, 3rd Baronet, and Lady Henrietta Maria Munro (née Drummond), on 25 July 1891. Hugh and Mabel had one son:

- Nigel Eustace Philip Sutton (29 March 1896 – 18 March 1956)

He married Alexandra Mary Elizabeth Wood, daughter of Charles Wood, 2nd Viscount Halifax of Monk Bretton, on 15 September 1898, they had three daughters:

- Margaret Agnes Sutton (born 26 September 1899, d. 1993), m. 1937, John Julian Chetwynd (1906–1966), son of Godfrey Chetwynd, 8th Viscount Chetwynd.
- Mary Frances Sutton (12 June 1904 – 2 April 1975).
- Elizabeth Mary Sutton (born 17 April 1910), m. (1) 1931 (div. 1936), Sir (Ronald) Mark Cunliffe-Turner; m. (2) 1936 (div. 1976), John Tindall-Lister (1907–1994), son of Sir William Tindall Lister.
