= St Wilfrid's Church, Hickleton =

Church in South Yorkshire, England

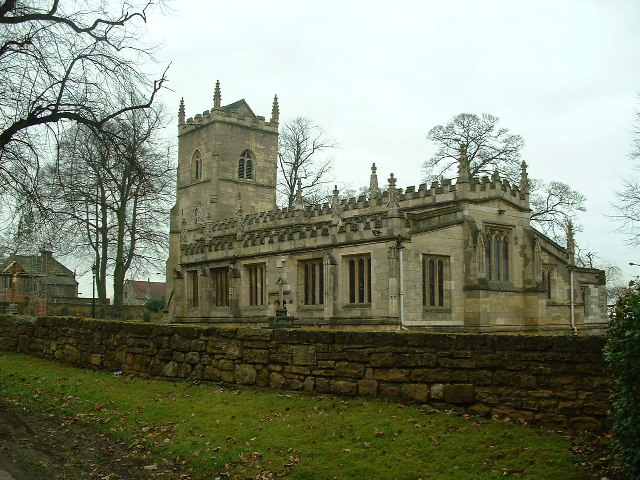
- St Wilfrid's Church, Hickleton
- 53.5422°N 1.2726°W
- OS grid reference: SE 48300 05301
- Denomination: Church of England
- Churchmanship: Anglo-Catholic
- Website: www.parishofgoldthorpeandhickleton.co.uk

History
- Dedication: St. Wilfrid

Architecture
- Architect: G F Bodley

Administration
- Province: York
- Diocese: Sheffield
- Parish: Goldthorpe with Hickleton

Clergy
- Priest: Fr Carl Schaefer

St Wilfrid's Church, Hickleton, is a parish church of the Church of England in Hickleton, near Doncaster in South Yorkshire.

== Location and history ==
The existing church of St Wilfrid lies to the south of the A635 Doncaster–Barnsley road as you enter the village of Hickleton from the east. Archaeological excavations date the existing building back to c. 1150 but there is the suggestion of a church on this location in Saxon times. The building is Grade I listed.

The chancel arch is a fine example of Norman construction, indicating that the church originally consisted of simply a small nave and chancel, whilst the western end of the nave and the porch date back to about 1300.

The tower is perpendicular in style, being built of typical South Yorkshire Magnesian limestone and sandstone, which was possibly added when the church and its lands were gifted to the Priory of Monk Bretton by the Archbishop Neville of York in 1386 following the destruction of the priory by fire.

== Restorations ==
The first major restoration took place between 1876–1888 and was supervised by G. F. Bodley. During this period a new north aisle and sacristry were added, the roof was raised and renewed, the sanctuary was paved with marble and new screens were added to enclose the altar.

The second set of extensive work took place in the 1980s, when the building was seriously affected by a geological fault which caused it to list dangerously. A concrete base was installed under the foundations which allows for the structure to be corrected using hydraulic jacks should there be any further movement.

== Lychgate and skulls ==
The lychgate to the north-west of the church has three human skulls set behind a grille above which are the words (in Latin and English) "Today for me, Tomorrow for thee". A local legend has arisen which suggests they are the skulls of three sheep rustlers, hanged at nearby High Melton or three fallen women of the Parish but it is more likely that they were obtained by Lord Halifax (2nd Viscount) to serve as a memento mori. The two outer ones are genuine, both having had the crowns removed surgically and the centre one is a stone which replaces the original stolen in the 1980s.

== See also ==
- Grade I listed buildings in South Yorkshire
- Listed buildings in Hickleton
