= Robert Kearsley =

Member of Parliament for Ripon
- In office 12 July 1865 – 17 November 1868 Serving with John Hay (1866–1868); Charles Wood (1865–1866)
- Preceded by: Reginald Vyner; John Greenwood
- Succeeded by: John Hay

Personal details
- Born: 1822
- Died: 22 October 1892 (aged 70)
- Party: Liberal

Robert Kearsley (1822 – 22 October 1892) was a British Liberal Party politician.

Vyner was elected MP for Ripon at the 1865 general election and held the seat until 1868 when the seat was reduced to one member and he stood down.

Parliament of the United Kingdom
Preceded by Reginald Vyner; John Greenwood	Member of Parliament for Ripon; 1865–1868; With: John Hay (1866–1868); Charles Wood (1865–1866)	Succeeded by John Hay
