= Fulmer Place =

Country house in Fulmer, England

Coordinates: 51.5623°N 0.5579°W

Fulmer Place is a Grade II listed mansion at Fulmer in Buckinghamshire which was formerly the home of Lord John Hay.

== History ==
Formerly the seat of the Darell family, the original manor house was demolished long ago. A modern villa was built on the site in the italianate style in 1742 and acquired by William Frogatt, a solicitor, in 1796. After Frogatt's death in 1809 the property passed through several hands and was purchased in about 1876 by Admiral of the Fleet Lord John Hay, who served as First Naval Lord in 1886. The house is still standing and is now Grade II listed.

== Sources ==
- Lysons, Samuel (1806). Magna Britannia: Bedfordshire, Berkshire, and Buckinghamshire.
