= Hickleton Hall =

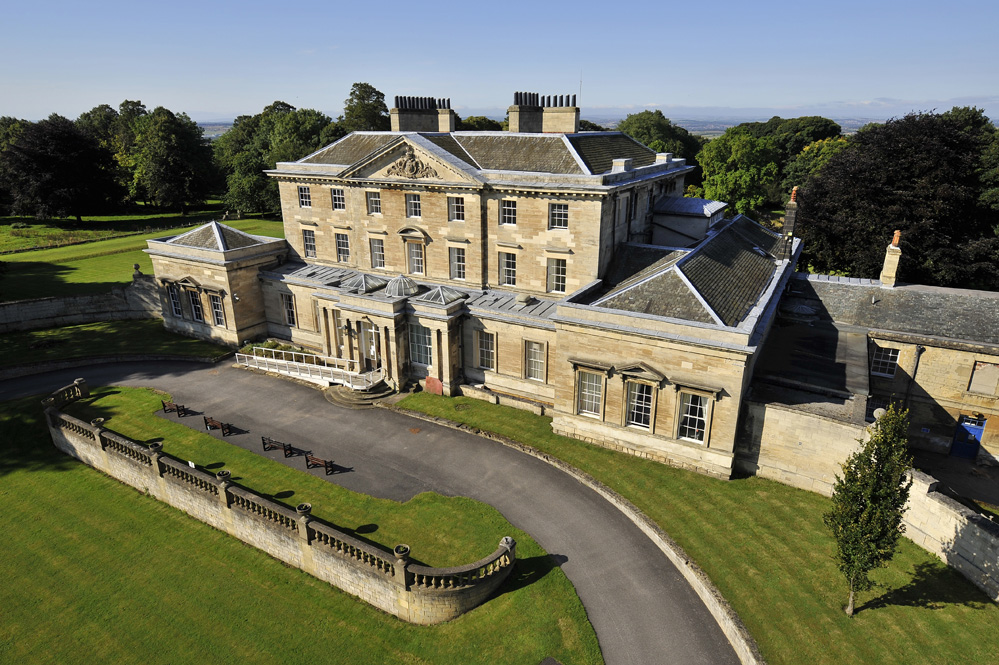
- Hickleton Hall seen from the northeast

- Location within South Yorkshire

General information
- Status: For Sale by Fine & Country: OnTheMarket; Zoopla; Rightmove
- Type: stately home
- Architectural style: Georgian
- Location: Doncaster, South Yorkshire, England
- Coordinates: 53°32′26″N 1°16′25.4″W
- Owner: Sue Ryder Care Home

Design and construction
- Architect: James Paine

Other information
- Parking: Yes

Website
- www.hickletonhall.co.uk

Hickleton Hall is a Grade II* listed Georgian stately home in Hickleton, South Yorkshire, England, about 6 miles (10 km) west of Doncaster. For more than 50 years (until 2012) it was a Sue Ryder Care home. It was being converted to luxury apartments, and is now up for sale again.

It was built in 1745–48 of limestone ashlar with graduated slate roofs. The main range has a seven-bay frontage with flanking pavilions.

== History ==
In the 16th century a house called Hickleton Palace stood on the site, built for Judge Francis Rodes. The present Hall was built in 1745–1748, just to the south of the original house, designed by the architect James Paine for Godfrey Wentworth of Woolley, near Barnsley, who had bought the estate in about 1730. He had the house extended in about 1775 with the addition of two low wings on either side and a servants wing. He died in 1789 and the Hall was inherited by his grandson, Godfrey Wentworth Armytage, who changed his name to Godfrey Wentworth Wentworth. He was appointed High Sheriff of Yorkshire for 1796–1797. When his banking business failed he was forced to sell the property.

It was bought in 1828 by Sir Francis Wood, 2nd Baronet of Hemsworth and Garrowby, and on his death in 1846 passed to his son Charles Wood, 3rd Baronet (1800–1885). Charles Wood was MP for Grimsby, Wareham, Halifax and Ripon. He was Chancellor of the Exchequer 1846–1852 and created Viscount Halifax in 1866. He died in 1885 at the Hall, which was then inherited by his son Charles Lindley Wood (1839–1934), the 2nd Viscount and on his death by his son, Edward Wood, the 3rd Viscount Halifax, who was Viceroy of India from 1926 to 1929, Foreign Secretary from 1938 to 1940 and created Earl of Halifax in 1944.

In the Second World War the house was the headquarters of I Corps after the Dunkirk evacuation in May 1940.

The Halifax family preferred their estate at Garrowby to Hickleton and in 1947 sold the contents of Hickleton Hall and leased the premises as a girls' school, St Hilda's Church of England school run by members of the Order of the Holy Paraclete Convent). From 1961 to 2012 the hall and the immediate parkland were run by Sue Ryder Care as a Sue Ryder Home. The house was offered for sale in 2015.

== See also ==
- Grade II* listed buildings in South Yorkshire
- Listed buildings in Hickleton

== Sources and further reading ==
- Newbold, David John. "British planning and preparations to resist invasion on land, September 1939 – September 1940". King's College, University of London.
- Pevsner, Nikolaus; Radcliffe, Enid (revision) (1967) [1959]. Yorkshire the West Riding. The Buildings of England. Harmondsworth: Penguin Books. pp. 263–264. ISBN 0-14-071017-5.
