= Fulmer =

Village in Buckinghamshire, England

Coordinates: 51.561°N 0.558°W

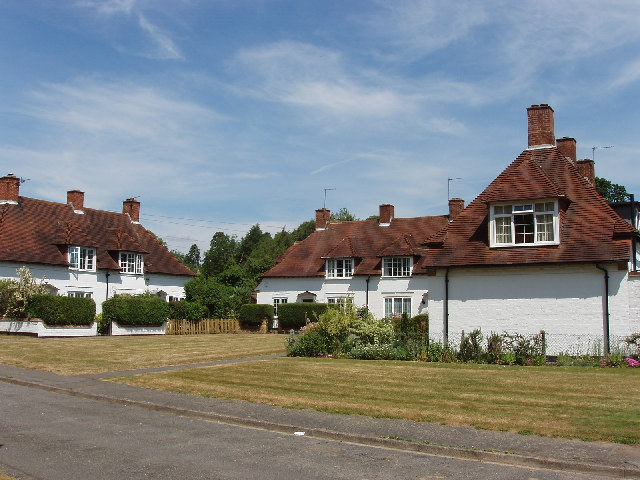
- Allhusen Gardens, Fulmer

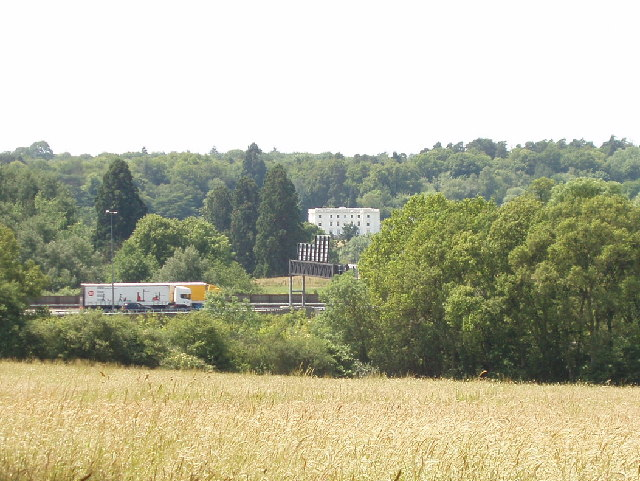
- Fulmer Hall with surrounding woods forming most of the north of the parish, taken from the M40. In the grounds are the purpose-built pharmaceutical research laboratories.

- Location within Buckinghamshire
- Area: 5.58 km^{2} (2.15 sq mi)
- Population: 547 (2021 census)
  - Density: 98/km^{2} (250/sq mi)
- OS grid reference: SU9985
- Civil parish: Fulmer
- Unitary authority: Buckinghamshire
- Ceremonial county: Buckinghamshire
- Region: South East
- Country: England
- Sovereign state: United Kingdom
- Post town: Slough
- Postcode district: SL3
- Dialling code: 01753
- Police: Thames Valley
- Fire: Buckinghamshire
- Ambulance: South Central
- UK Parliament: Beaconsfield

Fulmer is a village and civil parish in south Buckinghamshire, England. The village has, along most of its northern border, a narrow green buffer from Gerrards Cross and its heavily wooded adjoining neighbouring villages of Iver Heath and Wexham. The village's name is derived from the Old English for "mere or lake frequented by birds". It was recorded in 1198 as Fugelmere.

In the late 17th century the owners of the manor of Fulmer were forced to sell their house to their servants because they had squandered their money and could not afford to pay them. The manor then passed into the hands of the Duke of Portland.

In the mid-19th century watercress was grown at Moor Farm, known locally as "The Bog", (now Low Farm) by Richard Whiting Bradbery, the son of William Bradbery, the first British watercress pioneer who had a large cress farm at West Hyde, Hertfordshire. Richard is buried in St James' churchyard, Fulmer, with his wife Hannah.

Fulmer Chase on Stoke Common Road is a former home of the Wills tobacco family and was used as a military hospital during World War II.

Fulmer is close to Pinewood Studios and several films have been shot in the village, including Those Magnificent Men in their Flying Machines and Sleepy Hollow. The headquarters of The Mahdi Servants Union is located there.

== Demography ==
Fulmer is a small civil parish in South Buckinghamshire, England, with a population of 547 residents and 218 households, according to Censusdata UK. Located near Gerrards Cross, it is a rural, wooded village with a population structure composed of 43.8% males and 56.2% females.

2011 Published Statistics: Population, home ownership and extracts from Physical Environment, surveyed in 2005
Output area	Homes owned outright	Owned with a loan	Socially rented	Privately rented	Other	sq mi roads	sq mi water	sq mi domestic gardens	sq mi domestic buildings	sq mi non-domestic buildings	Usual residents	sq mi
Civil parish	78	80	11	35	11	0.136	0.029	0.131	0.011	0.013	485	2.15

== Education ==
Fulmer Infant School is in Fulmer.

Beehive and Honeycomb Nursery in Fulmer.

International School of Creative Arts is currently in the area, but will be moving in September 2026.

Teikyo School United Kingdom is in the area.

== Notable people ==
- Marmaduke Darrell
- Angelina Jolie (lived here)
- Vernon Kay
- Yasser Al-Habib
- David Newbery (was born here)
- J. Peter Robinson (was born here)
- John Sulston, Nobel Laureate (was born here)
- Michael York (actor) (was born here)

== Sport and recreation ==
Cricket has been played in the village from at least the first half of the 19th century. The sporting magazine, Bell's Life in London, carried an article on 6 August 1843 which suggested that the Vicar, Revd Butterfield, had 'formed a club between the youths of that village, and presented them with a stock of bats, balls and stumps'. Hitherto, the article continued, the youths had been wont to 'congregate in clusters to pursue the disreputable game of pitch and toss', especially on the Sabbath.

How long the Vicar's club endured isn't clear, but the late nineteenth century saw a re-foundation of the game. A local village team existed in 1886 but the current club was officially founded in 1895.

Fulmer Cricket Club play their games at King George's Field, named as a memorial to King George V. Local resident and noted cricketer Denis Compton opened the new clubhouse in 1988.

Former Paralympic equestrian gold medalist Sophie Christiansen trained at the South Bucks RDA near Fulmer, and has a gold post box dedicated to her and to her horse, Janeiro 6, which is situated outside The Black Horse pub.
