= Hickleton =

Village and civil parish in South Yorkshire, England

Coordinates: 53.542°N 1.276°W

- Village
- Location within City of Doncaster Location within South Yorkshire
- Population: 274 (2011)
- Metropolitan borough: Doncaster
- Metropolitan county: South Yorkshire
- Region: Yorkshire and the Humber
- Country: England
- Sovereign state: United Kingdom
- Post town: Doncaster
- Postcode district: DN5
- Dialling code: 01709
- Police: South Yorkshire
- Fire: South Yorkshire
- Ambulance: Yorkshire
- UK Parliament: Doncaster North

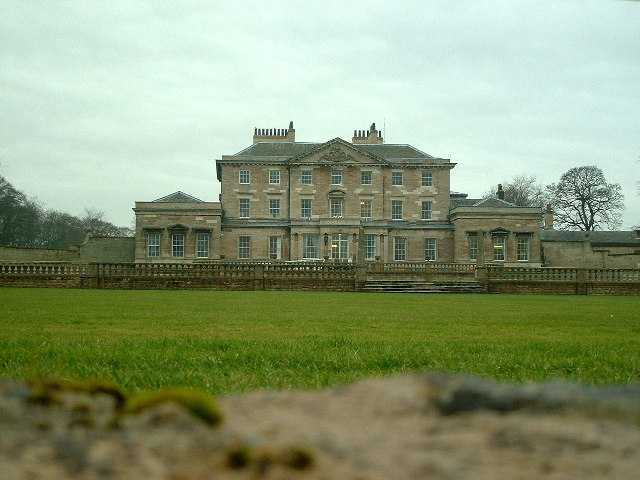
Hickleton Hall

Hickleton is a village and civil parish in the City of Doncaster in South Yorkshire, England. Historically part of the West Riding of Yorkshire, it had a population of 291, which had reduced slightly to 274 at the 2011 census. Hickleton is 6 miles (10 km) west of Doncaster and 8 miles (13 km) east of Barnsley.

There are records of Hickleton's history dating back to Saxon times although some consider the settlement to have Roman roots.

The name Hickleton probably derives from the Old English hicoltūn meaning 'woodpecker settlement', though the first element may be derived from the personal name Hicel.

More recently, it was the "estate village" of Hickleton Hall, formerly the home of the earls of Halifax and then a Sue Ryder Care Home until 2013.

The parish church, St. Wilfrid's, is mainly of mediaeval construction with Norman features that was restored in Victorian times by George Frederick Bodley.

Two locations in Hickleton appear in the top ten worst locations in England for air quality; the village has the most polluted air in Yorkshire. There have been numerous campaigns to construct a bypass around the village and Marr to the east.

== See also ==
- Listed buildings in Hickleton
