= Cape Delgado =

Promontory in Mozambique

Coordinates: 10.86°S 40.64°E

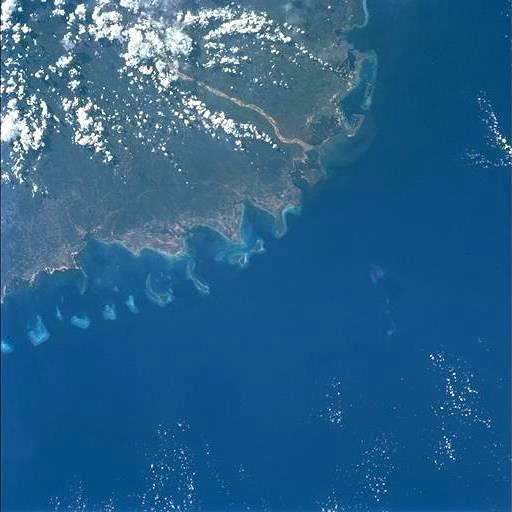
Cape Delgado from space

Cape Delgado (Portuguese: Cabo Delgado) is a coastal promontory south of Mozambique's border with Tanzania. It is the arc-shaped delta of the Rovuma River and was created from sediment deposited by the Rovuma as it empties into the Indian Ocean. It is sometimes identified with Prasum, the southernmost point of Africa known to the Roman geographers Marinus of Tyre and Ptolemy. In Ptolemy's Geography, it marked the point where Africa turned eastward along a great unknown shore to meet southeast Asia and enclose the Indian Ocean. Medieval Islamic cartographers dispensed with the idea at least as early as the 9th-century al-Khwārizmī but the conception returned to Europe following Jacobus Angelus's c. 1406 Latin translation of Maximus Planudes's restored Ptolemaic text and was not (openly) dispensed with until after Bartholomew Dias's successful circumnavigation of Africa in 1488.

Cape Delgado gives its name to Cabo Delgado Province of Mozambique.

== See also ==
- Shar, M. D. (2025-04-23). "13. Cape Delgado: Mozambique's coastal treasure". Beyond the Headlands: Tales of Cape. Mahesh Dutt Sharma.
