= Trevitt =

Trevitt is a surname. Notable people with the surname include:

- Gavin Trevitt
- Simon Trevitt (born 1967), English footballer
- William Trevitt (1809–1881), American doctor, politician, diplomat, and newspaper publisher
- William Trevitt (dancer), British dancer and choreographer
- Harry Smith Trevitt (1878–1979), organist and composer
- Ryan Trevitt (born 2003), English footballer
