= St Lawrence's Church, Ecchinswell =

Church in Ecchinswell, Hampshire, England

Coordinates: 51°20′09″N 1°16′55″W

East end window, by Burlison and Grylls showing a Crucixion with St Augustine and on the left St Lawrence, with his griddle or gridiron.

East end window, by Burlison and Grylls, south chapel. Showing amongst others the Madonna and Child, another of the Blessed Virgin Mary, the prophet Isaiah, and St. John the Baptist.

Lady Chapel, east end window, detail, Annunciation, by Burlison and Grylls.

West end window, St Nicholas and St Christopher, in thankfulness for the life and example of William Howley Kingsmill of Sydmonton (1838-1894), given by his widow and children.

Stained glass window of Saint Katherine, on the south wall, in memory of a dearly loved sister, 2 December 1884.

St Lawrence's Church (St Laurence) is a Grade II listed church in Ecchinswell, Hampshire, England, in the rural deanery of Whitchurch, within the Diocese of Winchester, designed by Bodley & Garner, 1885–87, at a time when Ninian Comper was their articled pupil, 1883-1887. It has 200 sittings.

The Grade II listed lychgate, also designed by Bodley & Garner, was added in honour of William Howley Kingsmill (1838-1894) in 1895.

St Lawrence's is the parish church for the villages of Ecchinswell, Bishop's Green, and Sydmonton.

The long and thin parishes of Sydmonton and Ecchinswell stretch from the River Enborne and the county boundary in the north to the Port Way, the Roman road that ran from Silchester to Old Sarum, in the south.

== History ==
The foundation stone of the new St Lawrence's church, was laid on 10 August 1885 by Sydmonton's Mrs. Kingsmill (Constance Mary Portal, wife of William Howley Kingsmill), 'dedicated like the ancient fabric to Saint Lawrence', on a more convenient site. In 1852 William White described the old St Laurence : 'The church is a small ancient fabric, without tower, situated in low swampy ground'. The new was consecrated by Harold Browne, the Lord Bishop of Winchester, on Friday 15 October 1886. Rev Canon (George Raymond) Portal (1827-1889), rural dean and uncle of Mrs W. H. Kingsmill, read the Epistle, and the Gospel was read by the Ven. Archdeacon who also gave the sermon. Archdeacon Sumner, George Sumner, Ven. Archdeacon of Winchester, was husband of the founder of the Mothers' Union and son of a previous Bishop of Winchester, Charles Sumner, KG (1790 – 1874). Sumner's sermon was on Revelation 21, verse 22 : And I saw no temple therein: for the Lord God Almighty and the Lamb are the temple of it. The church cost £5,000.

== Exterior ==
Knapped flint with Bathstone dressings. The south-west porch-tower has a weatherboard belfry with a steep pyramidal shingled spire, at the west end there is an ashlar-faced projection around the tower providing the bell-chamber stairs.

== Interior ==
The nave and chancel are in one, with undecorated chancel stalls and aisles. There is a two-seater sedilia in stone. The east window is placed high to allow for a reredos, now missing. Above the altar and some of the chancel there is a ceilure, in red and green. Instead of a chancel arch there is a magnificent open screen combined with the rood beam. The spired font cover is by Bodley & Garner, dated 1893. There were two ogee topped openings between the nave to the aisles, the northern one has been blocked up. High up on the chancel's eastern wall are parts of a fabric wall covering by Bodley & Garner, executed by Watts & Co.

Organ by Messrs. Bevington & Sons, London, 1887, which cost £230. Organ case by Bodley & Garner. The case is inscribed: Alleluia Gloria Tibi Jesu Rex aetna Gloriae. In May 1887 'special services of a bright and hearty character' were given for the new organ. At the 3 pm Benediction service the sermon was given by the Dean of Winchester, Dr Kitchen, and Rev William Henry Castell Malton, curate of St Frideswide's Church, read the lesson.

There are stained glass windows by Burlison and Grylls, a company founded in 1868 at the instigation of Bodley & Garner. The stained glass east-end window is dated 1886 while the west window shows Saint Nicholas and Saint Christopher, for William Howley Kingsmill (1838-1894), of Sydmonton Court, is dated 1933, given by his widow and children. A brass plaque says that the east windows were placed by (major-general) Edward Coysgarne Sim (1838-1900) (Royal Engineers) and Alice Frances Howley Sim his wife to the Glory of God and in pious memory of (her parents) William Kingsmill, who died 11 February 1865, and of Anne Jane his wife (daughter of Archbishop Howley), who died 20 June 1871, also in memory of (their son) Arthur Coysgarne Sim, Midshipman, RN who died 24 February 1894, aged 18.

In the south-easterly window is a Ploughman by Francis Skeat 1984 for Dick Woodridge, of Park Farm, Sydmonton. On the south aisle there is a stained glass window of St Anne, in memory of Anne Hill, organist of this parish for 52 years, died 9 November 1930.

There are monumental stone inscriptions to local landowner Lt. Colonel Andrew de Portal Kingsmill (1881-1956), DSO, OBE, MC, DL, JP, of North Sydmonton house, (son of William Howley Kingsmill of the west window and lynch gate here), and of his wife (Olga) Gertrude (1886-1966).

In the old vestry behind the organ there is a marble scroll monument to: 'John Digweed, Esquire, of this place. He fell asleep February 1843 aged 76 years'. This John Digweed of Ecchinswell House, was interned inside the old church; the horizontal gravestone is still there, now in the open air, all that remains above ground to mark where the original St Laurence's was. Churchwarden Digweed's nephew Lt. Colonel William Henry Digweed (1810-1881), JP, of Ecchinswell House, donated the holy acre for the new church. This is the family that rented the manor and large farm in Steventon, thereby grew up with and were friends of Jane Austen.

On the south wall there is an inscription on stone, cantate domino canticum novum, to singer and writer Lionel Portman (1873-1940) of Swaites house.

== Timeline ==
- 1852, Chapelry of Ecchinswell & Sydmonton was separated (sequestrated) from St Mary's, Kingsclere;
- 1853, Vicarage house built, by Frederick Digweed for Rev Lewis Rugg;
- 1853, sister church of St. Mary, Sydmonton, rebuilding finished;
- 1861, school built, by J. P. Harrison for William Kingsmill (died 1865) of Sydmonton;
- 10 August 1885, foundation stone laid by Mrs. Kingsmill (Constance Mary Portal, wife of William Howley Kingsmill);
- 15 October 1886, dedicated, consecrated, by the Lord Bishop of Winchester;
- 1979 Parish of Ecchinswell with Sydmonton was joined with parish of Burghclere with Newtown to form a combined benefice.
- circa 1980, sister church of St Mary, Sydmonton closed;
- 2014, deaths of Geoffrey and Pat Eastop.

== Incumbents ==
(Incomplete list)

- Rev Wilfrid Anderson Boyce (1849-1935);
- Rev Herbert Heriot-Hill, (1867-1929);
- Rev Bernard Norton Adams, BA, of Selwyn College, (born 1881), 1929-1931;
- Rev Herbert George Wright, 1932-?;
- Rev Thomas Michael Evans (1876-1962), 1937-1955;
- Rev Canon Anthony Jardine (born 1938), 1973–1987;
- Rev Martin Wyatt Garner (1939-2008), 1987–1993;
- Rev Carl le Prevost (born 1963), 1993–1998;
- Rev David Bartholomew (born 1950), 1998–2020;
- Rev Anthony Smith (born 1957), 2020-.

== Tower ==
In 2022 the three bells dated 1912, 1886 and 1886 weighing 4-1-3, 5-1-25 and 6-2-17 by John Warner & Sons were replaced by six weighing between 1-0-22 and 3-1-4 by Mears & Stainbank (1963), Gillett & Co (1885), Gillett & Johnston (1935), and the Whitechapel Bell Foundry (1871), tuned to B, A, G, F♯, E and D.

== Gallery ==
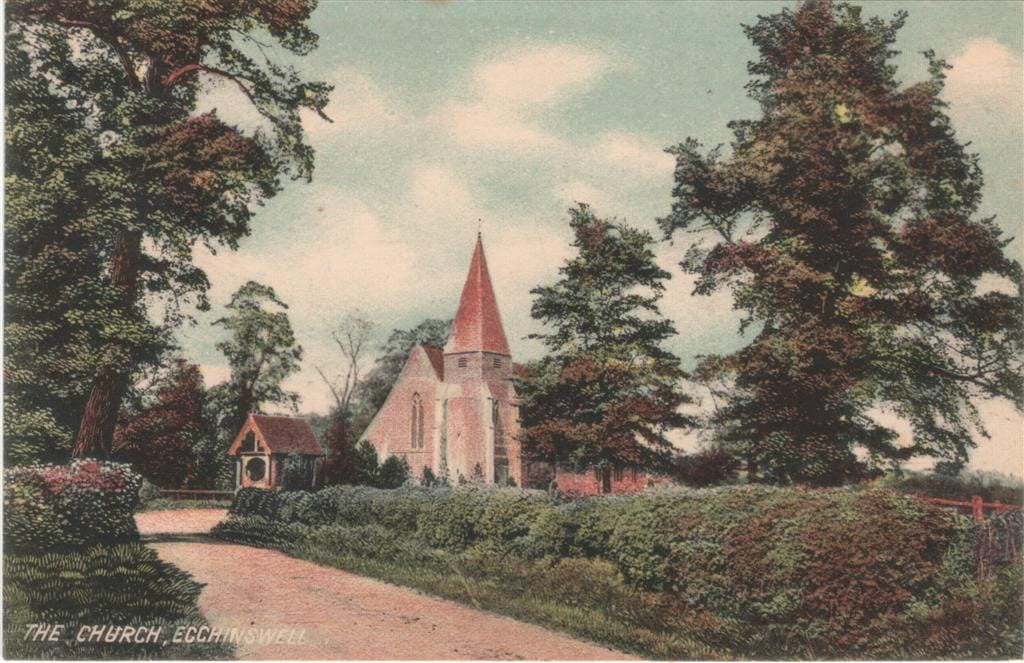
View from the south-south-west.

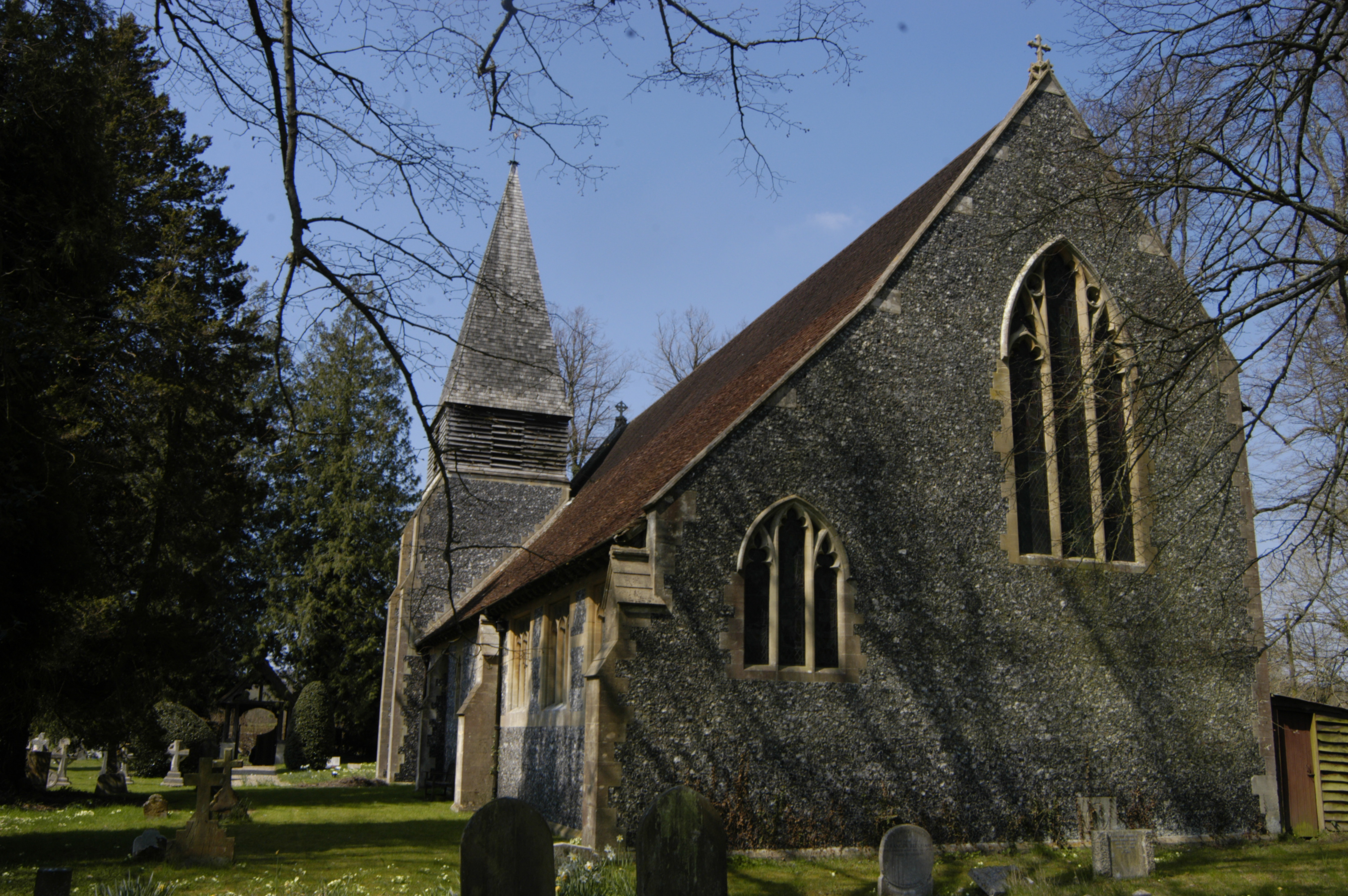
View from the east, towards the lychgate, April 2021.

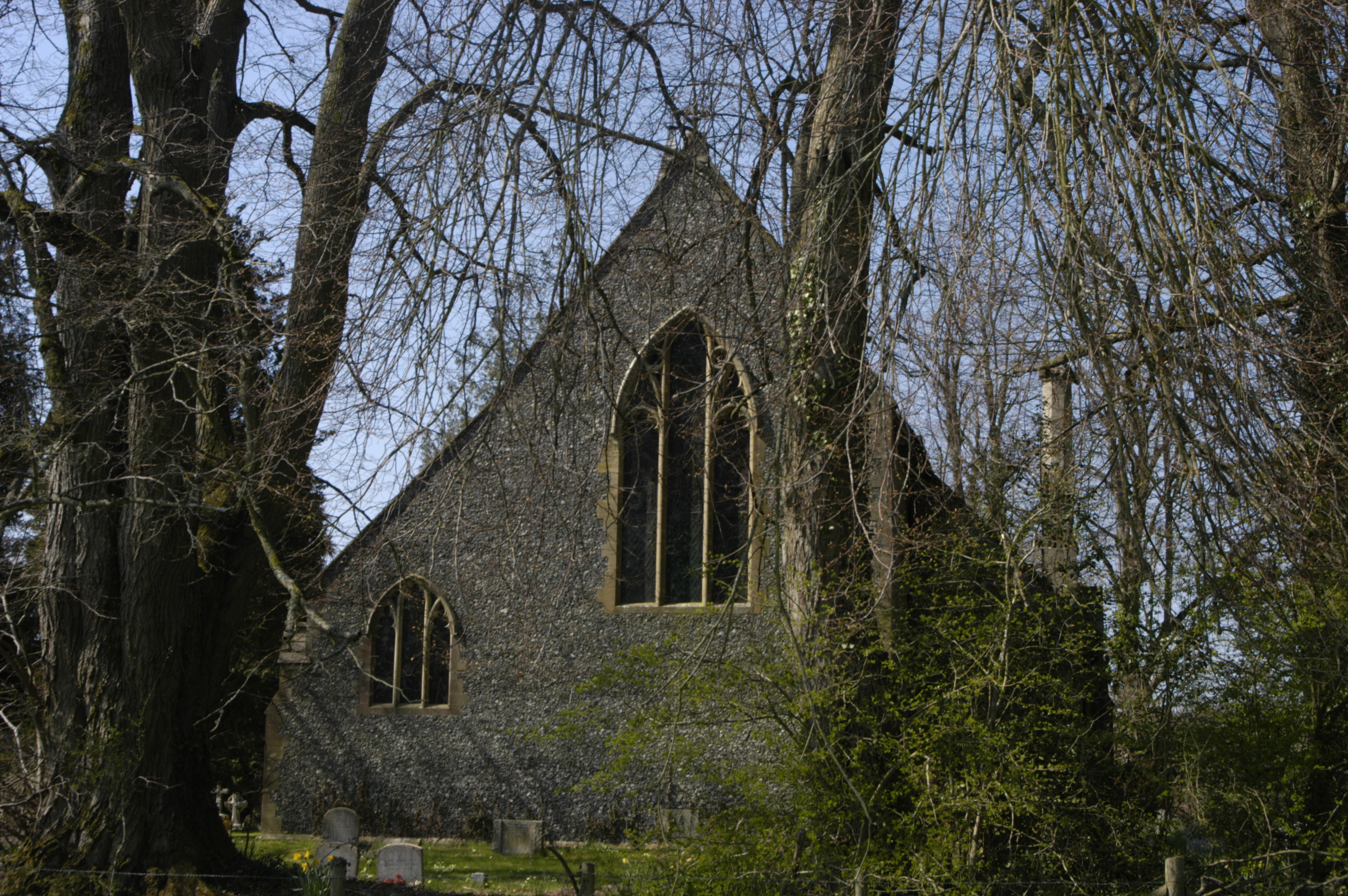
View from the east, April 2021.

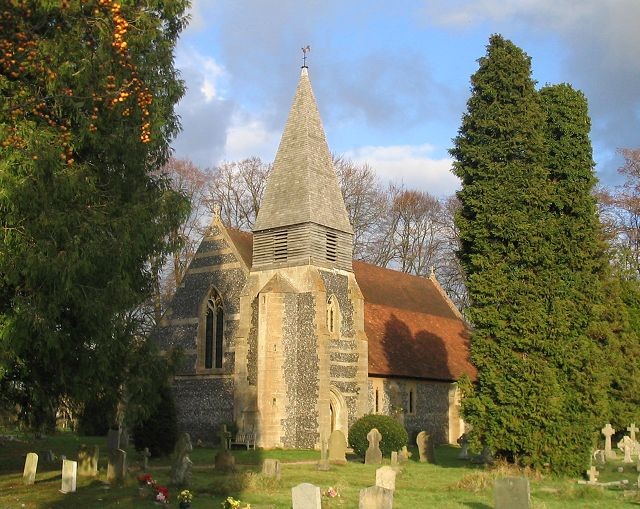
Photograph taken from the south-south-west, 2007.

Ceilure and east end wall covering.

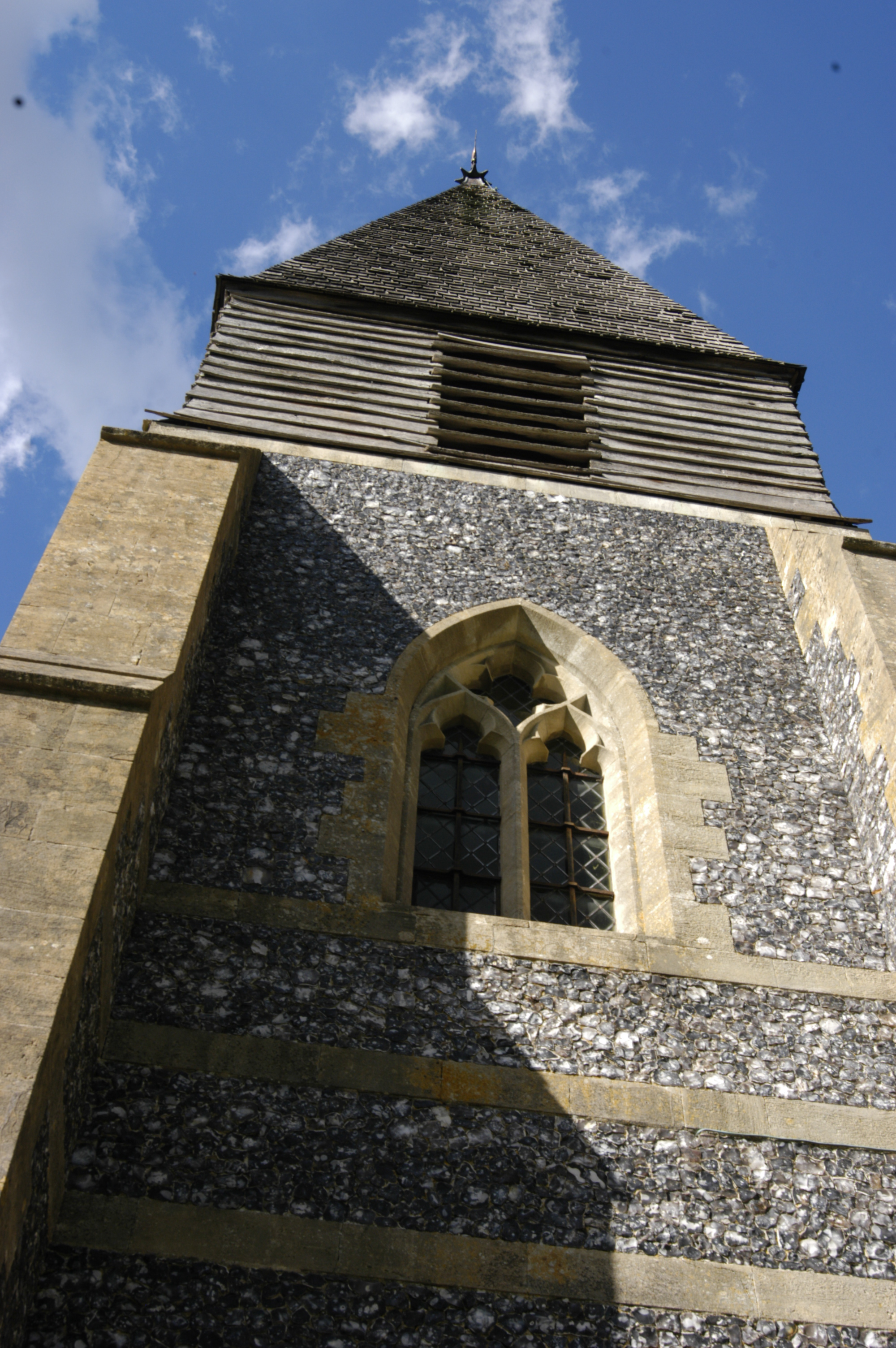
Tower and spire, September 2022.

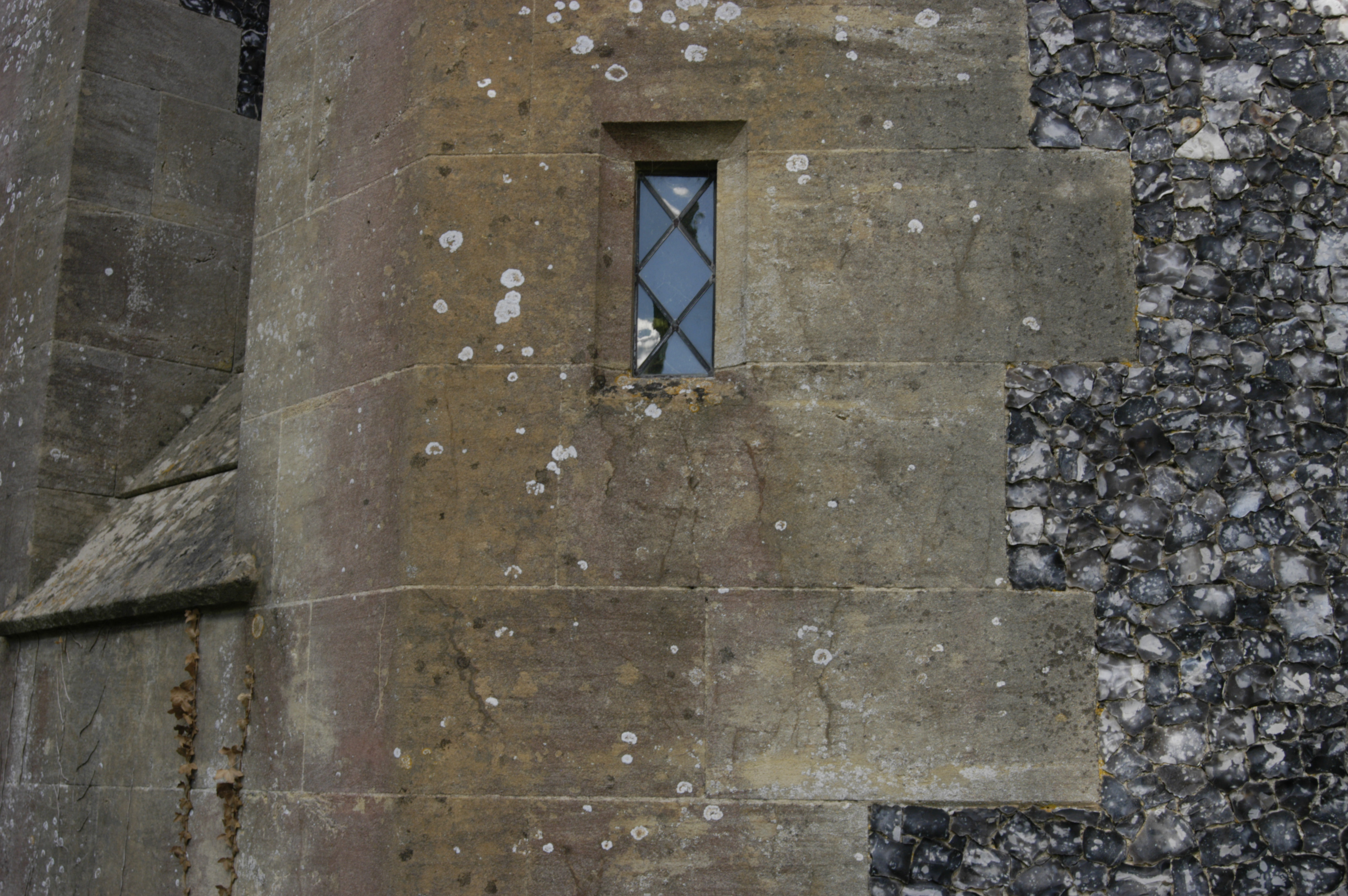
Detail of side of tower showing stair projection faceting, September 2022.

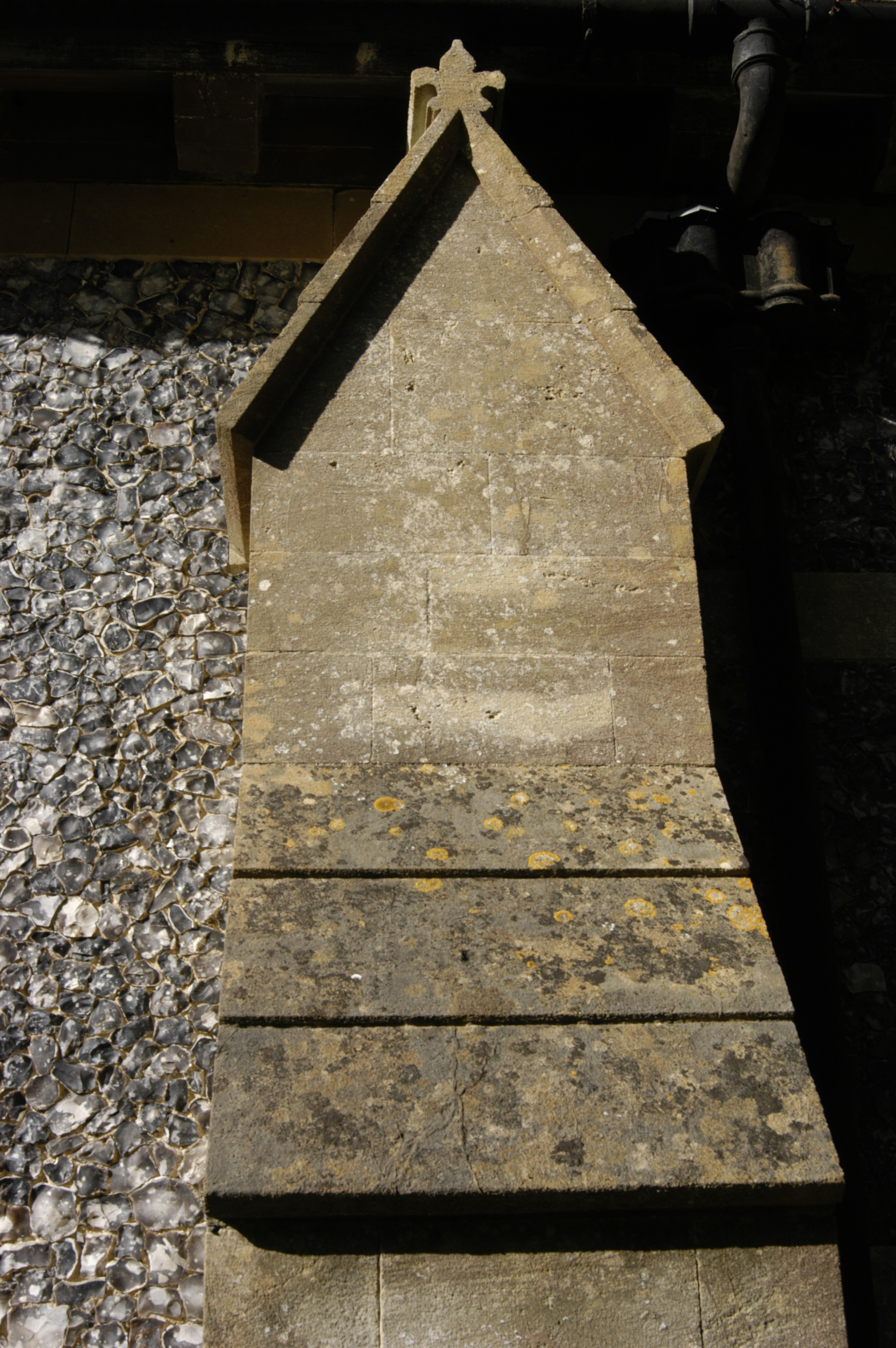
Detail of buttress, September 2022.

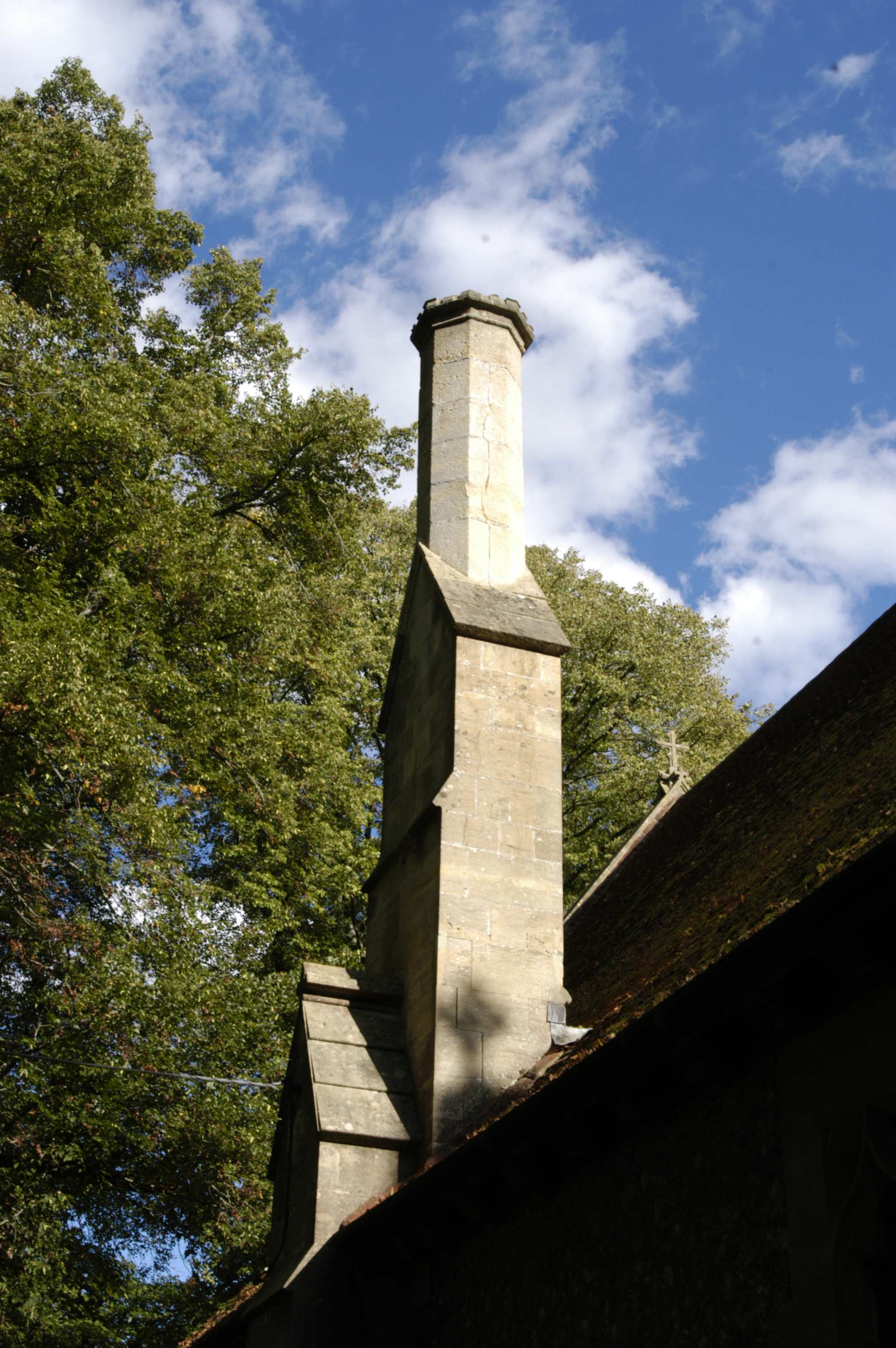
A chimney, September 2022.
