= Holy Innocents Church, South Norwood =

Holy Innocents Church
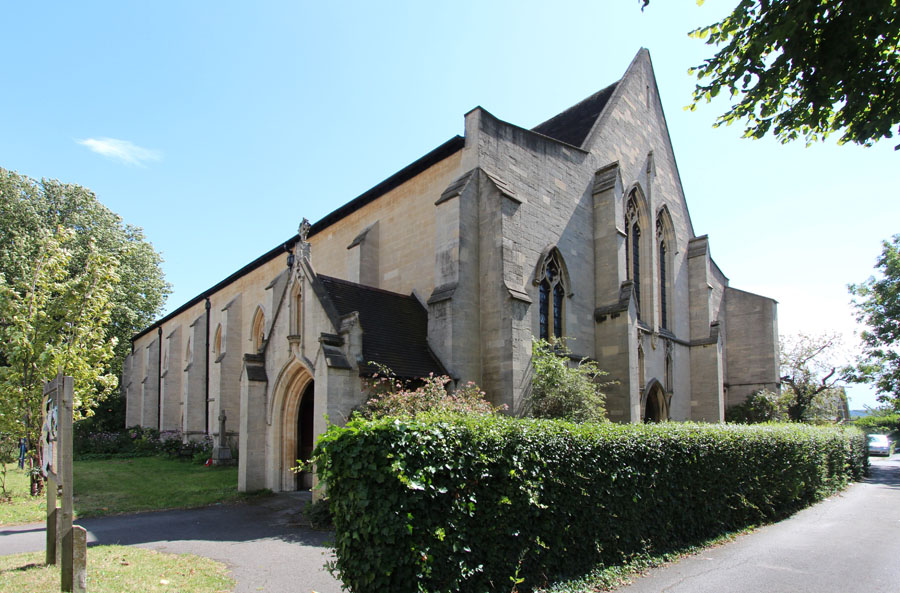
- Holy Innocents Church
- 51°23′49″N 0°04′46″W
- Country: England
- Denomination: Church of England
- Churchmanship: Anglo-Catholic

History
- Consecrated: 1895

Architecture
- Heritage designation: Grade II* listed
- Architect: George Frederick Bodley
- Style: Perpendicular Neo-Gothic
- Years built: 1894-1895

Administration
- Province: Canterbury
- Diocese: Southwark
- Archdeaconry: Croydon
- Deanery: Croydon North
- Parish: Holy Innocents, South Norwood

Holy Innocents Church, South Norwood is a Church of England parish church in the south London suburb of South Norwood, dedicated to the Holy Innocents. It was built in Neo-Gothic imitation of Perpendicular architecture between 1894 and 1895 to designs by the British architect George Frederick Bodley. Though a planned tower was never built, the church itself has been Grade II* listed since 1976.

== Gallery ==
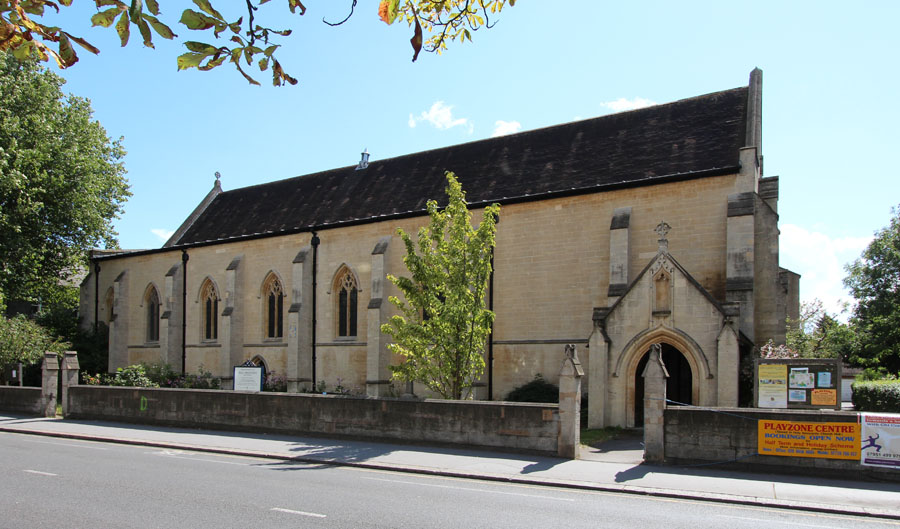
Side view of church

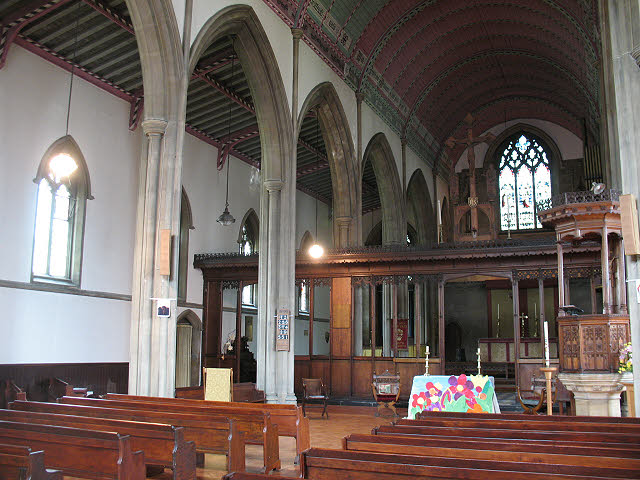
Nave

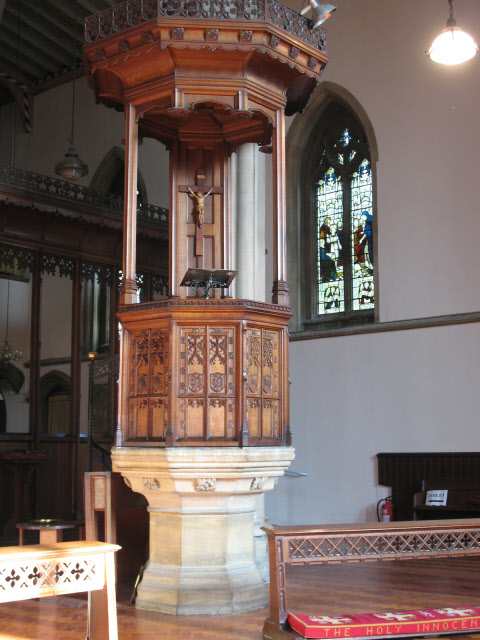
Pulpit
