= St Peter in Eastgate, Lincoln =

The Church of St. Peter in Eastgate
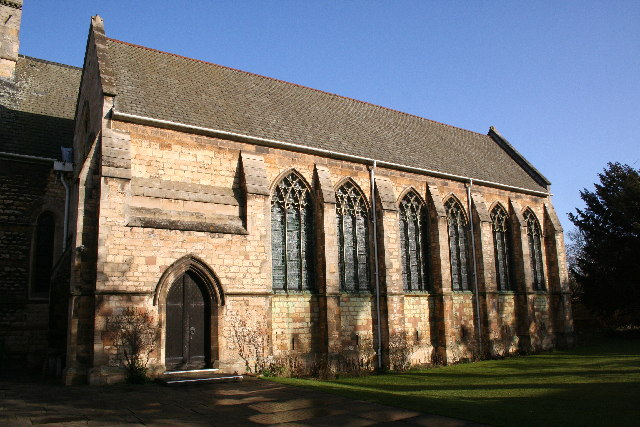
- The Church of St. Peter in Eastgate
- 53°14′08″N 0°32′01″W
- OS grid reference: SK 97978 71954
- Country: England
- Denomination: Church of England
- Churchmanship: Evangelical
- Website: stpeterineastgate.org.uk

History
- Status: In use
- Dedication: St Peter

Architecture
- Functional status: Parish church
- Heritage designation: Grade II listed
- Designated: 02-Oct-1969
- Architect: Arthur Blomfield
- Completed: 1870
- Construction cost: £2,500

Administration
- Province: Canterbury
- Diocese: Lincoln
- Archdeaconry: Lincoln
- Deanery: Christianity
- Parish: Lincoln

Clergy
- Vicar: The Rev’d Robbie Strachan

The church of St. Peter in Eastgate, Lincoln is a Grade II listed parish church in Lincoln, England.

== History ==
The original church was built in the 11th century. It was damaged in the English Civil War during the siege of 1643. Between 1776 and 1781 it was replaced. This new building lasted nearly 100 years until a large church was required, and in 1870 the present church was built by the architect Sir Arthur Blomfield. Chancel decoration was added by George Frederick Bodley in 1884.

In 1914 the south aisle was added, by Temple Lushington Moore, paid for by Alfred Shuttleworth, at the same time the Rood Screen was added.

The Louisa Smith Rooms were built where the north aisle once was in 1993, and this provided much needed meeting rooms after the Parish Hall was sold off in the 1970s. The current building has undergone further reordering in the 21st Century, due to the increasing needs of an expanding congregation. The biggest of these changes involved the removal of the choir stalls and nave pews, and the introduction of individual seats in 2009.

== Organ ==
The organ dates from 1836. Subsequent restorations and enlargements were undertaken by T.H. Nicholson, Hope-Jones, Bishop and Son and Henry Willis. In 2024 the organ was repaired and upgraded by Aistrup & Hind. Details of the organ can be found on the National Pipe Organ Register.

=== Organists ===
- Harry Smith Trevitt 1904 - 1948
- Edward Graham Patman FRCO 1961 - 1978

== Community ==
The parish is very active, describing itself as 'an evangelical Anglican church in the heart of the city of Lincoln'. It runs a toddler group, children's ministry, youth clubs, student & young adult groups and home groups. In 2006, the church planted into the newly formed Carlton Estate, meeting in the Lincolnshire Poacher. This congregation was known as 'St Peters in the Pub'. In 2016, St Peter in Carlton became a Church of England parish, and it continues to enjoy a close relationship with St Peter in Eastgate.
