= George Frederick Bodley =

English architect (1827–1907)

George Frederick Bodley RA
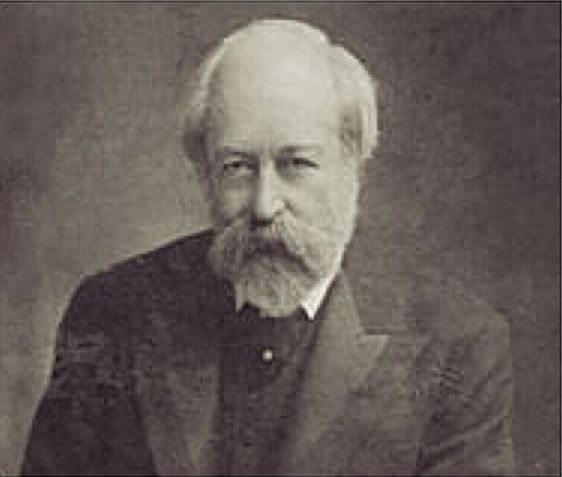
- Bodley, c. 1900
- Born: 14 March 1827; Hull, East Riding of Yorkshire, England
- Died: 21 October 1907 (aged 80); Water Eaton, Oxfordshire, England
- Occupation: Architect
- Awards: Royal Gold Medal for Architecture (1899)
- Practice: Bodley and Garner
- Buildings: Washington National Cathedral; St David's Cathedral, Hobart

George Frederick Bodley RA (14 March 1827 – 21 October 1907) was an English Gothic Revival architect. He was a pupil of Sir George Gilbert Scott and worked with C. E. Kempe. He was in partnership with Thomas Garner for much of his career and was one of the founders of Watts & Co.

== Personal life ==
Bodley was the youngest son of William Hulme Bodley, of Edinburgh, physician at Hull Royal Infirmary, Hull, who in 1838 retired to his wife's home town, Brighton. George's eldest brother, the Rev. W. H. Bodley, became a well-known Roman Catholic preacher and a professor at St Mary's College, New Oscott, Birmingham.

He married Minna F. H. Reavely, daughter of Thomas George Wood Reavely, at Kinnersley Castle in 1872. They had a son, George H. Bodley, born in 1874.

== Career ==
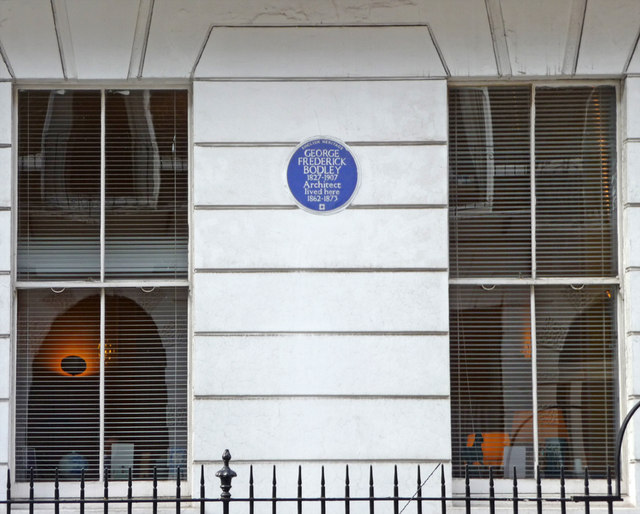
Blue plaque on Harley Street, London

Bodley was articled to the architect Sir George Gilbert Scott, a relative by marriage, under whose influence he became imbued with the spirit of the Gothic Revival, and he became known as the chief exponent of 14th-century English Gothic, and the leading ecclesiastical architect in England. He is regarded as the leader of the resurgence of interest in English and Northern European late-medieval design. Noted for his pioneering design work in the Queen Anne Revival.

Bodley became acquainted with William Morris in the late 1850s, and in the 1860s his commissions for stained glass and ecclesiastical decoration helped ensure the success of Morris's firm, Morris, Marshall, Faulkner & Co., founded in 1861. Bodley is said to have designed two of Morris's early wallpapers. By the late 1860s Bodley had become disenchanted with Morris, and for stained glass turned to the firm of Burlison and Grylls, founded in 1868, for the glass in his later churches, notably St Augustine's Church, Pendlebury, near Manchester (designed 1870) and the Church of the Holy Angels, Hoar Cross in Staffordshire (designed 1871–72).

Bodley worked with his lifelong friend, the stained glass designer Charles Eamer Kempe. They collaborated on projects including: St John the Baptist, Tuebrook in Liverpool; Queens' College Chapel, Cambridge; All Saints, Danehill, East Sussex and the Church of St Mary the Virgin, Clumber Park in Nottinghamshire. His alterations to St Stephen's Church, Gloucester Road, London, the architect and president of RIBA, Harry Stuart Goodhart-Rendel said tamed the work of its founding 'rogue' Victorian architect, Joseph Peacock.

=== Partnership with Thomas Garner ===
From 1869 he worked in a twenty-eight-year partnership with Thomas Garner, designing collegiate buildings in Oxford and Cambridge, country houses and churches throughout the British Isles. One cathedral was completed to his design: St David's Cathedral, Hobart in Tasmania, Australia (first design, 1865; revised 1891; building completed 1936). In 1906 Bodley designed with his pupil Henry Vaughan the Washington National Cathedral in Washington, D.C. He also designed Grace Cathedral, San Francisco in 1862, and again for its post-1906 earthquake replacement but it was adapted by his partner after his death.

As well as Vaughan, Bodley and Garner's pupils included the garden designer Inigo Thomas who specialised in formal gardens with geometrical plans in 17th- and 18th-century styles, which suited the houses that Bodley and Garner renovated for wealthy clients.

In 1874 Bodley founded Watts & Co. with Garner and George Gilbert Scott Jr. Bodley, Garner, and Scott all lived on Church Row in Hampstead in the 1860s and 70s.

His secular work included the London School Board offices, and in collaboration with Garner, the new buildings at Magdalen College, Oxford, and Hewell Grange, Worcestershire (for Lord Windsor).

=== Liverpool Cathedral competition ===
In 1902 Bodley was an assessor for the competition to design Liverpool Cathedral which selected a design by the young Giles Gilbert Scott. When construction of the cathedral began in 1904, Bodley was appointed to oversee Gilbert Scott's work, but had no direct part in its design.

=== Late works ===
One of Bodley's final architectural works was the chapel at Bedford School, the foundation stone of which was laid on 18 May 1907 by Lord St John of Bletso. Building took a year, the chapel was consecrated in July 1908, but by which time Bodley had died. The other was the St Chad's parish church, Burton upon Trent. Work started in 1905 and the church was consecrated in 1910. After Bodley's death his partner Cecil Greenwood Hare took over the project; his contribution was the design of an octagonal choir vestry.

=== Royal Academy ===
Bodley exhibited at the Royal Academy from 1854. He was elected an associate of the academy in 1881 and a full academician in 1902.

=== Other activities ===
As well as being an architect, he was a draughtsman, a connoisseur of art, published a volume of poems in 1899, inspired art works by painters such as John Melhuish Strudwick and designed wallpaper and chintzes for Watts & Co. He served as prime warden of the Fishmongers' Company in 1901–02. In early life he had been in close alliance with the Pre-Raphaelites, and he did a great deal to improve public taste in domestic decoration and furniture.

== Death ==
Bodley died on 21 October 1907 at Water Eaton, Oxfordshire and is buried in the churchyard of the Church of St James, Kinnersley, Herefordshire.

== Gallery ==
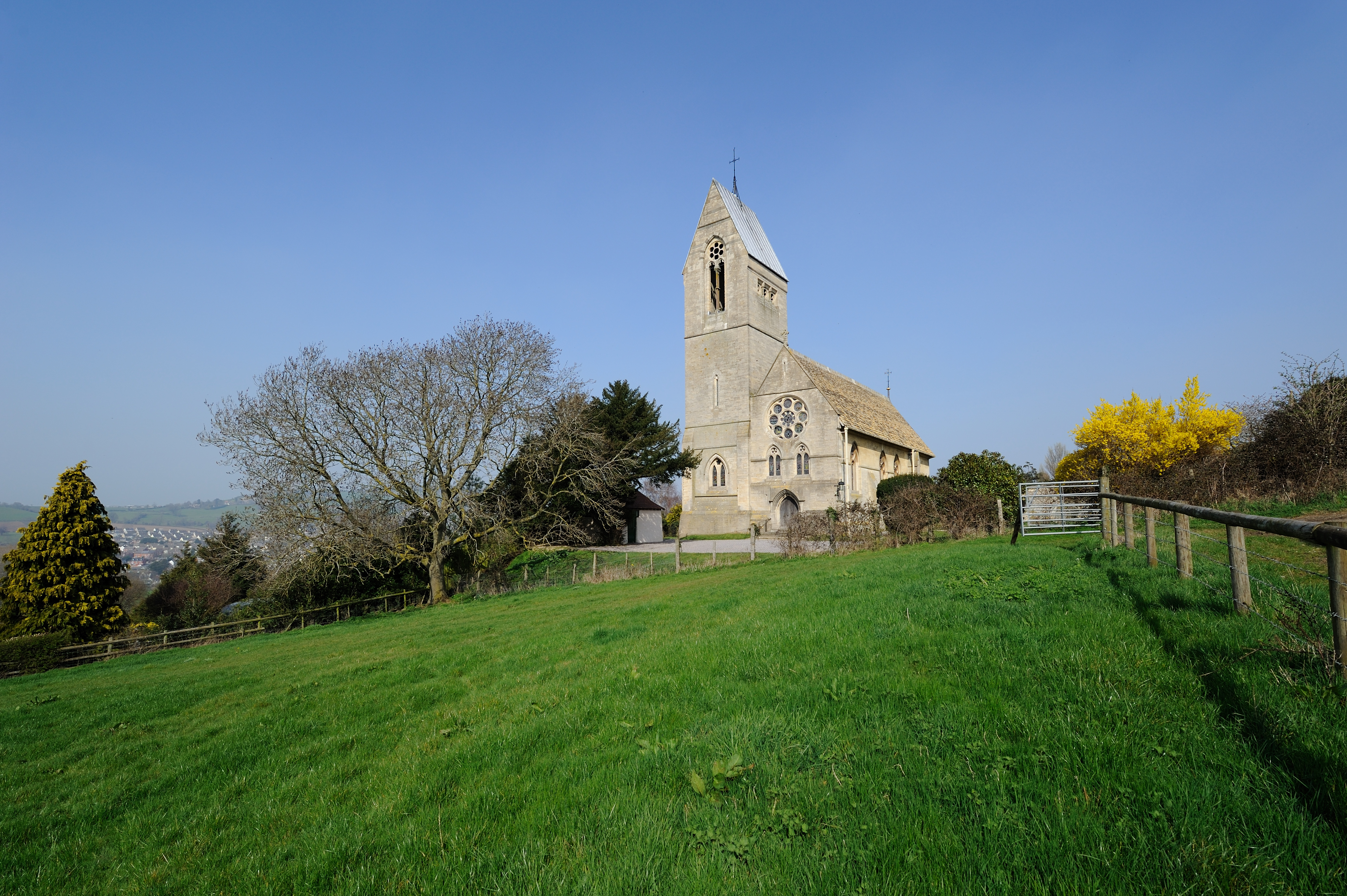
The Church of All Saints, Selsley

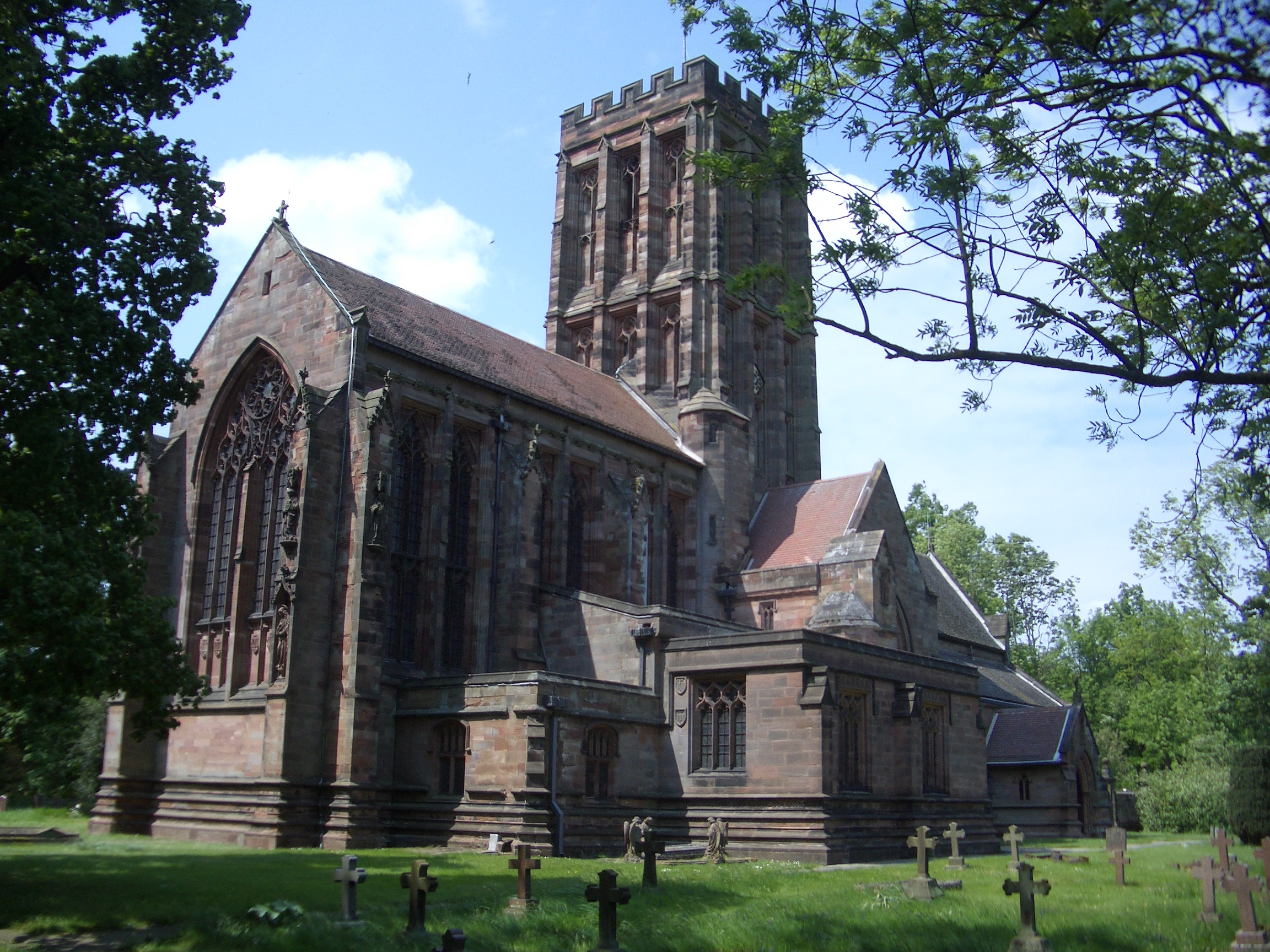
The Church of the Holy Angels, Hoar Cross

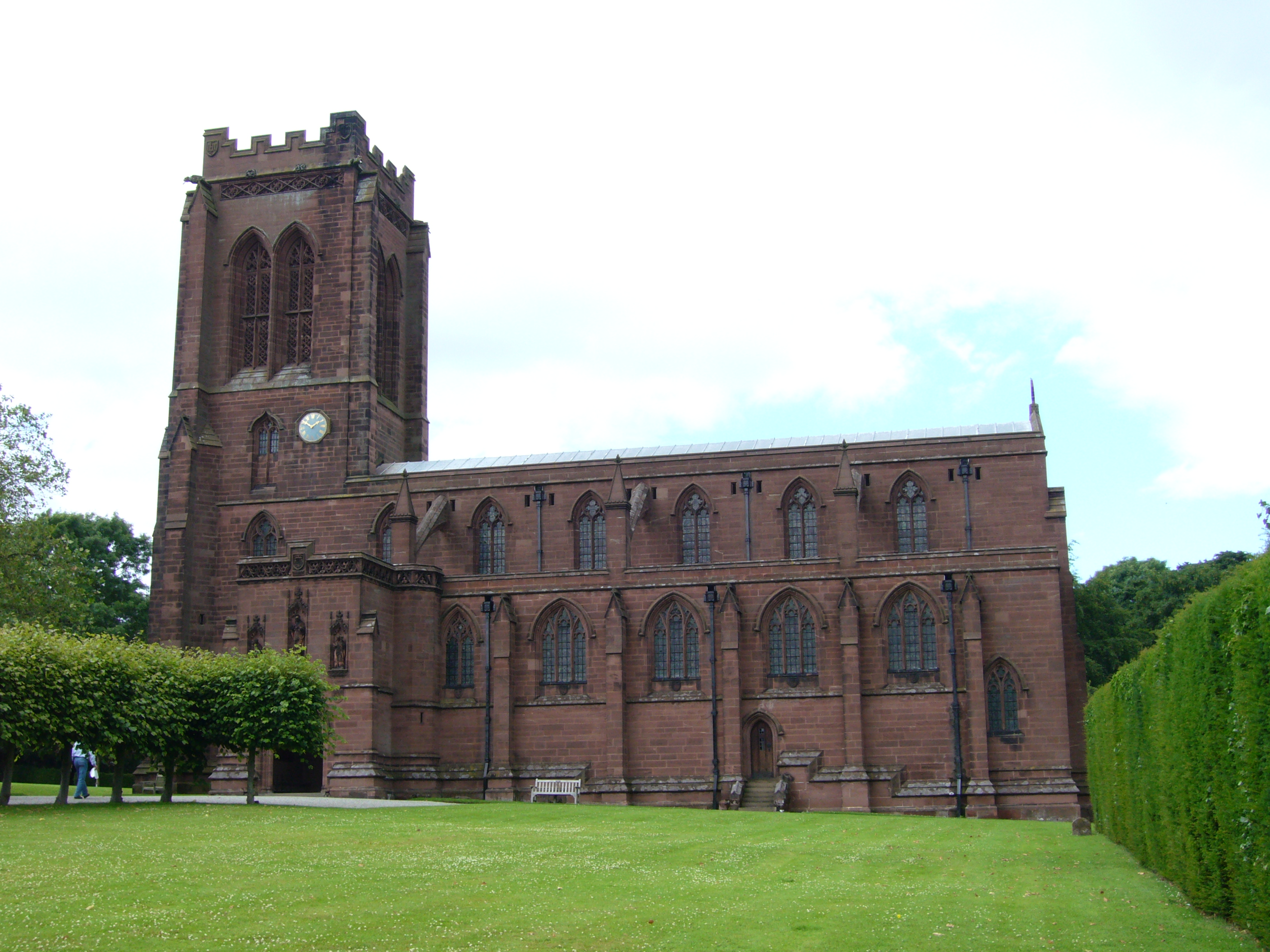
St Mary's Church, Eccleston

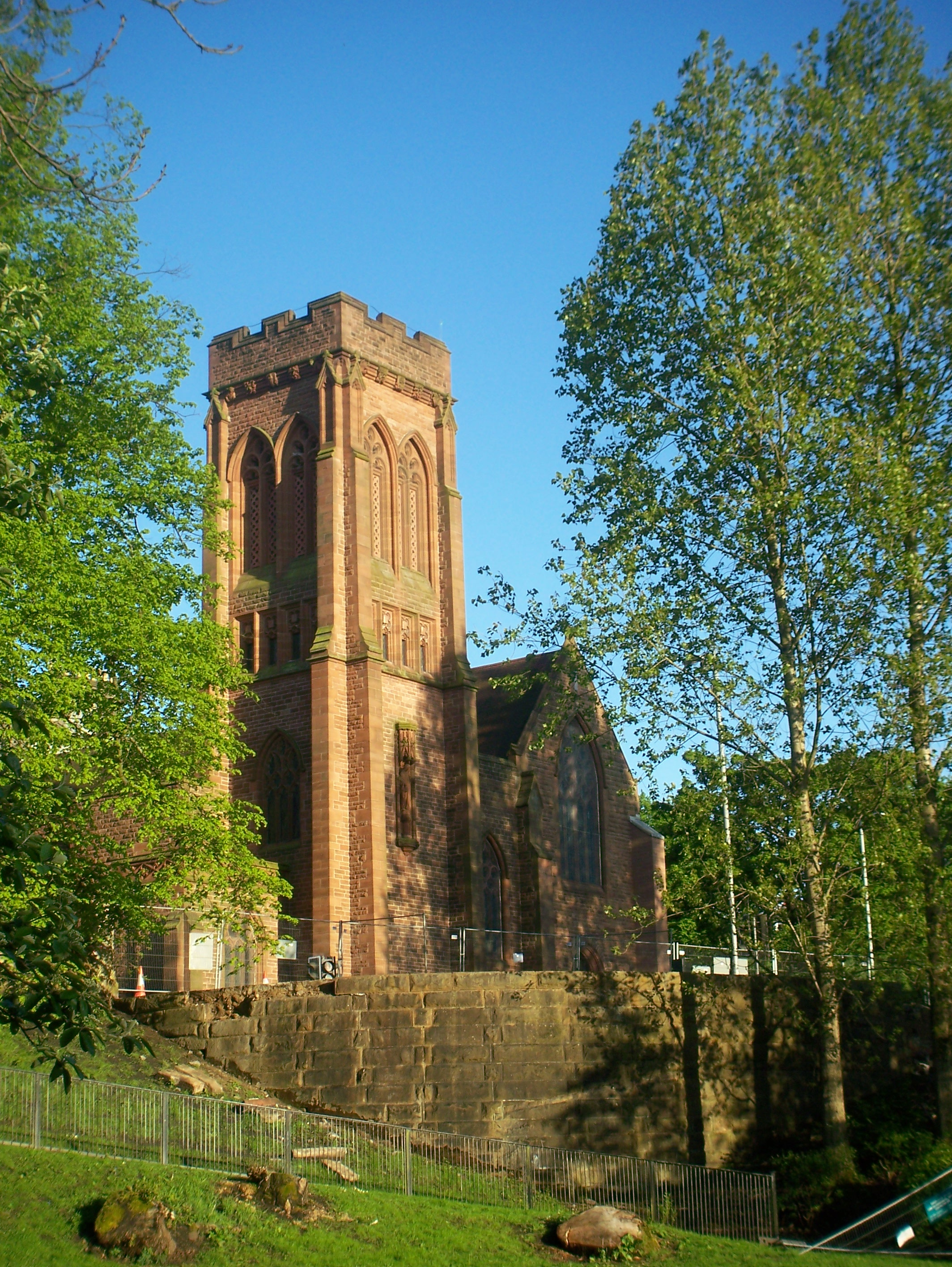
St Bride's Episcopal Church, Glasgow

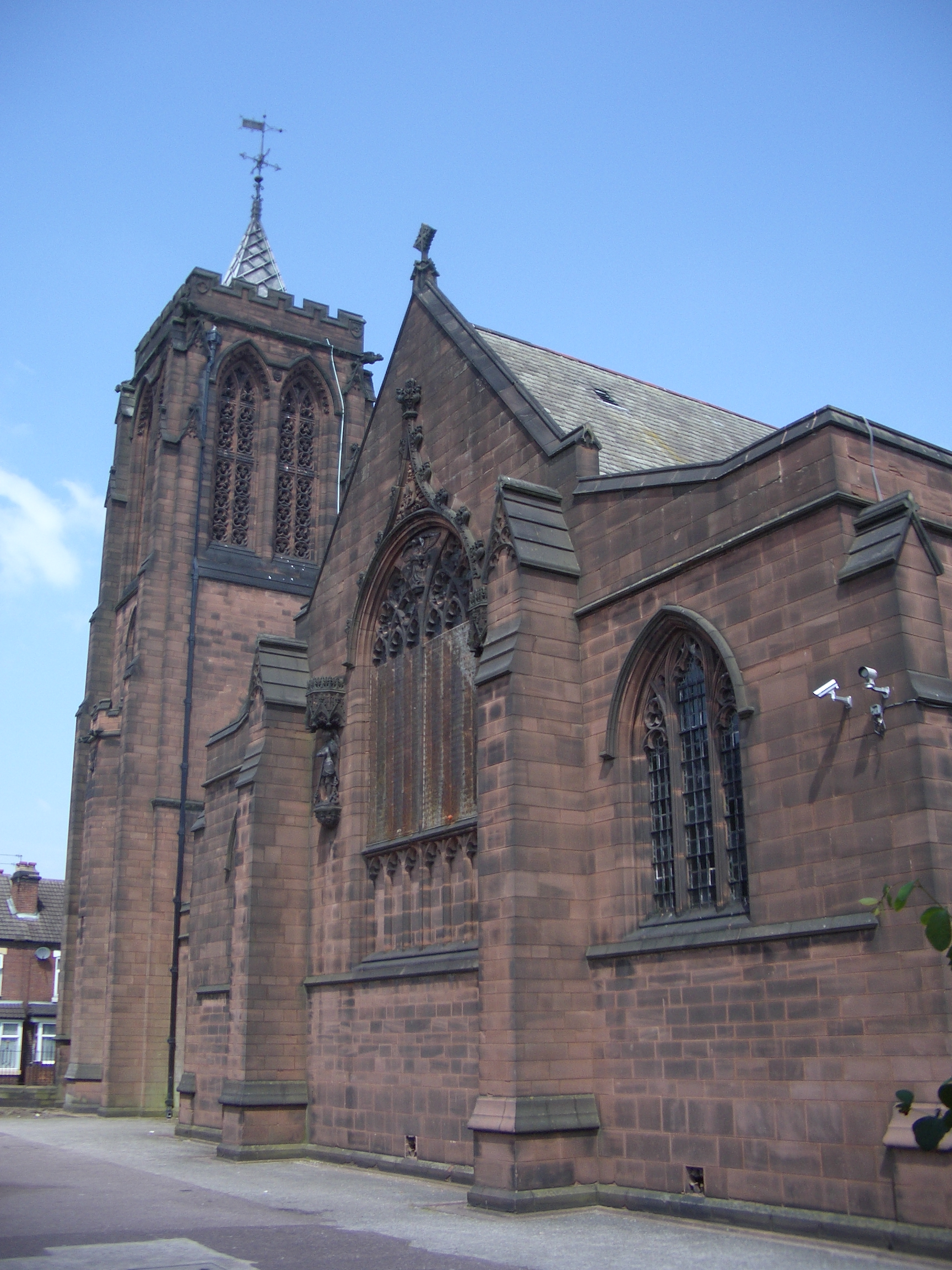
St Chad's, Burton upon Trent

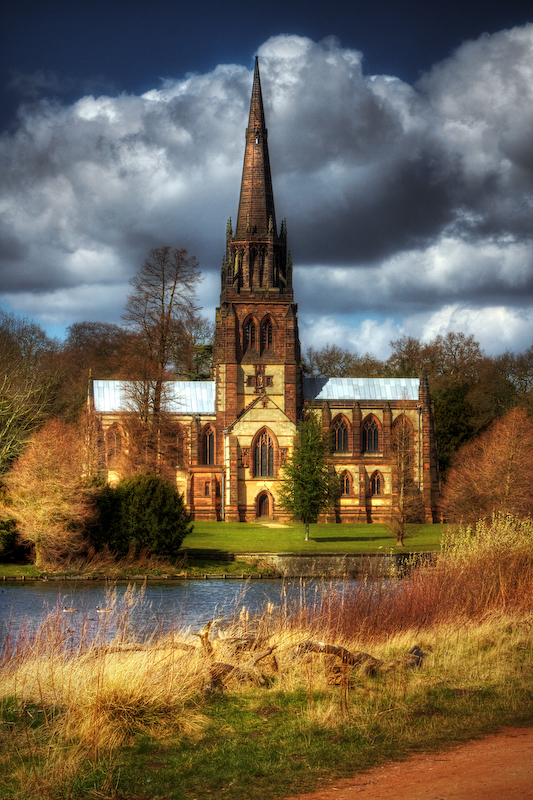
Clumber Park Chapel

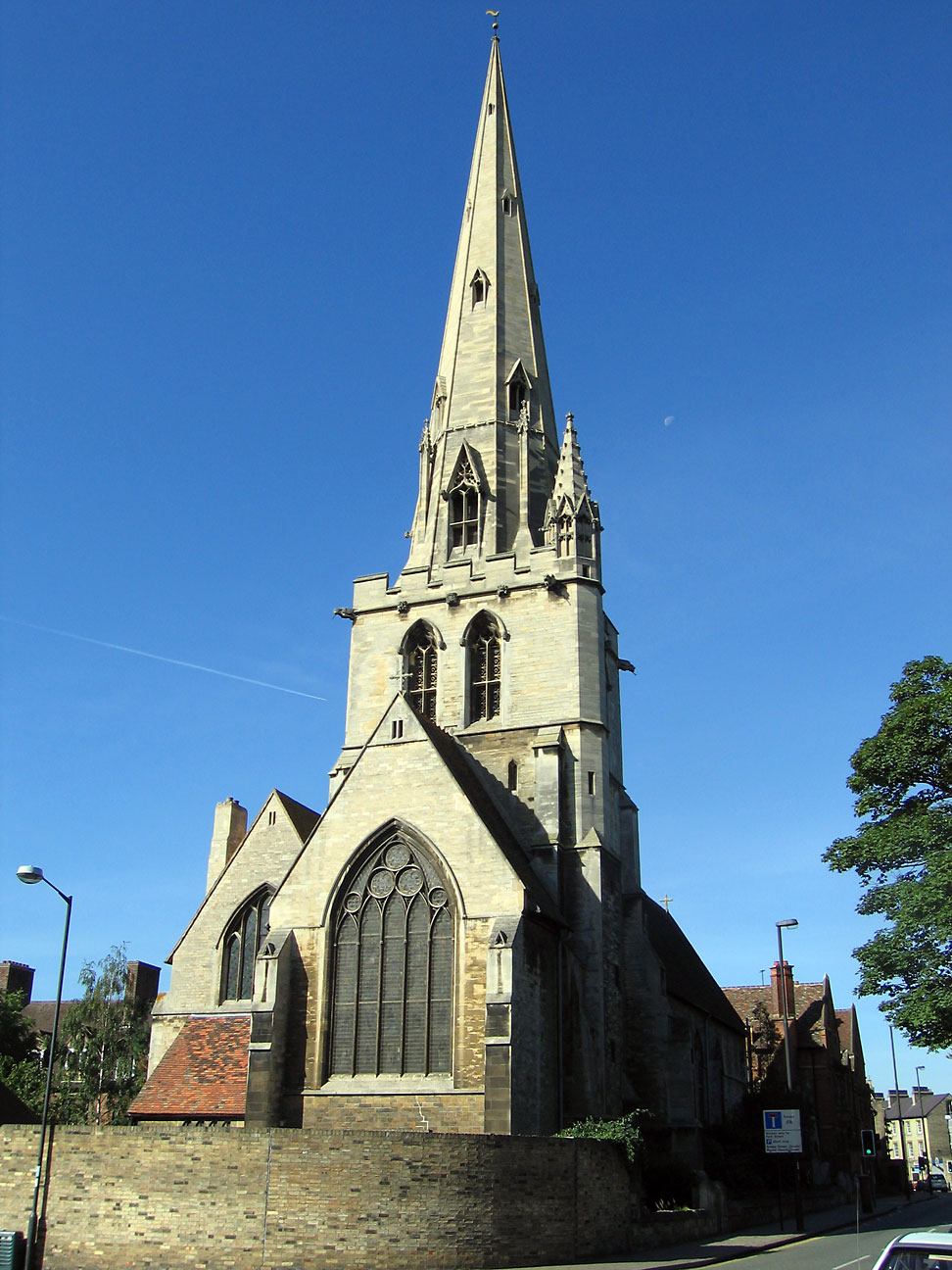
All Saints' Church, Cambridge

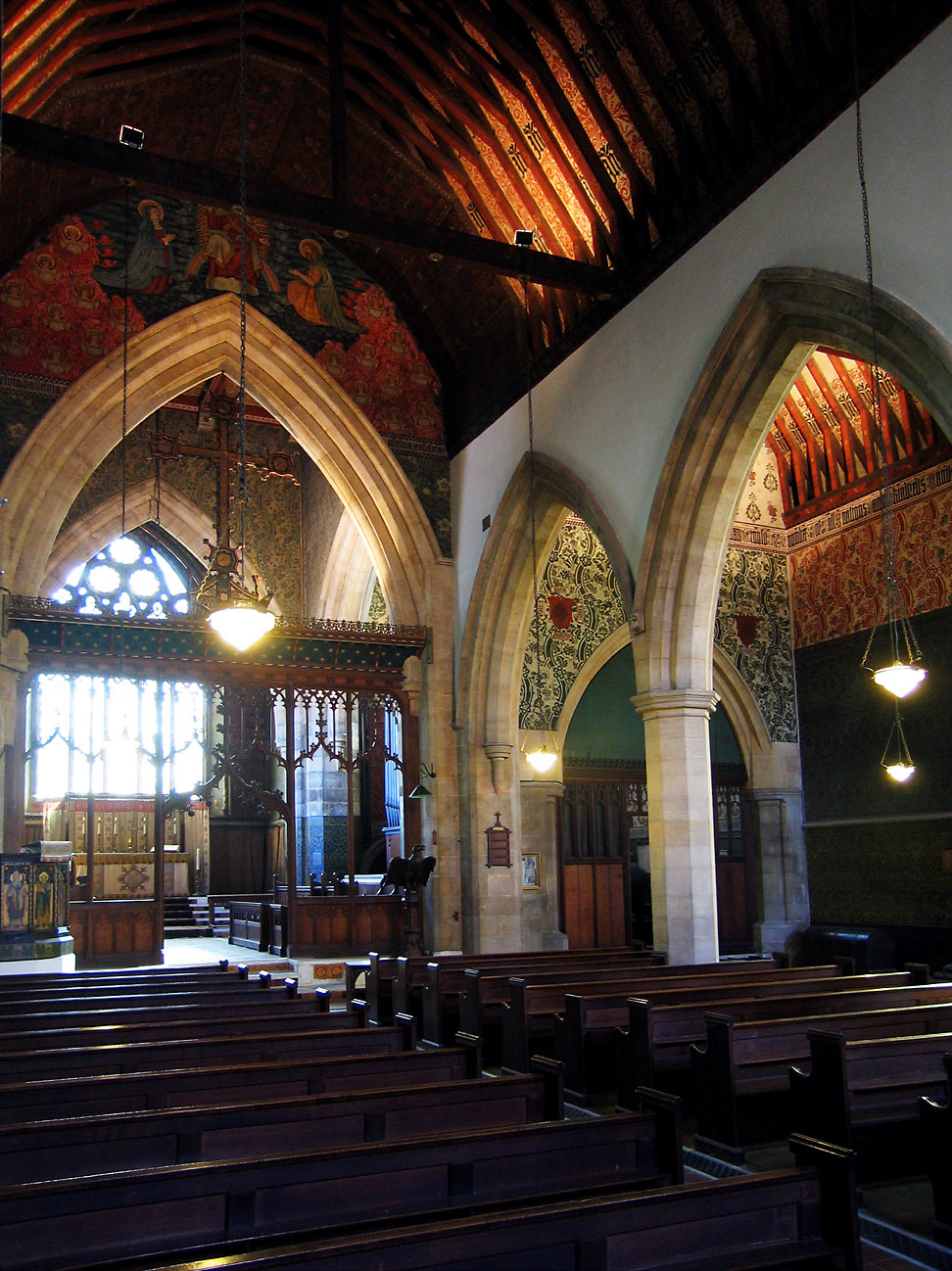
Richly decorated Arts and Crafts interior of All Saints', Cambridge.

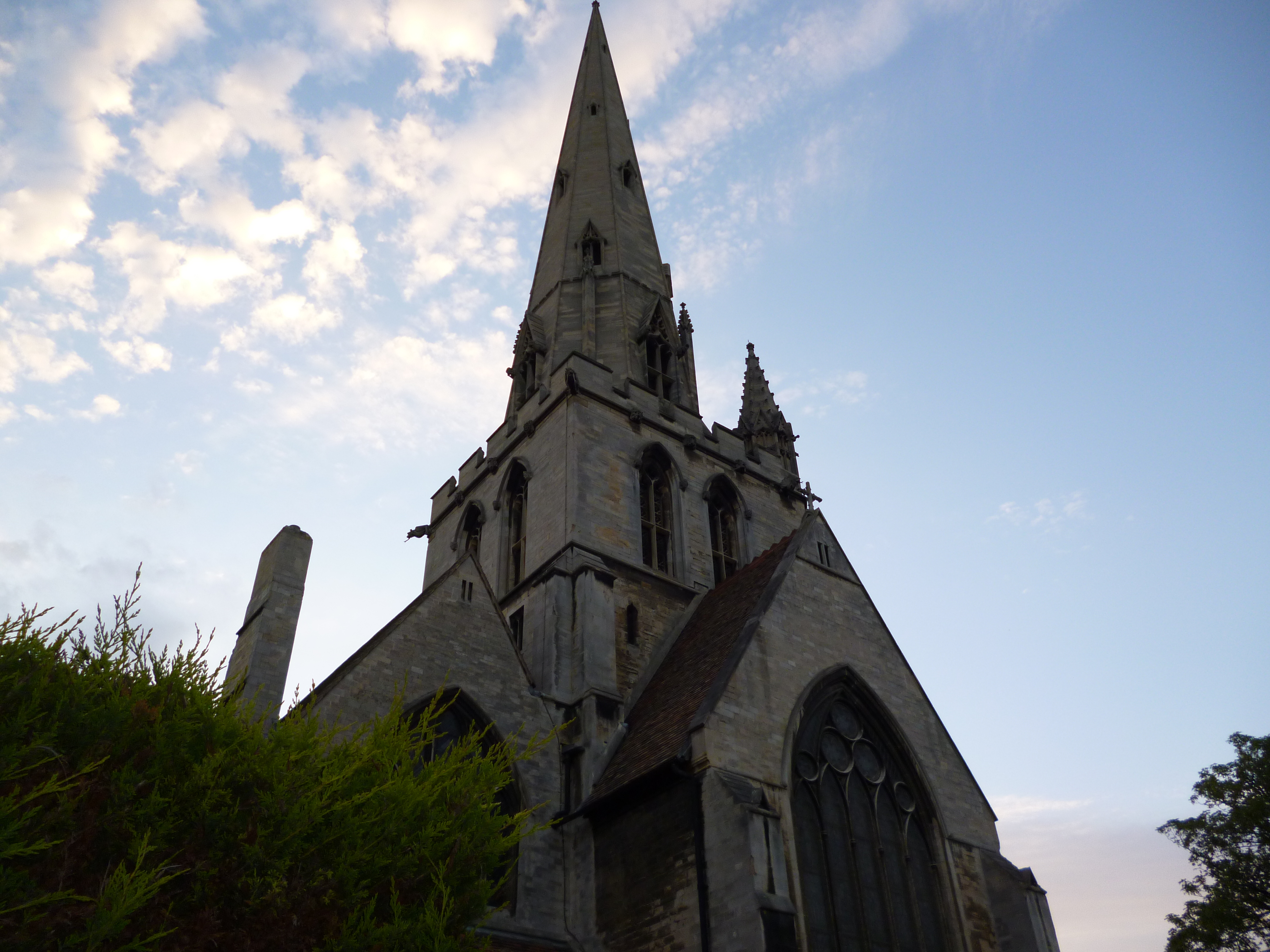
Alternative exterior view of All Saints', Cambridge

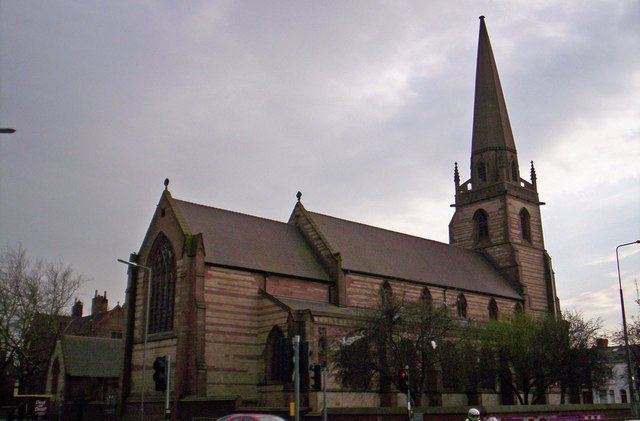
St John the Baptist Church, Tue Brook

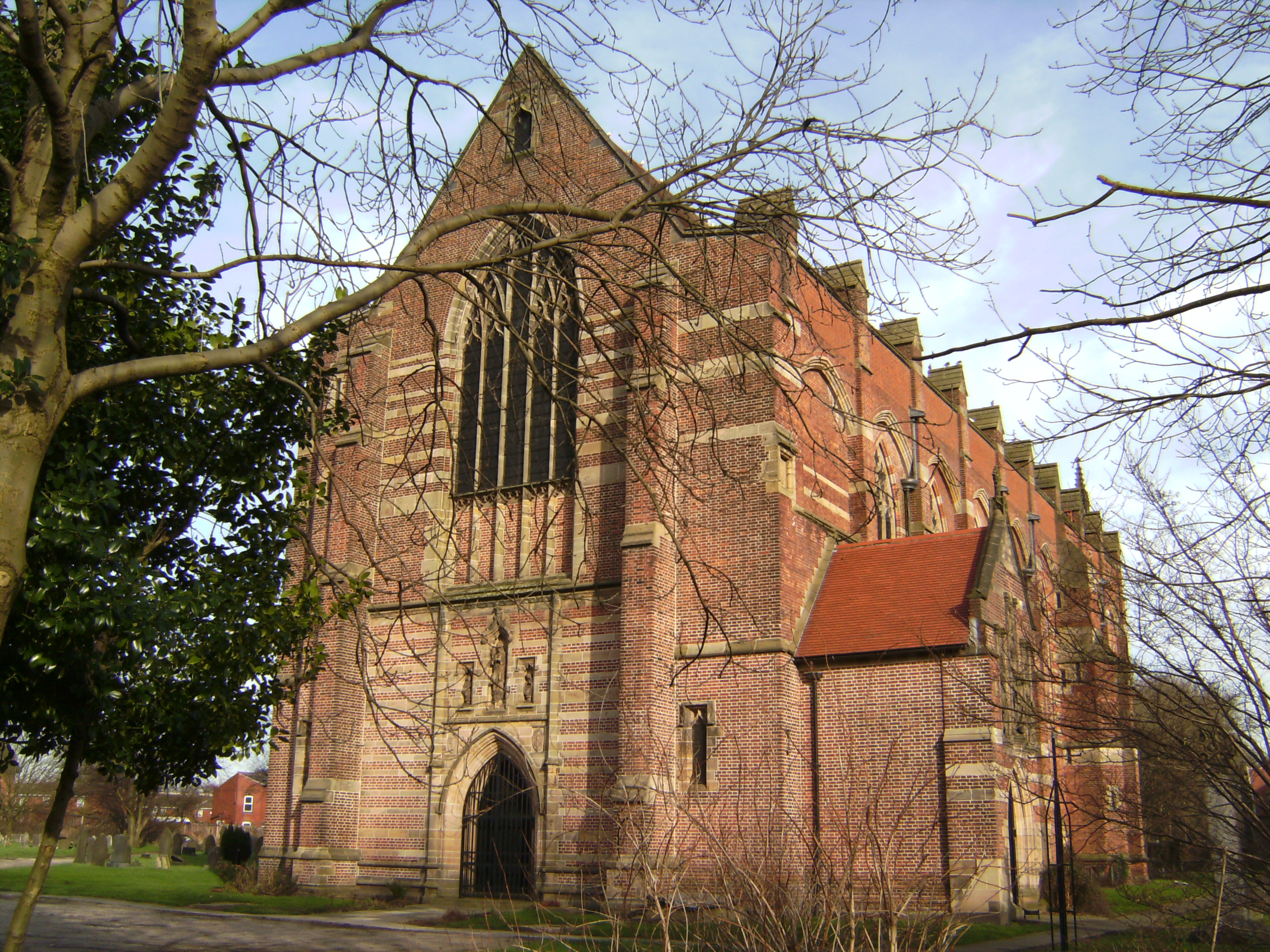
St Augustine's Church, Pendlebury

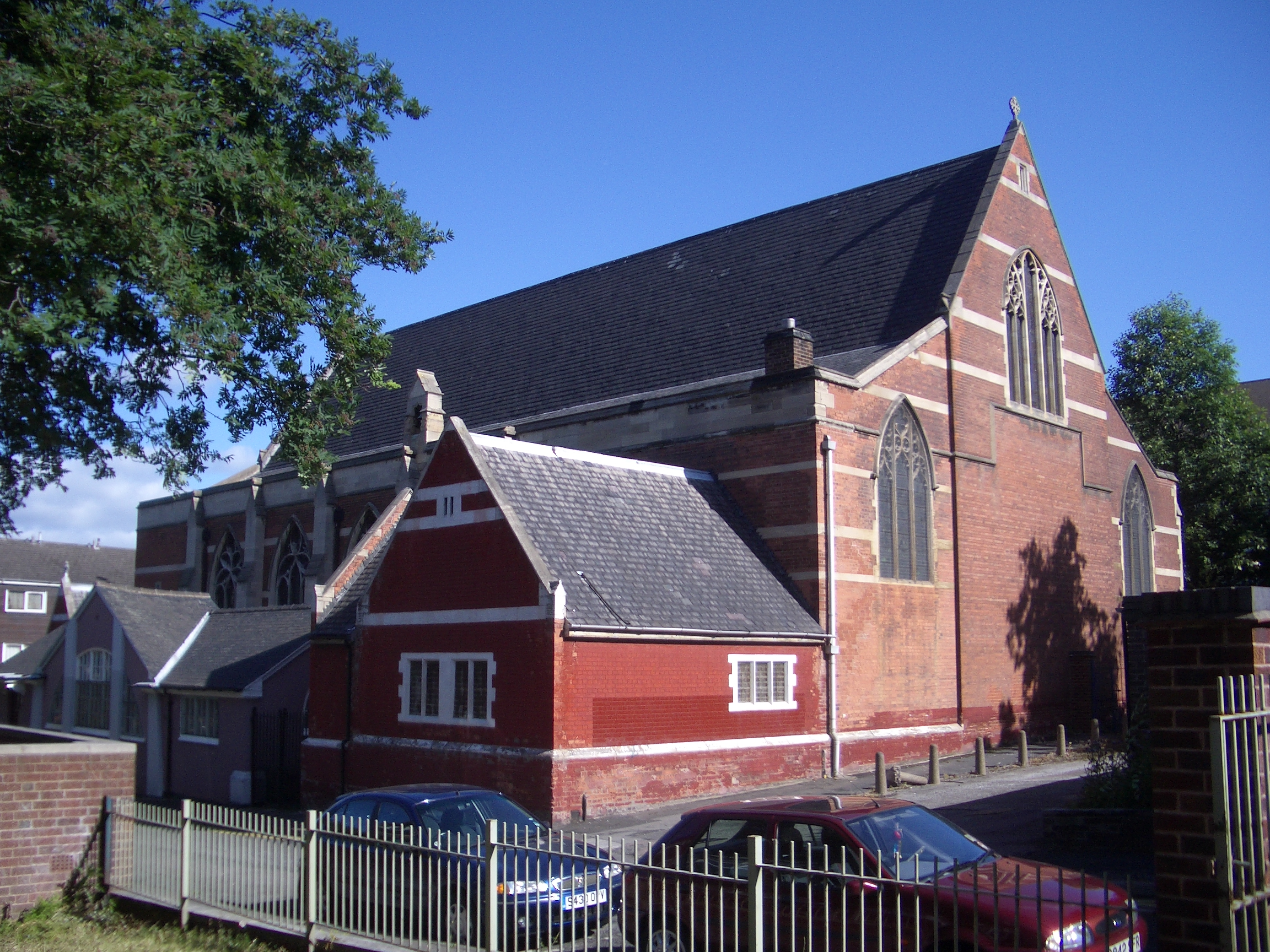
St Alban's Church, Sneinton, Nottingham

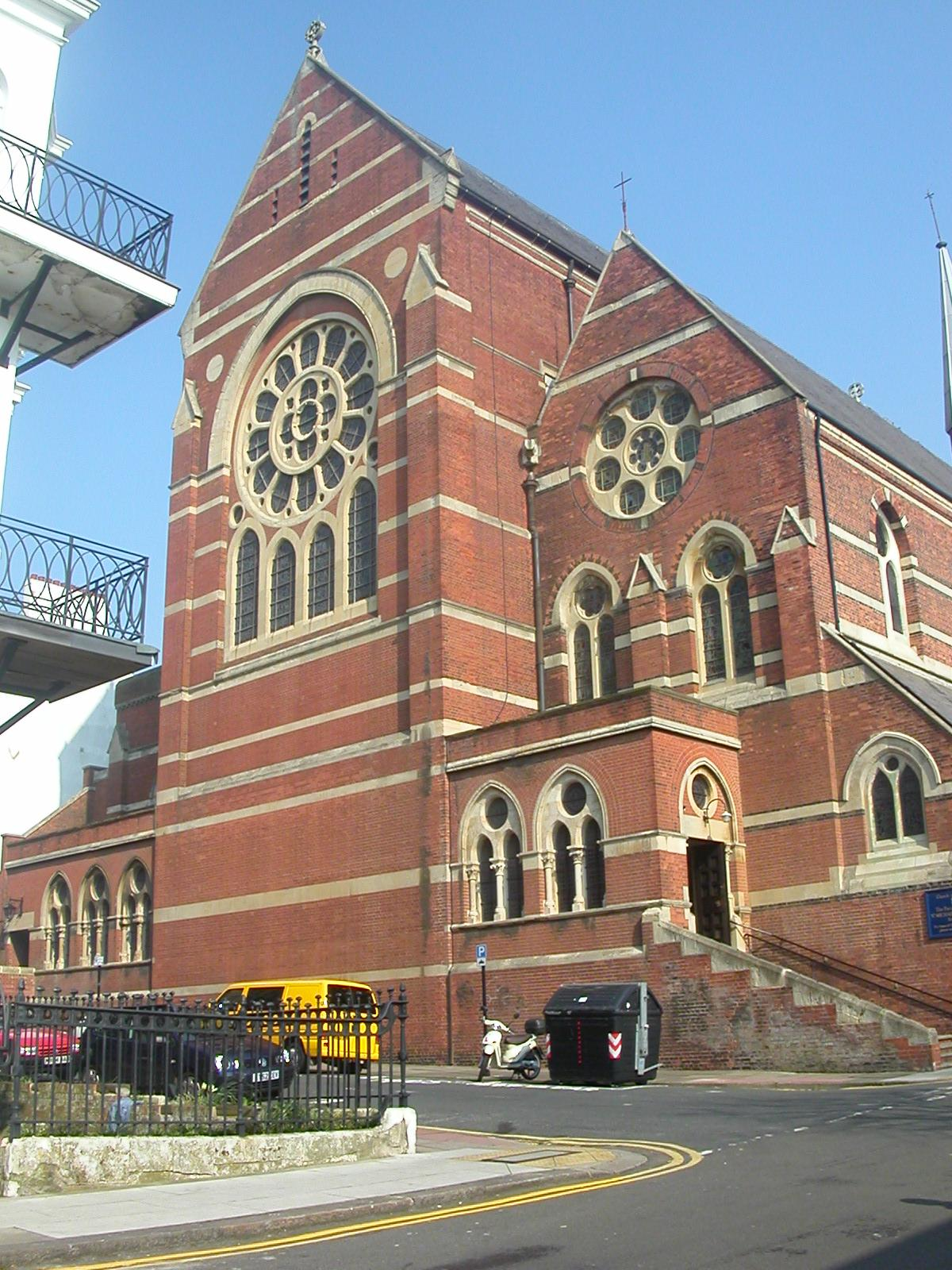
St Michael and All Angels' Church, Brighton

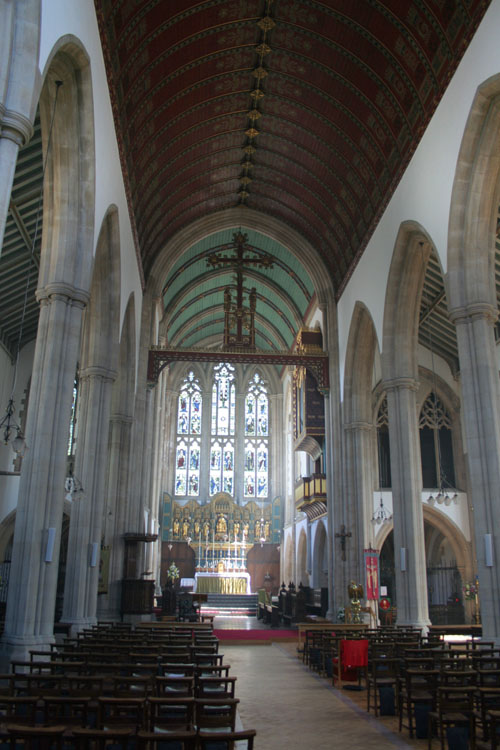
St German's Church, Cardiff (1884)

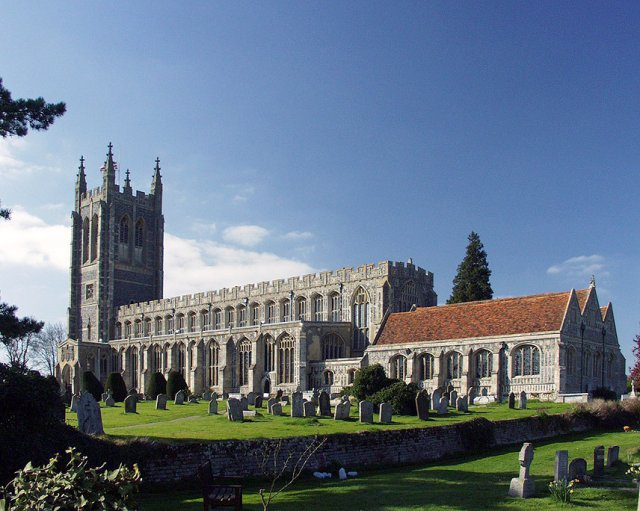
Holy Trinity Church, Long Melford

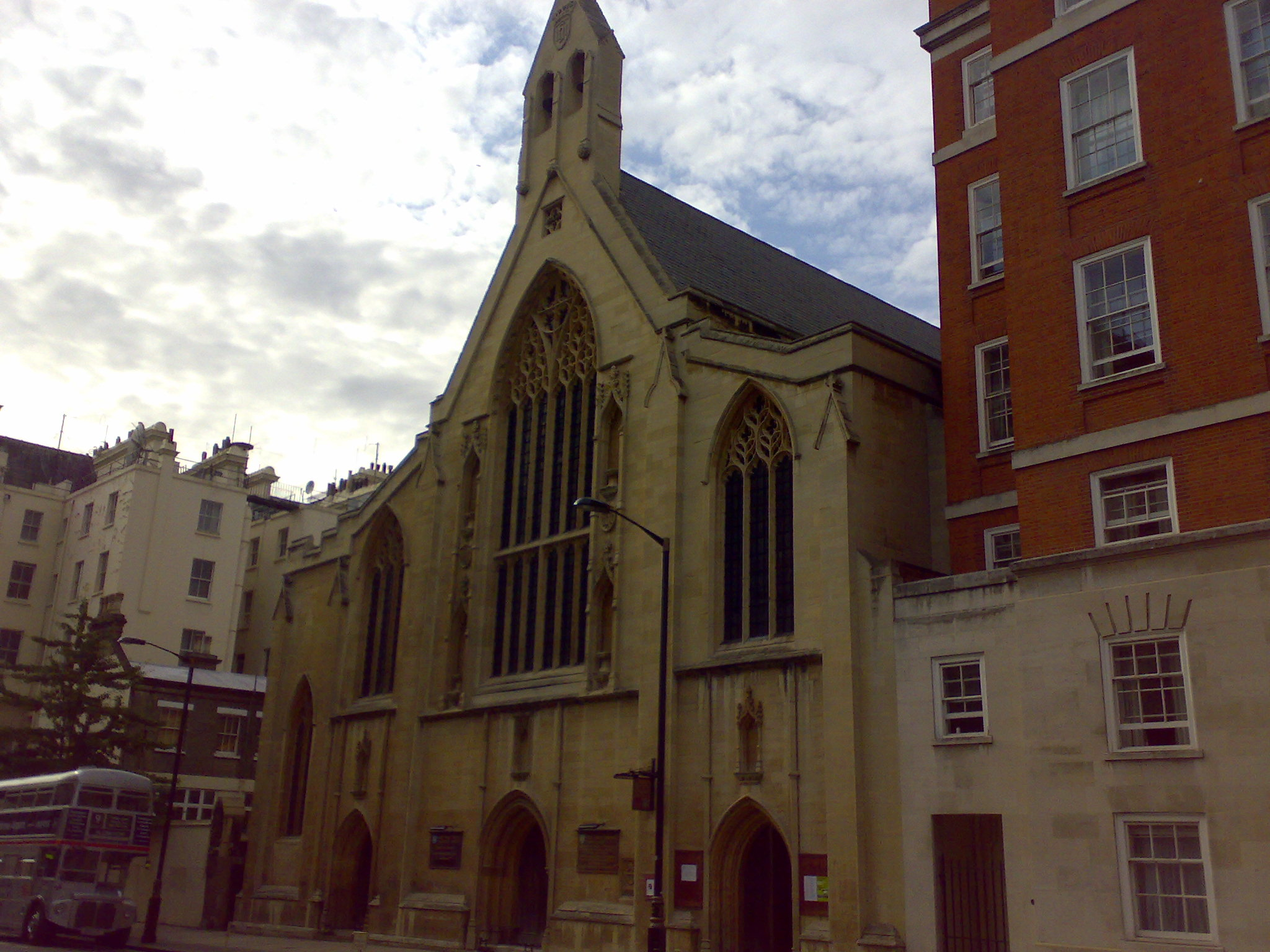
Holy Trinity Church, South Kensington

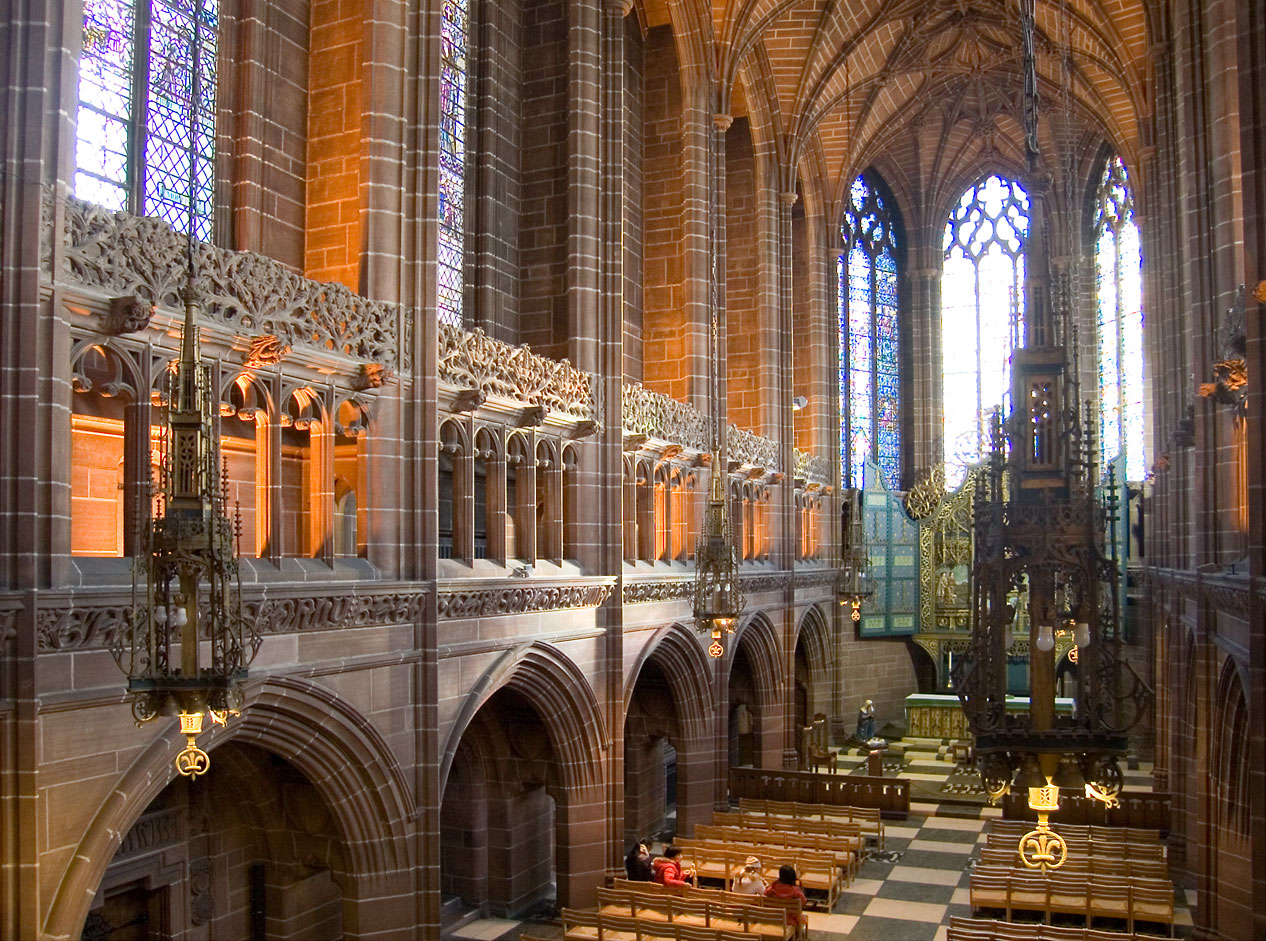
The Lady Chapel of Liverpool Cathedral.

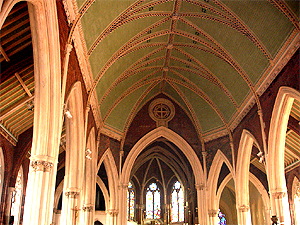
Interior of St John the Divine, Kennington

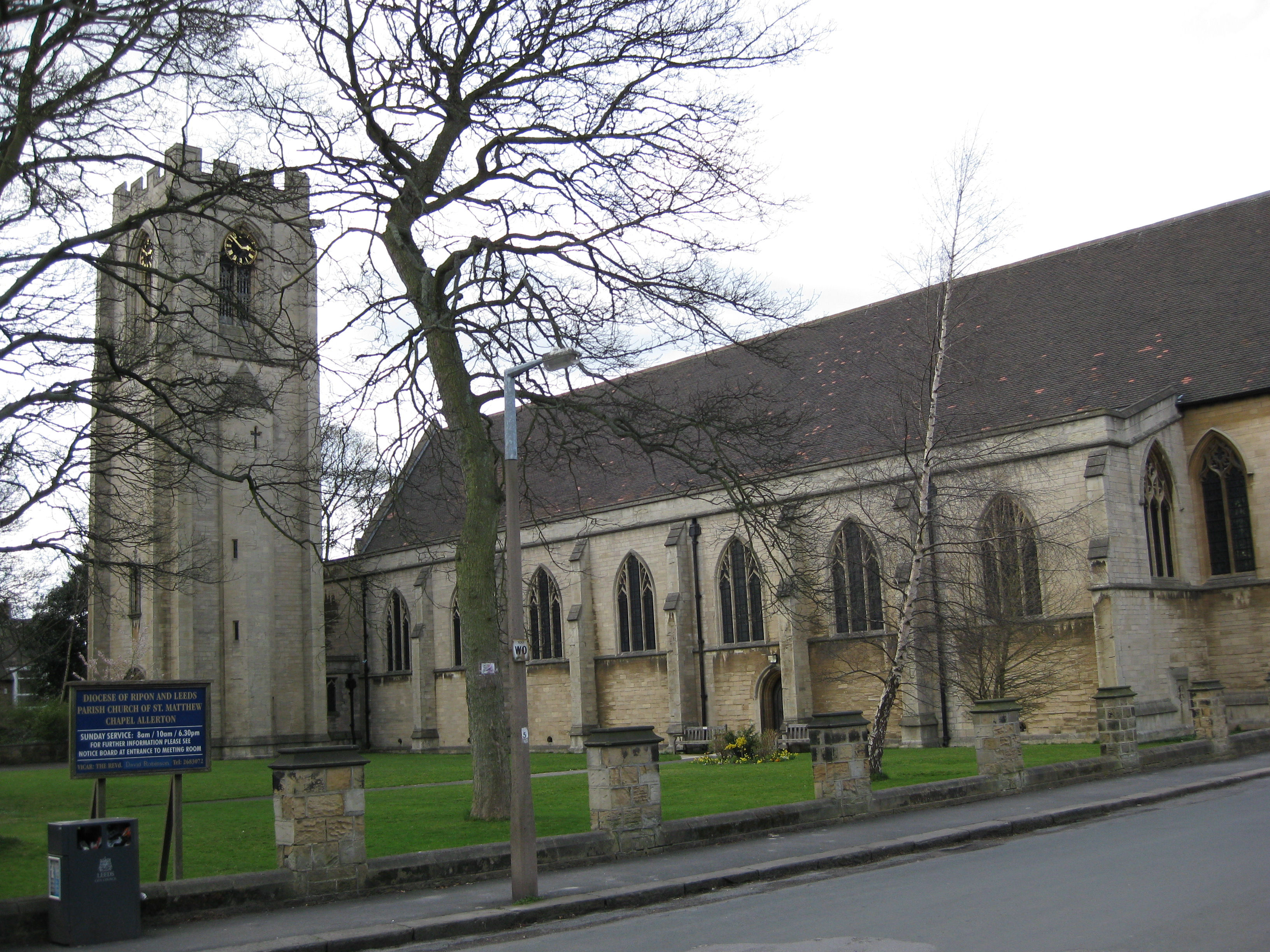
St Matthew's Church, Chapel Allerton, Leeds

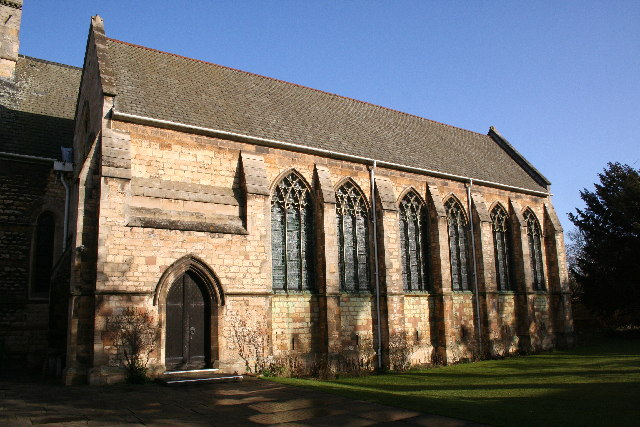
St Peter in Eastgate, Lincoln, is the combined work of three eminent architects - nave and chancel by Sir Arthur Blomfield (1870), south aisle by Temple Moore (1914) and the chancel decoration by Bodley (1884).

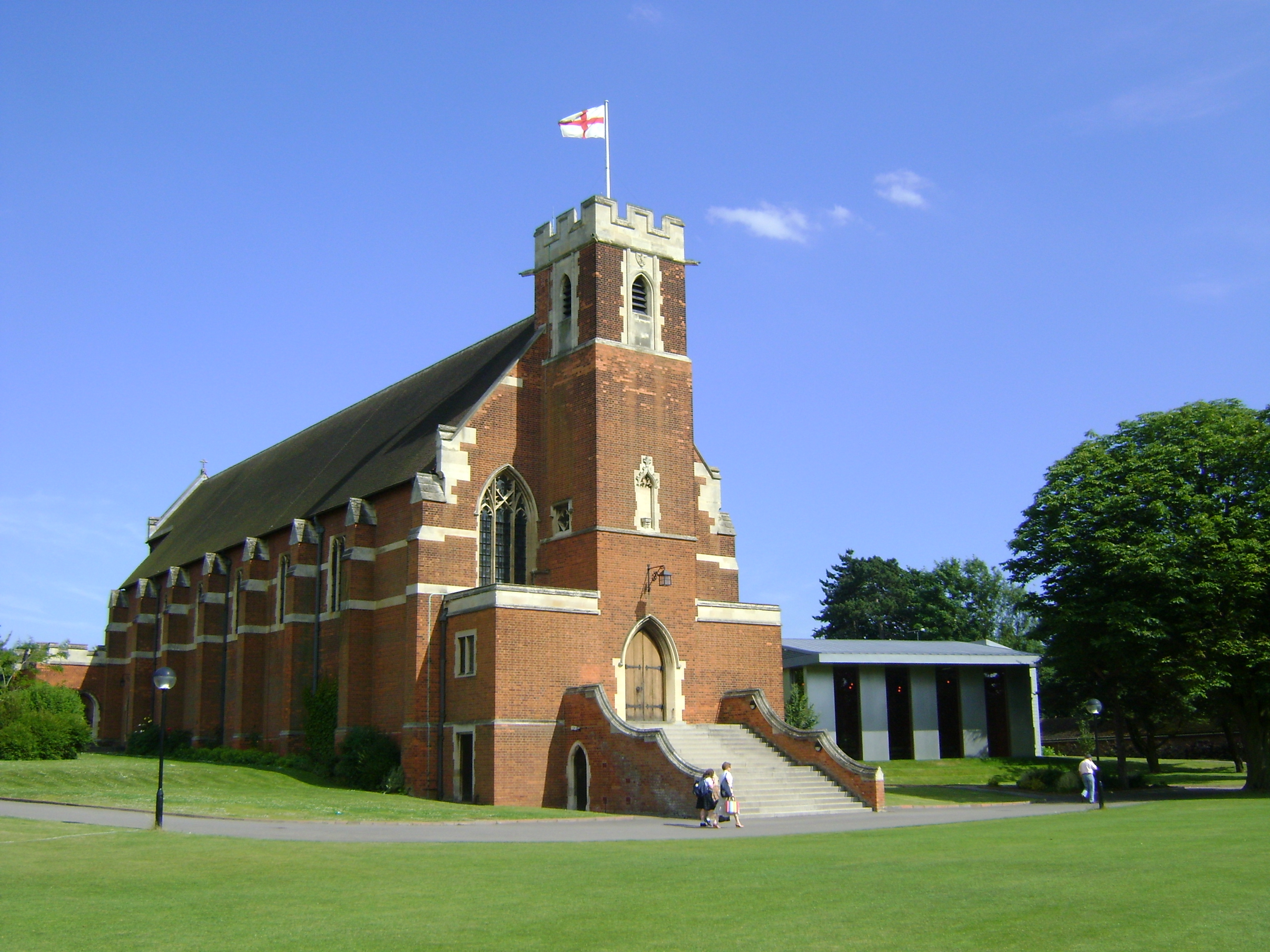
Bedford School Chapel, 1908 - his last work

== Works ==
=== New churches ===
- 1854–56 Christ Church, Long Grove, Herefordshire (now named Llangrove)
- 1854–58 St John the Baptist Church, Dimmelsdale, France Lynch, Gloucestershire
- 1855 Church of St Michael and All Angels, Brighton, Sussex
- 1857–74 St Salvador's Church, Dundee, Scotland
- 1860–68 All Saints' Church, Selsley, Gloucestershire
- 1861–62 St Martin on the Hill, Scarborough, Yorkshire
- 1861–65 St Wilfrid's Church, Haywards Heath, Sussex
- 1861–66 St Stephen's Church, St Peter Port, Guernsey with Benjamin Ferrey
- 1862 St Mary & St Mary Magdalene's Church, Brighton (demolished 1963)
- 1863–70 All Saints' Church, Jesus Lane, Cambridge
- 1865–71 St Simon's Church, St Helier, Jersey
- 1867–70 Church of Saint John the Baptist, Liverpool
- 1867–74 All Saints' Church, Falsgrave, Scarborough, Yorkshire
- 1868–70 Church of Saint John the Baptist, Liverpool
- 1868–1936 St David's Cathedral, Hobart
- 1871–73 St Michael's Church, Folkestone, Kent with Thomas Garner (now demolished)
- 1871 St Augustine's Church, Pendlebury near Manchester, Lancashire with Thomas Garner
- 1872 Church of the Holy Angels, Hoar Cross, Staffordshire with Thomas Garner
- 1874 St John the Divine, Kennington, London (interior)
- 1879–85 St Michael's Church, Camden Town, London with Thomas Garner
- 1880–86 St German's Church, Roath, Cardiff with Thomas Garner
- 1885–86 St Alban's Church, Sneinton, Nottinghamshire with Thomas Garner
- 1885-86 St Lawrence's Church, Ecchinswell, Hampshire with Thomas Garner
- 1886 Marlborough College chapel with Thomas Garner
- 1886–89 The Church of St Mary the Virgin, Clumber Park, Nottinghamshire
- 1887–95 St Saviour's Church, Splott, Cardiff with Thomas Garner
- 1889–92 Ascension Church, Woodlands, Dorset with Thomas Garner
- 1889–92 St Mary of Eton Church, Hackney Wick, London with Thomas Garner
- 1891 Queens' College chapel, Cambridge
- 1892–93 St Mary's Church, Horbury, Yorkshire with Thomas Garner
- 1892–94 St Aldhelm's Church, Poole, Dorset with Thomas Garner
- 1892–94 St Luke's Church, Warrington, Lancashire with Thomas Garner
- 1892–95 St Aidan's Church, Skelmanthorpe, Yorkshire with Thomas Garner
- 1894–95 Holy Innocents Church, South Norwood
- 1894–1902 St John the Evangelist, Iffley Road, Oxford
- 1897 St Matthew's Church Chapel Allerton, Leeds, Yorkshire
- 1898–1902 All Saints' Church, Weston-super-Mare, Somerset
- 1899 St Mary's Church, Eccleston, Cheshire
- 1899 St Bride's Church, Glasgow, Scotland
- 1901 Holy Trinity Church, Prince Consort Road, South Kensington, London with Cecil Greenwood Hare
- 1901 Mission Church, Hadley End, Staffordshire
- 1901–10 St Boniface's Church, Chandler's Ford, Hampshire
- 1903–04 St Aidan's Church, Bristol, Gloucestershire
- 1903–04 St Edward's Church, Holbeck, Leeds (demolished 1984)
- 1903–10 St Chad's Church, Burton-on-Trent, Staffordshire with Cecil Greenwood Hare
- 1905 St Faith's Church, Brentford, London with Cecil Greenwood Hare
- 1905–06 The Paraclete Church, Hom Green, Ross-on-Wye, Herefordshire
- 1905–06 Church of the Annunciation, Bournemouth, with Giles Gilbert Scott
- 1906–07 Bedford School chapel
- 1907 Washington National Cathedral, Washington, D.C., United States, with Henry Vaughan

=== Church repairs, alterations and furnishings ===
- 1859–63 St James' Church, Bicknor, Kent: new vestry, porch and roof, reseating and repairs to walls
- 1863–65 All Saints' Church, Coddington, Nottinghamshire: rebuild
- 1864–65 St James' Church, Wigmore, Herefordshire: repairs
- 1864–67 Jesus College Chapel, Cambridge: repairs
- 1866–69 St Michael & All Angels Church, Kingsland, Herefordshire: repairs
- 1868–70 St Mary's Church, Almeley, Herefordshire, with Thomas Garner: repairs
- 1868–70 St Nicholas's Church, South Kilworth, Leicestershire: repairs
- 1870–71 St Mary the Virgin, Barnsley, Yorkshire: repairs
- 1870–73 St Michael's Church, Lyonshall, Herefordshire: repairs
- 1871–72 St Mark's Church, Bilton, Warwickshire, with Thomas Garner: new north aisle, transept and organ chamber, with reseating, reflooring and general repairs to roofs and walls
- 1871–72 Church of St Mary Magdalene, Keyworth, Nottinghamshire: repairs
- 1871–72 St Laurence's Church, Rowington, Warwickshire, with Thomas Garner: repairs
- 1873 St Swithun's Church, East Retford Nottinghamshire: Chantry chapel rebuilt
- 1873–75 Church of St Mary the Virgin, Plumtree, Nottinghamshire, with Thomas Garner: decoration and new organ case
- 1873–79 St Michael's Church, Shalbourne, Berkshire, with Thomas Garner, new south aisle: reseating and general restoration
- 1874 St Helen's Church, Brant Broughton, Lincolnshire: new chancel and repairs
- 1874–78 St Peter & St Paul's Church, Langham, Rutland, with Thomas Garner: repairs to roof, walls, tower and belfry
- 1876–79 St Lawrence's Church, Oxhill, Warwickshire, with Thomas Garner: repairs
- 1876–88 St Wilfrid's Church, Hickleton, Yorkshire
- 1880 St Swithun's Church, Leonard Stanley, Gloucestershire
- 1880–83 St Laurence's Church, Frodsham, with Thomas Garner: restoration
- 1881–84 All Saints' Church, Nettleham, Lincolnshire, with Thomas Garner: new vestry and organ chamber, rebuilding and enlargement of chancel, rebuilding of porch and general repairs
- 1882–90 All Saints' Church, Bedworth, Warwickshire, with Thomas Garner: rebuild
- 1884 St Mary's Church, Clifton, Nottinghamshire
- 1885 St Michael's Church, Kirk Langley, Derbyshire, with Thomas Garner: restoration
- 1886–88 St Manakneu's Church, Lanreath, Cornwall, with Thomas Garner: repairs
- 1887 Church of St Giles, Wimborne St Giles, Dorset, remodelling in the Gothic style
- 1889–91 St Giles' Church, Mountnessing, Essex, with Thomas Garner: new vestry/organ chamber, four new nave windows, reseating and general repairs to roof and walls
- 1889–92 St John the Baptist Church, Epping, Essex, with Thomas Garner: rebuild
- 1890 St John the Divine, Kennington, London (interior)
- 1890 St Mary's Church, Nottingham (chapter house)
- 1890 St Saviour's Church, Ellerby Road, Leeds: addition of Pusey chapel.
- 1890–99 St Andrew's Church, Chelmondiston, Suffolk, with Thomas Garner: enlargement
- 1891–1905 All Saints' Church, St Paul's Walden, Hertfordshire, with Thomas Garner: new vestry, new west window in south aisle, reseating and general repairs to roof and walls
- 1892 Holy Trinity Church, Markbeech, Kent: new chancel
- 1892 St Paul's Church, Knightsbridge: new chancel, rood screen and reredos
- 1895 St Martin's Church, Womersley, Yorkshire: rood screen and loft, nave and chancel roof decoration
- 1897 St George in the Meadows, Nottingham: added chancel
- 1898 St Bartholomew's Church, Wilmslow: clerestory added to chancel
- 1898–1903 Holy Trinity Church, Long Melford: refurbishment of main tower
- 1898–1905 St Bartholomew's Church, Reading, Berkshire: new chancel, north chapel, vestry and chapel at east end of south aisle
- 1898–1905 St Paul's Church, Bedford: reorder chancel, restore choir stalls and new rood screen
- 1899–1901 All Saints' Church, East Horndon, Essex: repairs
- 1899–1904 St Carantoc's Church, Crantock, Cornwall, with Edmund Harold Sedding: repairs
- 1900–01 St Nicholas' Church, Little Bowden, Northamptonshire: repairs
- 1901 St Peter's Church, Hartshorne, Derbyshire: enlargement
- 1901 St Mary's Church, Whitkirk, Leeds: rebuilt
- 1902–05 St Mary the Virgin, Barton Mills, Suffolk: repairs
- 1903 St Stephen's, Gloucester Road, London, with Walter Tapper: new reredos and other alterations
- 1903–04 Christ Church, Mold Green, Kirkheaton, Yorkshire: new chancel, vestry & organ chamber
- 1904 St Bartholomew's Church, Elvaston repairs and rebuilding of the chancel
- 1905–07 St Nicholas' Church, Skirbeck, Lincolnshire: new vestries, organ chamber and porches, several new windows, rebuilding of chancel, reseating and general repairs
- 1906 Church of the Annunciation to the Blessed Virgin Mary, Souldern: dismantled and rebuilt bell tower and tower arch
- 1906 Holy Angels Church, Lilliput Road, Poole, Dorset: rood screen, choir stalls and organ case
- 1906 St Barnabas Church, Pimlico, London: reredos, rood screen and (with Hill and Son) organ case
- 1907 St Barnabas Church, Hove: reredos
- 1907–09 All Saints' Church, Kedleston: north aisle
- St Paul's, Burton upon Trent: alterations

=== Secular buildings ===
- 1856 National School, Haywards Heath, Sussex
- 1870 Queens' College Old Hall, Cambridge, decoration
- 1872–76 Offices of the London School Board (with Thomas Garner), (demolished 1929)
- The Wodehouse near Wombourne, for the Shaw-Hellier family
- Hewell Grange
- 1905: Second Boer War Memorial, York

== Sources ==
- Lee, Sidney, ed. (1912). "Bodley, George Frederick" . Dictionary of National Biography (2nd supplement). Vol. 1. London: Smith, Elder & Co. pp. 187–190.
- Homan, Roger (1984). The Victorian Churches of Kent. Chichester: Phillimore & Co. Ltd. ISBN 0-85033-466-7.
- Newman, John; Pevsner, Nikolaus (1972). Dorset. The Buildings of England. Harmondsworth: Penguin Books. ISBN 0-14-071044-2.
- Pevsner, Nikolaus (1951). Nottinghamshire. The Buildings of England. Harmondsworth: Penguin Books.
- Pevsner, Nikolaus (1963). Herefordshire. The Buildings of England. Harmondsworth: Penguin Books.
- Pevsner, Nikolaus (1966). Berkshire. The Buildings of England. Harmondsworth: Penguin Books.
- Pevsner, Nikolaus (1973) [1966]. Buckinghamshire. The Buildings of England. Harmondsworth: Penguin Books. ISBN 0-14-071019-1.
- Pevsner, Nikolaus (1968). Worcestershire. The Buildings of England. Harmondsworth: Penguin Books.
- Pevsner, Nikolaus; Cherry, Bridget (1973) [1961]. Northamptonshire. The Buildings of England. Harmondsworth: Penguin Books. ISBN 0-14-071022-1.
- Pevsner, Nikolaus; Cherry, Bridget (revision) (1975) [1963]. Wiltshire. The Buildings of England. Harmondsworth: Penguin Books. ISBN 0-14-0710-26-4.
- Pevsner, Nikolaus; Lloyd, David (1967). Hampshire and the Isle of Wight. The Buildings of England. Harmondsworth: Penguin Books.
- Pevsner, Nikolaus; Wedgwood, Alexandra (1966). Warwickshire. The Buildings of England. Harmondsworth: Penguin Books.
- Sherwood, Jennifer; Pevsner, Nikolaus (1974). Oxfordshire. The Buildings of England. Harmondsworth: Penguin Books. ISBN 0-14-071045-0.
- Verey, David (1970). Gloucestershire: The Cotswolds. The Buildings of England. Harmondsworth: Penguin Books. ISBN 0-14-071040-X.
- Williamson, Elizabeth; Hudson, Tim; Musson, Jeremy; Nairn, Ian (2019). Sussex: West. The Buildings of England. New Haven and London: Yale University Press. ISBN 978-0-300-22521-1.
