= Harry Smith Trevitt =

Harry Smith Trevitt FRCO (5 June 1878 – 1979) was an organist and composer based in England.

== Life ==
He was born in 1879 in Walkden, Lancashire, to Harry Trevitt, journalist.

He was an articled pupil at Lincoln Cathedral. He attained his ARCO in 1899 and his FRCO in 1901.

In 1914 he married Ethel Mary Clark

He died in 1979 in Lincoln, aged 101.

== Appointments ==
- Organist of St. Faith's Church, Lincoln ???? – 1897
- Organist of Syston Church, Grantham 1897 – ????
- Organist of Branston Church ca. 1899
- Organist of St. Martin's Church, Lincoln. 1903
- Assistant organist of Lincoln Cathedral 1899 – 1903?
- Organist of St. Peter in Eastgate, Lincoln 1904-1948

== Compositions ==
He composed organ and church music.
