= Watts & Co. =

English architectural and interior design company

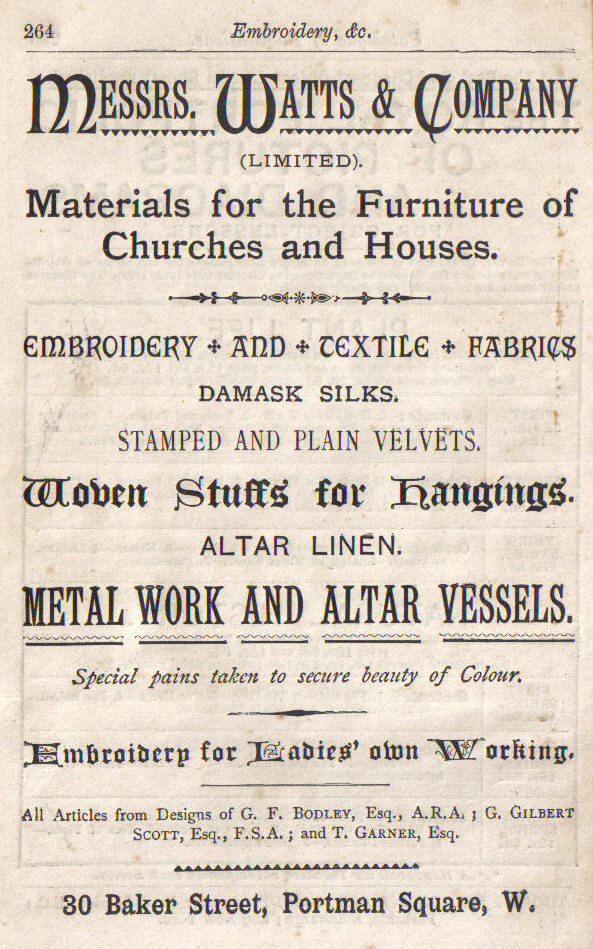
Advertisement from the Illustrated Guide to the Church Congress 1897

Watts & Co. is a prominent architecture and interior design company established in England in 1874. It is a survivor from the Gothic Revival of the nineteenth century: a firm founded in 1874 by three leading late-Victorian church architects – George Frederick Bodley, Thomas Garner and Gilbert Scott the younger – to produce furniture, textiles, stained glass windows, and needlework in a style distinctively their own. Today, the company is mainly known for its clerical vestments and textile church furnishings.

The company has retail premises at Faith House in Tufton Street, Westminster.

== History ==
The partners were all pupils of Sir George Gilbert Scott, whose work includes the Albert Memorial, the Foreign and Commonwealth Office, the St Pancras Hotel, St Mary's Cathedral, Edinburgh, many churches, cathedral restorations and country houses. The motivating force was Bodley, himself one of the most scholarly, fastidious and refined architects of his generation, a designer not only of such churches as the Church of the Holy Angels, Hoar Cross, Staffordshire, and, with his first pupil Henry Vaughan, of the National Cathedral of Ss Peter & Paul, Washington DC, but also of country houses and the restorations of castles and bishops’ palaces.

In 1868 Bodley formed a partnership with one of the most brilliant pupils in Scott's office, Thomas Garner. Unable to find firms to carry out furnishings and wallpaper to their satisfaction they established two companies: Burlison and Grylls and Watts & Co. The former, under the aegis of Garner, produced stained glass and painted decoration for furniture, roofs and walls. The second, founded in associations with Sir Gilbert's elder son, provided embroidery, textiles, wallpaper, domestic furniture, and metalwork. Bodley was the first chairman.

The designs made by the founders for the firm were among the most original and distinctive of their time, rivalled only the work of Morris & Co., with whom Watts was in friendly competition. All three were captivated by the ethereal beauty of the late–gothic art of Northern Europe and the sturdy refinement of the English Renaissance House. Both were their inspiration and from such rich sources they produced designs of fertile invention in which the elaboration of detail is controlled by simplicity, strength and restraint, giving their work a timeless quality transcending period limitation.

Although Watt's designs were primarily for use in the partners’ own work they have always been sold commercially and have been used extensively by many leading architects and designers, Bodley's pupil, Sir Ninian Comper, used their fabrics in his early work and in restorations after the Second World War. Sir Giles Gilbert Scott, Temple Moore and Sir Walter Tapper used Watts exclusively: the American architect, Ralph Adams Cram, imported Watt's fabrics for many of his noble churches.

== 20th and 21st centuries ==
In the late 1950s, Robert Maguire and Keith Murray broke new ground with their pioneering Church of St Paul, Bow Common, for which Watts executed the contemporary fittings. The work of Stephen Dykes Bower, in Westminster Abbey, Bury St Edmunds Cathedral and elsewhere, is inextricably associated with Watt's textiles and embroidery.

The great country house architects, Sir Edwin Lutyens and Sir Robert Lorimer, used their wallpapers in their classic interiors; while Lutyens used Watts fabric for upholstering the viceregal thrones in Government House, New Delhi.

Watts wallpapers and textiles were designed for distinguished settings. Still in production, they have in recent years been used extensively in restoration work by the National Trust, in the Houses of Parliament, in colleges at Oxford and Cambridge, and by architects and decorators involved in the conservation of historic buildings. So excellent are the designs in themselves that they have continued to be used privately in houses old and new.

From the firm's foundation, church embroidery has been in the forefront of their work. Numberless altar frontals, banners, hangings and vestments are found in cathedrals, churches, and chapels throughout the world. Watts are still renowned for their high standard of embroidery and needlework, specialising in traditional methods. In 1986, in recognition of their work, the firm was honoured with a Royal Warrant, appointing them ecclesiastical furnishers to Queen Elizabeth II.

Watts has always been a family firm. Bodley was an uncle of George Gilbert Scott the Younger. From 1951, until her death in 2001, Elizabeth Hoare, a granddaughter of George Scott the Younger and great-grand niece of Bodley, was the firm's Director. Today, her children and now grandchildren continue the business.

In 2024, Watts purchased a longstanding rival company, J. Wippell & Co., which had ceased operations in the previous year. Subsequently, Watts announced the renewal of operations for the J. Wippell & Co. brand. Watts's profits for that year were almost £279,000.
