= Grade I listed churches in Staffordshire =

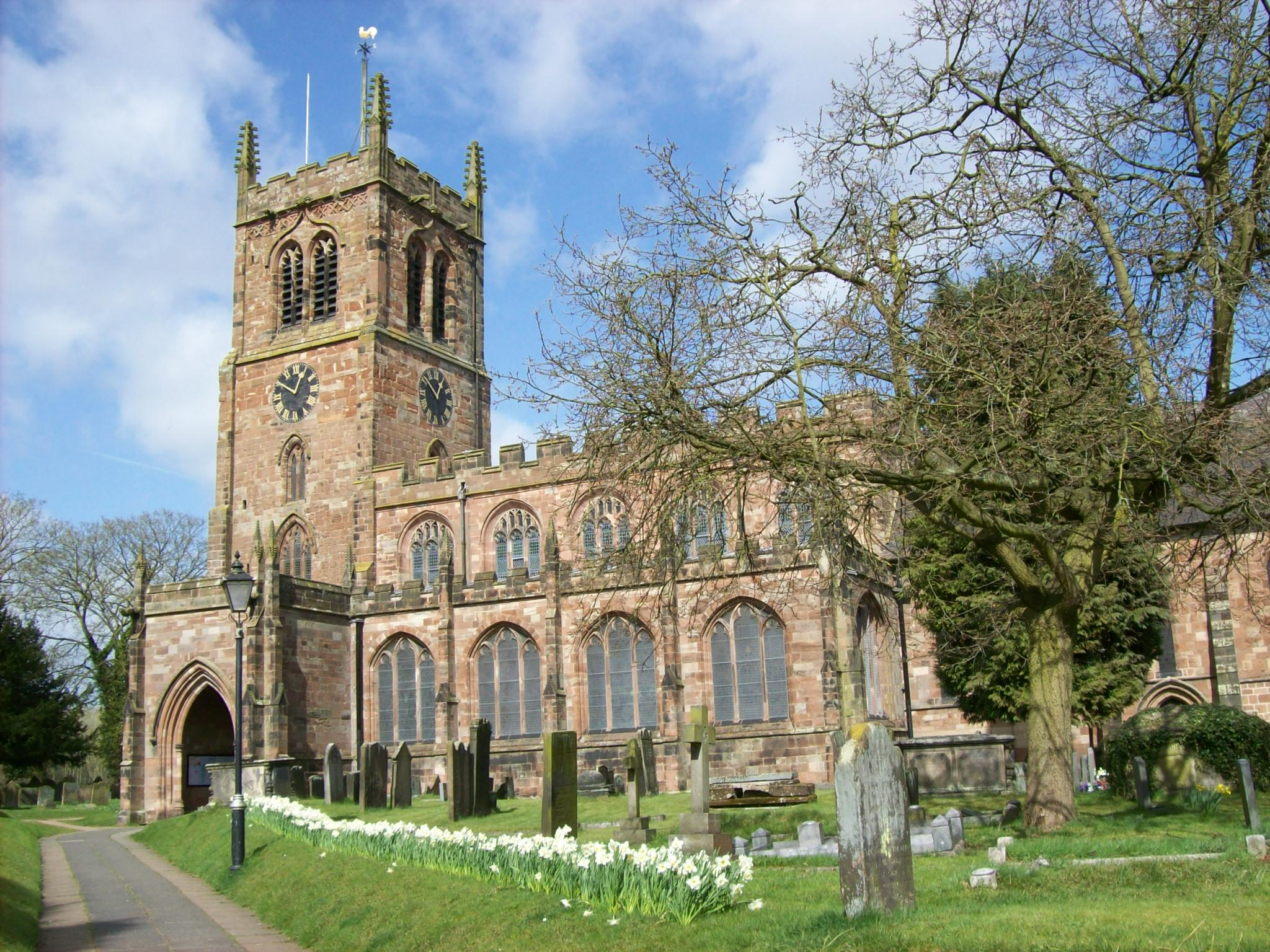
Holy Trinity Church, Eccleshall

Staffordshire is a county in the West Midlands region of England. In 1974 the historical county of Staffordshire was combined with the unitary authority of Stoke-on-Trent to form the ceremonial county of Staffordshire.

In England, buildings are given listed building status by the Secretary of State for Culture, Media and Sport, acting on the recommendation of English Heritage. This gives the structure national recognition and protection against alteration or demolition without authorisation. Grade I listed buildings are defined as being of "exceptional interest, sometimes considered to be internationally important"; only 2.5 per cent of listed buildings are included in this grade. This is a complete list of Grade I listed churches and chapels in Staffordshire as recorded in the National Heritage List for England.

Christian churches have existed in Staffordshire since the Anglo-Saxon era, but few Saxon features remain in its Grade I listed churches. The churches that do contain such fabric are Holy Cross, Ilam, and St Editha, Tamworth. Norman architecture is found in more churches, including All Saints, Alrewas, All Saints, Chebsey, and All Saints, Lapley. Otherwise most of the churches in the list are mainly in Gothic, and those restored during the 19th century contain Gothic Revival features. The only Neoclassical building in the list is St Mary, Ingestre. Four of the churches were built in the 19th or 20th century: these are A. W. N. Pugin's St Giles, Cheadle (1841–46), G. F. Bodley's Holy Angels, Hoar Cross (1872–76), Richard Norman Shaw's All Saints, Leek (1885–87), and Bodley's St Chad, Burton-on-Trent (1903–10). Few timber-framed buildings are found in the county; the only example in the list is St Margaret, Betley, which has a timber-framed core.

The county town is Stafford, but the largest settlement is Stoke-on-Trent, and the cathedral city is Lichfield. Industry is concentrated mainly in and around Stoke-on-Trent (an area known as the Potteries because of its production of ceramics. Most of the county is rural, with an agricultural economy. The greatest proportion of the county's bedrock is sandstone, with some limestone deposits; these provide the major building materials for the churches.

== Churches ==
Name	Location	Photograph	Notes
All Saints	Alrewas; 52.7348°N 1.7531°W		Both the north and the west doorways are Norman; both have been re-set. Additions were made to the church during the 14th and 16th centuries, and again in 1891. In the south wall of the chancel are a sedilia and a piscina, and on the north wall are the remains of a 15th-century wall painting. The font is from the 15th century, and the pulpit is dated 1639. The reredos of 1892 was designed by Basil Champneys.
St Peter	Alstonefield; 53.0951°N 1.8032°W		The oldest parts of the church are a doorway and a chancel arch, both Norman. The church was partly rebuilt in the 13th and 14th centuries, with alterations in the 16th, 17th and 18th centuries, and a restoration in 1870. Much of the furnishings are Jacobean, including the two-decker pulpit, box pews, the Cotton Pew, the lectern, and a screen. Also in the church are fragments of Anglo-Saxon carved stones and, in the chancel, a double aumbry.
St Margaret	Betley; 53.0328°N 2.3659°W		St Margaret's has a timber-framed core dating from about 1500, later encased in sandstone. The arcades are in timber. The chancel was rebuilt in 1610, and the west tower dates from the early 18th century. In 1842 Scott and Moffatt carried out a restoration; the timber framed clerestory and porches are from this period. The pulpit is Jacobean, and the font dates probably from the 13th century.
St Leonard	Blithfield; 52.8134°N 1.9360°W		The church was built in about 1300. In 1829–30 an octagonal north vestry was added as a memorial chapel for the Bagot family. The chancel was restored by A. W. N. Pugin in 1846, and the south porch was added in 1860 by George Gilbert Scott. Inside the church is a 12th-century piscina and a 14th-century font. The church contains the largest set of 15th-century bench ends in the county; these are carved with tracery and poppyheads. The 15th-century rood screen was restored in 1881 by G. F. Bodley. Also in the church are monuments to the Bagot family dating from the 16th century.
St Bartholomew	Blore; 53.0410°N 1.7966°W		Probably based on a 13th-century core, the church was remodelled in the early 16th century, and most of the church remains little changed since then. Much if it is in Perpendicular style, including the roofs and arcades. Inside the church is Jacobean furniture, including benches, the pulpit, the communion rail, stalls, and panelling in the chancel. The monuments date from the early 17th century.
St Mary	Blymhill; 52.7074°N 2.2848°W		The tower, chancel and the south arcade date from the 14th and 15th centuries, but the rest of the church was designed by G. E. Street in Early English style, and built between 1856 and 1859. Dormer windows were added to the south side of the church in 1876. Most of the fittings and furniture were designed by Street. The stained glass is by Wailes, by Burlison and Grylls, and by Hardman.
St Mary and All Saints	Bradley; 52.7599°N 2.1799°W		The church dates from the late 13th and the early 14th centuries. Norman stones are incorporated into the west wall of the tower. The northeast Lady Chapel was dedicated in 1343, and the north arcade is from the middle of the 14th century. In the early 16th century the nave was rebuilt. W. D. Caroe restored the church in 1902–03, and designed the chancel screen. In the east wall of the chancel are the remains of a 14th-century reredos. The font is Norman.
St Mary and St Chad	Brewood; 52.6755°N 2.1738°W		The chancel dates from the 13th century, and has lancet windows on the sides. The tower is from the 16th century, and is in Perpendicular style. In 1878–80 the church was restored by G. E. Street. The pulpit was designed by Street, and the reredos of 1911 is by W. D. Caroe. There are monuments in the church dating from the 16th and 17th centuries.
St Peter	Broughton; 52.9003°N 2.3491°W		St Peter's was built between 1630 and 1640, and contains box pews that are dated 1711. The stained glass in the east window dates from the 15th century, and there is 17th-century heraldic glass in the chancel. The windows in the south aisle were designed by C. E. Kempe.
St Chad	Burton upon Trent; 52.8173°N 1.6362°W		This church was designed in 1903 by G. F. Bodley, and completed after his death in 1910 by his partner Cecil Greenwood Hare. It was paid for by the 1st Baron Burton at a cost of £38,000. The church is in Decorated style. The northwest tower stands separately from the church, and is joined to it by a corridor. In the north chapel, the reredos was also designed by Bodley.
St Modwen	Burton upon Trent; 52.8014°N 1.6292°W		Built between 1719 and 1726, the church was designed by William and Richard Smith and completed by Francis Smith. It is in Palladian style. The interior was remodelled in 1889 by W. Tate. The summit of the west tower is surmounted by a balustrade and urns. Inside the church is a gallery carried on Tuscan columns. The font dates from the 15th century. Also in the church is a monument by Sir Richard Westmacott.
St Giles	Cheadle; 52.9860°N 1.9890°W		This is a Roman Catholic church built between 1841 and 1846, and designed by A. W. N. Pugin for John Talbot, the 16th Earl of Shrewsbury. It is in Decorated style, and is highly decorated on the outside and the inside, and has a tall steeple. The interior is painted throughout, and is floored with patterned tiles. Almost all the furniture and fittings were designed by Pugin, including the piscina, sedilia, a recess for an Easter Sepulchre, the reredos, font, font cover, pulpit, and screen.
All Saints	Chebsey; 52.8546°N 2.2098°W		There is Norman material in the walls of the nave and chancel, including a north doorway. The south arcade, the south doorway, and the chancel arch are Early English, and the west tower, with its eight pinnacles, is Perpendicular. The communion rail is dated 1682. Some of the windows contain stained glass by C. E. Kempe.
St Mary and All Saints	Checkley; 52.9384°N 1.9598°W		The earliest fabric in the church dates from the 12th century, with a south doorway of about 1300, and a chancel from the late 13th century. There were additions and alterations in the following two centuries, but the church was largely rebuilt in the 17th century. Inside the church is a Norman font with a carving of a donkey, the effigy of a knight on a memorial from the early 14th century, and some stained glass also from the 14th century. The stalls date from about 1535.
St Andrew	Clifton Campville; 52.6941°N 1.6272°W		The core of the church dates from the early 13th century, but most of it is from the first half of the following century. The church has a cruciform plan, with a west steeple. The steeple has a recessed spire supported by flying buttresses. Inside the church are stalls, with seven misericords from the 14th century. A recess in the south aisle contains a painting, also from the 14th century. There is some old stained glass in a window in the north aisle.
Holy Trinity	Eccleshall; 52.8598°N 2.2577°W		Most of the church dates from the 13th century, including the chancel, the arcades, the north vestry, and the lower part of the tower. The aisles were rebuilt in the 15th century, when the south porch was also added. The church was restored by G. E. Street in 1866–69. The piscina and the sedilia date from the 13th century, as does the font. The reredos of 1898 was designed by Basil Champneys. In the church are the tombs of four Bishops of Lichfield.
St Lawrence	Gnosall; 52.7853°N 2.2533°W		This was a collegiate church, and has a cruciform plan with a tower at the crossing. Its core dates from the 12th century, and the church contains Norman features, particularly around the crossing. The triforium in the south transept is also from this period. The church was refashioned during the following two centuries, and the south porch was added in 1892 by Charles Lynam. The monuments include an alabaster effigy of a knight from the 15th century.
St Michael and All Angels	Hamstall Ridware; 52.7717°N 1.8449°W		Norman material from the 12th century remains in the west wall of the nave, including part of a window. Most of the church dates from the 14th century, including the chancel, the north chapel, the south aisle, and the tower with its recessed spire. Dating from the 15th century are the Perpendicular north aisle and clerestory. Inside the church is a 14th-century piscina. The reredos contains painted panels from the 15th century. There are fragments of 14th-century stained glass in a south chapel window.
St Mary	High Offley; 52.8325°N 2.3228°W		The core of the church dates from the 12th century, and features from the 13th century are still present, including the lower stages of the tower and the south arcade. Most of the rest of the church is from the 15th and 16th centuries and is Perpendicular in style, including the nave, chancel, and upper part of the tower. There was a limited 19th-century restoration. which included the addition of a south porch. Inside the church, the nave roof is "an outstanding and well-preserved work of late-medieval carpentry", which includes bosses carved with heads and foliage.
Holy Angels	Hoar Cross; 52.8048°N 1.8163°W		Holy Angels Church was built between 1872 and 1876 to a design by G. F. Bodley. It was built to the memory of Hugo Francis Meynell Ingram of Hoar Cross Hall and Temple Newsham by his wife. The Lady Chapel was added in 1891, followed by another chapel in 1900, and the west narthex in 1906. Most of the furnishings were also designed by Bodley, and all the stained glass is by Burlison and Grylls.
Holy Cross	Ilam; 53.0533°N 1.8035°W		Holy Cross originates from the 11th century, and has a blocked Saxon doorway. It was partly rebuilt in the 13th century, a south chapel was added in 1618, and in 1831 an octagonal memorial chapel was built on the north side. The church was extensively restored in 1855–56 by George Gilbert Scott. It has a west tower with a saddleback roof. Many of the internal fittings and furnishings were designed by Scott, including the north arcade, the reredos, and screens. The font is Norman. Also in the church is the shrine of Saint Bertelin, a fragment of Saxon carved stone, and a monument dated 1831 by Chantrey.
St Mary	Ingestre; 52.8198°N 2.0361°W		Built in 1676 to replace an earlier building, the church was designed for Walter Chetwynd, 1st Viscount Chetwynd, possibly by Christopher Wren. It is in ashlar stone, with aisles and a west tower. The doorway is on the west side of the tower; it has Tuscan columns, and a pediment. The tower is surmounted by a balustrade and four urns. Inside the church, the arcades are carried on Doric columns. The monuments are all to the Chetwynd, Talbot, and Chetwynd-Talbot families.
All Saints	Kings Bromley; 52.7507°N 1.8206°W		Part of the south wall of the nave is Norman, containing a round-headed window. The chancel and north aisle date from the 14th century, and are in Decorated style. The west tower was built in the 16th century; this and the clerestory are Perpendicular. The north vestry, organ chamber, and south porch are from the 19th century. Inside the church, the pulpit is dated 1656, and the font 1664. The screen is unusual, its tracery including intertwined branches and human heads.
St Peter	Kinver; 52.4452°N 2.2278°W		The church dates mainly from the 14th century, incorporating material from an earlier church. It was extended during the 15th century, and restored in 1884–85 by George Gilbert Scott and John Oldrid Scott. The north aisle was rebuilt in 1976. Inside the church, the font dates from the 14th century, and the pulpit is dated 1625. The monuments date from the mid-15th century.
All Saints	Lapley; 52.7139°N 2.1903°W		All Saints stands on the site of a former Benedictine priory. Its dates from the 12th century, with Norman material in the lower part of the central tower, the nave and the chancel. The chancel was lengthened in the 13th century, and further alterations were made in the 15th century. The upper part of the tower and two nave windows are in Perpendicular style. Inside the church, on the north wall of the nave, is a fragment of a medieval painting.
All Saints	Leek; 53.1023°N 2.0239°W		Designed by Richard Norman Shaw, the church was built in 1885–87. It has a central tower with a pyramidal roof. Due to the slope of the land, the vestry is underneath the chancel. Inside the church, the walls of the chancel, and the east walls of the Lady Chapel, were painted by Gerald Horsley. The reredos was designed by William Lethaby. Most of the stained glass was made by Morris. Also in the church is work by the Leek School of Embroiderers.
Lichfield Cathedral	Lichfield; 52.6856°N 1.8305°W		Building of the cathedral began in the early 13th century, and continued through the 14th century. It was badly damaged in the Civil War, the spire collapsing in 1646. The building was restored between 1661 and 1669. Since then there have been a number of restorations, the architects involved including James Wyatt, Joseph Potter, George Gilbert Scott, and John Oldrid Scott. The cathedral has a cruciform plan, and three spires, two of them at the west end, and the other above the crossing.
All Saints	Madeley; 52.9962°N 2.3396°W		With the core of the church dating from the 12th century, its north arcade is Norman. The church was remodelled in the 14th and 15th centuries, and the tower was built in about 1400; it incorporates both Decorated and Perpendicular features. Charles Lynam carried out a restoration in 1872, rebuilding the chancel. The pulpit is Jacobean, and the monuments date from the early 16th century.
St Nicholas	Mavesyn Ridware; 52.7494°N 1.8805°W		The north aisle dates from the 14th century, and the tower from the 15th; both are constructed in sandstone. The body of the church was built in 1782, and is in brick. In the late 18th and early 19th centuries the aisle was converted into a chapel for the Mavesyn family. In this chapel are monuments to members of the family, and others, which include incised alabaster slabs on the walls, and tomb chests. There are also effigies of two knights dating from the 13th and 14th centuries respectively. The font is Norman.
St John the Baptist	Mayfield; 52.9999°N 1.7716°W		The church dates from the 12th century, it was remodelled and extended in the early 14th century, and the tower was added in 1515. The north aisle was rebuilt in 1854 by F. W. Fiddian. The south arcade and the south doorway are Norman. Much of the church is in Decorated style, and the west tower is Perpendicular. Inside the church, the pulpit is dated 1514, and benches are dated 1630 and 1633.
St Peter	Norbury; 52.8084°N 2.3184°W		The body of the church is constructed in sandstone, dates from the 14th century, and is mainly in Decorated style. The tower, built in 1759, is in brick, and in Georgian style. The church was restored in 1826–29, when the north vestry and west gallery were added. Inside the church are well-preserved medieval roofs, and a tomb recess containing an effigy dating from the 14th century.
St Michael and All Angels	Penkridge; 52.7251°N 2.1178°W		The church originated as a collegiate church in the 13th century. Additions and alterations were made in the 14th and the 16th centuries. The church was restored in 1881 by J .A. Chatwin. The font is dated 1668. The chancel screen is Dutch and has been moved here from Cape Town; it is dated 1778. In the church are memorials to members of the Littleton family.
St Mary	Rolleston on Dove; 52.8465°N 1.6515°W		The Norman material in this church, which originated in the 12th century, includes two doorways. The south porch was built in the late 13th century, and the west tower in about 1300. In 1892 the church was restored by Arthur Blomfield, at which time the spire was added. Some of the windows contain stained glass by C. E. Kempe. There are monuments to Robert Sherborne, Bishop of Chichester, who died in 1536, and to members of the Mosley family.
All Saints	Sandon; 52.8628°N 2.0697°W		All Saints dates originally from the late 12th or early 13th century, and was virtually rebuilt in about 1300. The north aisle was added during the 14th century. In 1851 the north aisle was remodelled to serve as the family chapel of the Earls of Harrowby. The church was restored in 1923 by W. D. Caroe. Inside the church is a font dated 1669. The pulpit with its tester, and family pews in the chancel, are Jacobean. The monuments include one to the antiquary Sampson Erdeswicke. who died in 1603 and designed it himself in 1601.
St Mary	Stafford; 52.8064°N 2.1181°W		St Mary's started as a collegiate church in the early 13th century, and the nave and aisles remain from that period. The chancel followed later in the century, with the north transept in the following century. The clerestories and octagonal tower at the crossing date from the 15th century. The tower formerly had a spire, but this fell in 1594. In 1841–44 the church was extensively restored by George Gilbert Scott, who rebuilt the south aisle of the chancel, the south transept, and the crossing. Inside the church is a font dating from about 1200, and monuments, the earliest dating from the 16th century.
All Saints	Standon; 52.9119°N 2.2698°W		The church originated in the 12th century, and most of the west wall and the nave are Norman, including the west doorway. The west tower dates from the 14th century. In 1846–47 the church was restored by George Gilbert Scott who probably rebuilt the chancel. Inside the church is a 12th-century font. In the vestry is an alabaster tablet to the memory of Sir Titus Salt.
St Mary	Swynnerton; 52.9168°N 2.2211°W		St Mary's dates from the 12th century, with the chancel rebuilt and the aisles added the following century. In the 14th century a south chapel was added, and the tower was built on the west end of the church. The tower contains two Norman doorways, the external one being re-set, and the internal door being original. There was an extensive 19th-century restoration when the clerestory was added. Inside the church is a large 13th-century statue of Christ, and a 14th-century effigy of a knight.
St Editha	Tamworth; 52.6342°N 1.6943°W		The church was founded in the 9th century, and has retained Saxon and Norman features in and around the former crossing. For some time it was a collegiate church. There was a fire in 1345, and most of the fabric is from the resulting rebuilding, and is Decorated in style. Restorations were carried out during the 19th century by Benjamin Ferrey, George Gilbert Scott and William Butterfield. The interior of the church is notable for its memorials, which date from the 14th century.
St Mary	Tutbury; 52.8590°N 1.6878°W		The church originated as part of Tutbury Priory, and dates from the 13tg century. The nave contains much Norman architecture, including the south and west doorways. The latter has seven orders, and is carved with beasts and figures; the outermost order is in alabaster, and is the earliest known use of this material in England. The tower was added probably in the 16th century, and the north aisle in 1829–22. The chancel with its apse was built in 1866 by G. E. Street, who also designed many of the internal fittings and furniture.
St Andrew	Weston-under-Lizard; 52.6932°N 2.2883°W		There is some remaining fabric from the 14th century, and some Norman stones in the south wall of the tower, but most of the church results from a rebuilding in 1700–01. The tower and nave were designed by Lady Elizabeth Wilbraham of the adjacent Weston Park. The chancel was added in 1876–77 by Ewan Christian, and the church was restored in 1869–70 by G. E. Street, who also designed the font. In the church are monuments to the Earls of Bradford and their families.
