= 1871 West Staffordshire by-election =

UK Parliamentary by-election

The 1871 West Staffordshire by-election was fought on 13 June 1871. The by-election was fought due to the death of the incumbent Conservative MP, Hugo Francis Meynell Ingram. It was won by the unopposed Conservative candidate Francis Monckton.
