= Child baronets =

Baronetcy in the Baronetage of the United Kingdom

There have been four baronetcies created for persons with the surname Child, two in the Baronetage of England and two in the Baronetage of the United Kingdom.

The Child Baronetcy, of Wanstead in the County of Essex, was created in the Baronetage of England on 16 July 1678. For more information on this creation, see Earl Tylney.

The Child Baronetcy, of the City of London, was created in the Baronetage of England on 4 February 1685 for the East India merchant and colonial administrator John Child. The title became extinct on the death of his grandson, the third Baronet, in 1753.

The Child Baronetcy, of Newfield and of Stallington in the county of Stafford, and of Dunlosset, Islay, the county of Argyll was created in the Baronetage of the United Kingdom on 7 December 1868 for the philanthropist and politician Smith Child. He sat as Member of Parliament for Staffordshire North and Staffordshire West. The second Baronet represented Stone in the House of Commons. On his death in 1958 the baronetcy became extinct.

The Child Baronetcy, of Bromley Place in Bromley in the County of Kent, was created in the Baronetage of the United Kingdom on 16 September 1919 for Coles Child. He was a Justice of the Peace and Deputy Lieutenant for Kent. His only son, the second Baronet, was a Major in the Coldstream Guards and served as a Deputy Lieutenant of Kent. His son, the third Baronet, was the actor Jeremy Child. As of 2022 the title is held by the latter's elder son, the fourth Baronet, who succeeded in March of that year.

== Child baronets, of Wanstead (1678) ==
- see Earl Tylney

== Child baronets, of the City of London (1685) ==
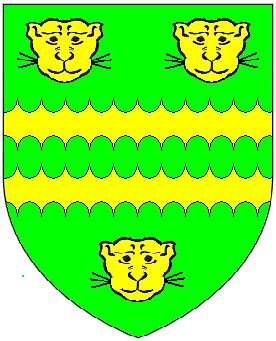
Arms of Child Baronets (of the City of London): Vert, two bars engrailed between three lion's faces or

- Sir John Child, 1st Baronet (died 1690)
- Sir Caesar Child, 2nd Baronet (c. 1678–1725)
- Sir Caesar Child, 3rd Baronet (1702–1753)

== Child baronets, of Newfield (1868) ==
Escutcheon of the Child baronets of Newfield

- Sir Smith Child, 1st Baronet (1808–1896)
- Sir Smith Hill Child, 2nd Baronet (1880–1958)

== Child baronets, of Bromley Place (1919) ==
- Sir Coles Child, 1st Baronet (1862–1929)
- Sir Coles John Child, 2nd Baronet (1906–1971)
- Sir Coles John Jeremy Child, 3rd Baronet (1944–2022)
- Sir Coles John Alexander Child, 4th Baronet (born 1982)

The only person currently in remainder to the baronetcy is the younger son of the 3rd Baronet, Patrick Greville Child (born 1991).
