= Listed buildings in Hoar Cross =

Hoar Cross is a civil parish in the district of East Staffordshire, Staffordshire, England. It contains six listed buildings that are recorded in the National Heritage List for England. Of these, one is listed at Grade I, the highest of the three grades, two are at Grade II*, the middle grade, and the others are at Grade II, the lowest grade. The parish contains the village of Hoar Cross and the surrounding countryside. The listed buildings consist of a country house and associated structures, a church, and a milepost.

== Key ==
Grade	Criteria
I	Buildings of exceptional interest, sometimes considered to be internationally important
II*	Particularly important buildings of more than special interest
II	Buildings of national importance and special interest

== Buildings ==
Name and location	Photograph	Date	Notes	Grade
Gatepiers and seats, Hoar Cross Hall; 52.80486°N 1.81829°W	—	c. 1600	The gate piers and seats were moved to their present site in the terrace garden in about 1870. The pair of large piers are square, in stone, and have a moulded entablature and each is surmounted by four ball finials and a pyramidal cap. The seats are attached to the south side and have scrolled arms.	II*
Gatepiers and gates, Hoar Cross Hall; 52.80448°N 1.81831°W	—	c. 1700	The gate piers and gates were moved to their present site at the south boundary of the terrace garden in about 1870. The pair of piers are square, in stone, and have bracketed pilasters, a moulded entablature with a pulvinated frieze, and a ball finial on a raised square base. Between the piers is a pair of elaborately decorated wrought iron gates.	II*
Hoar Cross Hall; 52.80552°N 1.81828°W		1862–71	A country house, later a hotel, it was designed by Henry Clutton in Jacobean style, and is in red brick with a slate roof. There are two storeys and attics, and a garden front of seven bays. This front has three two-storey canted bay windows, three gables, an open balustrade, and mullioned and transomed windows. On the entrance front are two square towers with ogee caps, a projecting porte-cochère to the right, and a chapel projecting to the left. The chapel was decorated in Gothic style by G. F. Bodley.	II
Church of Holy Angels; 52.80490°N 1.81620°W		1872–76	The church was designed by G. F. Bodley in Decorated style, the Lady chapel was added to the north in 1891, the south chapel in 1900, and the west narthex in 1906. The church is built in stone, and consists of a nave, north and south transepts, a north porch, a chancel with north and south chapels, and a central tower. The tower has two tiers of panels, a clock face, and an embattled parapet.	I
Milepost at N.G.R. SK 11482460; 52.81892°N 1.83076°W		Mid to late 19th century	The milepost is on the south side of the B5234 road. It is in cast iron and has a triangular section and a chamfered top. The milepost is inscribed on the top with "ABBOTS BROMLEY", and on the lower faces with the distances in miles to Abbots Bromley, Newborough and Burton.	II
Gateway and lodge, Hoar Cross Hall; 52.80675°N 1.81637°W		Late 19th century	The gateway and lodge are in red brick with stone dressings and a tile roof. The gateway has a segmental arch, a postern to the right, and an embattled parapet. Both parts of the lodge are gabled, and have quoins, mullioned and transomed windows in the ground floor and mullioned windows above. The left part has one storey and one bay and contains a square bay window, and the part to the right has two storeys, two bays, and a two-storey bay window.	II
