= Sir Smith Child, 2nd Baronet =

British Army general (1880–1958)

Brigadier-General Sir Smith Child Bt GCVO CB CMG DSO DL
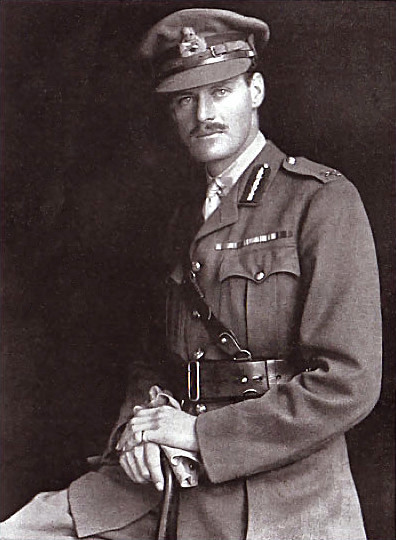
- Child in 1918
- Born: 19 September 1880; Hopesay, Shropshire, England
- Died: 11 November 1958 (aged 78); Shrewsbury, Shropshire, England
- Burial place: Westbury, Shropshire, England
- Military career
- Allegiance: United Kingdom
- Branch: British Army
- Service years: 1899–1924
- Rank: Brigadier-General
- Units: Royal Scots; Irish Guards; Royal Field Artillery
- Commands: II North Midland Brigade, Royal Field Artillery; 46th (North Midland) Divisional Artillery
- Conflicts: Second Boer War; First World War
- Awards: Knight Grand Cross of the Royal Victorian Order; Companion of the Order of the Bath; Companion of the Order of St Michael and St George; Distinguished Service Order; Mentioned in Despatches; Croix de Guerre (France)

Brigadier-General Sir Smith Hill Child, 2nd Baronet, GCVO, CB, CMG, DSO, DL (19 September 1880 – 11 November 1958) was an officer in the British Army and a Conservative Party politician.

== Early life and education ==
Hill Child was educated at Eton College and Christ Church, Oxford. He succeeded his grandfather, Sir Smith Child, 1st Baronet, as 2nd Baronet of Newfield Hall, near Tunstall, Staffordshire, in 1896.

== Military career ==
Hill Child was commissioned as a second lieutenant in the part-time 3rd (Edinburgh Light Infantry Militia) Battalion, Royal Scots, on 25 October 1899. The battalion was embodied for full-time service in the Second Boer War on 5 December that year, and in early March 1900 left Queenstown on the SS Oriental for South Africa. They landed at East London on 21 March 1900 and by July was engaged in operations against Boer Commandos in the Transvaal. Hill Child was wounded, and returned to the United Kingdom during Christmas 1900. He was promoted to lieutenant in the militia battalion on 6 March 1901, but in July was commissioned into the Regular Army as a second lieutenant in the newly raised Irish Guards. Promotion to lieutenant in the regiment came on 1 March 1902, and he was chosen to carry the colours at the first presentation of Colours to the Regiment on 30 May 1902, following which he was appointed a Member of the Royal Victorian Order (MVO). He retired from Regular service in 1909 and was placed on the Reserve of Officers in 1910.

On 8 February 1910, Hill Child was promoted to lieutenant-colonel in the part-time Territorial Force and was appointed commanding officer of the II North Midland Brigade in the Royal Field Artillery. He was in command when the brigade was mobilised as part of the 46th (North Midland) Division in the First World War and served with it on the Western Front. The brigade was later numbered CCXXXI (231). 46th Division saw its first major action at the Battle of the Hohenzollern Redoubt in October 1915. Hill Child was awarded the Distinguished Service Order in 1916.

At the Battle of Gommecourt on 1 July 1916, organised as a diversion from the main Battle of the Somme, the divisional artillery was allocated the task of wire-cutting: CCXXXI and another brigade formed the Left group, under the command of Hill Child. This group supported two battalions (1/5th and 1/7th (Robin Hoods)) of the Sherwood Foresters, but the German wire entanglements were in dead ground and could not be seen by artillery observers. The attack was a costly failure, and Hill Child was a member of the court of inquiry into the circumstances.

On 13 March 1918 the Commander, Royal Artillery (CRA) of the 46th Division was wounded, and Hill Child was appointed to act in his place. A week later he was promoted to the temporary rank of brigadier general and confirmed as CRA.

The 46th Division had been very unlucky during the war, the infantry in particular sustaining heavy casualties at the Hohenzollern Redoubt and Gommecourt, but it gained revenge at the Battle of the St Quentin Canal on 29 September 1918 when it crossed the canal and broke open the Hindenburg Line. Careful artillery preparation and support was an integral part of this success. Hill Child had nine brigades of field artillery under his command. The bombardment began on the night of 26/27 September with harassing fire and gas shells, followed with intense bombardment with high explosive shells until the morning of the assault. Every field gun was used in carefully timed barrages: 'creeping barrages' (including smoke shells) ahead of the attacking troops, with pauses at the end of each phase, including a 'standing barrage' of three hours to allow mopping-up of the first objectives to be carried out, and the second wave of troops to pass through and renew the attack behind the creeping barrage. The first of these creeping barrages actually progressed at twice the normal pace while the infantry rushed downhill to seize the canal crossings; it was described in the Official History as 'one of the finest ever seen'.

The attack was a success, and by the afternoon the field artillery batteries were crossing the canal by the bridges that had been captured or thrown across, and were coming into action on the far side. The 46th Division was prominent in the pursuit of the Germans leading to the Armistice in November 1918.

During the war Hill Child was Mentioned in Despatches, awarded the French Croix de Guerre, appointed a Companion of the Order of St Michael and St George and, in 1919, a Companion of the Order of the Bath. He continued in the Territorial Army after the war as CRA of 46th (North Midland) Division from 1920 to 1924, after which he was placed in the Regular Army Reserve of Officers.

== Political career ==
Hill Child was elected at the 1918 general election as Coalition Conservative Member of Parliament (MP) for Stone in Staffordshire, and held the seat until he stood down at the 1922 general election.

Hill Child was also Deputy Lieutenant and Justice of the Peace for the county of Staffordshire between 1912 and 1949, with an interval between 1938 and 1941, as well as for the counties of London and Berkshire from 1936 until he retired from full-time royal service.

== Royal Household career ==
Child was appointed in 1927 Gentleman Usher in Ordinary in the Royal Household by King George V and promoted Deputy Master of the Household in 1929. He became Master in the "year of three kings", 1936, serving King George VI until he retired from the post in 1941, but remained from 1937 Extra-Equerry to the King and, from 1952, his successor Elizabeth II.

Hill Child was appointed a Knight Grand Cross of the Royal Victorian Order for his personal services to the Monarch and the Royal Household in 1941, having been previously appointed Commander of the Royal Victorian Order in 1934 and Knight Commander of the Royal Victorian Order in 1937. He also received a number of foreign honours during his service, including:

Grand Commander, Order of St Olav of Norway.
Commander of the Legion of Honour of France.
Commander of the Order of the Crown of Belgium.
Commander of the Order of the Crown of Romania.
Commander of the Order of the Two Rivers of Iraq.

He inherited the baronetcy on the death of his grandfather, who had also been a Conservative MP. The title became extinct on his death in 1958, aged 78. He had made his last home at Whitton Hall in Shropshire by 1948 and was buried in the parish churchyard at nearby Westbury.

== Notes ==
Parliament of the United Kingdom
| New constituency | Member of Parliament for Stone; 1918–1922 | Succeeded by Joseph Lamb |
Baronetage of the United Kingdom
| Preceded by Smith Child | Baronet (of Newfield); 1896–1958 | Extinct |
Honorary titles
| Preceded by Lord Claud Nigel Hamilton | Deputy Master of the Household; 1929–1936 | Succeeded by Ririd Myddleton |
| Preceded by Derek Keppel | Master of the Household; 1936–1941 | Succeeded by Sir Piers Legh |
