= Moreton House, Hampstead =

Coordinates: 51°33′26″N 0°10′51″W

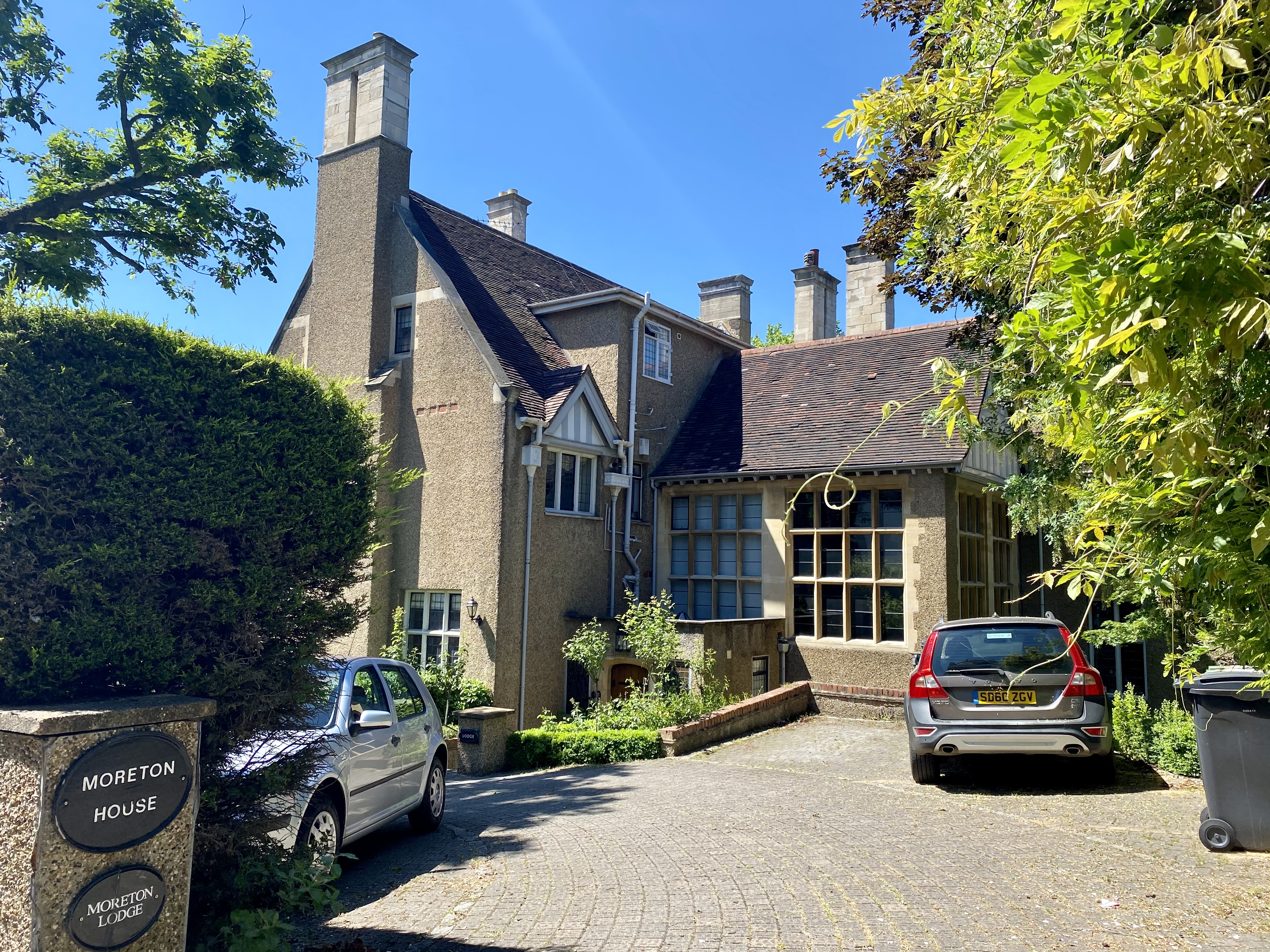
Moreton House in June 2021

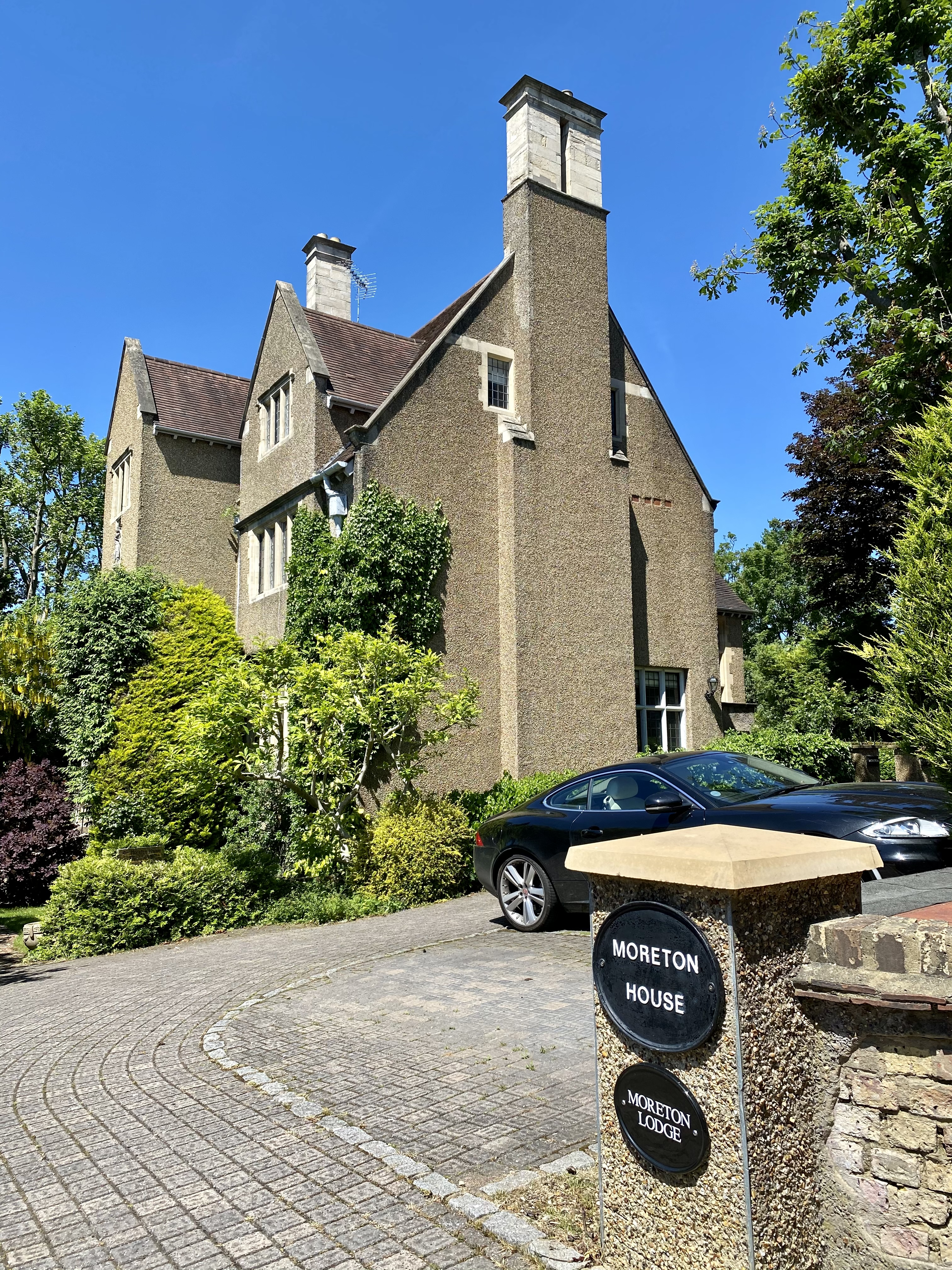

Moreton House is a detached house on Holly Walk in Hampstead in the London Borough of Camden. It has been listed Grade II on the National Heritage List for England (NHLE) since December 1969.

It was designed by the architect Thomas Garner for F.E. Sidney, an art historian and collector in 1894 and completed in 1896. The house is set over three storeys with distinctive tall chimney stacks with its architectural style described as "Cotswold vernacular Jacobean" by the NHLE listing and as a 'Jacobean manor house' by Nikolaus Pevsner. The central bay of the house projects forward to form a porch with a round arched entrance, a sculptured heraldic tablet is sited above the porch. A sculpture of the Virgin and child sits as an aedicule above the window on the first floor. '1896' is inscribed on the head of the drainpipes of the house.

The house originally had extensive terraced gardens, these were subsequently built on in the 20th century. The London: North edition of the Pevsner Architectural Guides described the houses built on the former grounds of Moreton House as "mediocre". A series of photos of the gardens when first laid out were taken by the architect Michael Bunney and the prints form part of the Bunney Collection in the Historic England Archive in Swindon.

The house was featured in House and Garden magazine in 1905.
