= Emily Meynell-Ingram =

British artist (1840–1904)

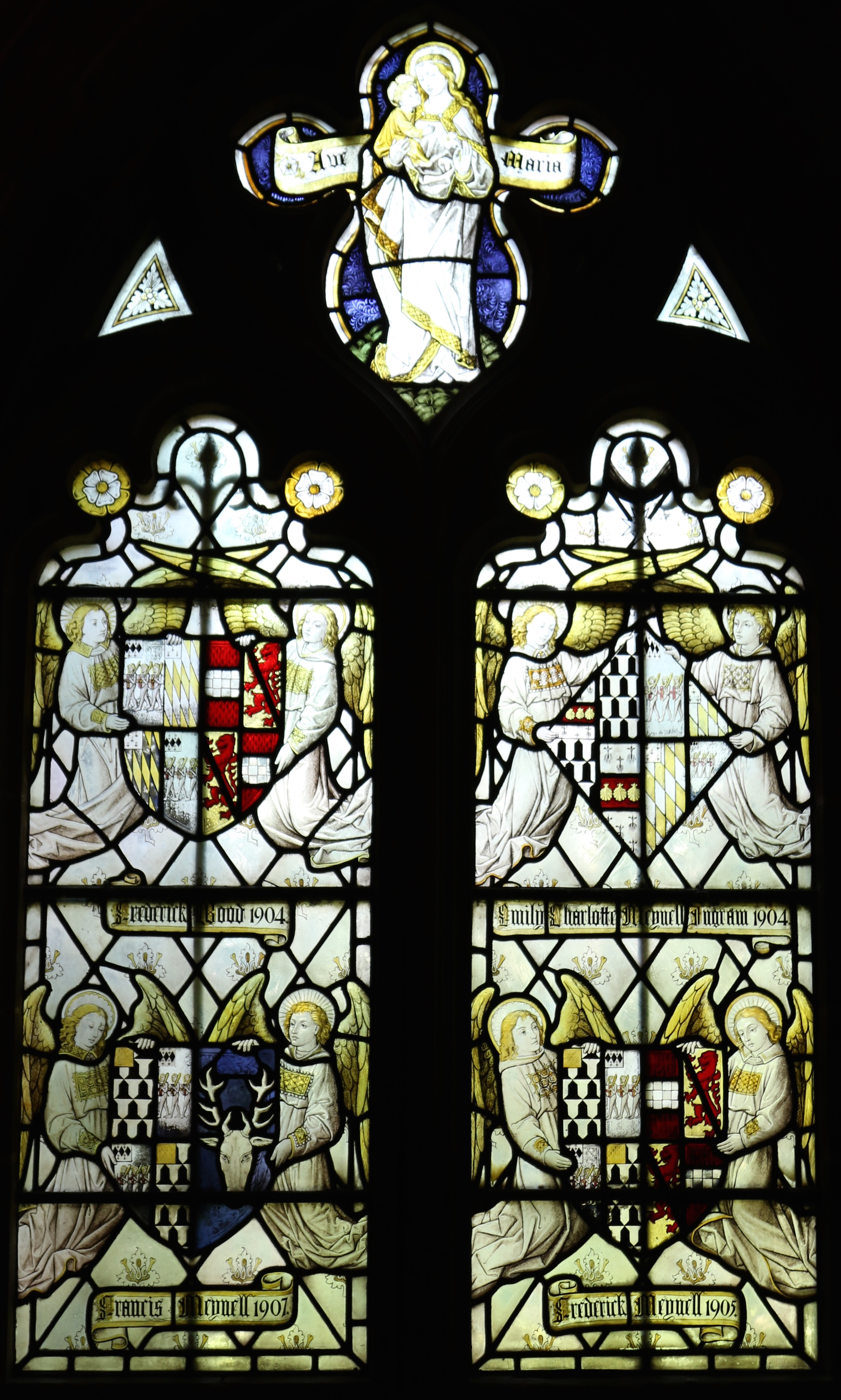
Memorial window to the Meynell Ingram family members in the Church of the Holy Angels, Hoar Cross

Emily Charlotte Meynell Ingram (1840–1904) was a British artist, traveller and the last resident of Temple Newsam House, Leeds. She was the daughter of Charles Wood, 1st Viscount Halifax.

== Early life ==
Born Emily Charlotte Wood, she was the second eldest of six children born to Sir Charles Woods and Lady Mary Woods (formally known as Grey). The Woods family were an old gentry family who were respectable York merchants. They reached this level of respectability through the discovery of coal on their ancestral estate, the great Barnsley field, which helped to supply some of Britain's richest and finest coal. In addition to this, Sir Charles Woods had a successful political career, owning many seats in Garrowby and Pocklington near York; Hickleton near Doncaster and a home in London in Belgrave Square. She spent her childhood between Hickleton and London. In her diaries, she described herself as a "joyous and headstrong spirit". According to J.G Lockhart, her brother's colleague and biographer, described as being clever, capable, but spoilt by her father, making it hard for her to interact with strangers as she could be difficult and dictatorial. She was largely involved in her father's political career

As a child, she would often visit Buckingham Palace. She was friends with Princess Victoria, Helena and Louise, often visiting them to play together. She was particularly close to her older brother Charles, whom she would later rely on after the passing of her husband in 1871.

== Marriage and Temple Newsam ==
In 1864, she married Hugo Meynell-Ingram, who was the last surviving descendant of Sir Arthur Ingram. He was eighteen years older than her, and they met through a mutual friend (Lady Harcourt) whilst Emily was visiting Chiswick. They came from politically very different houses: the Woods were Whigs, whereas the Meynell-Ingrams were Tories. Once Emily and Hugo were married, they spent most of their married lives at Hoar Cross in Staffordshire, using Temple Newsam as a place to stay when they went hunting. Hoar Cross was specifically built for the married couple by Henry Clutton in 1862.

When her husband died in 1871 from a hunting accident, she became a widow and childless at the age of 31 after 8 years of marriage. She was devastated by her husband's death, and to commemorate his memory, she built a church near Hoar Cross Hall. Known as Hoar Cross Holy Angels Church. She inherited all of the Meynell Ingram properties and wealth. After losing her husband, she came to rely on her family, with her younger brother (Fredrick) and his wife (Mary), who moved into Temple Newsam with her. In addition to this, she found great comfort in her Anglo-Catholic faith, spending time and money building new churches in memory of her husband and investing in charitable institutions. During this period of mourning, Emily Ingram devoted her time to renovating and improving Temple Newsam. She particularly spent time improving the Jacobean features of the house. Between 1877 and 1900, the Library became a Chapel; she Jacobeanised the Great Hall, adding a grand oak staircase.

Emily was an ardent lover of art and a practising artist. In her prime, she was an accomplished sketcher and watercolourist, with most of her work being passed down through the Meynell-Ingram descendants. She had acquired a large collection primarily from the 17th century. Coincidentally, prior to owning the collection, in a letter to her brother on 5 June 1860, she wrote about her love of 17th-century art and how she hoped to own some paintings of her own from the period. Due to the values of the time and her religious beliefs, any pieces in her collection that were thought to be distasteful or erotic were either disposed of or cleaned up, concealing any offensive elements.

In addition to all the estates and wealth Emily inherited from her marriage, she became the owner of a 360-ton schooner (yacht) with a full-time crew of over thirty people. She would take the yacht sailing for a few weeks every year, usually travelling through Europe and the Mediterranean, with a party of friends and family to escape the formalities and restrictions of everyday life. She would often bring back artefacts from her travels for her home or churches.

Through her inheritance, charity work and renovations, Emily Ingram became one of the richest and most independent women in the country. Often throwing lavish dinners and shooting parties. One highlight of her social career was hosting King George V and Queen Mary in 1894 on their official visit to Leeds.

Emily Charlotte Meynell-Ingram died in 1904 at Temple Newsam House. Her funeral was held at Hoar Cross Hall, and she was buried next to her husband at Hoar Cross Holy Angels Church. Since she and Hugo did not have any children, the Meynell-Ingram estates and wealth were passed down to her nephew.

Today, Temple Newsam House is maintained by Leeds City Council under Leeds Museums and Galleries. Hoar Cross Hall is now a spa resort, with parts of the grounds being used as a car park.

== Religion and Buildings ==
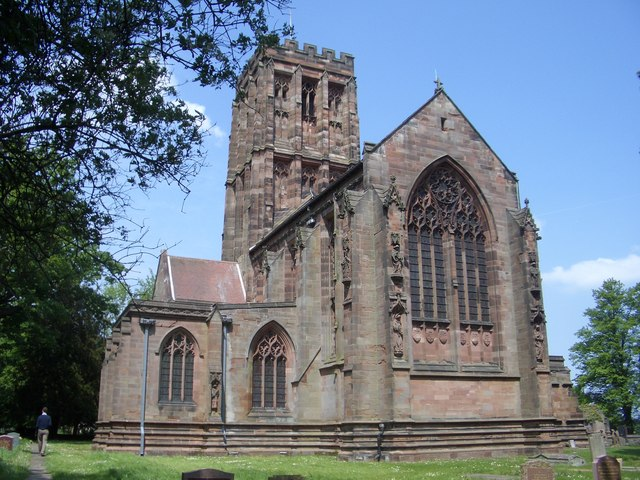
Church of the Holy Angels, Hoar Cross

Emily Ingram was a well-known and prominent Anglo-catholic; her family were heavily involved in the Anglo-catholic religion and church. Her Brother Charles Lindley Wood was the president of the English Church Union from 1868 to 1919. Between 1872 and 1876, Emily Ingram had the Hoar Cross church of Holy Angels built in remembrance of her husband. Within the church, there is a chapel containing two marble effigies; one of Hugo Meynell-Ingram and the other of Emily Meynell Ingram lying next to each other. She hired the architect George Fredrick Bodley to build the church and was in charge of the furnishing within it. The church is decorated with marble flooring, reredos, screens and a front cover. Emily also added several souvenirs from her travels. She also commissioned the buildings of the churches St Edwards in Holbeck (Leeds) and Altofts using her own expenses. Additionally, she was involved in the restoration of churches in Laughton.

Being a devoted Anglo-Catholic, she would hold services on her yacht, the Ariadne. In addition to the many churches Emily Ingram built or renovated, she built a church home for boys near Hoar Cross. In 1963, a magazine called Our Waifs and Strays reported that some of the boys had seen sightings of a friendly and useful ally thought to be Emily Ingram's ghost. The home was later closed in 1983.

== See also ==
- Hugo Meynell-Ingram
- Temple Newsam
