= Hoar Cross =

Village and civil parish in England

Coordinates: 52.790°N 1.800°W

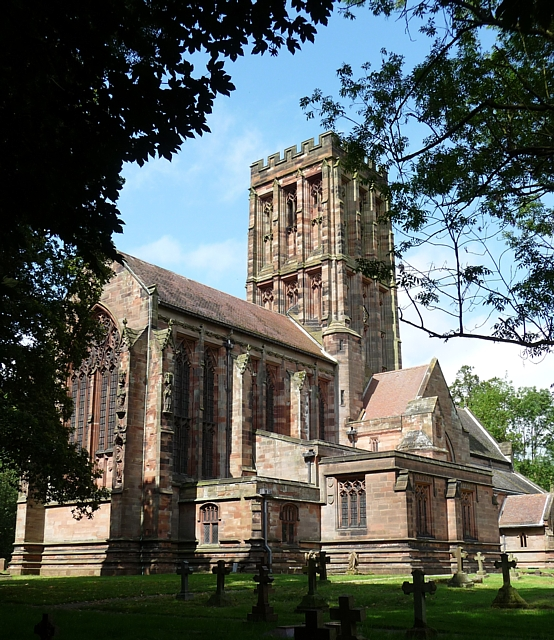
- Holy Angels' Church, Hoar Cross

- Location within Staffordshire
- Population: 250 (2011)
- OS grid reference: SK132232
- District: East Staffordshire
- Shire county: Staffordshire
- Region: West Midlands
- Country: England
- Sovereign state: United Kingdom
- Post town: BURTON-ON-TRENT
- Postcode district: DE13
- Dialling code: 01283
- Police: Staffordshire
- Fire: Staffordshire
- Ambulance: West Midlands
- UK Parliament: Lichfield

Hoar Cross is a small village and civil parish in the Borough of East Staffordshire, situated approximately 7 miles (11 km) west of Burton upon Trent.

== History ==
Hoarcross, as it was then called, was enclosed like the nearby Chartley Park from Needwood Forest. Unlike Chartley Park, Hoarcross survived without significant development. Today it is surrounded by agricultural land, still nestled in the hills of the ancient Needwood Forest (now part of the National Forest) but now become a notably affluent part of the East Staffordshire borough.

The eight extensive ornate partitioned gardens of Hoar Cross Hall once rivalled those of nearby Trentham, and maintained an extensive staff of gardeners in the early decades of the 20th century. Today this 19th century mansion is a hotel and health spa, situated 1/2-mile (0.80 km) to the west of Hoar Cross village.

== The Church ==
The Anglican parish church of Hoar Cross is Holy Angels' Church, in the Diocese of Lichfield. It was built by the pious Anglo-Catholic, Emily Charlotte Meynall-Ingram (sister of Charles Wood, 2nd Viscount Halifax) as a memorial to her late husband Hugo Francis Meynell Ingram. The church - an extremely elaborate edifice - was designed by George Frederick Bodley and Thomas Garner. One of its more famous features is a highly elaborate set of Stations of the Cross. Since 2008, it has received AEO from the Bishop of Ebbsfleet, and from 2023, from the Bishop of Oswestry.

== See also ==
- Listed buildings in Hoar Cross
