= West Staffordshire =

Parliamentary constituency in the United Kingdom, 1885–1918

- Former county constituency for the House of Commons
- County: Staffordshire

1868–1885
- Seats: Two
- Created from: South Staffordshire; North Staffordshire
- Replaced by: Lichfield Division, North-Western Division (both created of part only in 1885) Wolverhampton West, Stafford, Cannock (remainder)

1885–1918
- Seats: One
- Type of constituency: County constituency

West Staffordshire was a parliamentary constituency in Staffordshire which returned two Members of Parliament (MPs) to the House of Commons of the UK Parliament until 1885, and then one member until 1918.

== History ==
The constituency was created for the 1868 general election, and abolished for the 1918 general election.

== Boundaries ==
1868–1885: The Hundreds of Pirehill South, Cuttlestone and Seisdon (excluding the parish of Rushall), and the Townships of Willenhall and Wednesfield.

1885–1918: The sessional divisions of Penkridge (except the parishes of Great Wyrley and Norton Canes), Stafford (including the whole of the parish of Gnosall), and Stone, and the Municipal Borough of Stafford.

== Members of Parliament ==
=== MPs 1868–1885 ===
Election	1st Member	1st Party	2nd Member	2nd Party
1868	Sir Smith Child, Bt.	Conservative	Hugo Meynell-Ingram	Conservative
1871	Sir Smith Child, Bt.	Conservative	Francis Monckton	Conservative
1874	Alexander Staveley Hill	Conservative	Francis Monckton	Conservative
1885	representation reduced to one member			

=== MPs 1885–1918 ===
Election	Member	Party
1885	Hamar Bass	Liberal
1886	Hamar Bass	Liberal Unionist
1898 by-election	Sir Alexander Henderson	Liberal Unionist
1906	Henry McLaren	Liberal
1910	George Lloyd	Liberal Unionist
1912	George Lloyd	Conservative
1918	constituency abolished	

== Elections ==
=== Elections in the 1860s ===
General election 1868: West Staffordshire (2 seats)
Party	Candidate	Votes	%	±%
Conservative	Smith Child	3,909	27.5	
Conservative	Hugo Meynell-Ingram	3,773	26.5	
Liberal	William Orme Foster	3,295	23.2	
Liberal	Henry Hodgetts-Foley	3,244	22.8	
Majority		478	3.3	
Turnout		7,111 (est)	71.5 (est)	
Registered electors		9,942		
Conservative win (new seat)				
Conservative win (new seat)				

=== Elections in the 1870s ===
Ingram's death caused a by-election.

By-election, 13 Jun 1871: West Staffordshire (1 seat)
Party	Candidate	Votes	%	±%
Conservative	Francis Monckton	Unopposed		
Conservative hold				

General election 1874: West Staffordshire (2 seats)
Party	Candidate	Votes	%	±%
Conservative	Alexander Staveley Hill	Unopposed		
Conservative	Francis Monckton	Unopposed		
Registered electors		10,365		
Conservative hold				
Conservative hold				

=== Elections in the 1880s ===
General election 1880: West Staffordshire (2 seats)
Party	Candidate	Votes	%	±%
Conservative	Alexander Staveley Hill	4,123	27.5	N/A
Conservative	Francis Monckton	3,967	26.5	N/A
Liberal	William Anson	3,564	23.8	New
Liberal	James Hall Renton	3,344	22.3	New
Majority		403	2.7	N/A
Turnout		7,499 (est)	66.4 (est)	N/A
Registered electors		11,288		
Conservative hold		Swing	N/A	
Conservative hold		Swing	N/A	

General election 1885: West Staffordshire
Party	Candidate	Votes	%	±%
Liberal	Hamar Bass	4,820	54.0	+7.9
Conservative	Francis Monckton	4,106	46.0	−8.0
Majority		714	8.0	N/A
Turnout		8,926	83.9	+17.5 (est)
Registered electors		10,636		
Liberal gain from Conservative		Swing	+8.0	

General election 1886: West Staffordshire
Party	Candidate	Votes	%	±%
Liberal Unionist	Hamar Bass	Unopposed		
Liberal Unionist gain from Liberal				

=== Elections in the 1890s ===
General election 1892: West Staffordshire
Party	Candidate	Votes	%	±%
Liberal Unionist	Hamar Bass	5,227	64.5	N/A
Liberal	John Kempster	2,879	35.5	New
Majority		2,348	29.0	N/A
Turnout		8,106	78.0	N/A
Registered electors		10,395		
Liberal Unionist hold		Swing	N/A	

General election 1895: West Staffordshire
Party	Candidate	Votes	%	±%
Liberal Unionist	Hamar Bass	Unopposed		
Liberal Unionist hold				

Bass's death caused a by-election.

1898 West Staffordshire by-election
Party	Candidate	Votes	%	±%
Liberal Unionist	Alexander Henderson	4,769	54.4	N/A
Liberal	William Adams	3,993	45.6	New
Majority		776	8.8	N/A
Turnout		8,762	82.8	N/A
Registered electors		10,580		
Liberal Unionist hold		Swing	N/A	

=== Elections in the 1900s ===
General election 1900: West Staffordshire
Party	Candidate	Votes	%	±%
Liberal Unionist	Alexander Henderson	Unopposed		
Liberal Unionist hold				

General election 1906: West Staffordshire
Party	Candidate	Votes	%	±%
Liberal	Henry McLaren	5,586	54.3	New
Liberal Unionist	Alexander Henderson	4,708	45.7	N/A
Majority		878	8.6	N/A
Turnout		10,294	88.9	N/A
Registered electors		11,584		
Liberal gain from Liberal Unionist		Swing	N/A	

=== Elections in the 1910s ===
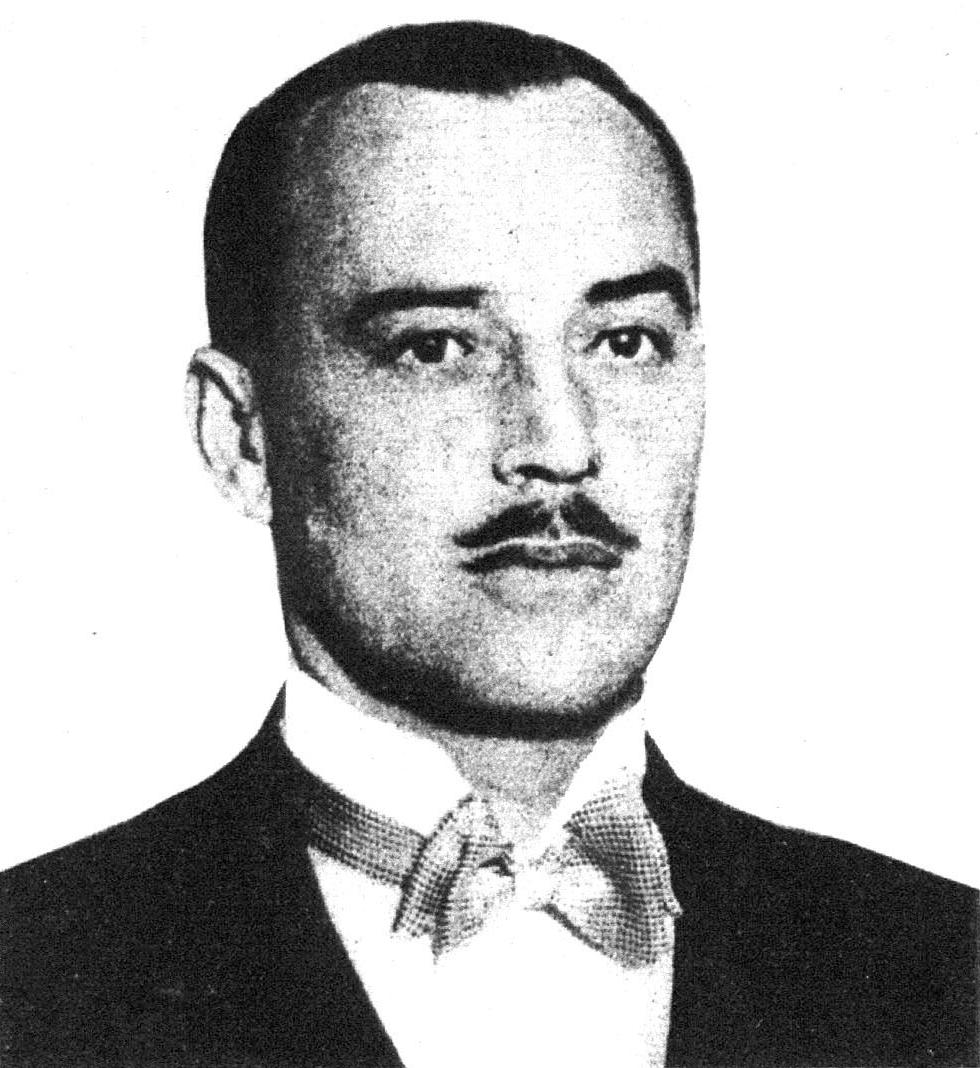
George Lloyd

General election January 1910: West Staffordshire
Party	Candidate	Votes	%	±%
Liberal Unionist	George Lloyd	5,892	52.5	+6.8
Liberal	Henry McLaren	5,327	47.5	−6.8
Majority		565	5.0	N/A
Turnout		11,219	92.0	+3.1
Registered electors		12,197		
Liberal Unionist gain from Liberal		Swing	+6.8	

General election December 1910: West Staffordshire
Party	Candidate	Votes	%	±%
Liberal Unionist	George Lloyd	5,602	52.2	−0.3
Liberal	Walter Meakin	5,123	47.8	+0.3
Majority		479	4.4	−0.6
Turnout		10,725	87.9	−4.1
Registered electors		12,197		
Liberal Unionist hold		Swing	−0.3	

General Election 1914–15:

Another General Election was required to take place before the end of 1915. The political parties had been making preparations for an election to take place and by July 1914, the following candidates had been selected;

- Unionist: Philip Ashworth
- Liberal: Beddoe Rees

== Sources ==
- Leigh Rayment's Historical List of MPs – Constituencies beginning with "S" (part 4)
