= Thomas Garner =

English Gothic revival architect

- Born: 1839; Wasperton Hill, Warwickshire, England
- Died: 30 April 1906 (aged 66–67); Fritwell Manor, Oxfordshire, England (buried Downside Abbey)
- Occupation: Architect
- Practice: Bodley and Garner
- Buildings: Downside Abbey choir
- Projects: Watts & Co.

Thomas Garner (1839 – 30 April 1906) was one of the leading English Gothic Revival architects of the Victorian era. He is known for his almost 30-year partnership with the architect George Frederick Bodley.

== Early life ==
Born at Wasperton Hill Farm in Warwickshire, Thomas Garner grew up in a rural setting that gave him an instinctive feeling for country crafts and construction, which were never weakened by long years spent in London.

== Career ==
Thomas Garner was articled to the architect Sir Gilbert Scott at the age of 17. One of his immediate predecessors at "Scott's" was George Frederick Bodley, who was already beginning to establish his own reputation. A warm friendship developed between two. When he returned to Warwickshire, Garner undertook various small works as a representative of Scott, including the repair of the old chapel of the Lord Leycester Hospital in Warwick, which he buttressed into security.

Garner married Rose Emily Smith on 6 October 1866. In 1868 he returned to London to help his friend Bodley, and they established a long and fruitful partnership at their office at 7 Gray's Inn Square. Garner lived at No. 20 Church Row in Hampstead from 1867 to 1893.

At first, their collaboration was close and produced such homogeneous work that there was little external evidence of dual authorship. In some of their earlier buildings, it is noticeable that the French influences previously evident in Bodley's work have been replaced by a distinctively English style. This period of close collaboration produced the Church of Saint John the Baptist at Tuebrook, Liverpool, soon followed and eclipsed by the Holy Angels at Hoar Cross, Staffordshire, and St Augustine's Church, Pendlebury, near Manchester – the former begun in 1871, the latter in 1873. They also designed St David's Cathedral, Hobart, in Tasmania.

As Bodley and Garner's commissions increased they became less exclusively ecclesiastical. Church building remained predominant but their practice widened to collegiate buildings in Oxford and Cambridge, and to private houses and offices. This broadening of scope reduced their actual collaboration.

Bodley and Garner's pupils included the garden designer Inigo Thomas who specialised in formal gardens with geometrical plans in 17th and 18th century styles, which suited the numerous houses that Bodley and Garner renovated for wealthy clients.

The ensuing period of dual practice under partnership left most of the secular opportunities to the control of the junior partner, Garner, while Bodley, with his penchant for Gothic forms and ecclesiastical work, devoted himself to church building and decoration. Garner was almost exclusively responsible for the design and supervision of most of the work at Oxford, including the alterations and tower at Christ Church, St Swithin's Quadrangle and the High Street Entrance Gate at Magdalen College, and the Master's Lodgings at University College. He was entirely responsible for the subsequent President's Lodgings at Magdalen College. Garner also designed River House in Tite Street, Chelsea, and the new classroom building at Marlborough College. Hewell Grange, Lord Windsor's Worcestershire mansion, with all its elaborate details, terraced gardens and their architectural accessories, was also his work.

Garner continued to contribute to the firm's ecclesiastical work. He designed the altar screen in St Paul's Cathedral and several sepulchral monuments, including those of the Bishops of Ely, Lincoln, Winchester and Chichester, and that of Henry Parry Liddon. In 1889 he designed the decorated gothic case for the organ at Church of the Holy Trinity, Stratford-upon-Avon.

Despite Bodley's distaste for business and trade, he and Garner also set up a fabric company with George Gilbert Scott Jr. in 1874, to provide embroidered and textile goods, wallpaper and stained glass. The firm was called Watts & Co., trading initially from Baker Street in London, and still continuing its traditions from premises near Westminster Cathedral. The name derives from Bodley's distaste for trade. When the founders were asked: "Who was Watts?" Bodley replied: "What's in a Name".

The final period of the Bodley and Garner partnership is best seen in St John the Evangelist Church, Oxford, built for the Cowley Fathers in 1894–96.

In 1898 Garner was received into the Roman Catholic Church, and his partnership with Bodley was dissolved for fear that this might harm the latter's business. After dissolving the partnership, Garner designed and supervised the restoration of Yarnton Manor, Oxfordshire in 1897; the Slipper Chapel at Houghton Saint Giles; Moreton House, Hampstead; and the Empire Hotel at Buxton by the Duke of Devonshire's estate. The crowning work of his life was the choir of Downside Abbey, near Bath, where his body lies.

He finally returned to the countryside for his final home, Fritwell Manor in Oxfordshire, the Jacobean house that he restored in 1893 and where he died in 1906. His interest in conservation was fostered throughout his life by his study of history, fine arts and literature. He and Stratton wrote The Domestic Architecture of England during the Tudor Period, which B. T. Batsford published in 1911.

== Sources ==
- Anson, Peter Frederick (1965) [1960]. Fashions in Church Furnishings 1840–1940. London: Studio Vista Ltd.
- Connor, Rev. Geoffery (2002). Parish Church of St. John the Baptist, Epping.
- Curl, James Stevens (2000). Oxford Dictionary of Architecture. Oxford: Oxford Paperbacks. ISBN 0-19-280017-5.
- Sherwood, Jennifer; Pevsner, Nikolaus (1974). Oxfordshire. The Buildings of England. Harmondsworth: Penguin Books. ISBN 0-14-071045-0.
- Collins, David Mark (1992) The Architecture of George Frederick Bodley 1827–1907 and Thomas Garner 1839–1906 Peterhouse, Cambridge University
