= Hoar Cross Hall =

Coordinates: 52.8054°N 1.8183°W

- Hoar Cross Hall Spa Hotel

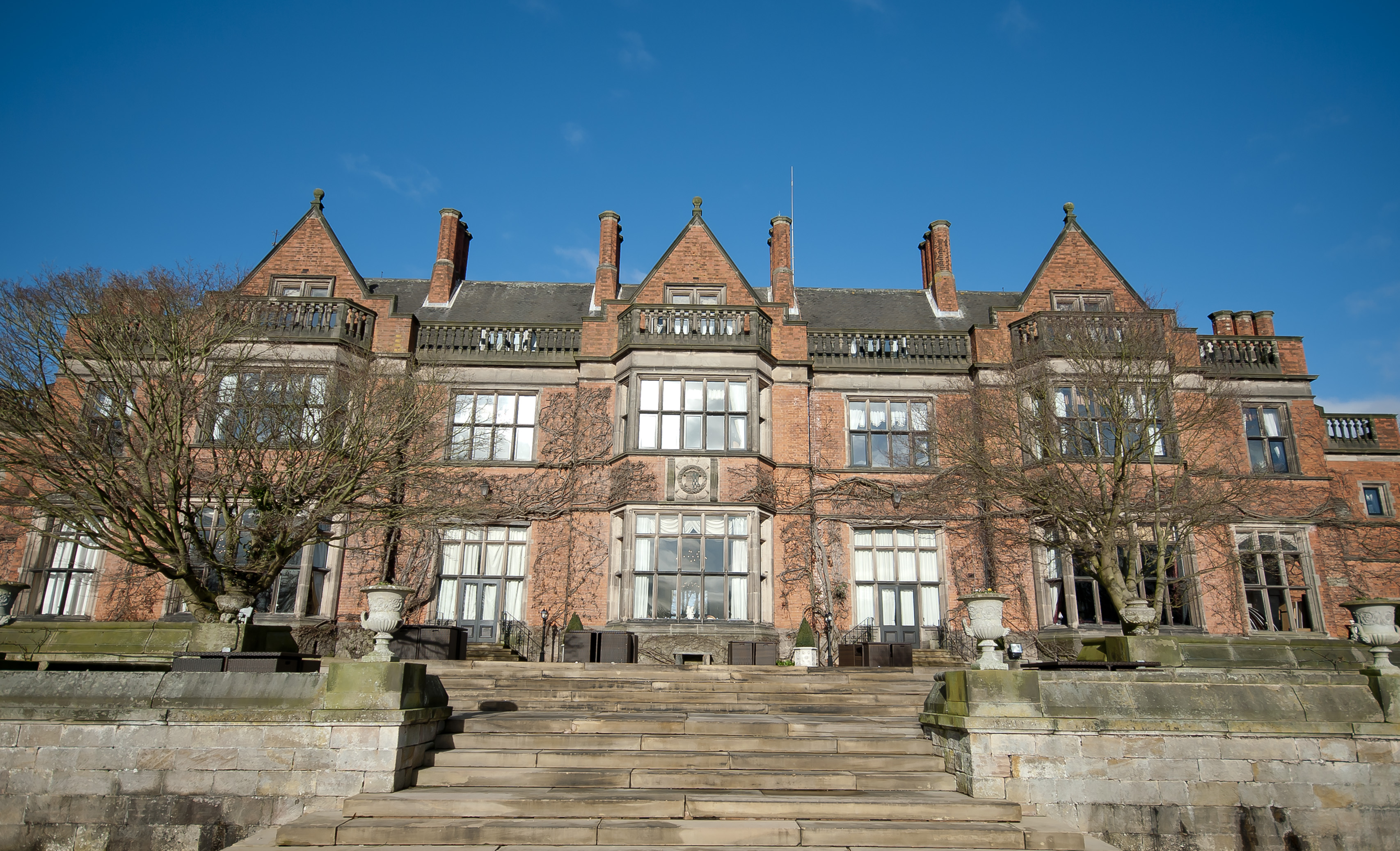
- Interactive map of the Hoar Cross Hall area

General information
- Type: Hotel & day spa
- Architectural style: Jacobean
- Location: Maker Lane, Hoar Cross, DE13 8QS, England
- Construction started: 1862
- Completed: 1871
- Renovated: 1993 (Extension)
- Owner: Meynell family (1862–1970); William Bickerton-Jones (1970-1989); Stephen Joynes (1989 to 2014); Barons Eden (2014 to present)

Technical details
- Material: Red brick
- Floor count: 2(OG) 1(UG)

Design and construction
- Architect: Henry Clutton

Other information
- Number of rooms: 106 bedrooms

Website
- www.hoarcross.co.uk

Listed Building – Grade II
- Designated: 26 April 1984
- Reference no.: 1038508

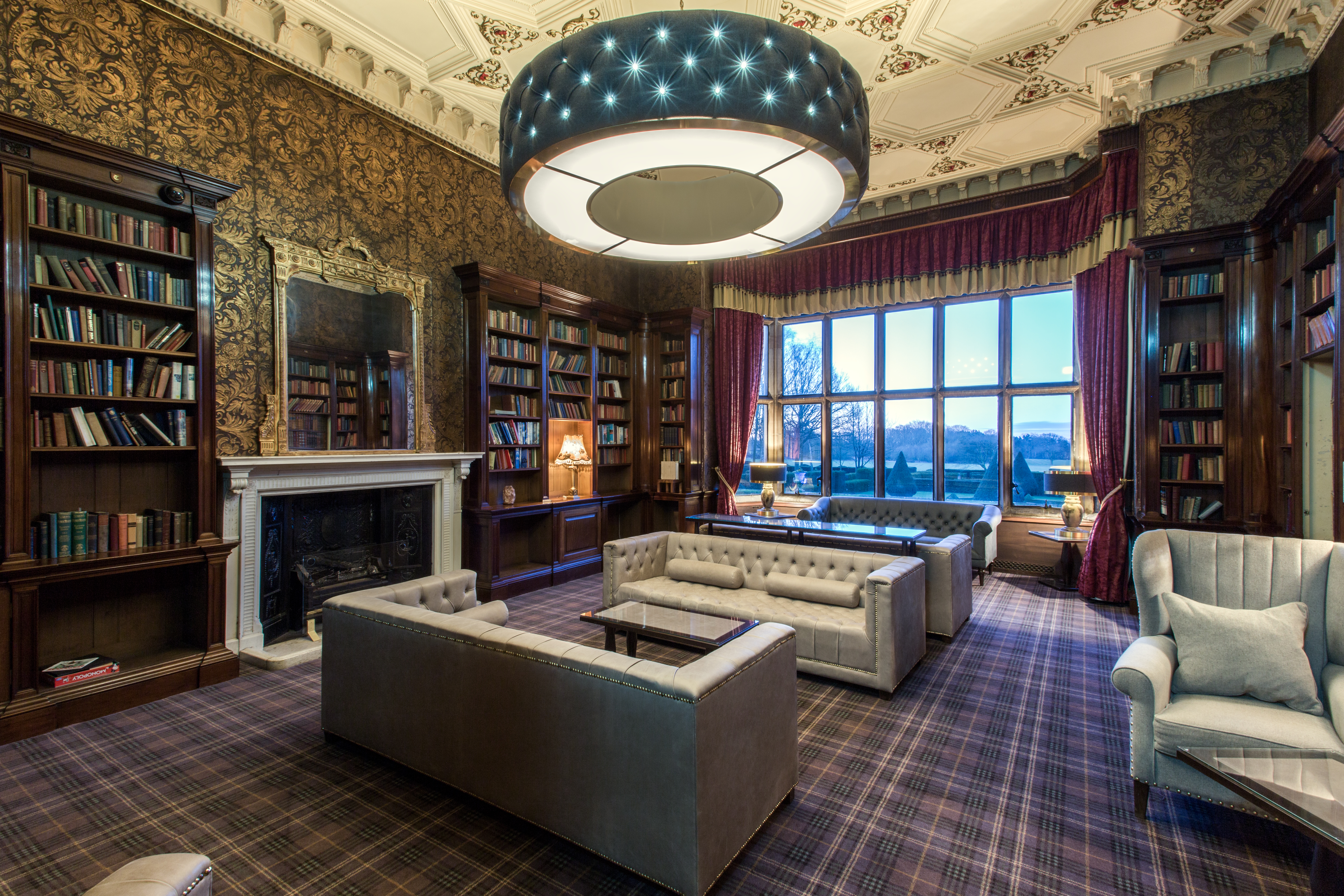
Library at Hoar Cross Hall

Hoar Cross Hall is a 19th-century country mansion near the villages of Hoar Cross and Hamstall Ridware, Staffordshire. England. The Grade II listed building is operated as a hotel and spa, and has facilities for conferences and weddings.

== History ==
The original Hoar Cross Estate comprised 490 acres and was bought for 18 pence in 1450 during Henry VI's reign, including a moat and a drawbridge, common in Tudor estate houses. It is reported that onlookers would simply turn up, just to set eyes on the building. It survived for nearly 300 years before being demolished in 1740.

From the early 17th century, Hoar Cross had been the first seat of the Ingram family whose principal residence was Temple Newsam, Leeds, West Riding of Yorkshire. In 1661, Henry Ingram was ennobled as Baron Ingram and Viscount of Irvine. On the death of the 9th Viscount in 1778, the Viscountcy became extinct. The estates descended to his daughters and in 1841 to Hugo Charles Meynell (grandson of Hugo Meynell and son of Sir Hugo Meynell who had married Elizabeth Ingram in 1782). Upon inheritance, Meynell incorporated "Ingram" into his surname to become Meynell Ingram.

In 1793, Hugo Meynell built what was to be called the 'Old Hall', a manor house for use as an occasional hunting lodge in Needwood Forest. When he died in 1808, Hugo's eldest son, Hugo Francis Meynell Ingram inherited the estate.

== House ==
Little changed at Hoar Cross until 1863, when Meynell Ingram set about a plan for a new hall to celebrate his marriage to Lady Charlotte Wood. She was the daughter of Charles Wood, 1st Viscount Halifax, who served as Chancellor of the Exchequer from 1846 to 1852. The Meynells were moving in "august circles" and Hugo appointed the architect Henry Clutton to oversee construction of a building to match their status.

The brief was to design an Elizabethan style house, with Jacobean overtones. Its gables, cupolas, 48 chimneys and mullioned windows are examples of the period style. Two large weathervanes were designed, overlooking the hall's turrets, in the shape of the letters M and I for Meynell Ingram. The 114 ft Long Gallery runs along the north side of the house, and was typical in Tudor homes, as a place where the family, particularly during bad weather, could walk, play music, or sit and talk.

The private chapel at the east end of the Long Gallery was built in memory of Meynell's son, by his widow, Charlotte Wood. It was designed by George Bodley and completed in 1897 at a cost of almost £1,000.

Meynell Ingram died in 1871 and Lady Charlotte built the Church of the Holy Angels in his memory. She remained in occupation of the hall until her death in 1904 when her nephew Frederick George Lindley Wood (later Meynell) inherited the estate.

== Later owners ==
In 1952 or 1954 the Meynell family moved to a smaller house in the neighbouring village of Newborough, leaving only a caretaker and his family.

In 1970, the building was purchased by William Bickerton-Jones and his wife Gwyneth and it became their family home along with their three children. At the time, Bickerton-Jones owned the largest private collection of mediaeval armour in the country, and during the 1970s the hall was open to the public with the collection displayed throughout the house. In 1974, the family started to run medieval banquets, which became a success and continued almost weekly until the family sold the hall. In 1989, businessman Steve Joynes MBE bought the hall and refurbished it, creating a new health spa, and in 2012, his son took over the day-to-day running of the hall.

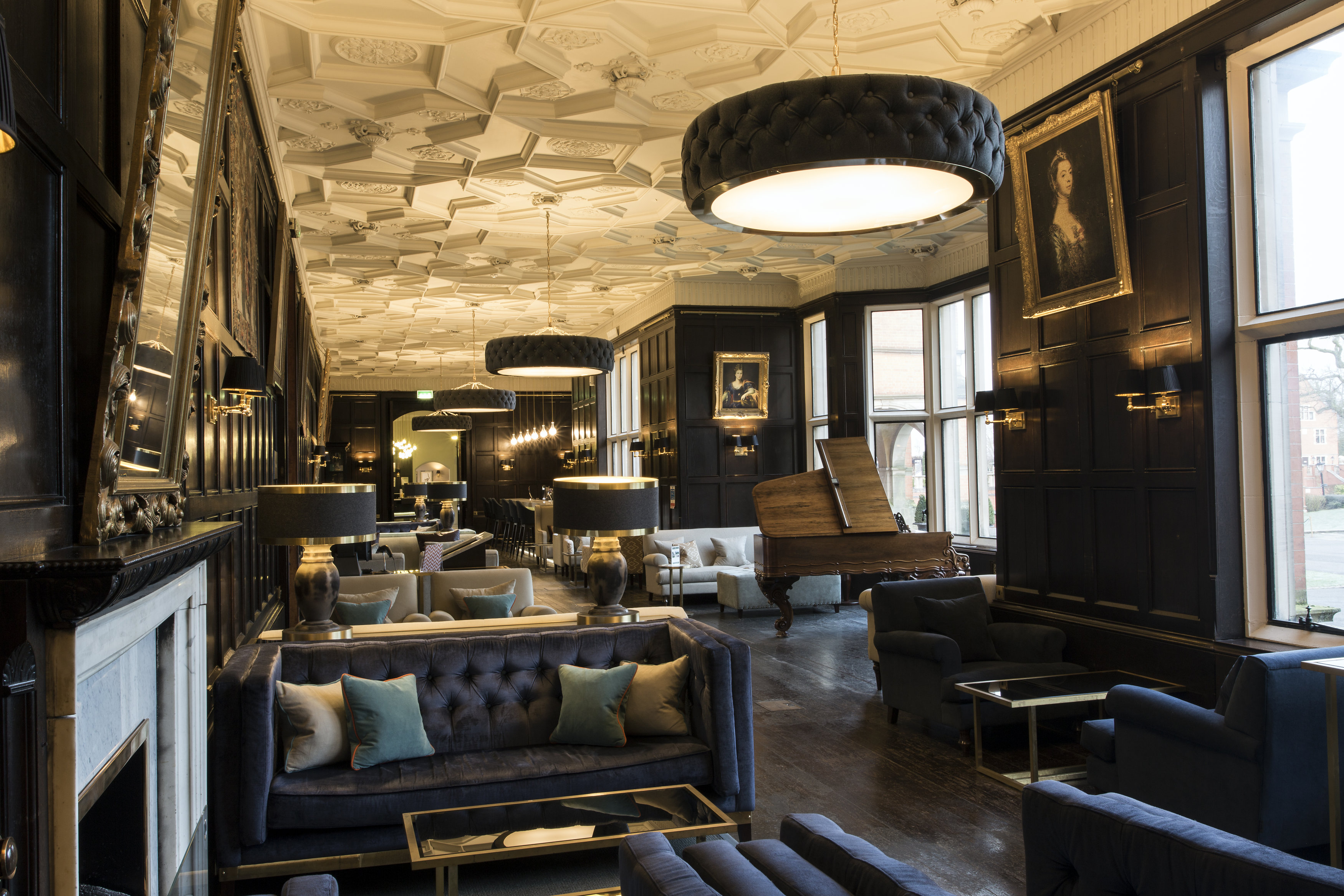
Long Gallery
