= Sir Smith Child, 1st Baronet =

British politician (1808–1896)

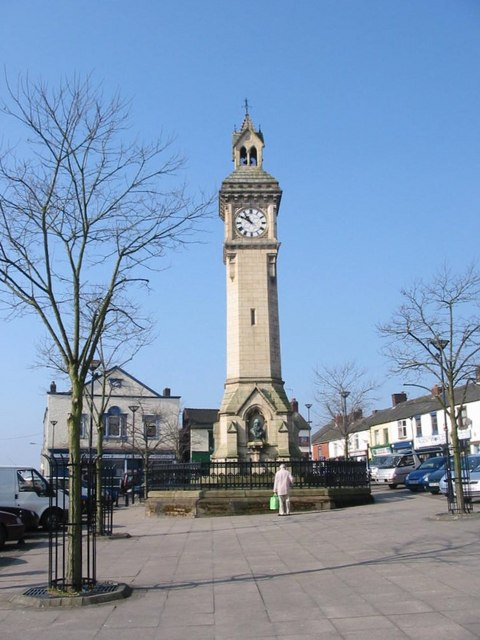
Tunstall Clock Tower

Sir Smith Child, 1st Baronet (5 March 1808 – 27 March 1896) was a Conservative Party politician in the United Kingdom.

He was born at Newfield Hall, Tunstall, Staffordshire the son of John George Child and the grandson of Admiral Smith Child (1730–1813). In 1835 he married Sarah, daughter and heiress of Richard Clarke Hill of Stallington Hall, Stone, Staffordshire. They had issue, beside one daughter, two sons:

Smith Hill Child, born 25 August 1837, died 20 January 1867. He married Isabella Eleanor, daughter of Major Colin Campbell, of Jura, but left only one daughter.
John George Child, born 25 August 1847, died in 1895. He married in 1877 Helen, daughter of the Reverend George Mather, of Huntley Hall, Staffordshire, and had issue two daughters, and two sons:

Smith Hill Child, who succeeded his own grandfather as 2nd Baronet.
Roylance George Child, born 7 January 1882, died unmarried 12 September 1901.

He was member of parliament (MP) for Staffordshire North from 1851 to 1859, and for Staffordshire West from 1868 to 1874. He was appointed High Sheriff of Staffordshire for 1865.

He was made a baronet on 7 December 1868, of Newfield and of Stallington in the county of Staffordshire, and of Dunlosset, Islay, the county of Argyll.

Tunstall clock tower was erected in his honour in 1893. Following his death in 1896, aged eighty-eight, his title passed to his eldest grandson Smith Hill Child.

== Sources ==
- Craig, F. W. S. (1983) [1969]. British parliamentary election results 1918–1949 (3rd ed.). Chichester: Parliamentary Research Services. ISBN 0-900178-06-X.
- Leigh Rayment's Historical List of MPs – Constituencies beginning with "S" (part 4)
- Leigh Rayment's list of baronets – Baronetcies beginning with "C" (part 2)

Parliament of the United Kingdom
Preceded by George Egerton; Charles Adderley	Member of Parliament for Staffordshire North; 1851–1859; With: Charles Adderley	Succeeded by The Viscount Ingestre; Charles Adderley
New constituency	Member of Parliament for Staffordshire West; 1868–1874; With: Hugo Meynell-Ingram, to 1871; Francis Monckton, from 1871	Succeeded by Alexander Hill; Francis Monckton
Baronetage of the United Kingdom
New creation	Baronet (of Newfield); 1868–1896	Succeeded by Smith Hill Child
