= Francis Monckton =

English politician

Francis Monckton (7 March 1844 – 30 September 1926) was an English Conservative politician who sat in the House of Commons from 1871 to 1885.

Monckton was the eldest son of Gen. Henry Monckton of Stretton Hall, Staffordshire and his wife Ann Smythe. He was educated at Eton and Christ Church, Oxford. He inherited the estates of Stretton and Somerford Hall from his uncle, George Monckton.

He joined the Staffordshire Yeomanry as a cornet, was appointed lieutenant in the Wolverhampton Troop on 5 February 1866, and promoted to captain on 21 February 1880. He was also a justice of the peace and deputy lieutenant for Staffordshire.

At a by-election in 1871 he was returned unopposed as Member of Parliament (MP) for West Staffordshire on the death of the previous incumbent, holding the seat until 1885. He was High Sheriff of Staffordshire for 1895–96.

Monckton married Evelyn Mary Heber-Percy, daughter of Algernon Charles Heber-Percy and Emily Heber, on 16 July 1889.

Parliament of the United Kingdom
Preceded by Sir Smith Child; Hugo Meynell-Ingram	Member of Parliament for West Staffordshire; 1871–1885; With: Sir Smith Child	Succeeded by Hamar Bass
