= Hugo Meynell-Ingram =

British politician (1822–1871)

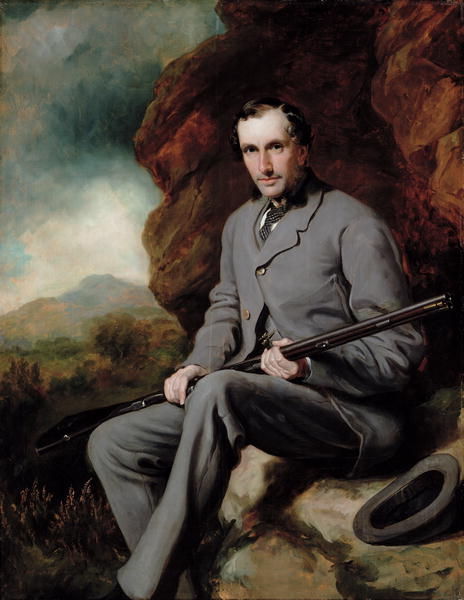
Portrait by Francis Grant, 1865

Hugo Francis Meynell-Ingram (25 June 1820 – 26 May 1871) was a British politician who was a member of the Conservative Party. He was member of parliament (MP) for West Staffordshire from 1868 to 1871.

== Life ==
Meynell-Ingram was the son of Hugo Meynell and his wife Georgina Pigou. His father, proprietor of Hoar Cross Hall and Temple Newsam changed his name to Meynell-Ingram. His mother was a lady of brilliance and charm who was friendly with such men as Sydney Smith, Lord Brougham, Walter Savage Landor and Charles Young.

He was elected Member of Parliament for Staffordshire West in 1868 and inherited Temple Newsam and Hoar Cross from his father in 1869.

He married Emily Charlotte Wood, daughter of Charles Wood, 1st Viscount Halifax, and of Mary daughter of Charles Grey, 2nd Earl Grey. After his death, Emily built the church of the Holy Angels at Hoar Cross as a memorial to him. The church was designed by George Frederick Bodley and Thomas Garner. Mrs. Meynell Ingram was a Lady of Grace of the Order of the Hospital of Saint John of Jerusalem in England, and on 8 May 1902 was promoted to a Lady of Justice (DStJ) in the same order. She died in 1904.

Parliament of the United Kingdom
New constituency	Member of Parliament for West Staffordshire; 1868–1871; With: Sir Smith Child	Succeeded by Sir Smith Child; Francis Monckton
