= Church of the Holy Angels, Hoar Cross =

Church in Staffordshire, England

Coordinates: 52°48′17″N 1°48′58″W

The Church of the Holy Angels, Hoar Cross
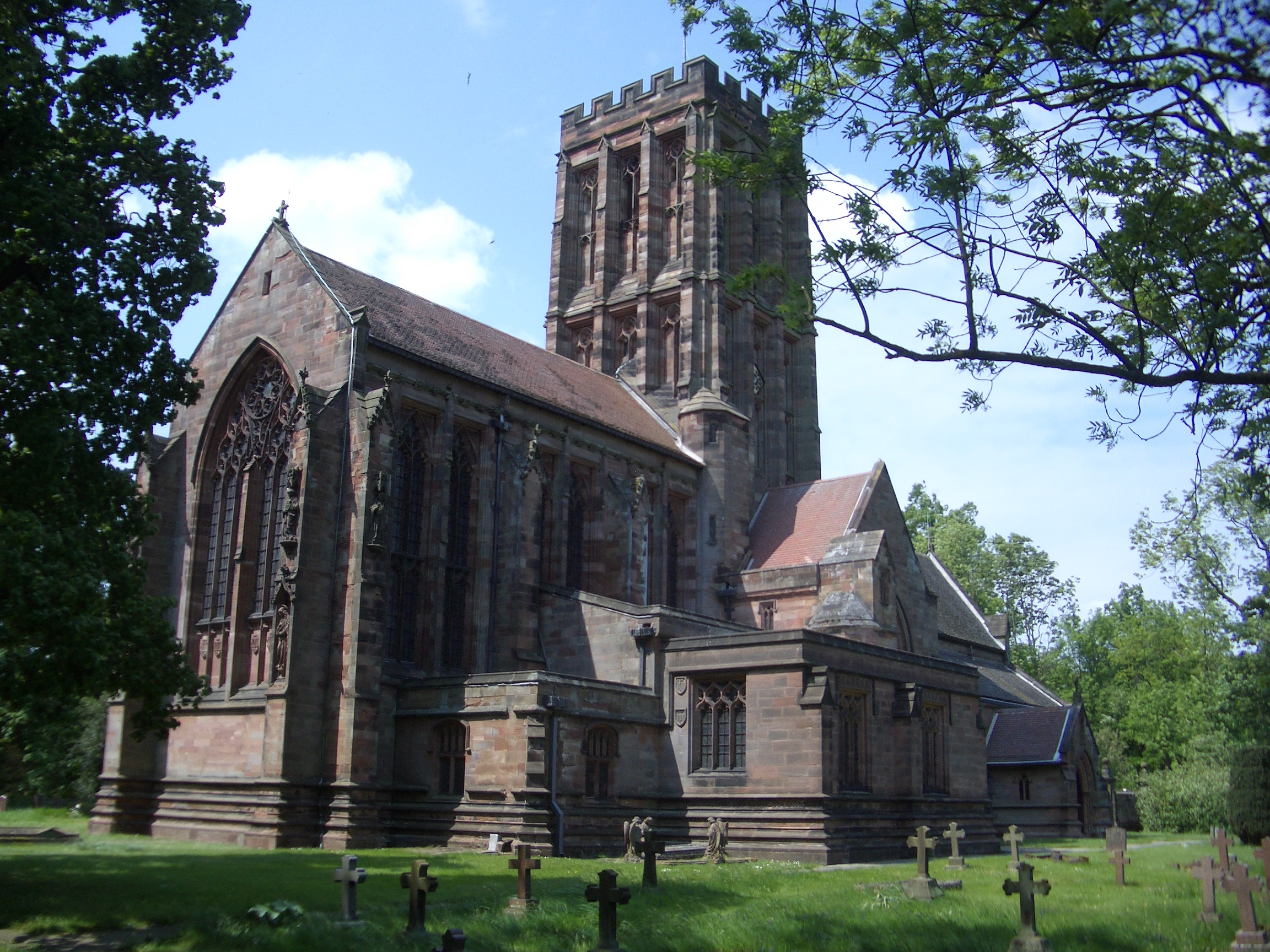
- Holy Angels' Church

- Location within Staffordshire
- OS grid reference: SK 12487 23046
- Location: Hoar Cross
- Country: England
- Denomination: Church of England
- Churchmanship: Anglo Catholic
- Website: www.holyangelshx.co.uk

History
- Dedication: Holy Angels
- Consecrated: 22 April 1876

Architecture
- Heritage designation: Grade I listed
- Architect(s): George Frederick Bodley and Thomas Garner
- Groundbreaking: 1872
- Completed: 1876

Administration
- Province: Cantebury
- Diocese: Diocese of Lichfield
- Archdeaconry: Stoke on Trent
- Deanery: Tutbury
- Parish: Hoar Cross with Newchurch

Clergy
- Bishop: Rt Revd Paul Thomas SSC (AEO)
- Vicar: Canon Paul Greenwell SSC

The Church of the Holy Angels is an Anglican church in Hoar Cross, Staffordshire, England. It is a Grade I listed building.

== History ==
It was built by the pious Anglo-Catholic, Emily Charlotte Meynell Ingram (sister of Charles Wood, 2nd Viscount Halifax) in memory of Hugo Francis Meynell Ingram who died in May 1871. The architects were George Frederick Bodley and Thomas Garner. Work started in 1872 and the church dedication took place on 22 April 1876. Further extension and additions took place until the church achieved its present form in 1906.

John Betjeman described the church as "the masterpiece of its late Victorian architect G.F. Bodley" and "great architecture; original, well massed, well sited, well detailed; very English".

=== Present day ===
From 2008, the Church received alternative episcopal oversight from the Bishop of Ebbsfleet, as the parish does not accept the ordination of women to the priesthood or episcopate. This oversight was transferred in 2023 to the Bishop of Oswestry.

== Organ ==
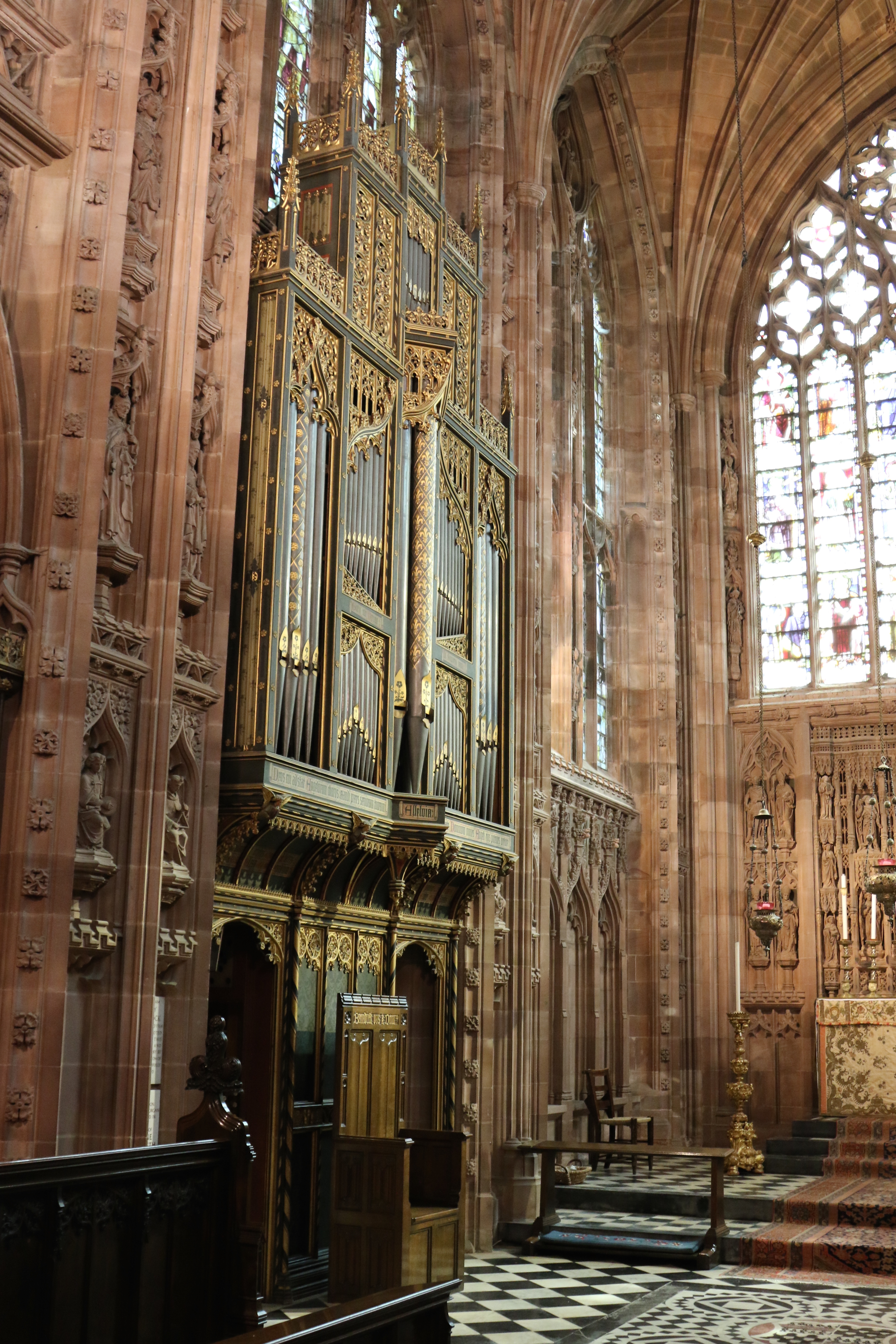
The organ case

The organ was originally built by Samuel Green in 1779 for Bangor Cathedral. It was installed in Hoar Cross by Bishop and Son in 1876 and enlarged by Conacher in 1935. As a result of a very generous donation, it underwent extensive repair and finished at the end of 2012. An electronic organ was used temporarily for services. The specification of the pipe organ can be found on the National Pipe Organ Register at.

== Timeline ==
- 1872 Construction started
- 1876 Services start in April
- 1891 North side Lady Chapel added
- 1900 South side All Souls Chapel added
- 1906 Narthex added
- 1935 Bells rehung and organ enlarged

== Gallery ==
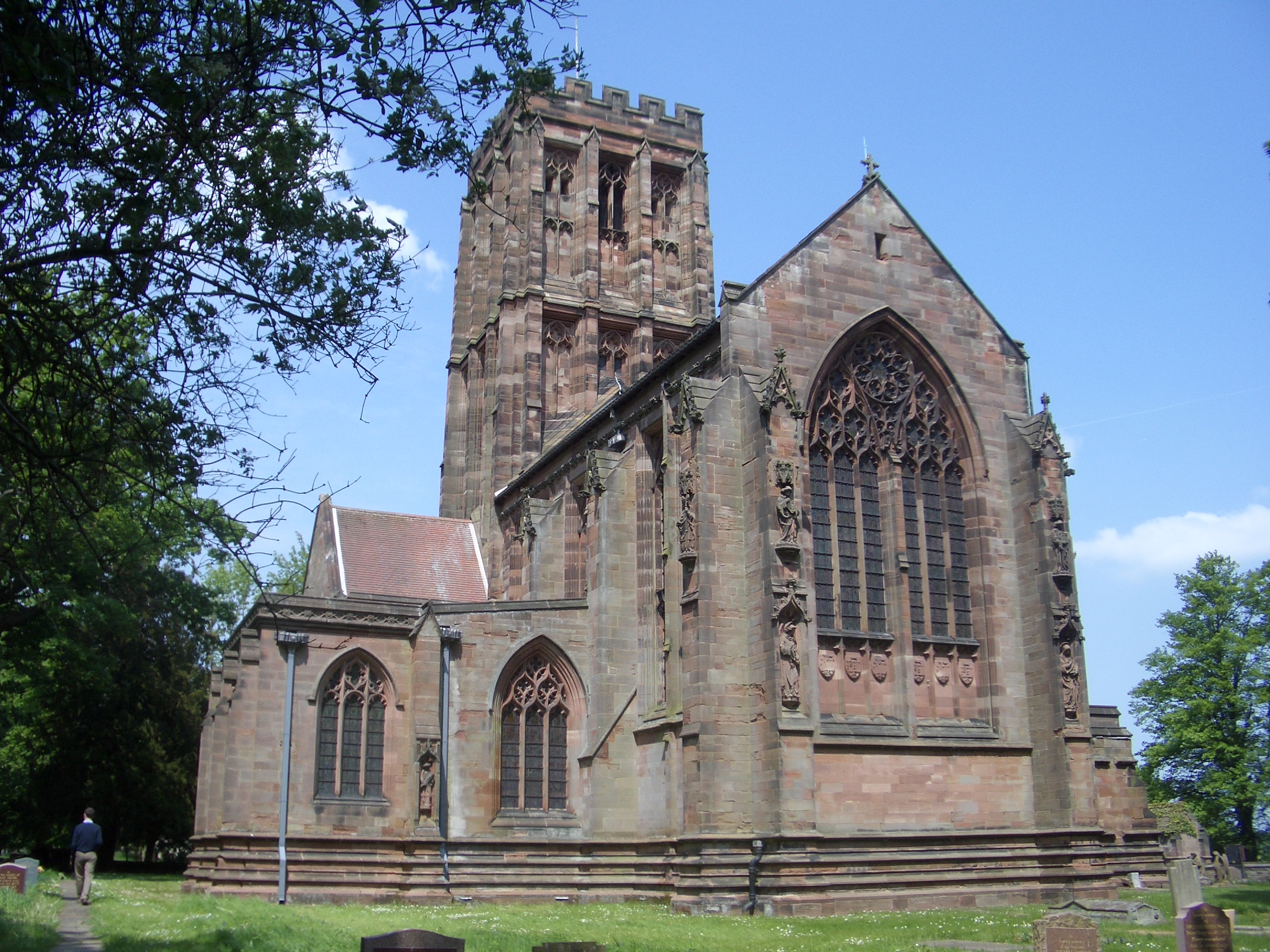
The liturgical east end of the Church. The Chantry Chapel and the All Souls Chapel are to the left of the picture

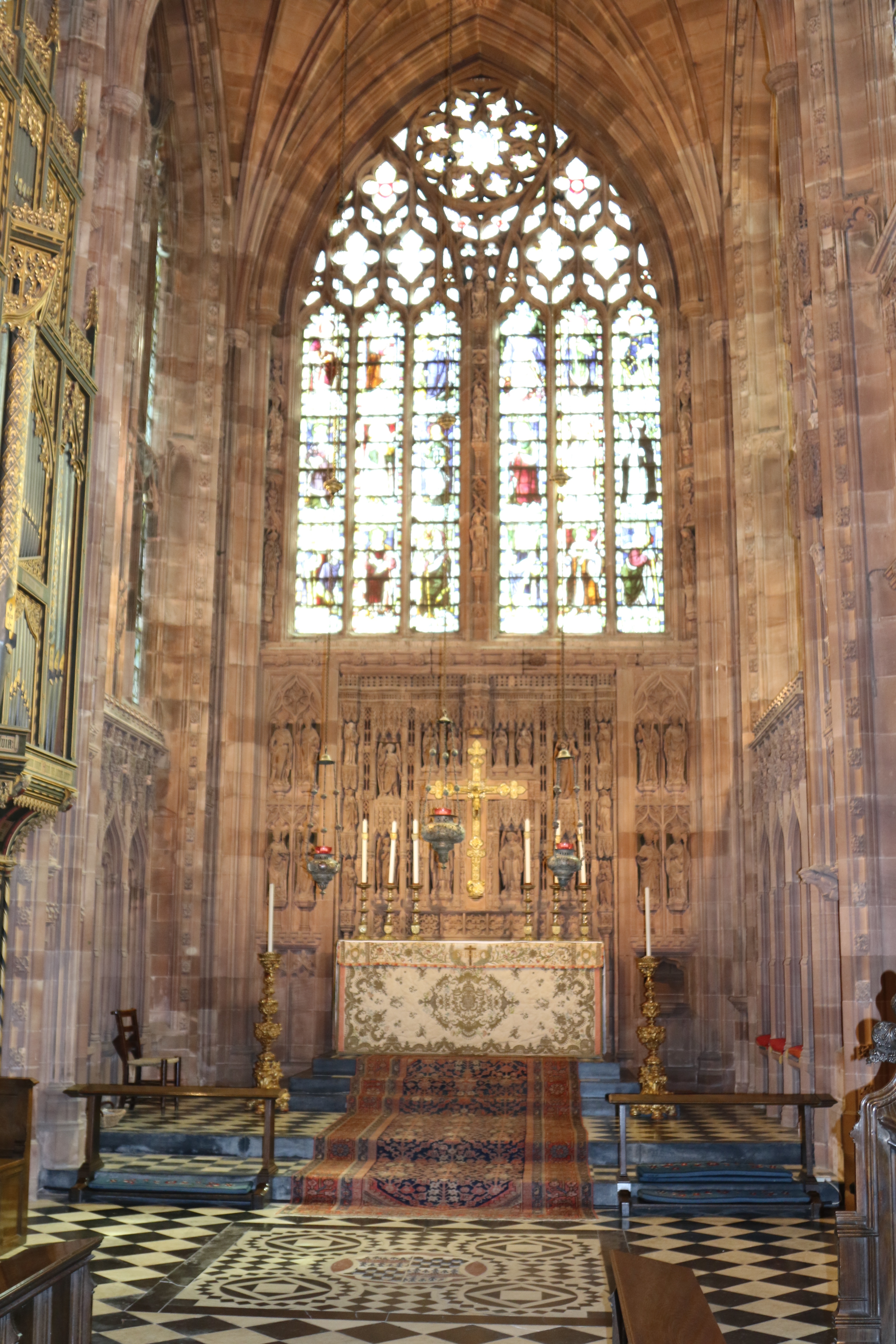
The sanctuary and high altar

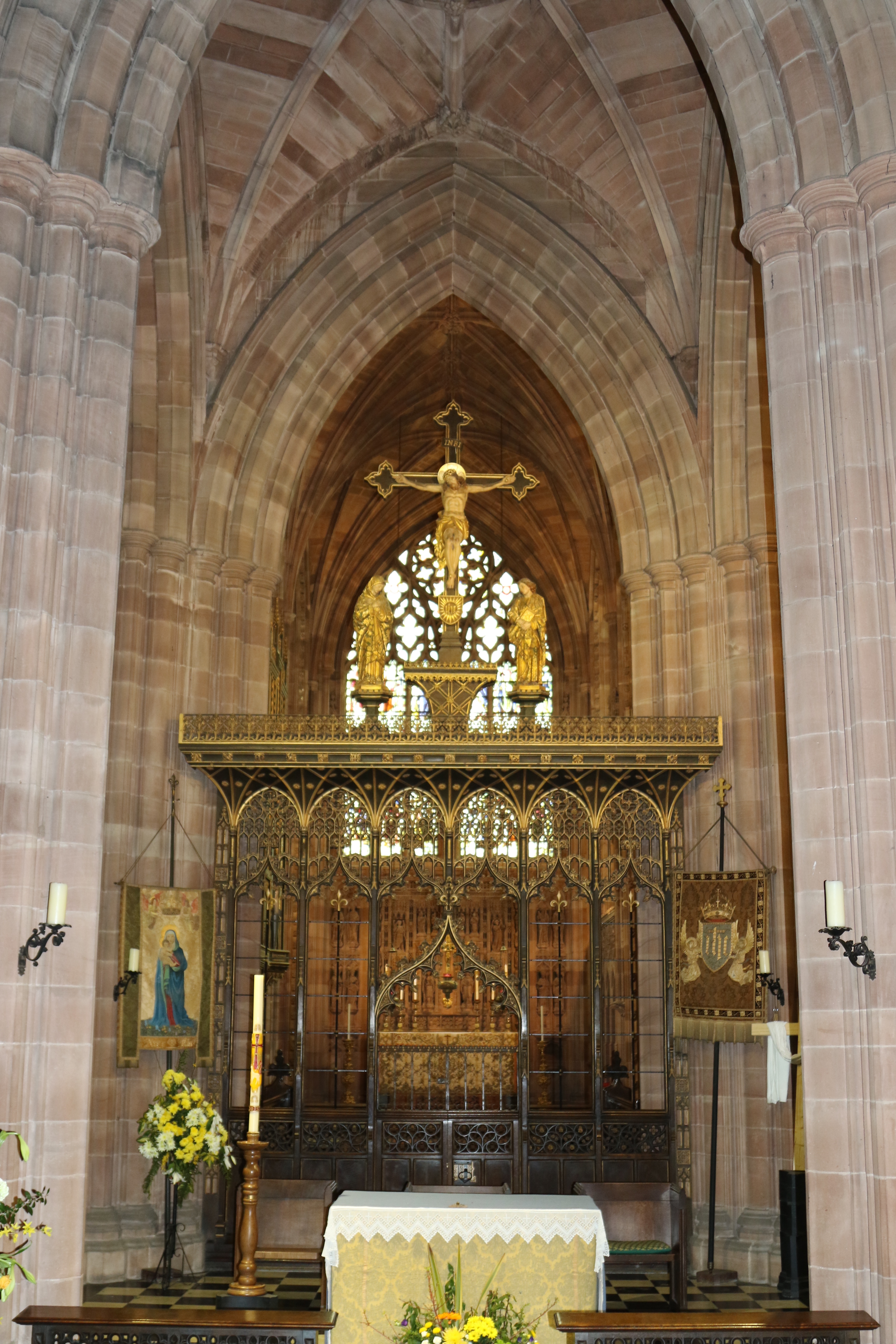
The tower crossing and rood screen

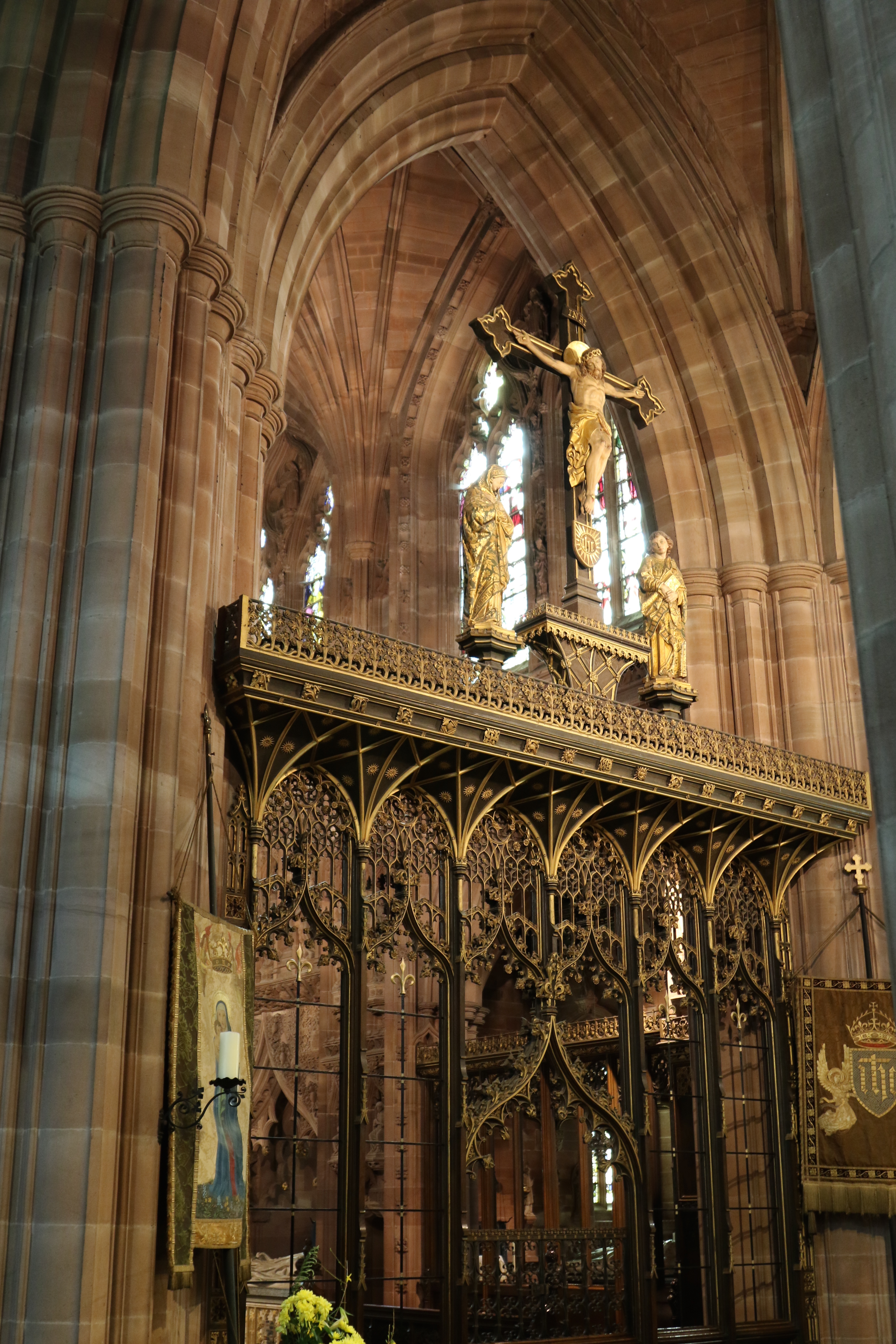
The rood screen

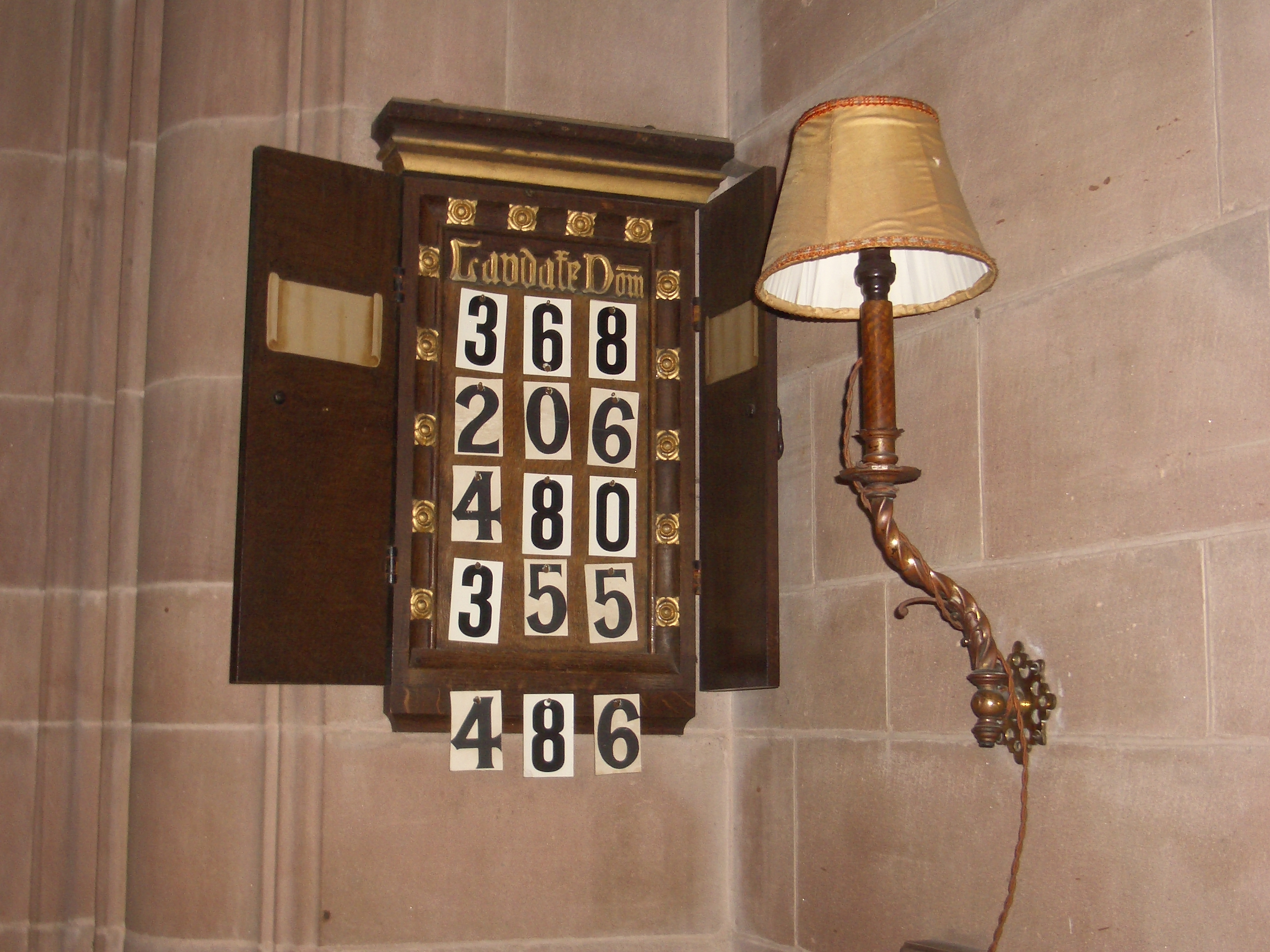
The hymnboard

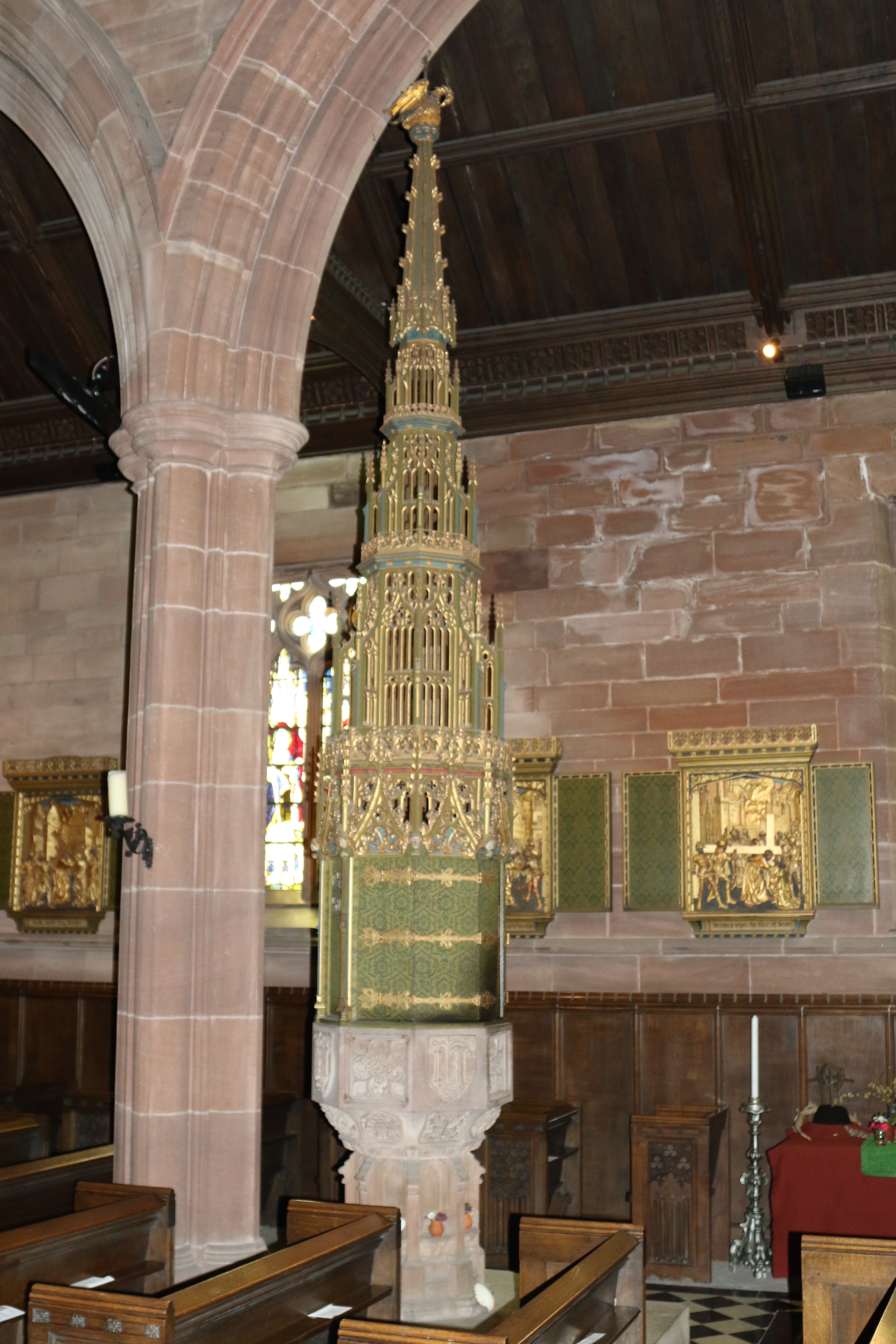
The font

== See also ==
- List of Grade I listed buildings in Staffordshire
- Grade I listed churches in Staffordshire
